= 2023 Virginia's 4th congressional district special election =

- February 21, 2023

Virginia's 4th congressional district
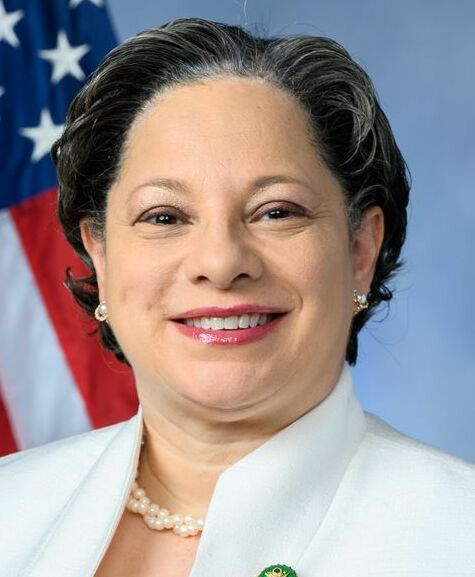

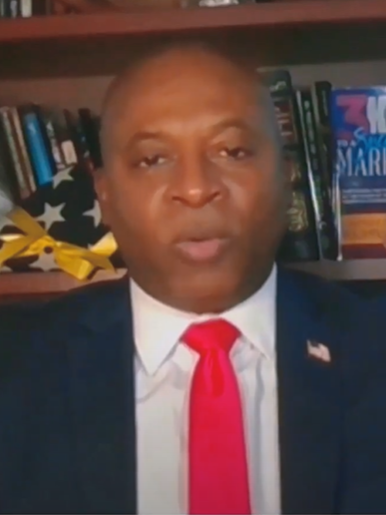
Nominee	Jennifer McClellan	Leon Benjamin
Party	Democratic	Republican
Popular vote	82,040	28,083
Percentage	74.41%	25.47%
- McClellan: 50–60% 60–70% 70–80% 80–90% >90% Benjamin: 50–60% 60–70% 70–80% 80–90% Tie: 40–50% No votes
U.S. Representative before election
Donald McEachin
Democratic
Elected U.S. Representative
Jennifer McClellan
Democratic

The 2023 Virginia's 4th congressional district special election was a special election to the U.S. House of Representatives that was held to fill Virginia's 4th congressional district for the remainder of the 118th United States Congress. The seat became vacant after incumbent Democrat Donald McEachin died on November 28, 2022, of colorectal cancer. State Senator Jennifer McClellan was declared the victor shortly after the polls closed, winning in a landslide against her Republican opponent.

In the United States, vacancies in the House must be filled by special elections. Under Virginia law, the governor schedules the special election and political parties handle their nominating processes themselves. On December 12, 2022, Governor Glenn Youngkin announced that the special election would take place on February 21, 2023. According to the writ of election, party nominees and other prospective candidates had until December 23 to file to run in the special election.

== Democratic primary ==
The Fourth Congressional District Democratic Committee, responsible for choosing a nominee by December 23, organized an unassembled caucus, or "firehouse primary," on December 20 with a filing deadline of December 16. According to the Democratic Party of Virginia, the race saw the highest turnout in a "firehouse primary" in Virginia history.

The solid Democratic lean of the district meant that victory in the primary was seen as tantamount to election. Political analysts perceived the short timeline between the writ of election and the primary date as beneficial to candidates with institutional support. The major candidates in the primary were state senators Jennifer McClellan, who was considered to be the establishment favorite, and "firebrand" Joe Morrissey. Morrissey criticized the lack of polling locations in his Senate district and his campaign paid for a radio ad encouraging Republicans to vote for him.

McClellan won with 85% of the vote to Morrissey's 14%.

=== Candidates ===
==== Nominee ====
- Jennifer McClellan, state senator from the 9th district (2017–present) and candidate for governor of Virginia in 2021

==== Eliminated in primary ====
- Tavorise Marks, insurance business owner and candidate for Virginia's 62nd House of Delegates district in 2019
- Joe Morrissey, state senator from the 16th district (2020–present) and candidate for mayor of Richmond in 2016
- Joseph Preston, former state delegate from the 63rd district (2015–2016)

==== Withdrawn ====
- Lamont Bagby, state delegate from the 74th district (2015–present) and chair of the Virginia Legislative Black Caucus (endorsed McClellan)

==== Declined ====
- Lashrecse Aird, former state delegate from the 63rd district (2016–2022)
- Colette McEachin, Richmond Commonwealth's Attorney and widow of Donald McEachin (endorsed McClellan)
- Levar Stoney, mayor of Richmond (2017–present) and former Virginia Secretary of the Commonwealth (2014–2016) (endorsed McClellan)
- Treska Wilson-Smith, Petersburg city councilor

=== Endorsements ===
Lamont Bagby (withdrawn)

State legislators

- ~~Delores McQuinn, state delegate from the 70th district (2009–present)~~ (switched endorsement to McClellan after Bagby withdrew)
- Luke Torian, state delegate from the 52nd district (2010–present)

Local officials

- ~~Levar Stoney, mayor of Richmond (2017–present) and former Virginia Secretary of the Commonwealth (2014–2016)~~ (switched endorsement to McClellan after Bagby withdrew)
Jennifer McClellan

U.S. senators

- Tim Kaine, U.S. senator from Virginia (2013–present), former governor of Virginia (2006–2010), and former mayor of Richmond (1998–2001)
- Mark Warner, U.S. senator from Virginia (2009–present) and former governor of Virginia (2002–2006)

U.S. representatives

- Don Beyer, U.S. representative from Virginia's 8th congressional district (2015–present) and former lieutenant governor of Virginia (1990–1998)
- Gerry Connolly, U.S. representative from Virginia's 11th congressional district (2009–present)
- Maxwell Frost, U.S. representative from Florida's 10th congressional district (2023–present)
- Elaine Luria, U.S. representative from Virginia's 2nd congressional district (2019–2023)
- Nancy Pelosi, U.S. representative from California's 11th congressional district (1987–present) and Speaker of the House (2007–2011, 2019–2023)
- Abigail Spanberger, U.S. representative from Virginia's 7th congressional district (2019–present)
- Jennifer Wexton, U.S. representative from Virginia's 10th congressional district (2019–present)

State officials

- Viola Baskerville, former Virginia Secretary of Administration (2006–2010) and former state delegate from the 71st district (1998–2005)

State legislators

- Dawn Adams, state delegate from the 68th district (2018–present)
- Lamont Bagby, state delegate from the 74th district (2015–present), chair of the Virginia Legislative Black Caucus and withdrawn candidate in this election
- Mamie Locke, state senator from the 2nd district (2004–present) and former mayor of Hampton (2000–2004)
- Louise Lucas, president pro tempore of the Senate of Virginia (2020–present) from the 18th district (1992–present)
- Delores McQuinn, state delegate from the 70th district (2009–present)
- Rodney Willett, state delegate from the 70th district (2020–present)

Local officials

- Colette McEachin, Richmond Commonwealth's Attorney and widow of Donald McEachin
- Levar Stoney, mayor of Richmond (2017–present) and former Virginia Secretary of the Commonwealth (2014–2016)

Organizations

- Congressional Progressive Caucus
- Democratic Majority for Israel
- EMILY's List
- Human Rights Campaign
- League of Conservation Voters
- NARAL
- New Democrat Coalition

=== Results ===
Democratic firehouse primary results
Party	Candidate	Votes	%
Democratic	Jennifer McClellan	23,661	84.8
Democratic	Joe Morrissey	3,782	13.6
Democratic	Tavorise Marks	217	0.8
Democratic	Joseph Preston	174	0.6
	Unallocated	66	0.2
Total votes		27,900	100.0

== Republican primary ==
The Fourth Congressional District Republican Committee, responsible for choosing a nominee by December 23, held a canvass event in Colonial Heights on December 17.

=== Candidates ===
==== Nominee ====
- Leon Benjamin, pastor, U.S. Navy veteran, and nominee for this seat in 2020 and 2022

==== Eliminated in primary ====
- Derrick Hollie, marketing executive
- Dale Sturdifen, former chair of the Mecklenburg County Public Schools Board and candidate for Virginia's 15th Senate district in 2019

== General election ==
=== Analysis ===
Despite already being regarded as a safe seat, McClellan still managed to widen the margin from the previous election in the district, winning with the largest percentage of votes in any federal election in the state since 2020 and the largest of any special election since 1946. Being a special election in an off year that comes with turnout downturn, McClellan won about three quarters of the total vote, while Benjamin slid to just a quarter of the vote, losing for the third time in a row. McClellan swept every county in the district except for Colonial Heights City and Prince George County.

After winning the special election, McClellan was sworn in on March 7, 2023, becoming the first black congresswoman from the Commonwealth of Virginia.

=== Predictions ===
Source	Ranking	As of
The Cook Political Report	Solid D	December 22, 2022
Inside Elections	Solid D	December 22, 2022
Sabato's Crystal Ball	Safe D	December 20, 2022

=== Results ===
2023 Virginia's 4th congressional district special election
Party	Candidate	Votes	%	±%
Democratic	Jennifer McClellan	82,040	74.41%	+9.49
Republican	Leon Benjamin	28,083	25.47%	−9.43
Write-in		129	0.12%	−0.05
Total votes		110,252	100.00%	N/A
Democratic hold				

==== By county and independent city ====
By county and independent city

Locality	Jennifer McClellan Democratic		Leon Benjamin Republican		Write-in Various		Margin		Total votes
Locality	#	%	#	%	#	%	#	%	Total votes
Brunswick	1,631	65.14%	872	34.82%	1	0.04%	759	30.31%	2,504
Charles City	1,113	72.32%	426	27.68%	0	0.00%	687	44.64%	1,539
Chesterfield (part)	17,494	65.50%	9,174	34.35%	39	0.15%	8,320	31.15%	26,707
Colonial Heights	790	32.38%	1,645	67.42%	5	0.20%	−855	−35.04%	2,440
Dinwiddie	2,000	52.87%	1,781	47.08%	2	0.05%	219	5.79%	3,783
Emporia	513	65.60%	269	34.40%	0	0.00%	244	31.20%	782
Greensville	1,010	55.13%	821	44.81%	1	0.05%	189	10.32%	1,832
Henrico (part)	18,658	81.24%	4,282	18.64%	26	0.11%	14,376	62.60%	22,966
Hopewell	1,313	62.08%	801	37.87%	1	0.05%	512	24.21%	2,115
Petersburg	3,687	91.53%	331	8.22%	10	0.25%	3,356	83.32%	4,028
Prince George	2,410	46.84%	2,726	52.98%	9	0.17%	−316	−6.14%	5,145
Richmond City	28,991	90.10%	3,152	9.80%	34	0.11%	25,839	80.30%	32,177
Southampton (part)	494	56.98%	373	43.02%	0	0.00%	121	13.96%	867
Surry	968	59.72%	653	40.28%	0	0.00%	315	19.43%	1,621
Sussex	968	55.44%	777	44.50%	1	0.06%	191	10.94%	1,746
Total	82,040	74.41%	28,083	25.47%	129	0.12%	53,957	48.94%	110,252

Counties that flipped from Republican to Democratic

- Dinwiddie (largest municipality: McKenney)
- Sussex (largest municipality: Jarratt)
- Southampton (largest municipality: Courtland)

== See also ==
- 2023 United States House of Representatives elections
- 2023 Virginia elections
- 118th United States Congress
- List of special elections to the United States House of Representatives
