= 2020 Richmond, Virginia, mayoral election =

- November 3, 2020
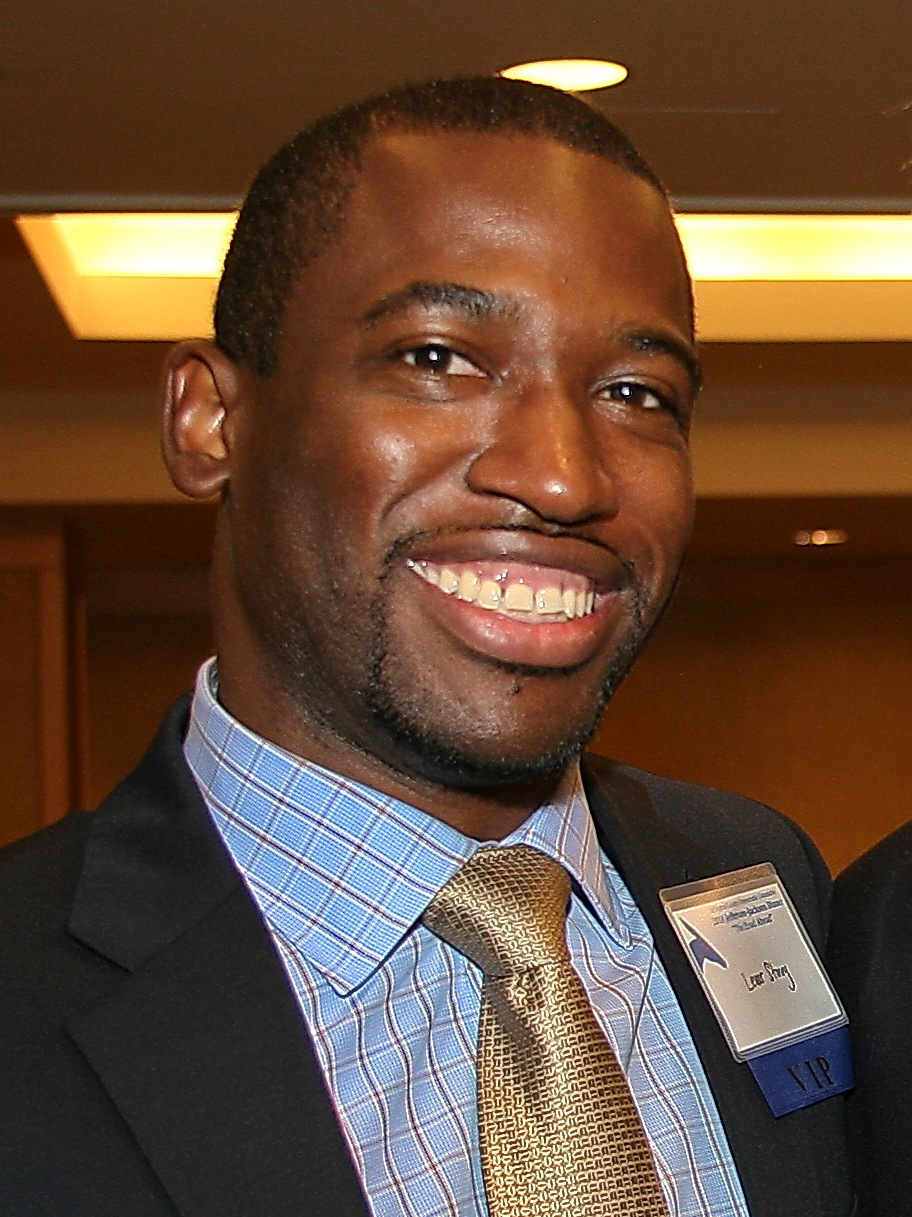

Nominee	Levar Stoney	Alexsis Rodgers
Party	Democratic	Democratic
Popular vote	41,145	28,885
Percentage	37.7%	26.5%
Nominee	Kim Gray	M. Justin Griffin
Party	Democratic	Republican
Popular vote	24,478	7,786
Percentage	26.1%	7.1%
- Precinct results Stoney: 30-40% 40-50% 50-60% 60-70% Rodgers: 30-40% 40-50% 50-60% Gray: 30-40% 40-50% 50-60% 60-70% Griffin: 30-40%
Mayor before election
Levar Stoney
Democratic
Elected mayor
Levar Stoney
Democratic

Richmond, Virginia, held a general election on November 3, 2020. Voters elected the mayor of Richmond, Virginia, members of the Richmond City Council, and several other local officials. The incumbent, Levar Stoney, who was elected in 2016, ran for reelection, facing five challengers. While local races in Virginia are officially nonpartisan elections, four candidates (Stoney, Gray, Rodgers, and McLean) identified with the Democratic party while Griffin ran as an independent. Stoney won the most votes in six out of nine city council districts, and therefore won reelection. In order to win election, a candidate must receive the most votes in five or more districts.

== Background ==
Incumbent Democrat Levar Stoney was eligible to seek re-election. The election was the fifth citywide election for mayor through popular vote. The election is nonpartisan, meaning no candidate can be affiliated with any party on the ticket.

Leading up to the election, the incumbent mayor, Stoney, had received criticism for his handling of the Navy Hill project, the COVID-19 pandemic, and the George Floyd protests.

In his reelection campaign, Stoney championed his accomplishments during the first four years in office, including a halt on evictions during the COVID-19 pandemic, free eyeglasses for students in Richmond Public Schools, and increased RPS funding. Stoney also noted his accomplishments in public transportation, such as the opening of the GRTC Pulse transit line, which opened during his second year as mayor.

Challenger Justin Griffin ran a campaign premised on the idea that the residents of Richmond deserved better than they got from the city government. His campaign used the slogan "We Deserve Better." His top-discussed issues were "better schools, better roads, [and] better city services."

== Candidates ==
=== Declared ===
- Kimberly Gray, 2nd District City Councilwoman
- Justin Griffin, small business attorney
- Tracey McLean, small business owner
- Alexsis Rodgers, National Domestic Workers Alliance state director and former policy director of Ralph Northam
- Levar Stoney, incumbent mayor

=== Withdrawn ===
- Michael Gilbert, economics professor at VCU (withdrew on September 15)

=== Endorsements ===
Alexsis Rodgers

Organizations

- Justice Democrats
- LGBTQ Victory Fund
- New Virginia Majority
- Our Revolution RVA
- Run for Something
- Sierra Club
- Sunrise Movement Richmond
- Victory Fund

City councilmen

- Andria McClellan, Norfolk City Council
- Selonia Miles, Dumfries Town Council

County supervisors

- Kenny Boddye, Prince William Board of County Supervisors
- Margaret Angela Franklin, Prince William Board of County Supervisors

State delegates

- Dawn Adams (68)
- Lashrecse Aird (63)
- Jennifer Carroll Foy (2)
- Lee J. Carter (50)
- Joshua G. Cole (28)
- Marcia Price (95)
- Sam Rasoul (11)
- Danica Roem (13)
- Ibraheem Samirah (86)

Individuals

- Yanet Amado, founder, UndocuRams
- Nathan Burrell, environmental justice advocate
- Milondra Coleman, Richmond Public Schools teacher
- Lacette Cross, pastor, Restoration Fellowship RVA
- Margaret Doyle, owner, Espresso-A-Go-Go
- JS Fauquet, community volunteer and advocate
- Emily Francis, environmental advocate
- Ali Greenberg, founder of the Broad
- Aurora Higgs, LGBTQ advocate
- Chelsea Higgs Wise, executive director, Marijuana Justice
- Josie Mace, human rights and community advocate
- Melissa Marrion, professor emerita of Music, VCU
- Paulette McElwain, CEO, Virginia League for Planned Parenthood
- Joseph Papa, community volunteer and advocate
- Amanda Pohl, 2019 candidate, SD-11
- Charlie Schmidt, civil rights attorney
- Genet Semere, pwner, C'est Le Vin
- Mary Jo Sheeley, 2017 candidate, HD-68
- Ruth Twiggs, community activist
- Harrison Wallace, environmental justice advocate
- Edwuan Whitehead, community organizer
- Jennifer Wicker, government relations professional and healthcare advocate
- Lee Williams, co-chair, Green New Deal VA
Levar Stoney

Governors

- Ralph Northam, governor of Virginia

State delegates

- Lamont Bagby (74)
Kim Gray

Organizations

- Richmond Crusade for Voters

Governors

- L. Douglas Wilder, former Governor of Virginia

Statewide officials

- Viola Baskerville, former Virginia Secretary of Administration, former State Delegate (71)

City councilmen

- Jon Baliles, former Richmond City Councilman and 2016 mayoral candidate

Local officials

- Jack Berry, former Richmond budget director, former Richmond deputy city manager, former Hanover County Administrator, and 2016 mayoral candidate
- C.T. Woody, Jr., former Richmond city sheriff

Individuals

- Meg Lawrence, former president of the Ginter Park Residents Association
- Jerome Legions, president of the Carver Area Civic Improvement League

== Polling ==
Poll source	Date	Sample size (Note: Key: A – all adults RV – registered voters LV – likely voters V – unclear)	Margin of error	Kim Gray (D)	Justin Griffin (I)	Tracey McLean (D)	Alexsis Rodgers (D)	Levar Stoney (D)	Undecided
Christopher Newport University/Richmond Times-Dispatch	September 22 – October 5, 2020	601 (LV)	± 4.3%	16%	3%	1%	15%	36%	30%
ARG/Anonymous Sponsor	September 23–27, 2020	540 (RV)	± 4.5%	33%	11%	3%	13%	37%	2%
ARG	July 16–21, 2020	540 (RV)	± 4.2%	31%	11%	–	16%	36%	–

== Results ==
Richmond mayoral election, 2020
Party	Candidate	Votes	%
Democratic	Levar Stoney (incumbent)	41,145	37.72
Democratic	Alexsis Rodgers	28,885	26.48
Democratic	Kimberly Gray	28,478	26.11
Republican	M. Justin Griffin	7,786	7.14
Independent	Michael Gilbert (withdrawn)	1,473	1.35
Democratic	Tracey McLean	1,099	1.01
Write-in		220	0.20
Total votes		109,086	100
Democratic hold			

== Notes ==
Partisan clients
