= Leonidas B. Young II =

American minister and politician (1954–2016)

74th Mayor of Richmond, Virginia
- In office July 1, 1994 – June 30, 1996
- Preceded by: Walter T. Kenney Sr.
- Succeeded by: Larry E. Chavis

Personal details
- Born: Leonidas Bernard Young II; November 9, 1954 Richmond, Virginia, U.S.
- Died: January 16, 2016 (aged 61) Richmond, Virginia, U.S.
- Party: Democratic
- Spouse: Sanya Buster
- Education: Virginia Union University; Drew University

Leonidas Bernard "Lee" Young II (November 9, 1954 – January 16, 2016) was an American Baptist minister who served on the Richmond, Virginia City Council from 1992 to 1999, when he was forced to resign for influence peddling. He served as the city's mayor from 1994 to 1996.

== Career ==
Young was the founder and pastor of New Kingdom Ministries in Richmond. He had previously served as minister of the city's Fourth Baptist Church, which he was convicted of defrauding in 1998. He died at the age of 61 in 2016.

== House of Delegates attempts ==
=== 1997 ===
Young entered the Democratic primary in 1997 to succeed Jean Wooden Cunningham as the delegate for Virginia's 71st House district. He lost the nomination to Viola Baskerville, who went on to win the general election by a significant margin.

=== 2015 ===
On March 16, 2015, Young announced his intention to make a political comeback and run for disgraced Delegate Joseph D. Morrissey's seat, representing the state's 74th district.

Political offices
Preceded by Walter T. Kenney Sr.	Mayor of Richmond; 1994–1996	Succeeded by Larry E. Chavis
