= 2016 Richmond, Virginia, mayoral election =

2016 mayoral election in Virginia

- November 8, 2016
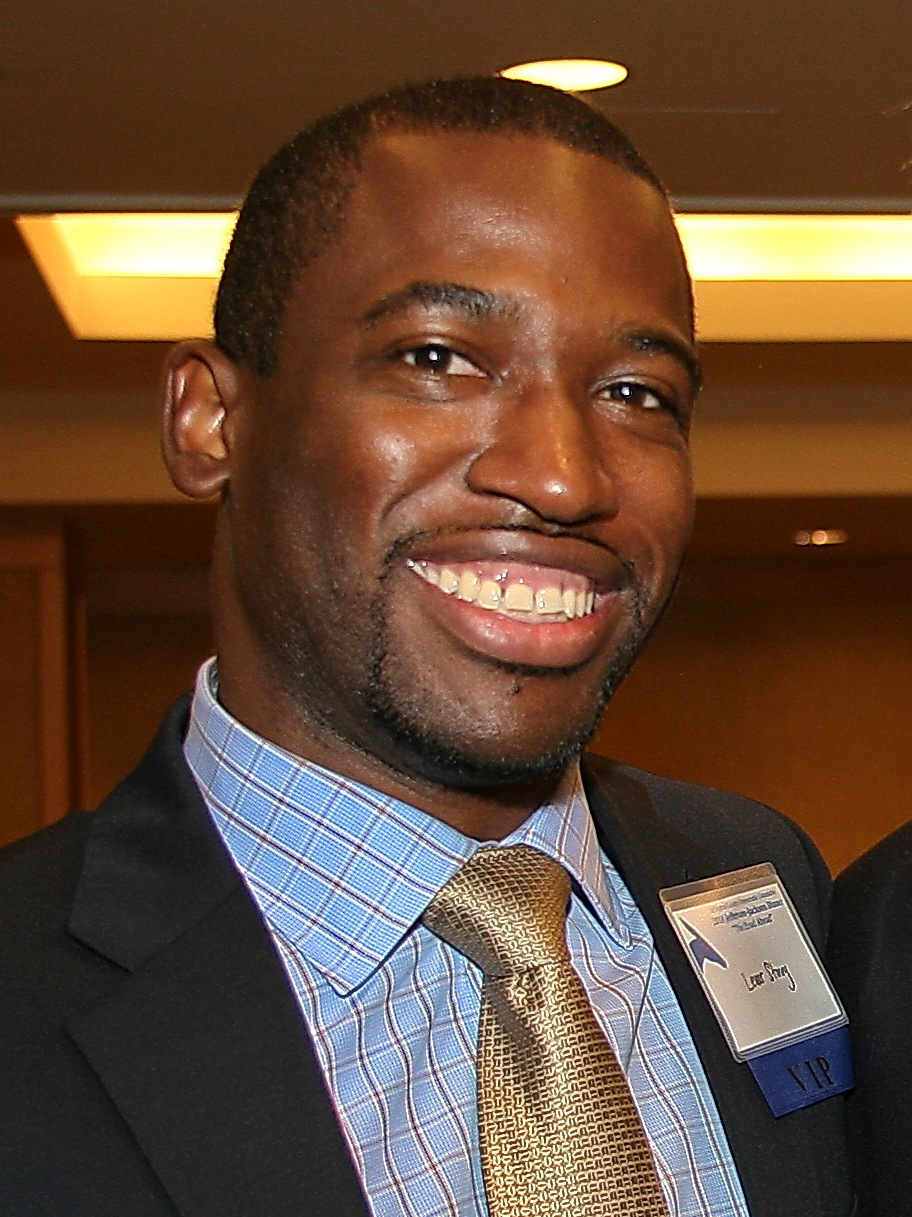

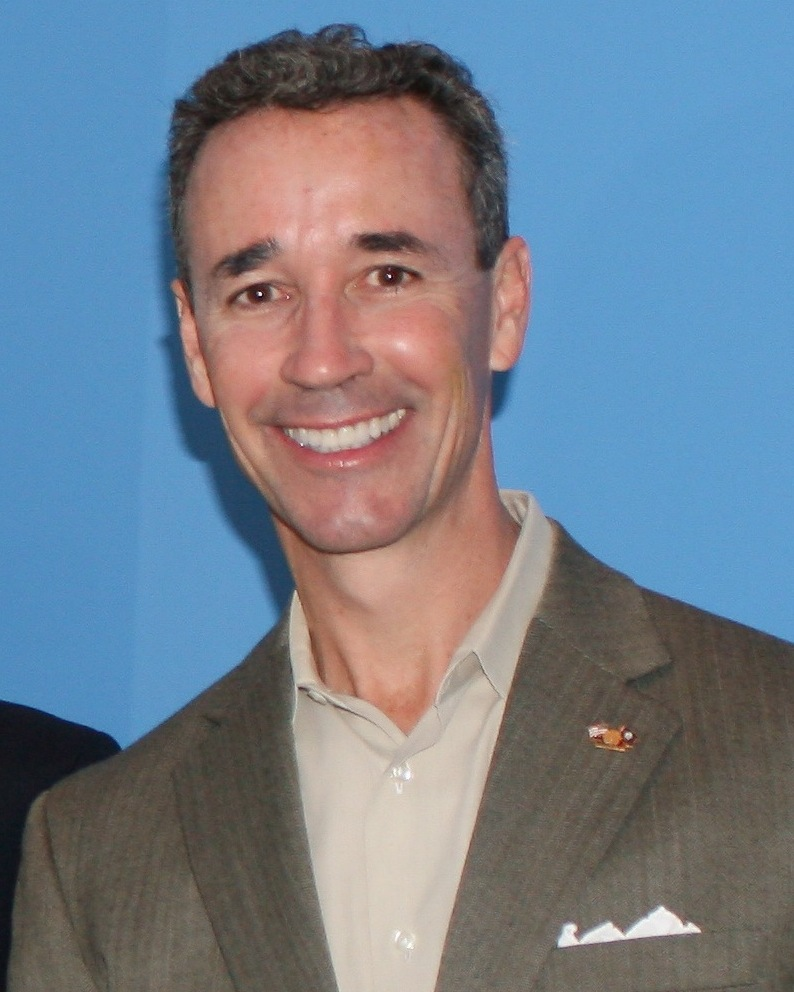

Nominee	Levar Stoney	Jack Berry
Party	Democratic	Democratic
Popular vote	35,525	33,447
Percentage	35.64%	33.56%
Nominee	Joe Morrissey	Michelle Mosby
Party	Independent	Democratic
Popular vote	20,995	5,792
Percentage	21.06%	5.81%
- Precinct results Stoney: 30-40% 40-50% 50-60% 60-70% Berry: 30-40% 40-50% 50-60% 60-70% 70-80% 80-90% Morrissey: 30-40% 40-50% 50-60%
Mayor before election
Dwight Jones
Democratic
Elected mayor
Levar Stoney
Democratic

Richmond, Virginia, held a general election on November 8, 2016. Voters elected the Mayor of Richmond, Virginia, members of the Richmond City Council, as well as several other local officials.

In an officially nonpartisan, three-way race, Levar Stoney, the former state Secretary of the Commonwealth, defeated Jack Berry, former Hanover County Administrator, and Joe Morrissey, former delegate to the Virginia House of Delegates. Former councilperson Michelle Mosby, finished in a distant third. On January 1, 2017, Stoney took office as the 80th mayor of Richmond, Virginia.

In the Richmond mayoral election, in addition to winning the popular vote, mayoral candidates must win the popular vote in five of the nine city districts. Stoney was able to achieve a majority of the popular vote, receiving 35,525 votes, in addition to winning five city districts, compared to three won by Berry and one won by Morrissey. The night of November 8, the Morrissey campaign conceded to Berry and Stoney, and Berry's campaign conceded to Stoney the following day, when provisional and absentee ballots still had Stoney in the lead.

At the age of 35, Stoney became the youngest politician to ever be elected as the Mayor of Richmond. On November 12, 2016, the Stoney campaign began the transition team between his administration, and Jones' departing administration.

Six days before the election, Jon Baliles dropped out of the race, calling on supporters to select someone else even though his name would still appear on the ballot; he cited a desire to avoid vote-splitting so that Morrissey would lose. Political experts predicted that Stoney would win more of Baliles' voters, given that the two candidates were ideologically similar. Berry commended Baliles' character for this decision.

== Background ==
Incumbent Democrat Dwight C. Jones was ineligible to seek re-election due to mayoral term limits. The election was the fourth citywide election for mayor through popular vote. The election is nonpartisan, meaning no candidate can be affiliated with any party on the ticket.

== Candidates ==
=== Declared ===
- Jon Baliles, 1st District City Councilman and former City Planner for Richmond
- Jack Berry, Venture Richmond director and former Hanover County administrator
- Bobby Junes, retired real estate consultant
- Joe Morrissey, former State Delegate and former Richmond Commonwealth's Attorney
- Michelle Mosby, President of the Richmond City Council
- Levar Stoney, former Secretary of the Commonwealth of Virginia
- Bruce Tyler, former Richmond City Councilman and 2015 Republican State Senate candidate (withdrew September 27, but will remain on the ballot)
- Lawrence E. Williams, architect and candidate for Mayor in 2004 and 2008

=== Withdrawn ===
- Mike Dickinson, strip club owner and perennial candidate
- Lillie Estes, community strategist, former substitute teacher and former member of the Richmond Anti-Poverty Commission
- Brad Froman, businessman and write-in candidate for U.S. Senate in 2014
- L. Shirley Harvey, former Richmond City Councilwoman and perennial candidate
- Chad Ingold, teacher at Richmond City Public Schools
- Nate Peterson, medical administrator
- Amon Rayford
- Chuck Richardson, former Richmond City Councilman
- Alan Schintzius, carpenter and former Occupy Richmond activist
- Rick Tatnall, community activist and candidate in 2012

=== Declined ===
- Jeff Bourne, Chairman of the Richmond School Board (running for re-election)
- Chris Hilbert, 3rd District City Councilman (running for re-election)
- Delores McQuinn, State Delegate and former Richmond City Councilwoman
- Charles Samuels, Richmond City Councilman

=== Endorsements ===
Jon Baliles

Media

- RVA Magazine
- Our Revolution RVA
Jack Berry

Individuals

- Viola Baskerville, former State Delegate and former Richmond City Councilwoman
- Bill Johnson, former Richmond City Council member
- Ted Ukrop, of the Ukrop's, a local grocery chain in the region.

Organizations

- Richmond Association of Realtors
Levar Stoney

Individuals

- Lamont Bagby, State Delegate
- Anne Holton, former Virginia Secretary of Education
- Terry McAuliffe, Governor of Virginia
- Jennifer McClellan, State Delegate
- Delores McQuinn, State Delegate and former Richmond City Councilwoman
- Tyrone Nelson, Chairman of the Henrico County Board of Supervisors
- Bill Pantele, former Richmond City Councilman and candidate for Mayor of Richmond in 2008
- Susan Swecker, Chairwoman of the Democratic Party of Virginia

Organizations

- Home Building Association of Richmond
- Richmond City Democratic Committee
- Richmond Education Association
- SEIU

== Polling ==
Early polling suggested that Joe Morrissey is the front-runner in the mayoral election, followed by Jack Berry.

Poll source	Date(s) administered	Sample size	Margin of error	Jon Baliles	Jack Berry	Joe Morrissey	Michelle Mosby	Levar Stoney	Bruce Tyler	Other/Undecided
CNU	August 24 – 30, 2016	600	±4.9%	9%	16%	28%	10%	7%	4%	18%
American Strategies	September 17 – 21, 2016	600	±4.0%	12%	25%	29%	7%	14%	—	11%

== Results ==
Richmond mayoral election, 2016
Party	Candidate	Votes	%
Democratic	Levar Stoney	35,525	35.64
Democratic	Jack Berry	33,447	33.56
Independent	Joe Morrissey	20,995	21.06
Democratic	Michelle Mosby	5,792	5.81
Democratic	Jon Baliles (withdrew)	2,230	2.24
Independent	Lawrence Williams	543	0.54
Republican	Bruce Tyler (withdrew)	500	0.50
Independent	Bobby Junes (withdrew)	381	0.38
Write-in		255	0.26
Total votes		99,668	100
Democratic hold			

== See also ==
- 2016 Virginia elections
