= Tiffany Jana =

Business management consultant

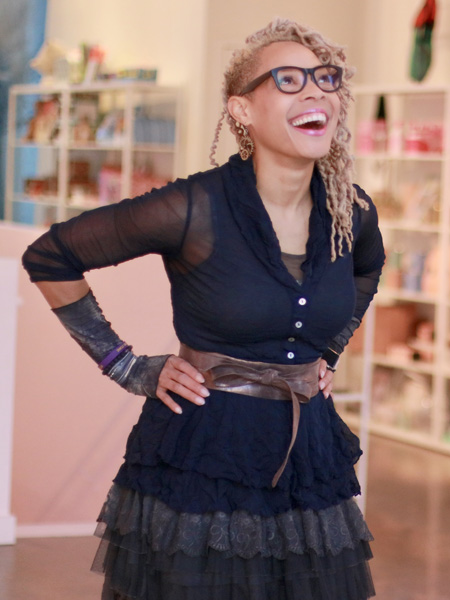
- Born: June 13, 1977 (age 49); El Paso, Texas, U.S.
- Education: University of Phoenix (BS, MBA, DM)
- Occupations: Diversity Consultant, Author
- Years active: 2003–present

Tiffany Jana (born June 13, 1977) is the founder of TMI Consulting Incorporated, a diversity and inclusion management consulting firm founded in 2003 and headquartered in Richmond, Virginia. TMI Consulting is a benefit corporation as well as a certified B Corporation and earned the 2016 Best for the World honor from the nonprofit B Lab that certifies B Corps worldwide.

Jana is the co-author, with Matthew Freeman, of Overcoming Bias: Building Authentic Relationships across Differences (2016, Berrett-Koehler), as well as co-author, with Ashley Diaz Mejias, of Erasing Institutional Bias: How to Create Systemic Change for Organizational Inclusion (2018, Berrett-Koehler). The former received an endorsement from 2016 Vice-Presidential candidate Tim Kaine. TMI Consulting is featured in The B Corp Handbook: How to Use Business as a Force for Good by Ryan Honeyman and, more recently, Jana has become the co-author, with Honeyman, of the second edition of The B Corp Handbook (2019, Berrett-Koehler). Jana helped rewrite the new edition from a perspective of diversity, equity, and inclusion. Launched April 23, 2019, the second edition was an instant best-seller on Amazon, hitting #1 in New Release in Green Business, #3 in Green Business overall, and #8 in Corporate Governance on the first day (and improving those positions on day two to #1 in Green Business, #1 in Corporate Governance, and #3 in Environmental Economics). The B Corp Handbook 2nd Edition was awarded an IPPY medal in Business Category (45) of the 2020 Independent Publisher Book Awards.

Jana's fourth book, co-authored with Michael Baran is titled Subtle Acts of Exclusion: How to Understand, Identify, and Stop Microaggressions (2020, Berrett-Koehler). The day after Subtle Acts of Exclusion launched, Jana and Baran presented the book with its subtle acts of exclusion term for microaggressions at the Forum on Workplace Inclusion, the largest diversity, equity and inclusion conference in the United States. Their session was called "There's Nothing Micro About Microaggressions". Four months before the book went on sale, Publishers Weekly featured it in an article about up and coming books. Subtle Acts of Exclusion went on to win two international awards: the getAbstract Readers’ Choice 2020 International Book Award and the 2020 McAdam Book Award.

In December 2012, Jana gave a talk as part of TEDxRVAWomen. In 2013, Jana was a winner of both the Style Weekly Top 40 Under 40 award and the Women Worth Watching award from Diversity Journal. In 2017, Jana was one of the winners of the 2017 Enterprising Women of the Year Award from Enterprising Women magazine.

Jana is an international public speaker, having provided the keynote address for the 2015 Hong Kong Social Enterprise Summit, and the Dialogues for Change in several German cities including Berlin, Leipzig, Ludwigsburg, and Bottrop. They participated on a panel as part of Adweek's 2016 Adweek New York conference at Thomson Reuters featuring her book. In August, 2015, Jana was appointed for a 5-year term by the Governor of Virginia, Terry McAuliffe to the board of trustees of the Science Museum of Virginia. On November 11, 2016, Mayor-elect of Richmond, VA, Levar Stoney named them as co-chair (with lobbyist and former gubernatorial aide Bill Leighty) of his transition team. Jana was appointed to a four-year term on the board of directors of the Richmond Economic Development Authority on January 9, 2017 and was subsequently named one of Inc. magazine's Top 100 Leadership Speakers for 2018. They were appointed to the Virginia 2020 Census Complete Count Commission by Governor Ralph Northam in January 2019.

Jana identifies as gender fluid and non-binary, and prefers singular they pronouns.
