= Jeff Bourne =

Jeff Bourne may refer to:

- Jeff Bourne (footballer) (1948–2014), English footballer/soccer player who played in England and the U.S.
- Jeff Bourne (politician) (born 1976), Virginia attorney and member of the Virginia House of Delegates
