= Jeff Bourne (politician) =

American lawyer and politician

Member of the Virginia House of Delegates from the 71st district
- In office February 8, 2017 – January 10, 2024
- Preceded by: Jennifer McClellan
- Succeeded by: Amanda Batten (redistricting)

Personal details
- Born: Jeffrey Michael Bourne; 1976 (age 49–50) Hartford, Connecticut, U.S.
- Party: Democratic
- Education: College of William & Mary (BA, JD)

Jeffrey Michael Bourne (born 1976) is an American attorney and politician. He was a member of the Virginia House of Delegates from 2017 to 2024, representing the 71st district. Bourne took office after winning a special election on February 7, 2017, to fill the seat vacated by Jennifer McClellan's election to the Senate of Virginia.

== Early life and education ==
Born in Hartford, Connecticut, Bourne was raised in Wytheville, VA and attended George Wythe High School. He earned a Bachelor of Arts degree in economics from the College of William & Mary in 1999 and a Juris Doctor from the William & Mary Law School in 2007.

== Career ==
Bourne works as a deputy attorney general for the state of Virginia. Previously, he has been deputy chief of staff to Richmond mayor Dwight Clinton Jones and head of government relations at the Richmond Redevelopment and Housing Authority.

In 2013, Bourne was elected to the Richmond School Board, representing the North Side 3rd district and serving two years as the board's chair. He was reelected in November 2016.

On February 7, 2017, Bourne won a special election to serve as the 71st District's Representative to the Virginia House of Delegates. He is a member of the Virginia Legislative Black Caucus.

After Congressman Donald McEachin died on November 28, 2022, Bourne was referenced as a possible candidate for the special election to fill his vacant House seat. Bourne later told Axios that he would not run for the seat.

=== Legislative issues ===
Bourne's top legislative priorities are expanding educational opportunities to all students, providing schools with the resources they need, increasing housing availability and affordability in Richmond, and preserving Virginia's environment for the next generation.

The Virginia Education Association Fund for Children and Public Education has endorsed him because he has consistently voted for legislation supporting public education.

== Personal life ==
Bourne is married and has two children.
