= Jessica Anderson (politician) =

American politician

Jessica L. Anderson

Member of the Virginia House of Delegates from the 71st district
- Incumbent
- Assumed office January 14, 2026
- Preceded by: Amanda Batten

Personal details
- Party: Democratic
- Education: Virginia Peninsula Community College
- Website: jess4va.com

Jessica L. Anderson is an American politician and the Delegate for the 71st district of the Virginia House of Delegates. A member of the Democratic Party, she was elected to the seat in the 2025 Virginia House of Delegates election with 53% of the vote, defeating incumbent Republican Amanda Batten. The 71st district is composed of the City of Williamsburg and parts of the counties of James City and New Kent.

== Early life and education ==
Anderson was born in Newport News in 1981. She earned an Associate of Science degree in business administration from Thomas Nelson Community College in 2007.

== Career ==
Anderson has worked in public schools in the Williamsburg area, including as a front office receptionist at a public elementary school. She has participated in the Sorensen Institute for Political Leadership's Political Leaders Program in 2024, and has been affiliated with the Williamsburg-James City Education Association and Colonial Road Runners.

== Political career ==
=== 2023 election ===
Anderson ran for the 71st district seat in 2023 and lost to Republican incumbent Amanda Batten by 667 votes. During the campaign, Anderson supported maintaining abortion access under Virginia law and opposed book bans in public school libraries.

=== 2025 election ===
Anderson ran again in 2025 in a rematch against Batten and won the general election, flipping the seat for Democrats. Anderson had raised about $1.4 million in the 2025 cycle as of October 2025, compared with about $874,000 for Batten.

== Political positions ==
In 2023, Anderson said she preferred shortening Virginia's early-voting window from 45 days to roughly 30 days, while retaining required weekend voting opportunities.
