= Robert B. Ball =

American politician from Virginia

Member of the Virginia House of Delegates
- In office 1971–1981
- Constituency: 32nd district
- In office January 12, 1983 – January 10, 1996
- Succeeded by: Donald McEachin
- Constituency: 74th district

Personal details
- Born: September 28, 1917 Caroline County, Virginia
- Died: September 2, 2006 (aged 88) Henrico County, Virginia
- Party: Democratic
- Spouse: Edna Hurt
- Children: 2

Military service
- Branch/service: United States Marine Corps; Virginia National Guard
- Rank: Sergeant
- Battles/wars: World War II

Robert Bates Ball Sr. (September 28, 1917 – September 2, 2006) was a Virginia politician for the Virginia House of Delegates. Ball was a member of the Republican Party, and was a member of the Virginia House of Delegates from 1971 to 1996. Ball had served the 32nd district between 1971 and 1981, and the 74th district between 1983 and 1996, making him the longest serving delegate for the 74th district.
