= Fourth Baptist Church =

Historic church in Virginia, US

- U.S. National Register of Historic Places
- Virginia Landmarks Register
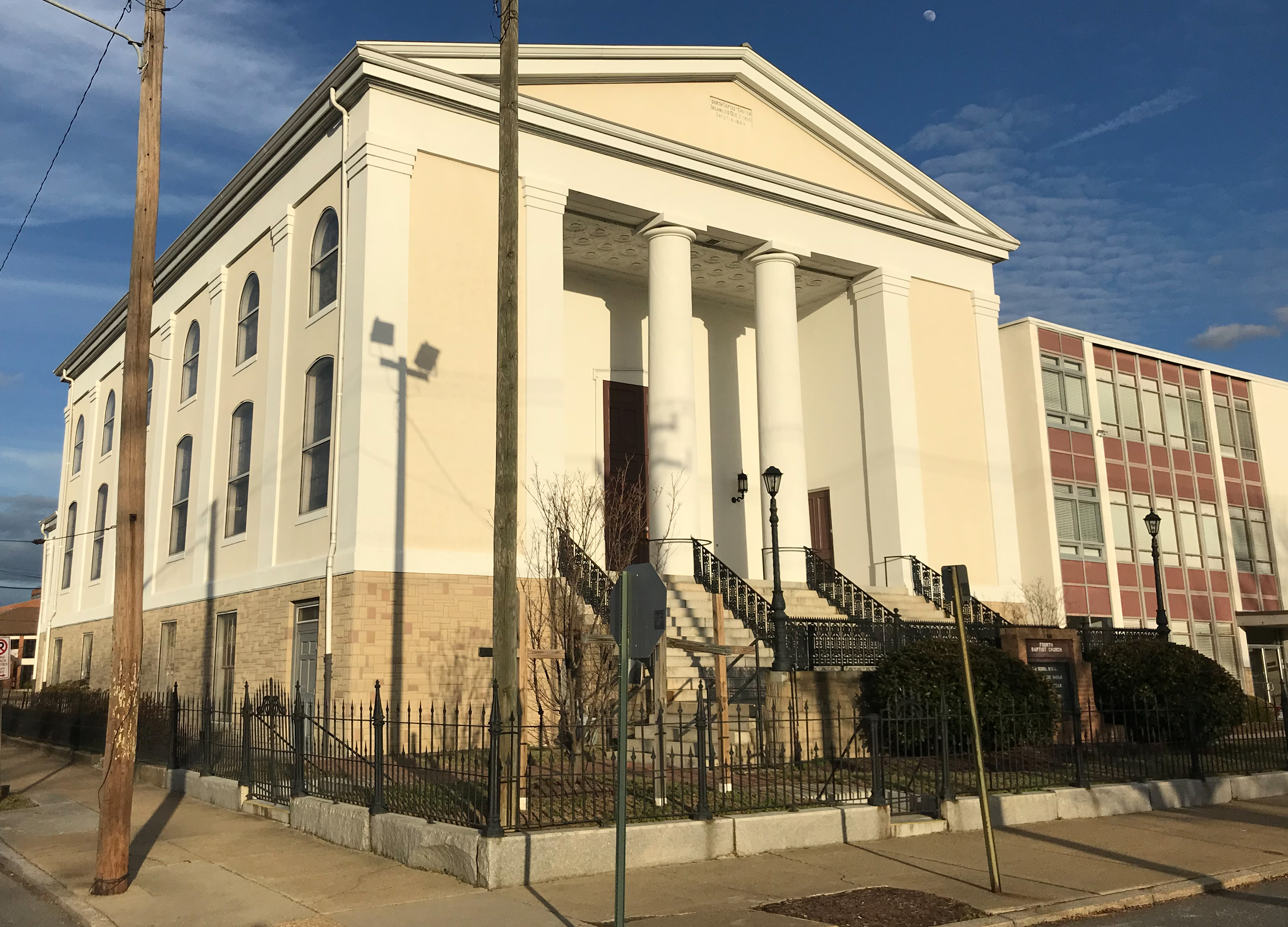
- Fourth Baptist Church in 2018

- Location within Virginia Location within the United States
- Location: 2800 P St., Richmond, Virginia
- Coordinates: 37°32′9″N 77°24′36″W
- Area: 1 acre (0.40 ha)
- Built: 1884
- Architectural style: Gothic Revival
- NRHP reference No.: 79003291
- VLR No.: 127-0318

Significant dates
- Added to NRHP: September 7, 1979
- Designated VLR: May 15, 1979

Fourth Baptist Church is a Baptist church located in Richmond, Virginia. It was built in 1884, and is a three-story, Greek Revival style stuccoed brick structure. It features a distyle portico in antis elevated on a high podium. It consists of two unfluted Doric order columns and paired pilasters supporting a Doric entablature. Attached to the church is a Sunday School building erected in 1964.

The addition was designed by Ethel Bailey Furman (1893-1976), the first Black woman to practice architecture in the Commonwealth of Virginia.

It was listed on the National Register of Historic Places in 1979. A former pastor was Richmond mayor Leonidas B. Young, II, who was convicted of defrauding the city at one point during his career.
