= Jennifer McClellan =

American politician (born 1972)

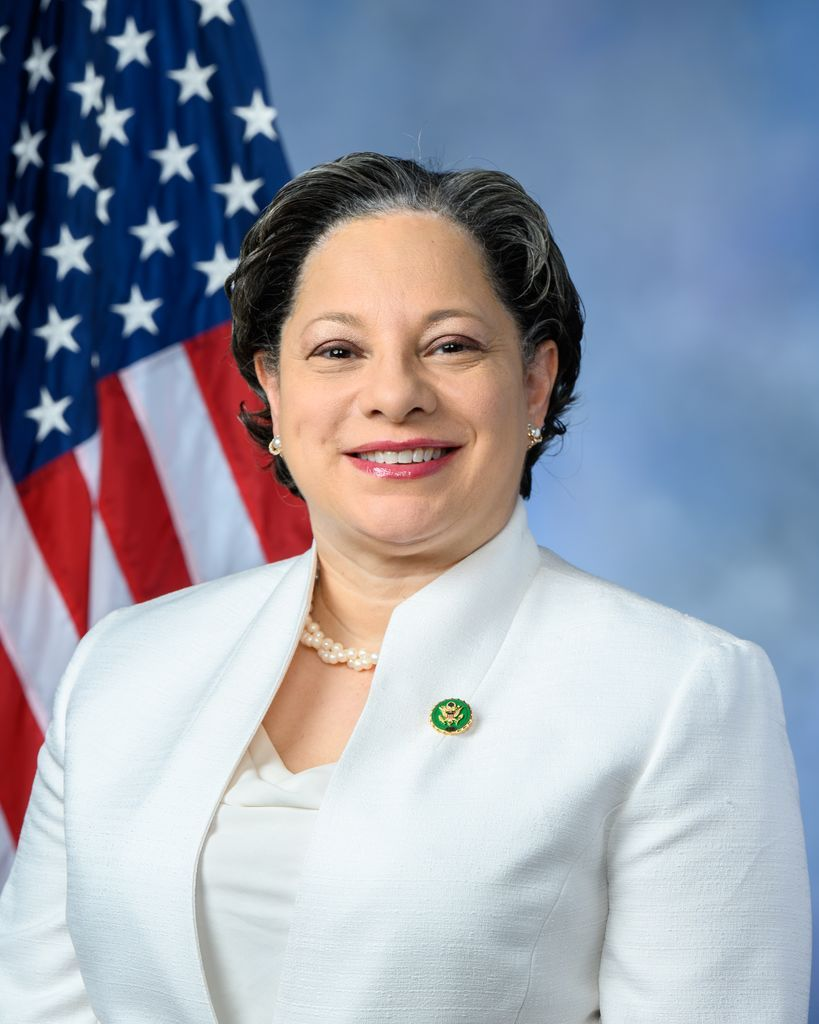
- Official portrait, 2023

Member of the U.S. House of Representatives from Virginia's 4th district
- Incumbent
- Assumed office February 21, 2023 (Note: McClellan's official service begins on the date of the special election, while she was not sworn in until March 7, 2023.)
- Preceded by: Donald McEachin

Member of the Virginia Senate from the 9th district
- In office January 13, 2017 – March 7, 2023
- Preceded by: Donald McEachin
- Succeeded by: Lamont Bagby

Member of the Virginia House of Delegates from the 71st district
- In office January 11, 2006 – January 13, 2017
- Preceded by: Viola Baskerville
- Succeeded by: Jeff Bourne

Personal details
- Born: Jennifer Leigh McClellan; December 28, 1972 (age 53) Petersburg, Virginia, U.S.
- Party: Democratic
- Spouse: David Mills (m. 2008)
- Children: 2
- Education: University of Richmond (BA); University of Virginia (JD)
- Website: House website Campaign website
- McClellan's voice McClellan on the need to raise the debt ceiling and avoid a default. Recorded May 24, 2023

Jennifer Leigh McClellan (born December 28, 1972) is an American politician and attorney who has served as the U.S. representative for Virginia's 4th congressional district since 2023. A member of the Democratic Party, she represented the 9th district in the Virginia State Senate from 2017 to 2023 and the 71st district in the Virginia House of Delegates from 2006 to 2017. She ran in the Democratic primary for governor of Virginia in the 2021 election, losing to former governor Terry McAuliffe.

McClellan was the Democratic nominee in the 2023 Virginia's 4th congressional district special election, and defeated Republican nominee Leon Benjamin with 74.4% of the vote. She is the first Black woman elected to Congress from Virginia.

== Early life and education ==
McClellan was born in Petersburg, Virginia. Her father, James Fennimore McClellan Jr., was a professor at Virginia State University, where her mother, Lois Dedeaux McClellan, worked as a counselor. Both her parents were involved in civil rights activism. She attended Matoaca High School in Chesterfield County, where she was valedictorian.

She earned a Bachelor of Arts in English and political science from the University of Richmond in 1994, and a Juris Doctor from the University of Virginia School of Law in 1997.

== Early career ==
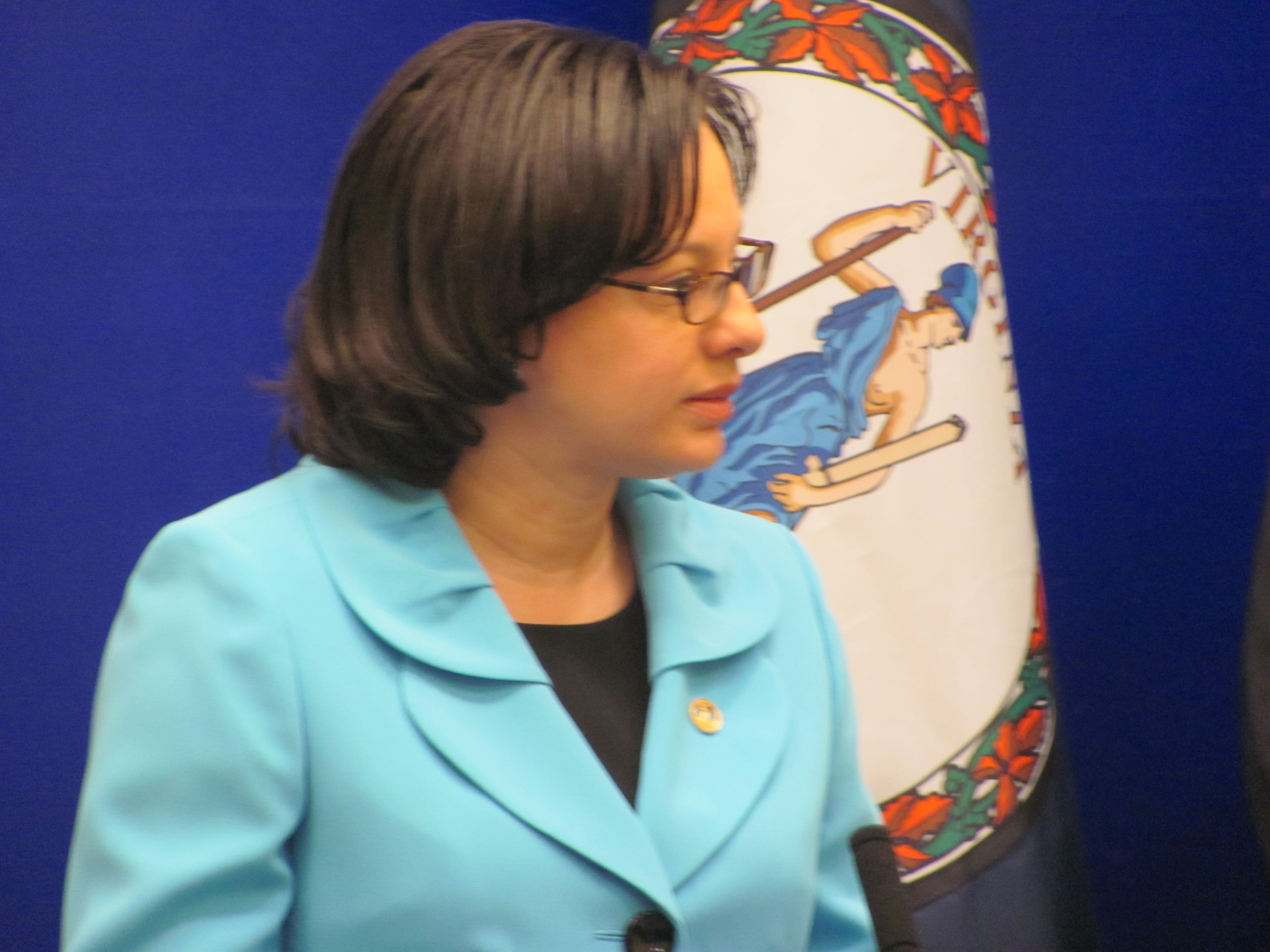
McClellan speaking at the Virginia Pension Protection Coalition press conference in March 2012

After law school, McClellan began practicing law at Hunton & Williams. She has also worked as regulatory counsel for Verizon Communications.

=== Virginia House of Delegates ===
In 2005, she ran for office for the first time, seeking the Virginia House of Delegates seat vacated by Viola Baskerville, who stepped down to run for lieutenant governor of Virginia. McClellan won the election and from 2006 to 2017 represented the 71st district in the House of Delegates, which comprised parts of the city of Richmond and Henrico County.

McClellan has served as vice chair of the Democratic Party of Virginia. As the highest-ranking female party officer, she was also automatically a member of the Democratic National Committee (DNC). As a DNC member, she was a superdelegate to the 2008 Democratic National Convention. She has also served as vice chair of the Virginia Legislative Black Caucus and became the first pregnant Virginia delegate to participate in a legislative session.

McClellan was an outspoken critic of Governor Bob McDonnell's efforts to overhaul Virginia's pension system in 2012. She opposed the cuts to retirement benefits for teachers and public safety employees, and argued that Republican lawmakers had rushed the legislation to minimize any scrutiny from Democrats and labor unions.

=== Virginia Senate ===
McClellan was elected to the Virginia Senate in a special election on January 10, 2017, to fill the 9th district seat vacated by Donald McEachin's election to the U.S. House of Representatives. She defeated Libertarian Party nominee Corey Fauconier. In the race, she was endorsed by McEachin, as well as Richmond Mayor Levar Stoney, U.S. Senators Tim Kaine and Mark Warner, and Governor Terry McAuliffe. Her seat had once been held by former Governor L. Douglas Wilder.

In 2019, McClellan co-sponsored the Repeal Act, which would have lifted some of Virginia's restrictions on abortion. In 2020, she introduced legislation to help end the school-to-prison pipeline by training school resource officers in adolescent psychology. She has also sponsored the Virginia Clean Economy Act and the Voting Rights Act of Virginia, both of which were signed into law. She called the passage of the Voting Rights Act "a huge victory for our democracy. While other states are threatening voting rights, Virginia took a major step today to protect the right to vote." She led the commissioning of the Emancipation and Freedom Monument, which was installed on Brown's Island in September 2021.

=== 2021 gubernatorial campaign ===
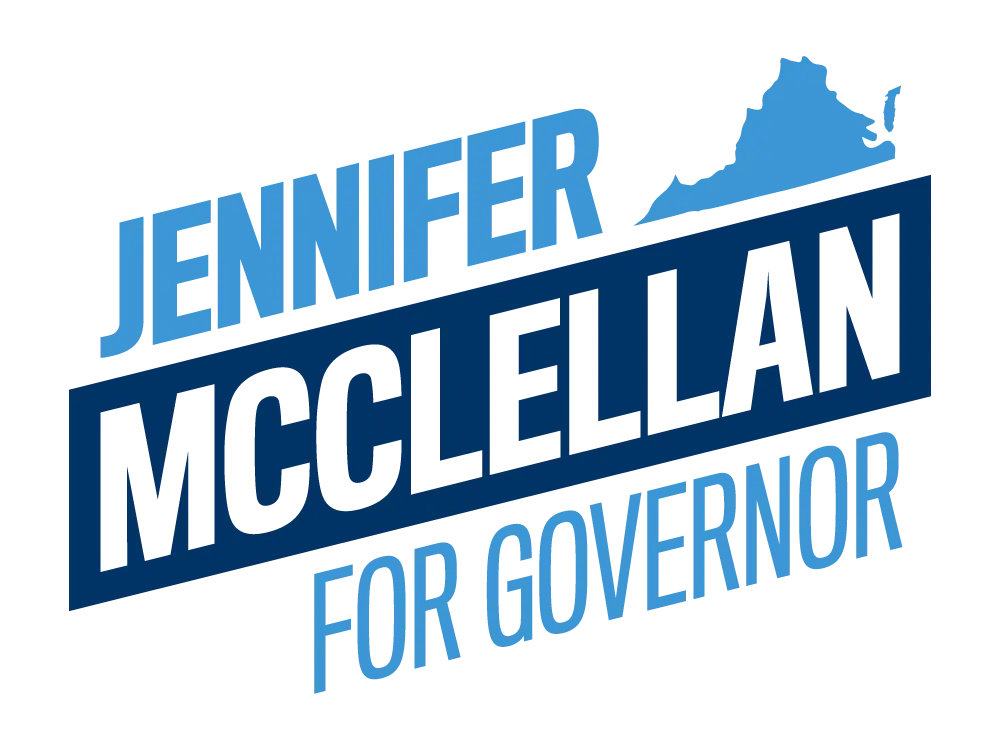
2021 gubernatorial campaign logo

In June 2020, McClellan announced her candidacy for governor of Virginia in 2021. In a Democratic primary debate at Virginia State University, she called herself a "nominee who will excite and expand our base. I’ve spent 31 years building this party and electing Democrats at the local, state and national level. It’s not enough to give someone something to vote against. We’ve got to give people something to vote for." Her campaign was attacked by Senate colleague Amanda Chase, who claimed that McClellan's leadership role in the Legislative Black Caucus disqualified her from representing all Virginians as governor (Chase was later censured for her racist remark, among other controversies).

Former governor Terry McAuliffe, whose transition team McClellan led when he was elected in 2013, won the nomination, with former state delegate Jennifer Carroll Foy taking a distant second place and McClellan not far behind in third. McAuliffe went on to narrowly lose the general election to Republican nominee Glenn Youngkin. Had either McClellan or Carroll Foy won the election, she would have become the first female governor of Virginia, the second Black governor of Virginia after Douglas Wilder, and the first Black female U.S. governor.

== U.S. House of Representatives ==
=== Elections ===
==== 2023 special ====
McClellan was the Democratic nominee in the 2023 special election for Virginia's 4th congressional district; the seat became vacant when incumbent Donald McEachin died from colorectal cancer on November 28, 2022. She won a firehouse primary on December 20, 2022, then defeated pastor Leon Benjamin in the general election on February 21, 2023. She is the first Black woman elected to Congress from Virginia. She was sworn in on March 7, 2023.

==== 2024 ====
McClellan ran for reelection in 2024 and was unopposed in the Democratic primary. She defeated the Republican in the general election with 67% of the vote.

==== 2026 ====
McClellan soundly defeated a Republican opponent in the federal House race, maintaining her incumbency with a comfortable 72% of the vote.

=== Caucus memberships ===
- Black Maternal Health Caucus
- Congressional Black Caucus
- Congressional Equality Caucus
- Congressional Caucus for the Equal Rights Amendment (co-chair)
- Congressional Progressive Caucus
- Congressional Ukraine Caucus
- New Democrat Coalition

=== Committee assignments ===
- Committee on Armed Services
- Committee on Science, Space, and Technology

== Personal life ==
McClellan married David Mills on November 15, 2008. Her mentor, Tim Kaine, officiated the wedding ceremony. She and her husband live in Richmond with their two children. She is a Presbyterian.

== Electoral history ==
2017 Virginia Senate special election, District 9
Party	Candidate	Votes	%
Democratic	Jennifer McClellan	7,849	91.3
Libertarian	Corey Falconer	692	8.1
Total votes		8,596	100.0
Democratic hold			

2019 Virginia Senate election, District 9
Party	Candidate	Votes	%
Democratic	Jennifer McClellan (incumbent)	49,451	80.1
Libertarian	Mark Lewis	11,707	19.0
Total votes		61,771	100.0
Democratic hold			

2021 Virginia gubernatorial Democratic primary
Party	Candidate	Votes	%
Democratic	Terry McAuliffe	307,367	62.10
Democratic	Jennifer Carroll Foy	98,052	19.81
Democratic	Jennifer McClellan	58,213	11.76
Democratic	Justin Fairfax	17,606	3.56
Democratic	Lee J. Carter	13,694	2.77
Total votes		494,932	100.0

2023 Virginia's 4th congressional district Democratic firehouse primary results
Party	Candidate	Votes	%
Democratic	Jennifer McClellan	23,661	84.8
Democratic	Joe Morrissey	3,782	13.6
Democratic	Tavorise Marks	217	0.8
Democratic	Joseph Preston	174	0.6
	Unallocated	66	0.2
Total votes		27,900	100.0

2023 Virginia's 4th congressional district special election
Party	Candidate	Votes	%	±%
Democratic	Jennifer McClellan	82,040	74.41	+9.49
Republican	Leon Benjamin	28,083	25.47	−9.43
Write-in		129	0.12	-0.06
Total votes		110,252	100.0	
Democratic hold				

2024 Virginia's 4th congressional district election
Party	Candidate	Votes	%	±%
Democratic	Jennifer McClellan (incumbent)	252,885	67.34	−7.07
Republican	William Moher III	121,814	32.44	+6.97
Write-in		809	0.22	+0.10
Total votes		375,508	100.0	
Democratic hold				

== See also ==
- List of African-American United States representatives
- Women in the United States House of Representatives

U.S. House of Representatives
Preceded by Donald McEachin	Member of the U.S. House of Representatives from Virginia's 4th congressional district 2023–present	Incumbent
U.S. order of precedence (ceremonial)
Preceded by Gabe Vasquez	United States representatives by seniority 355th	Succeeded by Gabe Amo
