= 2016 Virginia elections =

- November 8, 2016

Federal and municipal elections were held in the U.S. state of Virginia on November 8, 2016. All of Virginia's House of Representatives seats were up for re-election. Primary elections for Congress were held on June 14, 2016, and primary elections for president were held on March 1, 2016.

== Federal elections ==
=== President of the United States ===
==== Primary elections ====
All four major party candidates on the ballot won their state primaries. Hillary Clinton defeated Bernie Sanders in the Democratic primary by 64–35 percent margin. Donald Trump defeated Marco Rubio by a 34–31. Additionally, in the Republican primary, Ted Cruz, John Kasich and Ben Carson earned enough votes in Virginia's primary to receive delegates, although they all suspended their campaign before the 2016 Republican National Convention. The Libertarian Party did not hold a primary in Virginia, where Gary Johnson received acclamation. Jill Stein defeated Kent Mesplay by a 76–6 percent margin in the state's Green Party primary. Mesplay and Stein were the only two candidates on the ballot to receive delegates to send to the 2016 Green National Convention.

The Democratic Party candidate, former secretary of state Hillary Clinton of New York, carried Virginia with 49.8% of the popular vote against businessman Donald Trump of New York, who carried 44.4%, a victory margin of 5.4%. Clinton seemed to benefit from having Tim Kaine on the ticket. Whereas the national popular vote swung 1.9% Republican from the previous election, Virginia swung 1.37% Democratic. Virginia was among the eleven states in which Hillary Clinton outperformed Barack Obama's margin in 2012.

Trump became the first Republican candidate since Calvin Coolidge in 1924 to win the White House without carrying Virginia. It has not voted Republican in 12 years. Before 2008, Virginia had not voted for a Democrat since 1964. Virginia is appearing to become traditionally Democratic for the first time in nearly 70 years. This is due largely to migration into counties in Northern Virginia close to Washington D.C., which has tilted those densely populated areas towards the Democratic Party. Virginia was the only state in the eleven former states that belonged to the Confederate States of America to vote Democratic. This is a reversal from 1976, when it was the only state that had belonged to the CSA to vote Republican.

==== General election ====
United States presidential election in Virginia, 2016
Party	Candidate	Running mate	Votes	Percentage	Electoral votes
Democratic	Hillary Clinton	Tim Kaine	1,981,473	49.75%	13
Republican	Donald Trump	Mike Pence	1,769,443	44.43%	0
Libertarian	Gary Johnson	William Weld	118,274	2.97%	0
Independent	Evan McMullin	Mindy Finn	54,054	1.36%	0
Green	Jill Stein	Ajamu Baraka	27,638	0.69%	0
Independent (Write-in)	-	-	31,870	0.80%	0
Totals			3,982,752	100.00%	13
Voter turnout (Voting age population)					71.30%
Source: Virginia Department of Elections

== Ballot Measures ==
Voters rejected Question 1 to place a right-to-work provision in the state constitution, but passed Question 2 to grant a property tax exemption to a surviving spouse of an emergency service (police, firefighter, emergency medical services, or search and rescue) employee that was killed in action if the spouse uses the property as their primary residence and they have not remarried.

== Citywide elections ==
The cities of Richmond and Virginia Beach had municipal citywide elections for mayor and city council. Democratic candidate, Levar Stoney was elected as mayor of Richmond. Incumbent Republican, Will Sessoms was reelected as mayor of Virginia Beach. Democrat Kenny Alexander won the election as mayor of Norfolk.
