= Virginia Legislative Black Caucus =

The Virginia Legislative Black Caucus is an American political organization composed of Black members elected to the Virginia General Assembly.

== Mission ==
The Virginia Legislative Black Caucus (VLBC) is committed to improving the economic, educational, political, and social conditions of African Americans, as well as historically underrepresented groups in Virginia. A vital part of VLBC’s mission is to raise the consciousness of other groups to the contributions made by African Americans to the Commonwealth and the Nation.

== Current membership ==
List of officers:

District	Officers	Position
74 (House)	Del. Lamont Bagby	Chair
95 (House)	Del. Marcia Price	Secretary
11 (House)	Del. Sam Rasoul	Treasurer
52 (House)	Del. Luke Torian	Chaplain

=== Current members ===
1. Virginia State Del. Lamont Bagby (D-74th)
2. Virginia State Del. Jeff Bourne (D-71st)
3. Virginia State Del. Nadarius Clark (D-79th)
4. Virginia State Del. Jackie Glass (politician) (D-89th)
5. Virginia State Del. Cliff Hayes (D-77th)
6. Virginia State Del. Charniele Herring (D-46th)
7. Virginia State Del. Clinton Jenkins (D-76th)
8. Virginia State Sen. Mamie Locke (D-2nd)
9. Virginia State Sen. Louise Lucas (D-18th)
10. Virginia State Del. Michelle Maldonado (D-50th)
11. Virginia State Sen. Jennifer McClellan (D-9th)
12. Virginia State Del. Delores McQuinn (D-70th)
13. Virginia State Del. Candi Mundon King (D-2nd)
14. Virginia State Del. Marcia Price (D-95th)
15. Virginia State Del. Sam Rasoul (D-11th)
16. Virginia State Del. Briana Sewell (D-51st)
17. Virginia State Del. Don Scott (D-80th)
18. Virginia State Sen. Lionell Spruill, Sr. (D-5th)
19. Virginia State Del. Luke Torian (D-52nd)
20. Virginia State Del. Jeion Ward (D-92nd)
21. Virginia State Del. Angelia Williams Graves (D-90th)

=== Past members ===
- Virginia State Sen. Henry L. Marsh (D-16th) Dinwiddie and Petersburg. Part of Chesterfield, Hopewell, Prince George, and Richmond City
- Virginia State Sen. Yvonne B. Miller (D-5th) Chesapeake, Norfolk, and Virginia Beach
- Virginia State Del. Kenneth Cooper Alexander (D-89th) Norfolk
- Virginia State Del. Mamye BaCote (D-95th) Hampton and Newport News
- Virginia State Del. Rosalyn Dance (D-63rd) Chesterfield, Dinwiddie, and Petersburg
- Virginia State Del. Algie Howell (D-90th) Chesapeake, Norfolk, and Virginia Beach
- Virginia State Del. Matthew James (D-80th) Portsmouth
- Virginia State Del. Onzlee Ware (D-11th) Roanoke City and Roanoke County
- Virginia State Del. Joseph C. Lindsey (D-90th)
- Virginia State Del. Jennifer Carroll Foy (D-2nd)

== Staff ==
Position	Staff Member
Executive Director	Adele McClure
