= Lamont Bagby =

American politician (born 1976)

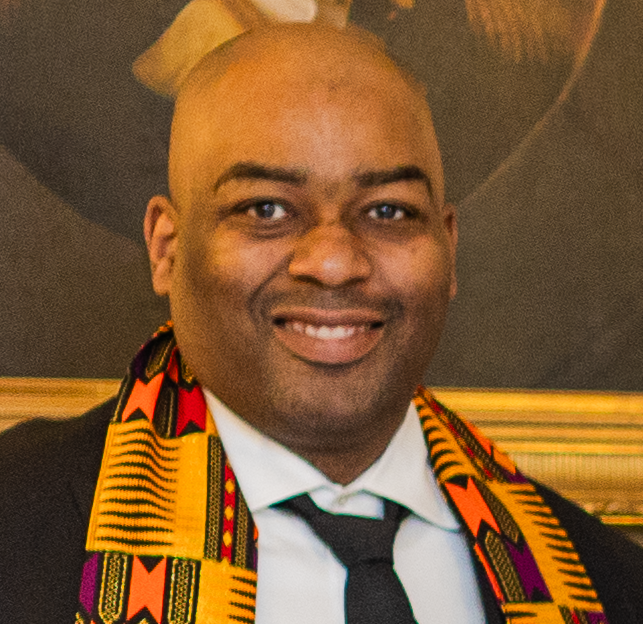

Chair of the Virginia Democratic Party
- Incumbent
- Assumed office March 22, 2025
- Preceded by: Susan Swecker

Member of the Virginia Senate
- Incumbent
- Assumed office April 11, 2023
- Preceded by: Jennifer McClellan
- Constituency: 9th district (2023–2024); 14th district (2024–present)

Member of the Virginia House of Delegates from the 74th district
- In office July 23, 2015 – April 11, 2023
- Preceded by: Joe Morrissey
- Succeeded by: Destiny Levere Bolling (redistricted)

Personal details
- Born: December 21, 1976 (age 49) Richmond, Virginia, U.S.
- Party: Democratic
- Children: 1
- Education: Norfolk State University (BS); Virginia Commonwealth University (MEd)
- Website: Official website

Lamont Bagby (born December 21, 1976) is an American politician of the Democratic Party. On November 3, 2015, he was elected to the Virginia House of Delegates, representing the 74th district, which includes Charles City County, parts of Henrico County and the city of Richmond. Bagby serves as the Chair of the Democratic Party of Virginia and Chair of the bicameral Virginia Legislative Black Caucus. He is a former member of the Henrico County School Board.

Bagby was the Democratic nominee in a special election to Virginia's 9th Senate district, which was vacated by Jennifer McClellan following her election to Congress. He won the election on March 28, 2023. He was sworn in on April 11, 2023. He has since been redistricted into the newly re-drawn 14th Senate district. District 14 is located in central Virginia, and contains parts of Henrico County and Richmond City.

== Political career ==
Lamont Bagby was a member of the Henrico County School Board (2008–2015), serving as chair in 2011. Bagby was then elected to the Virginia House of Delegates in a special election on July 21, 2015, and took the oath of office July 23, replacing Joe Morrissey, who resigned in April. He defeated David Lambert, son of longtime Virginia State Senator Benjamin Lambert. Bagby also defeated Lambert in the general election on November 3, 2015.

In 2014, Governor Terry McAuliffe appointed Bagby to the Norfolk State University Board of Visitors.

He is a member of the Senate Committees on Commerce and Labor, Courts of Justice, Education and Health, Local Government, and Transportation. Additionally, Senator Bagby serves on legislative studies and commissions including: the Joint Commission on Administrative Rules, Criminal Justice Services Board, Task Force to Assist in Identification of the History of Formerly Enslaved African Americans in Virginia, Health Insurance Reform Commission, Small Business Commission, Commission to Study the History of the Uprooting of Black Communities by Public Institutions of Higher Education in the Commonwealth, VCU Health System Board of Visitors, and Virginia Minority Business Commission.

== Other recognition ==
Bagby was named to the top 40 Extraordinary leaders under 40 list in Richmond alternative newspaper Style Weekly in 2009.

Currently, Bagby is the chairman of the Virginia Legislative Black Caucus, an organization dedicated to improving the economic, educational, political and social conditions of African Americans and other underrepresented groups in the Commonwealth of Virginia.

== Personal life ==
Senator Bagby is a graduate of Henrico High School. He earned a Bachelor of Science degree in Business Education from Norfolk State University as well as a master's degree in Education Leadership from Virginia Commonwealth University. He is a recipient of honorary doctorates from Norfolk State University and Virginia Union University.

Prior to his political career, Senator Bagby was a teacher and administrator at his alma mater, Henrico High School.

== Electoral history ==
Special election for Virginia House of Delegates, July 2015
Party	Candidate	Votes	%
Democratic	Lamont Bagby	2,192	84.5
Independent	David Lambert	398	15.34

General election for Virginia House of Delegates, Nov. 2015
Party	Candidate	Votes	%
Democratic	Lamont Bagby	11,452	77.9
Independent	David Lambert	3,107	21.13

General election for Virginia House of Delegates, Nov. 2017
Party	Candidate	Votes	%
Democratic	Lamont Bagby	20,041	76.0
Independent	Preston T. Brown	6,146	23.31

General election for Virginia House of Delegates, Nov. 2021
Party	Candidate	Votes	%
Democratic	Lamont Bagby	22,913	72.6
Republican	Jimmy Brooks	8,539	27.0

2023 Virginia Senate special election, District 9
Party	Candidate	Votes	%
Democratic	Lamont Bagby	13,552	89.84
Republican	Stephen J. Imholt	1,495	9.91
Write-In	Write In	37	0.25
Total votes		15,084	100
Democratic hold			

Party political offices
Preceded by Susan Swecker	Chair of the Virginia Democratic Party; 2025–present	Incumbent
