= Jean Wooden Cunningham =

American politician and lawyer

Member of the Virginia House of Delegates from the 71st district
- In office January 8, 1986 – January 14, 1998
- Preceded by: Benjamin Lambert
- Succeeded by: Viola Baskerville

Personal details
- Born: Jean Carolyn Wooden; June 28, 1946 (age 80) Hampton, Virginia, U.S.
- Party: Democratic
- Spouse: John Henry Cunningham
- Education: Virginia State University (B.A.); Howard University (J.D.)
- Occupation: lawyer

Jean Wooden Cunningham (born June 28, 1946) is an American politician and lawyer, and currently the vice-chairman of the Virginia Parole Board.

== Early life and education ==
Born in Hampton, Virginia, Cunningham graduated from Phenix High School, then received her bachelor's degree from Virginia State University. She then worked for a year as a junior high school teacher in Prince George County, Virginia. After accepting a job with International Business Machines, she moved to New York. She earned a J.D. degree from Howard University School of Law in Washington, D.C.

== Career ==
Cunningham began her legal career in the law department of the Ford Motor Company, specializing in labor law. After three years, she accepted a position with Reynolds Metals Company and moved to Richmond, Virginia. The company merged with Alcoa and she ultimately retired as vice president of human resources of the Integris Metals subsidiary.

A Democrat, Cunningham won a special election in 1985 for a seat in the Virginia House of Delegates, representing District 71 which included parts of Richmond and Henrico County. She succeeded Dr. Benjamin Lambert who was elected to the Virginia Senate. Cunningham won re-election many times before announcing her retirement from that part-time position in 1997. Viola Baskerville then won election to represent the 71st district.

After her retirement as a delegate and as a corporate attorney, Cunningham worked part-time as a mediator. She also served as Chair of the State Board of Elections and as a member of the State Council of Higher Education for Virginia before Governor Terry McAuliffe appointed her to the Virginia Parole Board in January 2017.

In addition to being active in her Baptist Church, Cunningham is or was also active in the National Coalition of 100 Black Women, Delta Sigma Theta, the James River Valley Chapter of The Links, Inc., Richmond Renaissance, Richmond Community Development Organization, Richmond Crusade for Voters, Virginia State Crime Commission, Virginia State Coordinating Council on Domestic Violence, as well with the Virginia Association of Black Women Attorneys, Old Dominion Bar Association and Metro Richmond Women's Bar Association. She has earned and Outstanding Legislator Award from the Virginia Interfaith Center, as well as the NAACP's Lifetime Achievement Award.
