= Donald McEachin =

American politician (1961–2022)

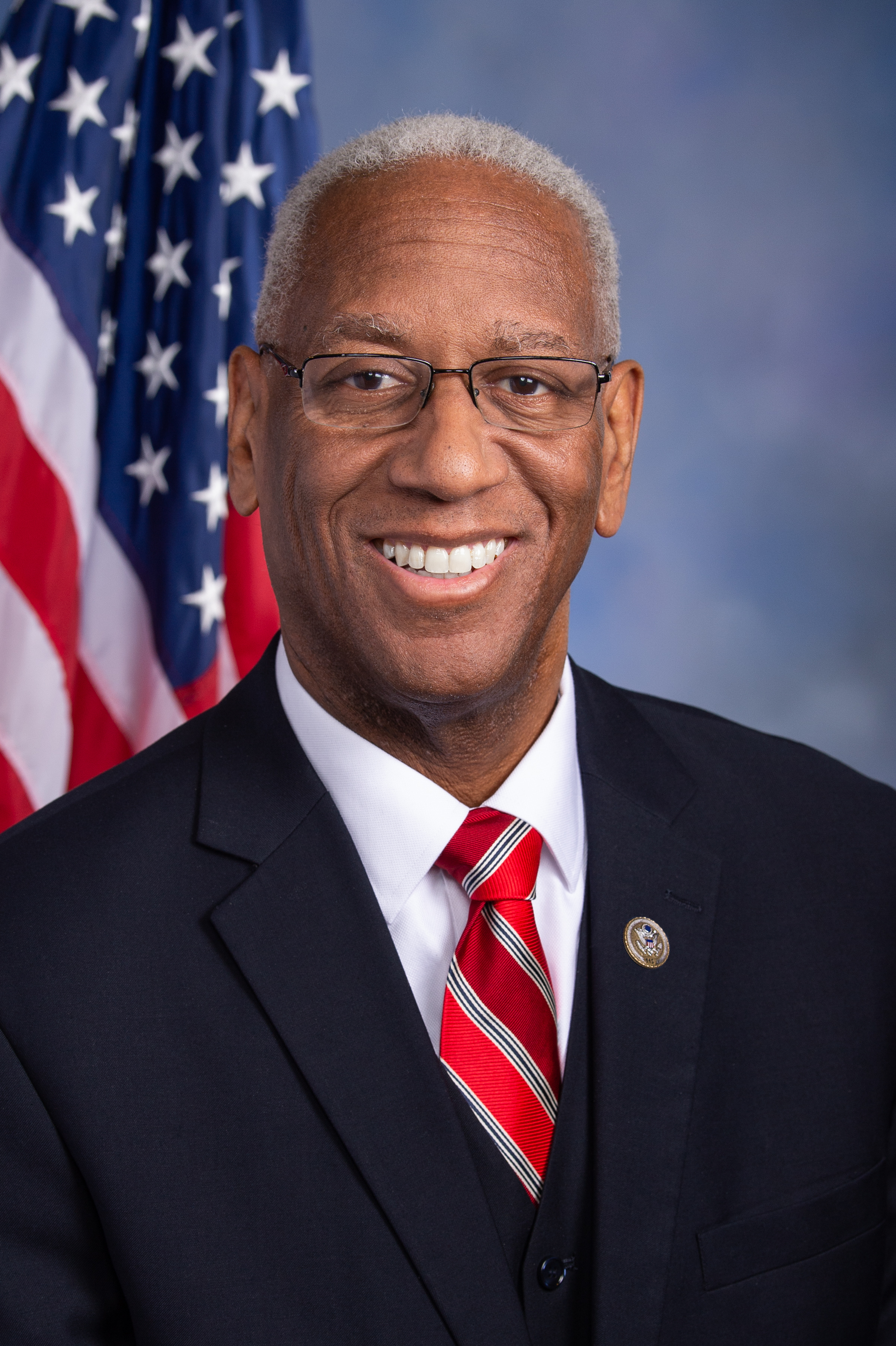

Member of the U.S. House of Representatives from Virginia's 4th district
- In office January 3, 2017 – November 28, 2022
- Preceded by: Randy Forbes
- Succeeded by: Jennifer McClellan

Member of the Virginia Senate from the 9th district
- In office January 9, 2008 – January 3, 2017
- Preceded by: Benjamin Lambert
- Succeeded by: Jennifer McClellan

Member of the Virginia House of Delegates from the 74th district
- In office January 11, 2006 – January 9, 2008
- Preceded by: Floyd Miles
- Succeeded by: Joe Morrissey
- In office January 10, 1996 – January 9, 2002
- Preceded by: Robert Ball
- Succeeded by: Floyd Miles

Personal details
- Born: Aston Donald McEachin; October 10, 1961 Nuremberg, Bavaria, West Germany (now Germany)
- Died: November 28, 2022 (aged 61) Richmond, Virginia, U.S.
- Resting place: Mount Calvary Cemetery in Richmond, Virginia
- Party: Democratic
- Spouse: Colette McEachin (m. 1986)
- Children: 3
- Education: American University (BA); University of Virginia (JD); Virginia Union University (MDiv)

Aston Donald McEachin (/məˈkiːtʃən/ mə-KEE-chən; October 10, 1961 – November 28, 2022) was an American politician and lawyer who served as the U.S. representative for Virginia's 4th congressional district from 2017 until his death in 2022. His district was based in the state capital, Richmond; it included much of the area between Richmond, a portion of its suburbs, and Hampton Roads.

A member of the Democratic Party, McEachin served in the Virginia House of Delegates from 1996 until 2002 and then served an additional term from 2006 until 2008. In 2001, he was the Democratic nominee in the Virginia Attorney General election, which he lost to Jerry Kilgore. McEachin subsequently served in the Senate of Virginia from 2008 until 2017, representing the 9th district, made up of Charles City County, plus parts of Henrico County and the city of Richmond. He was first elected to represent Virginia's 4th congressional district in 2016, filling an open seat vacated by Randy Forbes.

McEachin was the first African American nominated by a major party for Virginia Attorney General. He was the third African American elected to Congress from Virginia and the second elected from the state since the 19th century.

== Early life, education, and legal career ==
McEachin was born in Nuremberg, West Germany, while his father was serving in the United States Army. He attended St. Christopher's School in Richmond. In 1982, he received a bachelor's degree in political history from American University. After that, he attended the University of Virginia School of Law, where he received a J.D. in 1986. He also received a Master of Divinity from Virginia Union University in 2008. In 2012, he was awarded honoris causa membership in Omicron Delta Kappa, the National Leadership Honor Society.

McEachin began to practice law in Richmond after completing law school, eventually becoming a partner in his own firm, McEachin and Gee.

== Virginia Legislature ==
McEachin was first elected to the House of Delegates from the 74th district in 1995. After three terms there, he ran in the 2001 Virginia Attorney General election. He won a four-way Democratic primary with 33.6% of the vote, but lost the general election to Republican nominee Jerry Kilgore by 20 percentage points.

In 2005 he ran again for the 74th House district, defeating his predecessor, Floyd Miles, by 44 votes in the Democratic primary, and winning the general election with 75% of the vote.

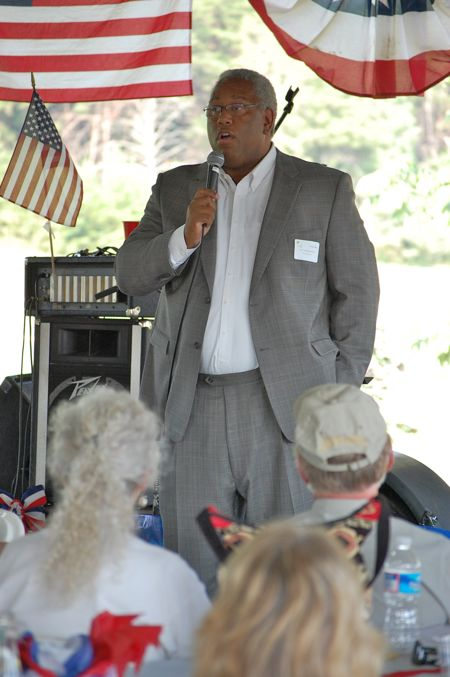
McEachin in 2010

In 2007, McEachin ran for the state senate, challenging 9th district incumbent Benjamin Lambert, who drew criticism within the Democratic Party for his endorsement of Republican U.S. Senator George Allen in Allen's unsuccessful 2006 reelection campaign against Jim Webb. After defeating Lambert 58%-42% in the primary, McEachin won 81% of the vote against independent Silver Persinger in the general election.

McEachin was unopposed for reelection in 2011.

== United States House of Representatives ==
Midway through his third term in the state senate, McEachin got an opportunity to transfer to federal politics. A federal court threw out Virginia's original congressional map as an unconstitutional racial gerrymander. A new map saw all of Petersburg and most of the majority-black precincts in Henrico County shifted from the 3rd district to the 4th district. The 4th also picked up all of Richmond, which had previously been split between the 3rd and 7th districts. The 4th had been represented by Republican Randy Forbes since a 2001 special election, but the addition of these majority-black areas turned the 4th from a Republican-leaning swing district into a heavily Democratic district. Rather than face certain defeat in the redrawn 4th, Forbes made an unsuccessful bid for the Republican nomination in the neighboring 2nd district. McEachin, whose then-home in unincorporated Henrico County lay just outside the redrawn 4th's boundaries, defeated Chesapeake City Councilwoman Ella Ward for the Democratic nomination. He then handily defeated Republican Henrico County Sheriff Mike Wade in the general election. He was reelected three times with no substantive opposition.

=== Committee assignments ===
McEachin was a member of the following committees and subcommittees during the 117th Congress:

- Committee on Energy and Commerce
  - Subcommittee on Communications and Technology
  - Subcommittee on Energy
  - Subcommittee on Environment and Climate Change
- Committee on Natural Resources
  - Energy and Mineral Resources
  - Oversight and Investigations
- Select Committee on the Climate Crisis

=== Caucus memberships ===
- New Democrat Coalition
- Congressional Black Caucus

== Political positions ==
McEachin voted with President Joe Biden's stated position 100% of the time in the 117th Congress, according to a FiveThirtyEight analysis.

== Electoral history ==
2016 Virginia's 4th congressional district election
Party	Candidate	Votes	%
Democratic	Donald McEachin	200,136	57.7
Republican	Mike Wade	145,731	42.0
Total votes		346,656	100.00

2018 Virginia's 4th congressional district election
Party	Candidate	Votes	%
Democratic	Donald McEachin (incumbent)	187,642	62.6
Republican	Ryan McAdams	107,706	35.9
Total votes		299,854	100.00

2020 Virginia's 4th congressional district election
Party	Candidate	Votes	%
Democratic	Donald McEachin (incumbent)	240,510	61.6
Republican	Leon Benjamin	149,481	38.3
Total votes		389,991	100.00

2022 Virginia's 4th congressional district election
Party	Candidate	Votes	%
Democratic	Donald McEachin (incumbent)	159,044	65.0
Republican	Leon Benjamin	85,503	35.0
Write-in		431	0.2
Total votes		245,046	100.00

== Illness and death ==
In 2018, McEachin revealed that he had developed a fistula after completing treatment for colorectal cancer in 2014, losing more than 60 pounds (27 kg) as a result. He advocated regular testing for colon cancer/colorectal cancer, telling attendees at a 2022 special screening of the film Black Panther: Wakanda Forever (a sequel to Black Panther, whose star, Chadwick Boseman, died of colon cancer), "Don't fool around. Don't go through my journey", two weeks before his death.

McEachin died at his home in Richmond of complications of cancer on November 28, 2022, at the age of 61. His death came a few weeks after his reelection to a fourth term in the 2022 elections. Tributes to McEachin were paid by outgoing Speaker of the House Nancy Pelosi, as well as fellow Virginia Democratic representative Gerry Connolly and both of Virginia's U.S. Senators, Mark Warner and Tim Kaine (who had known McEachin since 1984). McEachin was succeeded by Jennifer McClellan, a fellow Democrat who held McEachin's former state senate seat, in a special election on February 21, 2023.

McEachin is buried in the Mount Calvary Cemetery in Richmond, Virginia.

== Personal life ==
McEachin and his wife, Colette, had three children and lived in Richmond. In 2019, Colette McEachin became interim Commonwealth's Attorney for Richmond (having served in that office for 20 years), won the Democratic nomination on August 10, and was unopposed in the special election on November 5.

On August 25, 2015, McEachin's name was found on the userlist leaked from the data breach of the Ashley Madison website. His response was, "At this time, this is a personal issue between my family and me. I will have no further statement on this issue."

McEachin was a Baptist.

== See also ==
- List of African-American United States representatives
- List of members of the United States Congress who died in office (2000–present)#2020s

Virginia House of Delegates
Preceded by Robert Ball	Member of the Virginia House of Delegates from the 74th district 1996–2002	Succeeded by Floyd Miles
Preceded by Floyd Miles	Member of the Virginia House of Delegates from the 74th district 2006–2008	Succeeded by Joseph D. Morrissey
Senate of Virginia
Preceded by Benjamin Lambert	Member of the Virginia Senate from the 9th district 2008–2017	Succeeded by Jennifer McClellan
U.S. House of Representatives
Preceded by Randy Forbes	Member of the U.S. House of Representatives from Virginia's 4th congressional district 2017–2022	Succeeded by Jennifer McClellan
