= Joe Morrissey =

American lawyer and politician (born 1957)

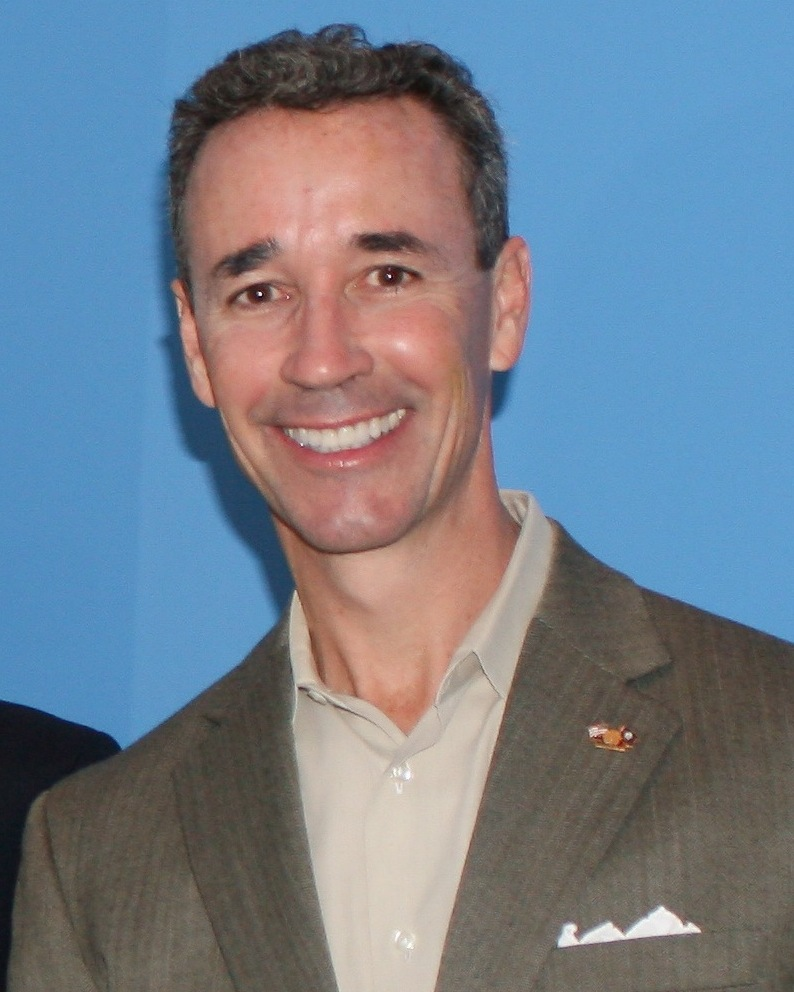
- Morrissey in 2010

Member of the Virginia Senate from the 16th district
- In office January 8, 2020 – January 10, 2024
- Preceded by: Rosalyn Dance
- Succeeded by: Lashrecse Aird (Redistricting)

Member of the Virginia House of Delegates from the 74th district
- In office January 13, 2015 – March 25, 2015
- Preceded by: Himself
- Succeeded by: Lamont Bagby
- In office January 9, 2008 – December 18, 2014
- Preceded by: Donald McEachin
- Succeeded by: Himself

Commonwealth's Attorney for Richmond
- In office January 1, 1990 – December 31, 1993
- Preceded by: Aubrey M. Davis Jr.
- Succeeded by: David M. Hicks

Personal details
- Born: Joseph Dee Morrissey; September 23, 1957 (age 69) Washington, D.C., U.S.
- Party: Democratic (Before 2014, 2015–2016, 2019–present)
- Other political affiliations: Independent (2014–2015, 2016–2019); Republican (1981)
- Spouse: Myrna Pride (m. 2016; div. 2023)
- Children: 8
- Education: University of Virginia (BA); Georgetown University (JD); Trinity College, Dublin (LLM)

Joseph Dee Morrissey (born September 23, 1957) is an American politician, businessman, and former lawyer who won election to both chambers of the Virginia General Assembly from districts including Richmond or surrounding Henrico County, Virginia under various political affiliations. He represented Virginia's 16th Senate district from 2020 to 2024, having been elected during the 2019 election. He represented much of southern Richmond, as well as all of the cities of Petersburg and Hopewell and portions of Chesterfield, Dinwiddie and Prince George counties. He lost the 2023 Democratic primary for his district.

He served as Commonwealth's Attorney of Richmond 1989–93 and was first elected to the Virginia House of Delegates in November 2007. Re-elected several times, on December 18, 2014, he resigned after admitting to having sex with a minor, but won back his own seat as an independent upon release from prison, then resigned again on March 25, 2015. He represented the 74th House district, made up of Charles City County and parts of Henrico and Prince George counties, all of the city of Hopewell and part of the city of Richmond.

Morrissey won an election to Petersburg City Council in November 2026.

== Early life and education ==
The son of cardiologist William F. Morrissey and his wife Jean, Morrissey claims descent from John "Old Smoke" Morrissey, a 19th-century U.S. Congressman and one-time bare-knuckle boxer. He and his five siblings grew up in Annandale, where he attended parochial schools.

Morrissey received a B.A. in economics at the University of Virginia in 1979, and a J.D. from the Georgetown University Law Center in 1982. He earned a master of laws degree with honors at Trinity College, Dublin in 2003.

== Early teaching and legal career ==
Morrissey taught government as a high school teacher, and after admission to the Virginia bar, served as Commonwealth's Attorney of Richmond, Virginia 1989–93. He had a private legal practice from 1993 to 2000. He was a lecturer of law at Portobello College in Ireland from 2001 to 2002, and taught in the law school at the Dublin Institute of Technology for two years (2001–03) and in Australia at the University of Adelaide and the University of Western Sydney in 2003 until he was fired for failing to disclose the fact he had been disbarred.

The New South Wales Bar Association on April 26, 2006, found Morrissey was "not a fit and proper person to be admitted as a legal practitioner".

=== Reprimand, suspensions and first law license revocation ===
As an attorney, Morrissey was cited for contempt of court ten times and was jailed or arrested five times. He was indicted and acquitted of five bribery, perjury, and misuse of public funds charges as commonwealth's attorney, and was suspended and reinstated to the post a number of times. Records from the Virginia State Bar indicate that Morrissey received a public reprimand in March 1992, and had his law license suspended twice: once in December 1993 and then again in December 1999.

On December 21, 2001, Morrissey was disbarred in the U.S. District Court for the Eastern District of Virginia, and on April 25, 2003, his license to practice law was revoked by the Virginia State Bar Disciplinary Board. He appealed the federal disbarment to the U.S. Court of Appeals for the Fourth Circuit. However, the disbarment was affirmed in a September 2002 opinion which concluded "Frequent episodes of unethical, contumacious, or otherwise inappropriate conduct mar Joseph D. Morrissey's career as prosecutor and private defense attorney." The appellate court said, "Evidence … demonstrates Morrissey's 15-year history of contempt citations, reprimands, fines, suspensions, and even incarcerations arising from unprofessional conduct mostly involving an uncontrollable temper, inappropriate responses to stress, and dishonesty."

On December 16, 2011, the Supreme Court of Virginia approved his petition for reinstatement to the bar. However, that decision did not bind the federal courts, and he was disbarred again in 2018.

=== Second law license revocation ===
In March 2018, the Virginia State Bar brought new charges of misconduct against Morrissey. A three-judge panel convened on March 26, 2018, to hear three separate allegations of misconduct. First, the Bar contended that Morrissey's criminal conviction and improper contact with his 17-year-old intern violated rules regarding criminal conduct by an attorney, and that Morrissey had destroyed evidence relating to the criminal case against him. On March 28, the panel found that though the Bar had not shown that Morrissey destroyed evidence, they did find that the Bar had successfully demonstrated that Morrissey's relationship with his intern was "a criminal or deliberately wrongful act that reflects adversely on the lawyer's honesty, trustworthiness, or fitness to practice law."

On March 29, the panel considered charges stemming from Morrissey's representation of former Virginia governor Douglas Wilder and the United States National Slavery Museum in a tax matter. Despite being subpoenaed, Wilder failed to appear, and so the disciplinary panel found insufficient evidence as to these charges. Wilder would later contest this decision, arguing that service of the subpoena had been improper.

Finally, on March 30, the panel found that Morrissey had also violated legal ethics rules when he allowed another member of his firm (not yet sworn in as a lawyer) to appear in court on behalf of one of the firm's clients. That employee had passed the Bar Examination a short time before, but until formal swearing-in by the Virginia Supreme Court was ineligible to represent clients as an attorney. Morrissey was thus found to have violated rules that require a lawyer to ensure that anyone under his or her supervision also follow ethics rules. The panel also noted that Morrissey had not informed his client that someone else would be present, itself a violation of the Bar's rules.

Based on the violations that it found Morrissey had committed and considering his prior disciplinary and legal difficulties, the panel ordered that Morrissey's law license be revoked effective June 15, 2018.

Morrissey applied to the Virginia Supreme Court on June 13, 2018, for a stay of his revocation as he perfected an appeal to the Richmond Circuit Court's ruling. In a three-paragraph order, the Virginia Supreme Court denied the stay on June 14, 2018. Morrissey's law license was revoked for the second time on June 15, 2018. Morrissey's appeal of the revocation was denied by the Virginia Supreme Court on July 18, 2019.

On January 9, 2020, the Virginia Supreme Court adopted a rules change eliminating the legal ambiguity cited in Morrissey's last disbarment appeal. Also on that day, the federal U.S. District Court for the Eastern District of Virginia dismissed Morrissey's libel lawsuit against WTVR-TV, a local television station.

== Political career ==
=== Virginia House of Delegates ===
Morrissey first ran for the Virginia House of Delegates in 1981, during the summer before his third year of law school, hoping to gain one of three seats in the newly-drawn 51st district, based in Fairfax County. Positioning himself as an opponent of the Equal Rights Amendment and abortion, he entered the Republican Party primary after consulting with his former government professor, Larry Sabato. He placed fifth in a field of seven candidates, finishing behind incumbent delegates Robert E. Harris, Jim Dillard, and Larry Pratt, as well as former delegate Robert L. Thoburn.

Morrissey first won election to the House representing a Richmond-area district in November 2007 as a Democrat. He won re-election to that part time position several times, but resigned that position due to legal troubles discussed below. Though he won the seat back in a special election, he resigned permanently when lawmakers realized he was running for a Virginia Senate seat outside his district (and was forced to drop that campaign as well).

Morrissey attracted national attention in January 2013, when during a debate on gun control he pulled an unloaded AK-47 from under his desk and brandished it on the floor of the House of Delegates, after a Republican-controlled subcommittee had killed a bill of his that would have tightened gun controls in the commonwealth on weapons such as AK-47s. He announced, "A lot of people don't know that in many locations in the commonwealth, you can take this gun, you can walk in the middle of Main Street loaded and not be in violation of the law."

On March 24, 2015, Morrissey was disqualified from the House of Delegates after filing to run for a state Senate seat outside of his district. He dropped out of that senate race in September 2015, allowing incumbent Rosalyn Dance (D) to win reelection without active opposition.

=== Unsuccessful mayoral candidacy ===
In 2016, Morrissey ran for mayor of Richmond as an independent. Morrissey finished in third place behind Democratic opponents Levar Stoney and Jack Berry, securing 21% of the vote.

=== Virginia State Senate (2020–2024) ===
In 2019, he again ran for Dance's seat in the Virginia Senate, and this time defeated her in the Democratic primary, earning 56% of the vote. He defeated independent candidate Waylin Ross in the general election held in November 2019. In 2019, Morrissey was elected to a seat on the Senate of Virginia, representing the 16th district.

==== 2019 general election ====
In November 2020, Morrissey was charged with three misdemeanor counts of violating state election laws; the charges related to the 2019 elections, in which Morrissey was alleged to have entered a polling place in Virginia, given food to poll workers and voters, thanking them for supporting him, and inviting them to an election party thrown by his campaign. Morrissey's office said the charges were politically motivated, following Morrissey endorsing Virginia Delegate Jay Jones for Virginia Attorney General, a challenger to incumbent Mark Herring.

On January 8, 2021, a judge dismissed all charges against Morrissey. The dismissal occurred after Morrissey's attorneys brought forth affidavits from six poll workers defending Morrissey's actions on Election Day and stating that he greeted them politely, and behaved in a "totally appropriate manner when he offered them donuts for their hard work."

==== 2023 primary election ====
Morrissey lost the 2023 Democratic primary to Virginia Delegate Lashrecse Aird by a 40% margin.

=== Unsuccessful congressional candidacy ===
In December 2022, Morrissey ran to be the Democratic candidate in a special election for Virginia's 4th congressional district, triggered by the death of US representative Donald McEachin. He lost to state senator Jennifer McClellan in a firehouse primary.

=== Petersburg City Council candidacy ===
Although Morrissey stated that he was done with politics in 2023, he announced that he was running for Petersburg City Council's 5th Ward in 2026.

Morrissey was successful against 16-year incumbent Howard Myers on November 3rd, 2026.

== Personal life ==
Morrissey married Myrna Pride in Varina, Virginia, on June 11, 2016, when she was 20 years old and Morissey was 59. Morrissey initially denied paternity of his son with Pride, who was born in March 2015 when Pride was 19. On May 20, 2015, he confirmed paternity of the boy. Although Morrissey admitted having sexual relationships with Pride in a plea agreement following a conviction for contributing to the delinquency of a minor, maintained that no sexual activity occurred before she was of legal age. In 2023, Pride filed for divorce claiming that Morrissey had numerous affairs. She also reversed her previous statements, saying that Morrissey did engage in sexual relations with her while she was still a minor.

Morrissey has three children with Pride, a son born circa 2015, a daughter, Bella, born circa 2016, and a son, Maverick, born circa 2018. Morrissey also has five additional children with four other women.

Raised as a Catholic, Morrissey attended New Kingdom Christian Ministry in Henrico County, a Baptist church, in 2015. In 2023, he again described himself as Catholic.

=== Conviction for delinquency of a minor ===
In August 2013, police found Morrissey in his Henrico County home with a 17-year-old girl, later his wife, who was at the time an employee of his law office. Morrissey, the girl, and her mother denied any impropriety. A Henrico County court convened a grand jury to investigate a possible improper sexual relationship between Morrissey and the girl. On June 30, 2014, Morrissey was indicted on felony charges of indecent liberties with a minor, possession and distribution of child pornography, and electronic solicitation of a minor, in addition to a misdemeanor charge of contributing to the delinquency of a minor, for which conviction he served three months of a 12-month sentence. After being convicted, Morrissey resigned as a delegate at the Virginia House.

According to statements from the prosecutor in court documents, Morrissey had sex with the girl multiple times in his law office in August 2013, and possessed a nude photograph of the girl, which he also sent to a friend. Morrissey allegedly continued the relationship with the girl after she left his law office in August 2013, and the two allegedly shared a hotel room overnight in October 2013.

Morrissey denied the charges, saying the girl came to him for advice about family problems and was being abused by her father, and that the special prosecutor was out to get him because of a personal vendetta. Morrissey said he rejected a plea bargain for a single misdemeanor in December 2013. He vowed to fight the charges in court, declaring that he would be vindicated, and rejected calls to resign his House seat.

Morrissey again made national headlines in July 2014 when he used an obscenity on live television while reading a text message he claimed was planted on his phone by hackers. He entered into a plea agreement in which he made an Alford plea to one misdemeanor charge and received an active jail sentence. News reports indicated that Morrissey would be eligible to attend sessions of the legislature on work release.

Leading members of the Virginia Democratic Party, including Governor Terry McAuliffe, called for Morrissey to resign his seat. Morrissey resigned his seat on December 18, 2014, but ran in the special election to fill the resulting vacancy. On January 13, 2015, while serving a six-month jail sentence and running as an independent, he won that election to reclaim his seat in the Virginia House of Delegates.

William Neely, the special prosecutor appointed to investigate the Morrissey case, secured new felony indictments January 21, 2015, against Morrissey for perjury and for presenting forged documents during his sentencing hearing.

On January 15, 2022, in his last day in office, Governor Ralph Northam pardoned Morrissey for the misdemeanor conviction.

Virginia House of Delegates
Preceded by Donald McEachin	Member of the Virginia House of Delegates from the 74th district 2008–2014	Succeeded by Himself
Preceded by Himself	Member of the Virginia House of Delegates from the 74th district 2015–2015	Succeeded by Lamont Bagby
Senate of Virginia
Preceded by Rosalyn Dance	Member of the Virginia Senate from the 16th district 2020–2024	Succeeded by Schuyler VanValkenburg
