= Benjamin Lambert =

American politician (1937–2014)

Member of the Virginia Senate from the 9th district
- In office January 8, 1986 – January 9, 2008
- Preceded by: Douglas Wilder
- Succeeded by: Donald McEachin

Member of the Virginia House of Delegates
- In office January 11, 1978 – January 8, 1986
- Preceded by: Richard S. Reynolds III
- Succeeded by: Jean W. Cunningham
- Constituency: 33rd district (1978‍–‍1983); 71st district (1983‍–‍1986)

Personal details
- Born: Benjamin Joseph Lambert III; January 29, 1937 Richmond, Virginia, U.S.
- Died: March 2, 2014 (aged 77) Richmond, Virginia, U.S.
- Party: Democratic
- Spouse: Carolyn Lee Morris
- Education: Virginia Union University; New England College of Optometry
- Occupation: Optometrist; politician

Benjamin Joseph Lambert III (January 29, 1937 – March 2, 2014) was an American optometrist, community leader and politician. A Democrat, Lambert served for more than three decades in both houses of the Virginia General Assembly (the first optometrist ever to serve in that body), initially in the Virginia House of Delegates and then in the Senate.

== Early life and education ==
Lambert was born in Richmond, Virginia on January 29, 1937. He attended racially segregated public schools in Henrico County, Virginia, including Sandston Elementary. During the "massive resistance" crisis, he attended Virginia Randolph Community High School in Glen Allen and graduated from that segregated institution as its most outstanding student in 1955. He then began studying mathematics at Virginia Union University and after graduating with honors, went on to earn a graduate degree from the Massachusetts College of Optometry (which later became the New England College of Optometry).

He married the former Carolyn Lee Morris and they would have children Benjamin Lambert IV, David M. Lambert, Charles J. Lambert and Ann F. Lambert.

== Career ==
Lambert began practicing optometry in Richmond's Jackson Ward in 1962, and ten years later the Richmond Jaycees named him their Most Outstanding Young Man in Richmond. He was active not only in his St. Paul's Baptist Church and college alumni association (where he later served as secretary of the board of trustees), but also the Omega Psi Phi fraternity, the Salvation Army Boys Club and the North Richmond YMCA. As an African-American, Lambert was also active in the NAACP, the Richmond Crusade for Voters and the Jackson Ward Civic Association. Lambert also served on various boards of directors, including of the Sheltering Arms Hospital and the Central Virginia Health System Agency (treasurer) and later Virginia Commonwealth University's Health Systems Authority Board, Dominion Resources (from 1994 until his death), Consolidated Bank & Trust Company, Student Loan Marketing Agency (Sallie Mae), USA Education Inc. and Benedictine College Preparatory and other schools. Lambert became known for his efforts to make Richmond more inclusive. He was also named the Virginia Optometrist of the Year (1980), and received the National Conference of Christians and Jews' Humanitarian Award (1993).

== Political career ==
In 1977, Richmond voters elected Lambert as one of the six members representing the 33rd district in the House of Delegates. He began serving in the part-time position in 1978, and was re-elected several times, although the district boundaries changed after the 1980 census to include east-central Henrico county and part of Charles City County and the new single-member district was renumbered the 71st. He served alongside George E. Allen Jr., Walter H. Emroch, Franklin P. Hall and James S. Christian Jr., all fellow Democrats. Lambert also helped expand the scope of services that fellow optometrists could provide, and worked to limit deleterious professional effects of retail interests. His wife Carolyn also assisted in various legislative committees.

In 1985, voters from parts of Richmond and all of Charles City County elected Lambert to the Virginia Senate in a special election, where he succeeded Douglas Wilder, who had become Lieutenant Governor of Virginia and represented the 9th Senate District. He was re-elected several times and rose in seniority for decades. Fellow democrat and lawyer Jean Wooden Cunningham succeeded him as the District 71 delegate in the session which began January 8, 1986, and would win re-election many times. Lambert was the first African-American in the 20th Century to serve on the Virginia Senate Finance Committee. During his senate tenure, Lambert served on a number of other committees as well, including Education and Health, General Laws, Privileges and Elections, General Government, and Health and Human Resources. Additionally, he chaired the Subcommittees on Higher Education and General Government, the Brown v. Board Scholarship Commission (assisting students who would have attended schools closed to prevent desegregation during Massive Resistance), and the Lead Abatement Subcommittee. He became known for his efforts to bridge party lines, and on behalf of education.

In 2006, Lambert endorsed Republican U.S. Senator George Allen's unsuccessful reelection bid. The following year, Senator Lambert was defeated for re-election by former Delegate Donald A. McEachin, who made the Allen endorsement a key factor in the contest.

== Death and legacy ==
Following a period of failing health, Lambert died, aged 77, on March 2, 2014, in a Richmond hospital. He was survived by his widow, four community minded children (including Benjamin Lambert IV who continues the family's political involvement), and several grandchildren.

The Library of Virginia honored him as one of the African American trailblazers in its "Strong Men and Women" series in 2017. The L. Douglas Wilder Library and Learning Resource Center at Virginia Union University holds Lambert's correspondence as Senator from 1991-2000.

In 2018 a street in Jackson Ward was renamed in his honor.

Virginia House of Delegates
Preceded by Richard S. Reynolds III	Virginia House of Delegates, District 33; 1978-1982	Succeeded by Robert T. Andrews
Preceded by None (district created)	Virginia House of Delegates, District 71; 1982-1986	Succeeded by Jean W. Cunningham
Senate of Virginia
Preceded by Douglas Wilder	Virginia Senate, District 9; 1986–2008	Succeeded by Donald McEachin
