= Style Weekly =

Online alternative media outlet

- Type: Online local alternative
- Owner: VPM Media Corporation
- Editor-in-chief: Brent Baldwin
- Founded: November 1982
- Ceased publication: September 7, 2021
- Relaunched: December 14, 2021
- Language: English
- Headquarters: Richmond, Virginia
- Country: United States

Style Weekly is an online alternative media outlet that was previously an alternative weekly newspaper started in November 1982 for news, arts, culture and opinion in Richmond, Virginia.

== History ==
Style was launched by Lorna Wyckoff on her kitchen table as a monthly guide to Richmond’s West End. She sold it in 1984 in order to go weekly to Landmark Media Enterprises and stayed on as Publisher/Editor for the next 10 years. In 2018, it was sold to Tribune Publishing along with two other publications for $34 million. In that same year, Style Weekly was named as the recipient of the Virginia Press Association's award for journalistic integrity and community service.

On May 21, 2021, Tribune Publishing was purchased by hedge fund Alden Global Capital in a $633 million deal.

On September 7, 2021, Style Weekly's editor-in-chief announced on Facebook they would be ceasing publication the following day.

On November 17, 2021, VPM Media Corporation, the parent company of public media group VPM, announced it had acquired Style Weekly.

On December 14, 2021, Style Weekly's editor-in-chief announced that Style would resume publishing online as it evaluates the future of the print publication.
