= Virginia's 74th House of Delegates district =

Virginia legislative district

Leadership
- Mike Cherry, Republican

Structure
- Seats: 1
- Length of term: 2 years
- Authority: The Virginia Public Access Project

District map from the 2023 election

Virginia's 74th House of Delegates district elects one of the 100 members of the Virginia House of Delegates. District 74 includes the city of Colonial Heights and part of Chesterfield County.

The seat has been held by Republican Mike Cherry since 2023.

== District officeholders ==
Years	Delegate	Party	Electoral history
January 12, 1983 – January 10, 1996	Robert Ball	Democratic	
January 10, 1996 – January 9, 2002	Donald McEachin	Democratic	Ran for Attorney General
January 9, 2002 – January 11, 2006	Floyd Miles	Democratic	
January 11, 2006 – January 9, 2008	Donald McEachin	Democratic	Declined to seek reelection; Elected to the state senate
January 9, 2008 – March 25, 2015	Joe Morrissey	Democratic	Resigned on December 18, 2014, after a conviction for a sex crime; Ran in the special election to fill his seat and was in office again from January 13, 2015, to March 25, 2015; Resigned from the House of Delegates on March 25, 2015, to run for a state senate seat outside of his district
July 23, 2015 – April 11, 2023	Lamont Bagby	Democratic	Elected to the state senate
2023 – present	Mike Cherry	Republican	
