= Virginia's 71st House of Delegates district =

Virginia legislative district

- District map following the 2021 redistricting
- Delegate: Jessica Anderson

Virginia's 71st House of Delegates district elects one of the 100 members of the Virginia House of Delegates, which is the lower house of the state's bicameral legislature. The 71st district is composed of the City of Williamsburg and parts of the counties of James City and New Kent.

Currently, the 71st district is represented by Democrat Jessica Anderson, who defeated incumbent Republican Amanda Batten in 2025.

Following the 2021 Virginia redistricting, the district was formed from parts of the 93rd, 96th, and 97th Virginia House of Delegates districts.

== District officeholders ==
Years	Delegate	Party	Electoral history
January 12, 1983 – January 8, 1986	Benjamin Lambert	Democratic	Declined to seek reelection; Elected to the Senate of Virginia
January 8, 1986 – January 14, 1998	Jean Wooden Cunningham	Democratic	Retired
January 14, 1998 – May 2005	Viola Baskerville	Democratic	Declined to seek reelection; Unsuccessfully ran in the Democratic Primary for Lieutenant Governor of Virginia; Appointed Virginia Secretary of Administration
January 11, 2006 – January 13, 2017	Jennifer McClellan	Democratic	Declined to seek reelection; Elected to the Senate of Virginia
February 8, 2017 – January 10, 2024	Jeff Bourne	Democratic	Elected via special election
January 10, 2024 – January 14, 2026	Amanda Batten	Republican	Relocated after redistricting
January 14, 2026 – present	Jessica Anderson	Democratic	Elected in the 2025 Virginia House of Delegates election
