= Levar Stoney =

American politician (born 1981)

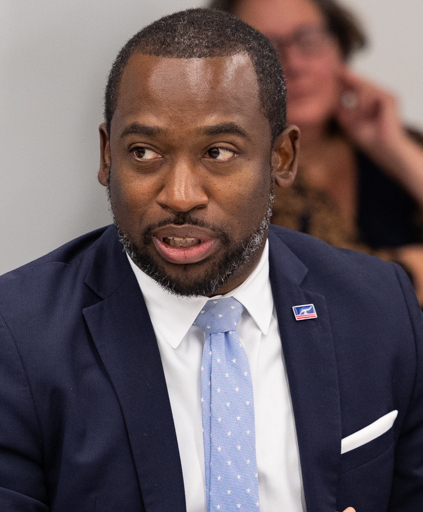
- Stoney in 2022

80th Mayor of Richmond
- In office January 1, 2017 – January 1, 2025
- Preceded by: Dwight Jones
- Succeeded by: Danny Avula

Secretary of the Commonwealth of Virginia
- In office January 17, 2014 – April 15, 2016
- Governor: Terry McAuliffe
- Preceded by: Janet Vestal Kelly
- Succeeded by: Kelly Thomasson

Personal details
- Born: Levar Marcus Stoney; March 20, 1981 (age 45) Roosevelt, New York, U.S.
- Party: Democratic
- Spouse(s): Kristina Perry (m. 2012; div. 2016) Brandy Washington (m. 2023)
- Children: 1
- Education: James Madison University (BA)
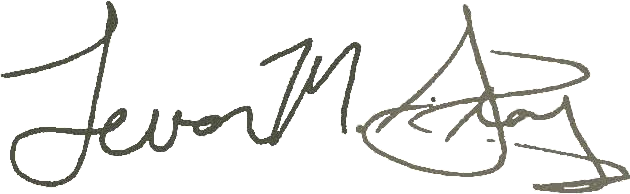
- Signature

Levar Marcus Stoney (born March 20, 1981) is an American politician who served as the 80th mayor of Richmond, Virginia, from 2017 to 2025. A member of the Democratic Party, he previously served as the Secretary of the Commonwealth of Virginia from 2014 through 2016, being the youngest member of Governor Terry McAuliffe's administration.

Stoney was a candidate for lieutenant governor of Virginia in the 2025 elections, but he narrowly lost the nomination to fellow Democrat Ghazala Hashmi.

== Early and personal life ==
Stoney was born in Roosevelt, New York on Long Island. When he was seven years old, he moved with his younger brother to Virginia's Hampton Roads area. His parents never married; Stoney and his siblings were raised by their father (who supported the family via various low-wage jobs, and eventually became a high school janitor) and grandmother (a retired domestic worker).

At Tabb High School in Tabb, Virginia, Stoney became quarterback on the school's football team, and also president of the student body (as he had in elementary and middle school). Stoney graduated from James Madison University in Harrisonburg, Virginia, in 2004. He was the first African-American male elected president of the student government, and involved with the school's chapter of the College Democrats.

In 2016, Stoney divorced his wife of four years. He became engaged to Brandy Washington, a manager for Altria on February 22, 2022. They married almost exactly a year later, on February 23, 2023. Their daughter Sunday Washington Stoney was born in March 2024.

== Career ==
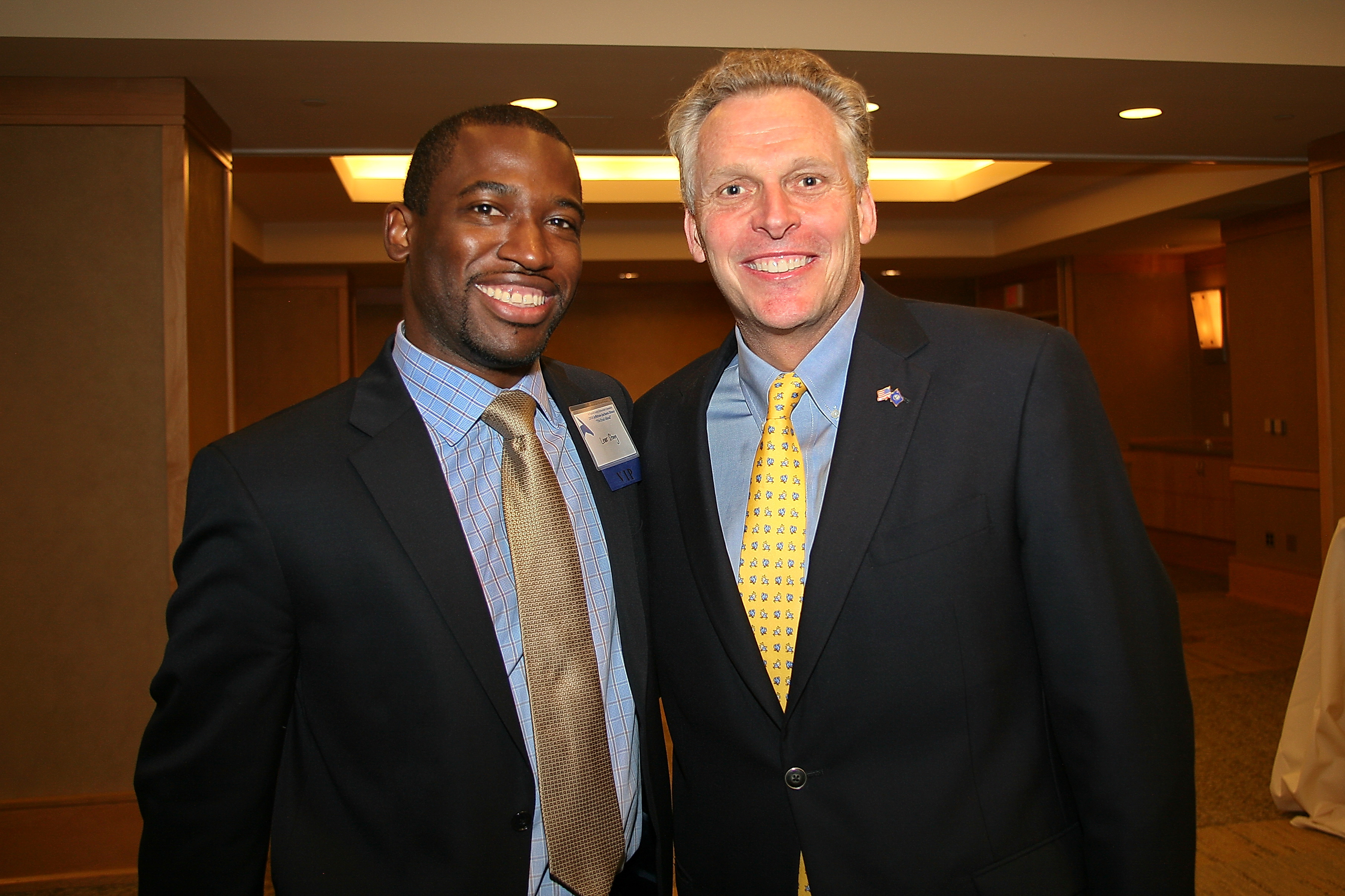
Stoney (left) with Terry McAuliffe in 2010

In the summer of 2004, Stoney served as a Governor's Fellow in Mark Warner's administration. Stoney then worked as an organizer in John Kerry's 2004 presidential campaign as well as for the Democratic National Committee and the Democratic Party of Wisconsin in a get out the vote effort. Five colleagues were charged with vandalizing a van intended for transporting Republican voters. He initially denied knowledge of the incident but later acknowledged to the FBI that he was in the office when his colleagues bragged about the act. He went on to fully cooperate with law enforcement and testified against those involved. Following questioning by Virginia Republican lawmakers during a 2014 confirmation hearing, it was accepted as "an isolated, youthful mistake."

During the 2005 Virginia Attorney General election Stoney worked for Creigh Deeds, who narrowly lost. Stoney then worked for the Democratic Party of Virginia from 2006 to 2009, first as political director and then executive director. In this role, he worked extensively with President Barack Obama's successful 2008 presidential campaign.

In 2011, after his father died, Stoney began working as a consultant at Green Tech, an automotive company run by Terry McAuliffe (who had lost to Deeds in the 2009 Democratic gubernatorial primary). The following year Stoney began working with McAuliffe's 2013 gubernatorial campaign, as deputy campaign manager, under campaign manager Robby Mook. When McAuliffe won, Stoney became deputy director of the gubernatorial transition team, during which McAuliffe described Stoney as his "closest adviser."

== Secretary of the Commonwealth ==
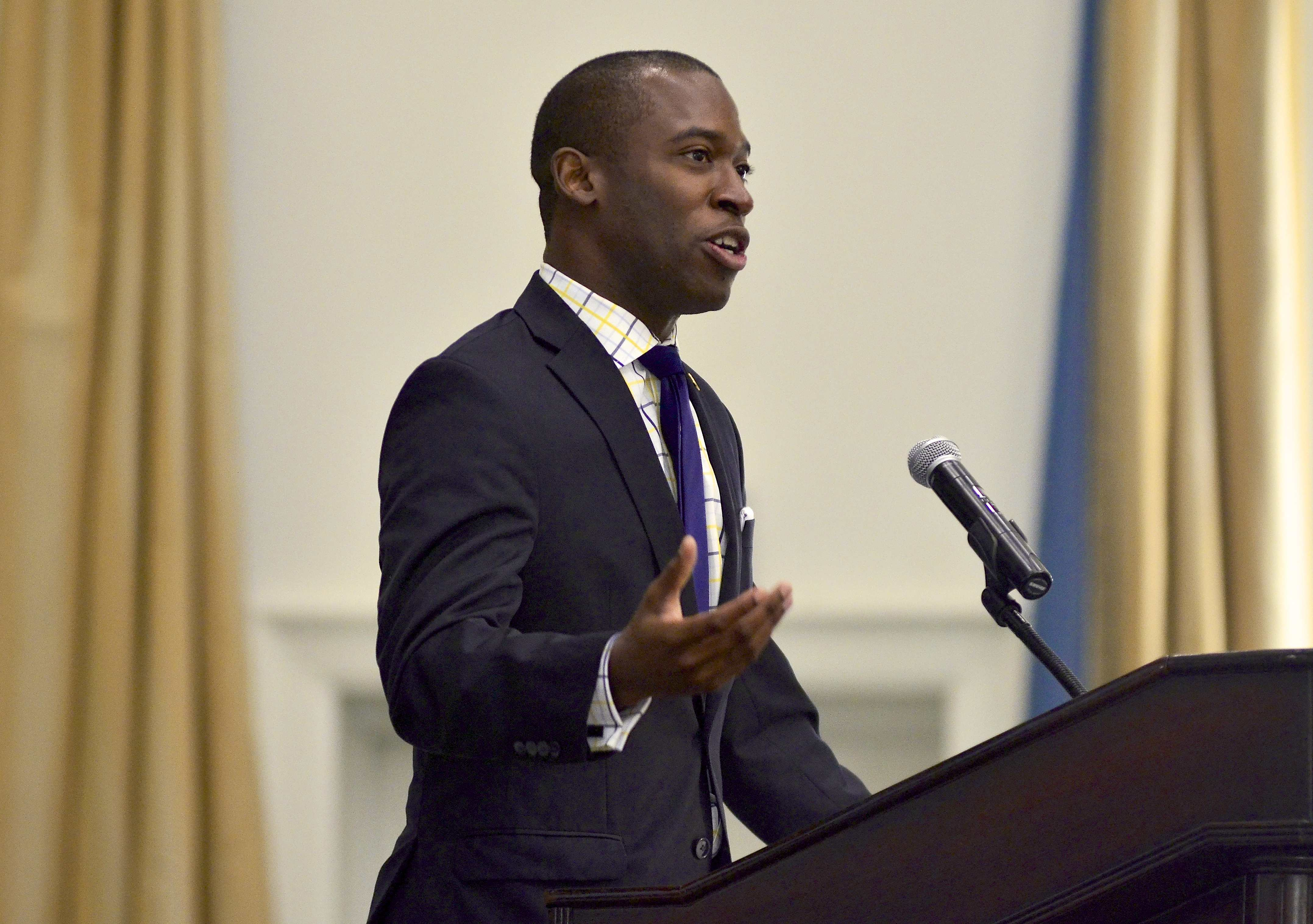
Stoney in 2015

McAuliffe appointed Stoney as Secretary of the Commonwealth of Virginia on November 18, 2013. Following confirmation by the Virginia General Assembly, he took office on January 17, 2014.

As Secretary of the Commonwealth, Stoney championed efforts for the restoration of voting rights for felons who have completed their sentences, an effort begun under Governor Bob McDonnell and accelerated under Governor McAuliffe. Stoney said that "once you have served your time and paid your due, we still should not be punishing you years afterwards. Instead, we should find ways to give that individual an opportunity to better themselves and to contribute to society."

== Mayor of Richmond ==
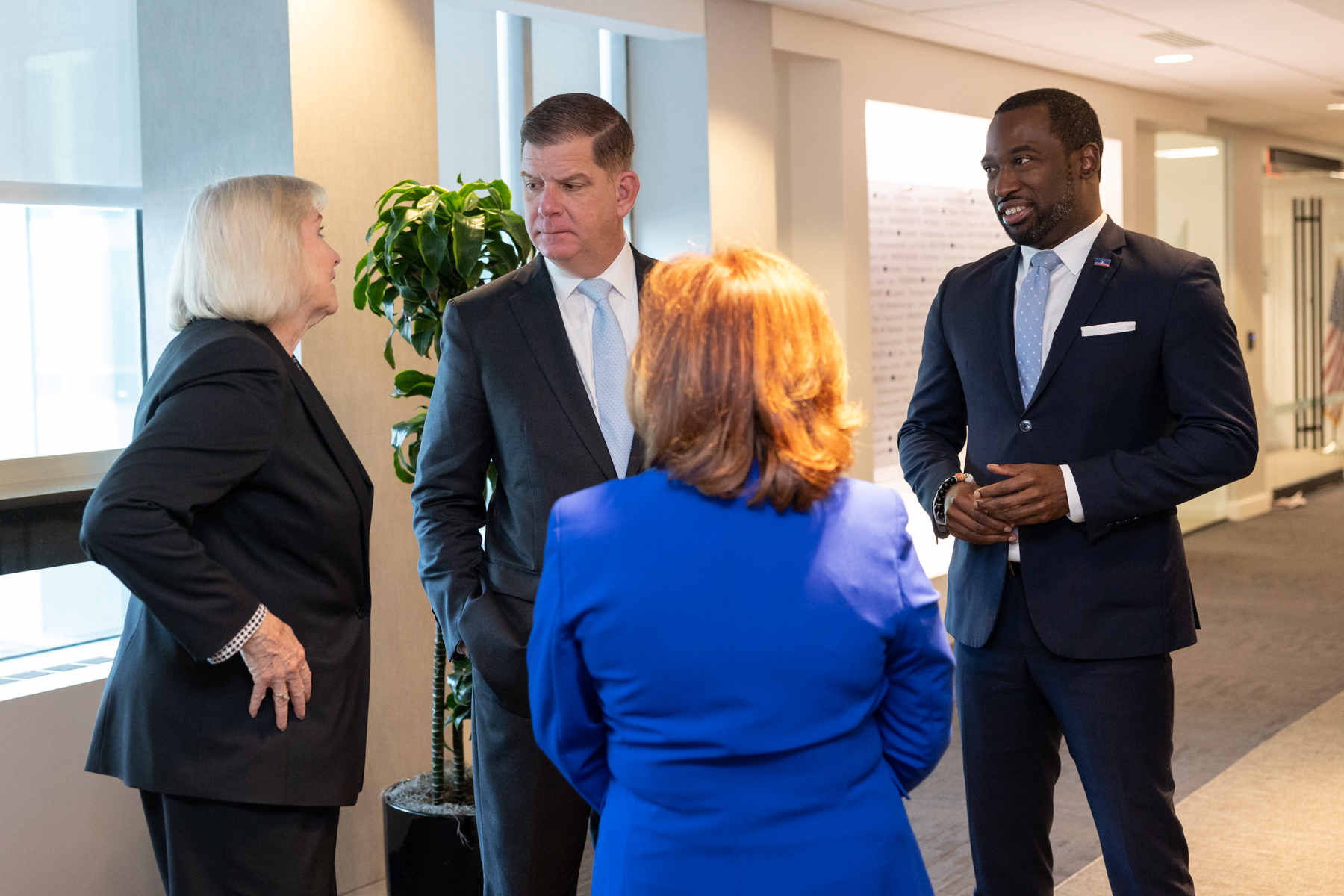
L-R: TN State Senator Becky Duncan Massey, U.S. Sec. of Labor Marty Walsh, CO Lt. Gov. Dianne Primavera, and Stoney at a 2022 meeting for the Mental Health Matters Taskforce

=== Elections and transition ===
On April 21, 2016, Stoney announced that he would run for Mayor of Richmond in the 2016 election. He announced his candidacy after resigning as Secretary of the Commonwealth. The incumbent, Dwight Clinton Jones, was ineligible to run for reelection due to Richmond's two-term limit.

Stoney won the election over Jack Berry, 36% to 34%, with Joe Morrissey in third place. Shortly after the election, Mayor-elect Stoney named Tiffany Jana and Bill Leighty as co-chairs of his transition team, with University of Richmond professor Thad Williamson named as director.

Stoney was sworn into office on December 31, 2016. At 35 years of age, he became Richmond's youngest elected mayor. He was the third strong mayor in the city's history.

Stoney was reelected in 2020 winning the most votes in six of Richmond's nine districts allowing him to avoid a runoff.

=== Tenure ===
==== Performance review ====
Upon taking office as mayor, Stoney commissioned a top-to-bottom performance audit of all city departments, conducted by the Wilder School of Government and Public Affairs at VCU, to be completed within 100 days of taking office with the aim of improving efficiency and address dissatisfaction with Richmond's government to create a more efficient administration.

==== Cigarette tax ====
In March 2019, Mayor Stoney proposed adding a 50-cent tax per pack of cigarettes, representing Richmond's first cigarette tax. The City Council approved the 2020 budget, which included a $17 million increase for Richmond Public Schools and over $15 million for street paving, and was not able to find a majority consensus on eliminating or decreasing Stoney's proposed cigarette tax, allowing it to pass with the budget with projections it would generate over $3 million annually.

==== Education ====
===== Education funding =====
On September 3, 2020, Stoney presented the keys to three new schools—Cardinal Elementary, Henry Marsh Elementary, and River City Middle—to their principals after construction that was financed thanks to funding from a 1.5% increase in the meals tax he had proposed. The new schools were described as much needed addition to Richmond Public Schools and featured specialized facilities such as science labs, art and music classrooms, and "calm down" rooms, contributing to enhanced learning environments for Richmond students.

In another effort to support the Richmond Public School System, Stoney passed the "Pathways Program" which pays for any Richmond Public School student's tuition at J. Sargeant Reynolds Community College beginning fall 2023. Additionally, the Stoney administration was able to increase local contributions to the public school system by 46.1% since the 2017 fiscal year while also investing in the Positive Youth Development & Youth Violence Prevention Fund for 12–19 year olds in the area.

The fiscal year 2025 budget brought total local contributions to Richmond Public Schools to $239.3 million, an increase of 58%.

===== After-school programming =====
Stoney made expanding out-of-school programming to reach every elementary and middle school student a priority during his campaign and maintained the commitment in office. In 2018, Stoney announced the expansion of Richmond Public Schools to allow all 33 Richmond Public Schools (RPS) elementary and middle schools to provide every students with transportation to and from the programs. The expansion was funded by local nonprofits and the private sector. By 2020, after-school programming was available at all Richmond elementary and middle schools at least twice a week focused on arts, science, athletics and more provided by the Boys & Girls Clubs of Metro Richmond as part of a partnership with a local nonprofit, NextUp RVA, with transportation provided by RPS.

==== Public safety ====
===== Positive Youth Development Fund =====
In 2022, Stoney launched the Positive Youth Development Fund initiative as part of Richmond's broader gun violence prevention strategy. The fund, which incorporated American Rescue Plan Act funding, provides financial support to community-based organizations that offer programs aimed at keeping youth engaged and providing safe, constructive environments driven by the need to address the root causes of youth violence through educational and recreational opportunities, particularly during out-of-school time. In its first year, the fund awarded $1 million through NextUp RVA to combat youth violence and improve safety in addition to funding to the Carol Adams Foundation to fund a summer camp, supporting summer camps and other youth-oriented programs across the city.

By 2024, the Positive Youth Development Fund had distributed nearly $500,000 in additional grants to over 40 nonprofit organizations. These grants are used to enhance youth programs focusing on arts, education, athletics, and mental health resources, with the goal of breaking cycles of violence and fostering positive development for children in vulnerable communities. The fund is part of a larger city initiative to reduce violent crime, which decreased 22% under Stoney as funding for Richmond Public Schools and expanded after-school programming increased.

===== Public safety task force =====
In July 2020, Stoney announced the formation of a task force to "reimagine" public safety with 20 members tasked with reviewing the city's law enforcement policies to recommending changes. The initiative aimed to promote transparency and improve public safety by addressing key issues including the Richmond Police Department's use of force policies and the broader need for reform in Virginia's law enforcement practices.

After three months of review, the Task Force presented 15 recommendations focused on police accountability, use of force training, enhanced mental health resources, and greater community engagement. The recommendations aimed to improve the relationship between law enforcement and the Richmond community, emphasizing the need for a more accountable, transparent, and community-oriented approach to public safety.

===== Civilian Review Board (CRB) =====
In 2022, Stoney proposed the creation of an independent Civilian Review Board (CRB) in Richmond to oversee the police department, an initiative that was later approved by the City Council. The CRB, established in response to recommendations from the Public Safety Task Force, aims to increase oversight and accountability within the Richmond Police Department.

The board, consisting of eight members, will review officer misconduct, internal investigations, and provide policy and disciplinary recommendations. With a focus on enhancing police transparency and public safety, the CRB will require a five-member majority to advance any proposed actions.

==== Housing policy ====
Addressing the city's affordable housing crisis was a key priority for Stoney upon taking office and he set out a goal of building 1,000 new affordable housing units per year. In 2024, Stoney announced that the city was exceeding the goal and adding new units more rapidly than expected to manage the crisis.

===== Virginia's first eviction diversion program =====
Stoney announced Virginia's first eviction diversion program during his 2019 state of the city address unveiling a 20-year action plan to combat an "eviction pandemic" in the city of Richmond. This came following an article in the New York Times published data which named Richmond as number two in the nation for evictions at the start of his term. The program provides cash assistance, legal aid assistance, and financial literacy education for those in the process of being evicted and aimed to develop more affordable housing over the next five years. In its first five months, the program had helped 122 residents avoid eviction. In 2024, Stoney stated that the program had helped more than 1,600 families avoid eviction.

===== Development of affordable housing =====
Since Stoney took office, Richmond had built 5,000 new affordable housing units. Stoney has set a goal of creating 1,000 new affordable rental units per year. In a public-private collaboration, the Richmond Redevelopment and Housing Authority (RRHA) worked with a nonprofit developer to redevelop one of its properties for redevelopment to expand homeownership opportunities. The project was initiated with groundbreaking ceremony in August 2022. The project, divided into three phases, was expected to cost around $22 million per phase with initial funding coming from funded by Virginia Housing through its Low-Income Housing Tax Credit Program, and other state and department grants. The redevelopment followed a 'build first' approach, ensuring new housing is constructed before relocating current residents. In April 2023, the Richmond City Council finance committee approved over $20 million to advance the next phase of the project.

Further efforts to redevelop other areas, including Gilpin Court and Jackson Ward, were initiated with a focus on increasing affordable housing and engaging residents in the planning process. In 2021, Stoney proclaimed April 17 as "Giles B. Jackson Day" recognizing all of Giles B. Jackson's accomplishments, and it was awarded on the 150th anniversary of the historic Jackson Ward neighborhood.

In 2023, Stoney proposed two affordable housing projects in South Richmond. His administration also utilized its grant program to offer tax breaks to a developer to add affordable housing as part of a planned development in Manchester. This followed the city's $65 million housing project in Manchester announced in June 2023 which would have "locked" "base rates" for 30 years.

===== Partnership with the Local Initiatives Support Corporation =====
Stoney's 2023–2024 city budget included $50 million towards developing affordable housing in Richmond City. On November 1, Stoney and the Local Initiatives Support Corporation (LISC) announced that the LISC would match the city's $50 million to create a "historic" $100 million budget to help build more affordable housing. The investment was expected to help supercharge the city's efforts to build 40,000 new needed units of affordable housing.

===== Declaration of housing crisis =====
During a press conference on March 28, 2023, Stoney and City Council members declared a housing crisis in Richmond and called on state legislators to provide assistance and relief as well as nonprofit organizations to help develop solutions for the lack of affordable housing available. A resolution officially declaring the city in a housing crisis passed on April 10. This followed an announcement by the mayor that he had allocated $50 million over the next five years towards developing new affordable housing in the city to tackle the city's longterm housing crisis.

In January 2023, at a United States Conference of Mayors discussion with other major city mayors on the affordable housing crisis, Stoney discussed Richmond's efforts to address the crisis and expressed frustration with dealing with out-of-town investors low-value offers and their inadequate care of property acquired in the city.

==== 2023–2024 city budget ====
For the 2023–2024 fiscal year, Stoney proposed a $3 billion city budget. This came after listening to the public in order to make the government more effective and efficient. Under this new proposal, many city employees would receive pay raises, including a 5% pay raise for almost all police officers and firefighters in the city. Non-sworn employees would receive an 8% salary increase. The wage increase was funded by a $9 increase in utility costs for city residents. Stoney aimed to ensure that no hourly-paid employee working for the city government would be paid less than $18 per hour.

As part of the budget, $21.1 million would also be allocated to public schools and $50 million would be allocated towards developing affordable housing over a five-year time period. The budget also allocated $50 million towards a capital improvement program for the city and an additional $15 million towards restoring the William Fox Elementary School and $21 million towards new transportation infrastructure.

=== Removal of Richmond's Confederate statues ===
In 2017, Stoney established the Monument Avenue Commission to assess the future of Richmond's Confederate statues. The commission was initially focusing on adding historical context rather than removal with Stoney describing the monuments as an endorsement of injustices perpetrated by the Confederacy. Initially, Stoney preferred adding historical context and authentic background information to Confederate statues arguing removal of the historical artifacts does not do anything to recognize the history and actions behind them. However, following the violent 2017 Unite the Right rally in Charlottesville, Stoney urged the commission to consider the removal or relocation of the statues.

In June 2020, nationwide riots including in Richmond at the Robert E. Lee Statue on Monument Avenue were sparked by the murder of George Floyd. Police responded by tear gassing the crowd. The next day, over a thousand rioters gathered outside of City Hall. In response, Stoney met the crowd outside City Hall, apologized for the attack, and recognized that the police's actions were inexcusable. Following public pressure, Richmond Police released an apology from the chief of police announcing that the officers involved were pulled from the field. Stoney responded by showing up to another riot, apologizing to the crowd for violating their rights.

On July 1, 2020, the day a new state law granting Richmond control over its Confederate monuments took effect, Stoney used his emergency powers to order the immediate removal of the statues. He took the step arguing that there was an "urgent need to protect the public" describing the removal of 11 Confederate monuments as necessary to public safety after frequent riots around the monuments and attempts by rioters to take the monuments down themselves. He also asserted that "immediate removal will expedite the healing process for the city. Stoney highlighted the need to move beyond the symbolic weight of Confederate monuments and actively address racial injustices ingrained in the city's history. His decision faced opposition from the city council and interim city attorney.

In December 2022, Richmond removed its last remaining Confederate monument following a lengthy court battle. The monument, to General A. P. Hill, were planned to be transferred to the Black History Museum and Cultural Center of Virginia while Hill's remains (which were beneath his monument) would be moved to a cemetery. Stoney's actions to remove the monuments were described as showing an "unprecedented commitment to racial justice" and were the subject of an essay he published in the New York Times in summer 2021 describing the events leading to his decision to take down the Confederate statues.

In 2023, Stoney reestablished the city's History and Culture Commission to develop a plan for renaming Richmond's streets and public spaces that still honor Confederate figures and slave owners, following the removal of the city's Confederate statues.

=== Participation in national organizations ===
==== U.S. Conference of Mayors ====
In 2019, Stoney was appointed chair of the U.S. Conference of Mayors' Children, Health, and Human Services Standing Committee. The appointment was based on his leadership and collaboration in providing resources and programs for children and families in Richmond.

==== Democratic Mayors Association ====
In January 2022, Stoney was elected as President of the Democratic Mayors Alliance, a national Democratic Party coalition dedicated to electing Democratic mayors. Stoney thus serves as a member of the Democratic National Committee. Stoney was previously on the board of the organization, and filled the vacancy left by Los Angeles Mayor Eric Garcetti, whom President Joe Biden has nominated to serve as Ambassador to India.

== Statewide politics ==
=== 2025 election ===
In December 2023, Stoney announced that he would run for governor of Virginia in the 2025 election. His campaign was endorsed by former Governor and 2021 gubernatorial candidate Terry McAuliffe. Polling in January 2024 found that fellow Democratic candidate Abigail Spanberger led the primary with 52%, with 8% in support of Stoney.

Stoney suspended his campaign for governor in April 2024 and announced that he would run for lieutenant governor of Virginia instead. In July 2025, Stoney narrowly lost the Democratic primary to Richmond-area state senator Ghazala Hashmi.

==== Loss ====
Stoney decisively lost Democratic primary voters in the Richmond metro area to Hashmi; in the city proper, Hashmi defeated him by 10,500 votes, larger than her statewide victory margin of 3,500. In interviews, some Richmond voters specifically cited as reasons not to vote for him the city's 2025 water crisis, Stoney's support for a 2023 casino referendum, and his support for a failed redevelopment deal in downtown Richmond. Support in the city was highest among low-income black neighborhoods that had supported the casino referendum. However, in some parts of the city, especially the West End, Stoney received very low vote counts, finishing very low in the rankings and receiving very few total votes in some precincts. Political analyst Bob Holsworth said that city voters had an almost "visceral" reaction against Stoney. However, Stoney did perform well in Northern Virginia and majority-black Southside Virginia, and still did relatively well in the city, with Delegate Mike Jones citing certain successes, such as the construction of schools and community centers and the city's receipt of a AAA bond rating.

== Electoral history ==
2016 Richmond, Virginia, mayoral election
Party	Candidate	Votes	%
Democratic	Levar Stoney	35,525	35.64
Democratic	Jack Berry	33,447	33.56
Independent	Joe Morrissey	20,995	21.06
Democratic	Michelle Mosby	5,792	5.81
Democratic	Jon Baliles	2,230	2.24
Independent	Lawrence Williams	543	0.54
Republican	Bruce Tyler	500	0.50
Independent	Bobby Junes	381	0.38
Write-in		255	0.26
Total votes		99,668	100
Democratic hold			

2020 Richmond, Virginia, mayoral election
Party	Candidate	Votes	%
Democratic	Levar Stoney	41,145	37.72
Democratic	Alexsis Rodgers	28,885	26.48
Democratic	Kimberly Gray	28,478	26.11
Republican	M. Justin Griffin	7,786	7.14
Independent	Michael Gilbert (withdrawn)	1,473	1.35
Democratic	Tracey McLean	1,099	1.01
Write-in		220	0.20
Total votes		109,086	100
Democratic hold			

=== 2025 Democratic Lieutenant Governor Primary ===
Results by county and independent city: Hashmi: 20–30%; 30–40%; 40–50%; 50–60%; Stoney: 20–30%; 30–40%; 40–50%; 50–60%; 60–70%; 70–80%; Rouse: 20–30%; 30–40%; 40–50%; 50–60%; 60–70%; Lateef: 30–40%; Bastani: 30–40%; Tie: 20–30%

2025 Virginia Lt. Governor Democratic primary
Party	Candidate	Votes	%
Democratic	Ghazala Hashmi	131,865	27.39%
Democratic	Levar Stoney	128,262	26.64%
Democratic	Aaron Rouse	126,802	26.34%
Democratic	Babur Lateef	40,447	8.40%
Democratic	Alex Bastani	27,386	5.69%
Democratic	Victor Salgado	26,682	5.54%
Total votes		481,444	100.00%

Political offices
Preceded by Janet Vestal Kelly	Secretary of Virginia; 2014–2016	Succeeded by Kelly Thomasson
Preceded by Dwight C. Jones	Mayor of Richmond; 2017–2025	Succeeded by Danny Avula
