= 2026 Virginia Question 2 =

Referendum on same-sex and interracial marriage

- November 3, 2026
- Question: Should the Constitution of Virginia be amended to: (i) remove the ban on same-sex marriage; (ii) affirm that two adults may marry regardless of sex, gender, or race; and (iii) require all legally valid marriages to be treated equally under the law?
- Reporting: 99.0% as of 10:40 a.m. EST
- Outcome: Passed

Results
Choice	Votes	%
Yes	2,085,272	57.78%
No	1,523,413	42.22%
County and independent city results
Yes
80–90%
70–80%
60–70%
50–60%
No
80–90%
70–80%
60–70%
50–60%

Question 2 is a legislatively referred constitutional amendment on the November 2026 ballot in the state of Virginia. The measure amended the state's constitution to repeal its unenforceable ban on same-sex marriage, and added new provisions requiring the state to recognize marriages without regard to sex, gender, or race. The amendment made Virginia the fifth state to repeal a constitutional same-sex marriage ban, following Nevada in 2020, and California, Colorado, and Hawaii in 2024.

== Background ==
=== Interracial marriage ===
Following the U.S. Supreme Court striking down Virginia's ban on interracial marriage in Loving v. Virginia in 1967, the General Assembly repealed the remainder of the Racial Integrity Act in 1975, as well as the Sterilization Act in 1979. In 2019, a Virginia law that required partners to declare their race on marriage applications was challenged in court. Within a week the state's attorney-general directed that the question is to become optional, and in October 2019, a U.S. District judge ruled the practice unconstitutional and barred Virginia from enforcing the requirement. On March 10, 2020, SB 62 was signed into law to repeal the requirement.

=== Same-sex marriage ===
In 2006, voters agreed to ban same-sex marriage and any legal status that "approximates the design, qualities, significance, or effects of marriage". However, in 2014, in Bostic v. Schaefer, the United States Court of Appeals for the Fourth Circuit found the amendment to be in violation of the due process and equal protection clauses of the Fourteenth Amendment, thereby making it unenforceable. Due to Obergefell v. Hodges, constitutional bans on same-sex marriage in Virginia and other states have been inoperative since 2015. In 2020, two bills (HB 1490 and SB 17) were signed into law, repealing provisions of the Code of Virginia that banned same-sex marriage and civil unions. In 2024, HB 174, which affirms the right of same-sex couples to marry and allows clergy to refuse to wed couples, was signed into law.

The push to repeal the defunct and unenforceable language in the state constitution followed Supreme Court Justice Clarence Thomas's opinion in Dobbs v. Jackson Women's Health Organization, the case overturning the constitutionally recognized right to abortion, where he argued that Obergefell v. Hodges, which found that same-sex couples have a fundamental right to marry, should be overturned. It also followed Nevada in 2020 repealing its defunct ban, and California, Colorado, and Hawaii repealing their bans in 2024.

=== Legislation for the amendment ===
In Virginia, constitutional amendments require approval in two legislative sessions before they can go before voters.

==== 163rd session ====
During the 163rd Virginia General Assembly, in the State Senate, SJ249 was the resolution given approval.

January 21, 2025, vote in the state Senate on SJ249
Political affiliation	Voted for	Voted against	Not voting
Democratic Party	21	-	-
Republican Party	3	15	1
Total	24	15	1

The bill was then sent to the State House.

February 13, 2025, vote in the state House on SJR249
Political affiliation	Voted for	Voted against	Not voting
Democratic Party	51	-	-
Republican Party	7	34	8
Total	58	34	8

In the state House, the resolution given approval was House Joint Resolution 9. Like the Senate's bill, HJR 9 was also approved in the other legislative house; this time, the state Senate.

January 14, 2025, vote in the state House on HJR9
Political affiliation	Voted for	Voted against	Not voting
Democratic Party	51	-	-
Republican Party	7	35	7
Total	58	35	7

The bill was then sent to the state Senate.

January 31, 2025, vote in the state Senate on HJ9
Political affiliation	Voted for	Voted against	Not voting
Democratic Party	21	-	-
Republican Party	3	15	1
Total	24	15	1

==== 164th session ====
During the 164th Virginia General Assembly, Senate Joint Resolution 3 was engrossed by the state Senate by a voice vote 26–12.

January 16, 2026, vote in the State Senate on SJ3
Political affiliation	Voted for	Voted against	Not voting
Democratic Party	21	-	-
Republican Party	5	12	2
Total	26	12	2

February 2, 2026, vote in the State House on SJ3
Political affiliation	Voted for	Voted against	Not voting
Democratic Party	59	-	5
Republican Party	2	32	2
Total	61	32	7

HJR3 was passed by the state House in a 66 to 31 vote.

January 14, 2026, vote in the State House on HJR3
Political affiliation	Voted for	Voted against	Not voting
Democratic Party	63	-	-
Republican Party	3	31	2
Total	66	31	2

January 16, 2026, vote in the State Senate on HJR3
Political affiliation	Voted for	Voted against	Not voting
Democratic Party	21	-	-
Republican Party	5	13	1
Total	26	13	1

Legislation to enable the referendum was passed 66–32 in the House on January 29 and 24–16 in the Senate on February 2.

== Contents and amendment ==
=== Ballot wording ===
The following question was displayed to voters at the referendum:

Question: Should the Constitution of Virginia be amended to: (i) remove the ban on same-sex marriage; (ii) affirm that two adults may marry regardless of sex, gender, or race; and (iii) require all legally valid marriages to be treated equally under the law?

=== Constitutional changes ===
Following agreement by a majority of voters, Section 15-A of Article I of the Constitution of Virginia was amended as follows:

Section 15-A. Marriage.

That ~~only a union between one man and one woman may be a marriage valid in or recognized by this Commonwealth and its political subdivisions~~ marriage is one of the vital personal rights essential to the orderly pursuit of happiness.

This Commonwealth and its political subdivisions shall not ~~create or recognize a legal status for relationships of unmarried individuals that intends to approximate the design, qualities, significance, or effects of marriage~~ deny the issuance of a marriage license to two adult persons seeking a lawful marriage on the basis of the sex, gender, or race of such persons. ~~Nor shall this Commonwealth or its political subdivisions create or recognize another union, partnership, or other legal status to which is assigned the rights, benefits, obligations, qualities, or effects of marriage.~~ This Commonwealth and its political subdivisions shall recognize any lawful marriage between two adult persons and treat such marriages equally under the law, regardless of the sex, gender, or race of such persons.

== Endorsements ==
Yes

U.S. senators

- Mark Warner (2009–present) (Democratic)

U.S. representatives

- Barbara Comstock, VA-10 (2015–2019) (Republican)
- Denver Riggleman, VA-5 (2019–2021) (Independent; elected as a Republican)
- James Walkinshaw, VA-11 (2025–present) (Democratic)

Statewide officials

- David Bulova, Virginia secretary of natural and historic resources (2026–present) (Democratic)
- Ghazala Hashmi, lieutenant governor of Virginia (2026–present) (Democratic)
- Candi King, Virginia secretary of state (2026–present) (Democratic)
- Mark Sickles, Virginia secretary of finance (2026–present) (Democratic)
- Abigail Spanberger, governor of Virginia (2026–present) (Democratic)

State legislators

- 63 state delegates (Note: Kimberly Adams, HD-82 (2026–present) (Democratic); Jessica Anderson, HD-71 (2026–present) (Democratic); Bonita Anthony, HD-92 (2024–present) (Democratic); Alex Askew, HD-95 (2024–present) (Democratic); Robert Bloxom Jr., HD-100 (2014–present) (Republican); Katrina Callsen, HD-54 (2024–present) (Democratic); Kacey Carnegie, HD-89 (2026–present) (Democratic); Betsy Carr, HD-78 (2024–present) (Democratic); Stacey Carroll, HD-64 (2026–present) (Democratic); Nadarius Clark, HD-84 (2024–present) (Democratic); Laura Jane Cohen, HD-15 (2024–present) (Democratic); Joshua Cole, HD-65 (2024–present) (Democratic); Nicole Cole, HD-66 (2026–present) (Democratic); Kelly Convirs-Fowler, HD-96 (2024–present) (Democratic); Rae Cousins, HD-79 (2024–present) (Democratic); Karrie Delaney, HD-9 (2024–present) (Democratic); Lindsey Dougherty, HD-75 (2026–present) (Democratic); Mark Downey, HD-69 (2026–present) (Democratic); Michael Feggans, HD-97 (2024–present) (Democratic); Lily Franklin, HD-41 (2026–present) (Democratic); Debra Gardner, HD-76 (2024–present) (Democratic); Tom Garrett, HD-56 (2024–present) (Republican); Jackie Glass, HD-93 (2024–present) (Democratic); Elizabeth Guzmán, HD-22 (2026–present) (Democratic); Cliff Hayes, HD-91 (2024–present) (Democratic); Dan Helmer, HD-10 (2024–present) (Democratic); Rozia Henson, HD-19 (2024–present) (Democratic); Phil Hernandez, HD-94 (2024–present) (Democratic); Charniele Herring, HD-4 (2024–present) (Democratic); Patrick Hope, HD-1 (2024–present) (Democratic); Karen Keys-Gamarra, HD-7 (2024–present) (Democratic); Paul Krizek, HD-16 (2024–present) (Democratic); Amy Laufer, HD-55 (2024–present) (Democratic); Destiny LeVere Bolling, HD-80 (2024–present) (Democratic); Alfonso Lopez, HD-3 (2024–present) (Democratic); Michelle Maldonado, former HD-20 (2024–2026) (Democratic); Marty Martinez, HD-29 (2024–present) (Democratic); John McAuliff, HD-30 (2026–present) (Democratic); Adele McClure, HD-2 (2024–present) (Democratic); Joseph McNamara, HD-40 (2024–present) (Republican); R. Kirk McPike, HD-39 (2026–present) (Democratic); Delores McQuinn, HD-81 (2024–present) (Democratic); Leslie Mehta, HD-73 (2026–present) (Democratic); May Nivar, HD-57 (2026–present) (Democratic); Marcia Price, HD-85 (2024–present) (Democratic); Sam Rasoul, HD-38 (2024–present) (Democratic); Atoosa Reaser, HD-27 (2024–present) (Democratic); David Reid, HD-28 (2024–present) (Democratic); Don Scott, Speaker (2024–present) HD-88 (2020–present) (Democratic); Holly Seibold, HD-12 (2024–present) (Democratic); Briana Sewell, HD-25 (2024–present) (Democratic); Irene Shin, HD-8 (2024–present) (Democratic); Marcus Simon, HD-13 (2024–present) (Democratic); Shelly Simonds, HD-70 (2024–present) (Democratic); Jas Jeet Singh, HD-26 (2025–present) (Democratic); Rip Sullivan, HD-6 (2024–present) (Democratic); Joshua Thomas, HD-21 (2024–present) (Democratic); Virgil Thornton Sr., HD-86 (2026–present) (Democratic); Luke Torian, HD-24 (2024–present) (Democratic); Kathy Tran, HD-18 (2024–present) (Democratic); Jeion Ward, HD-87 (2024–present) (Democratic); Vivian Watts, HD-14 (2024–present) (Democratic); Rodney Willett, HD-58 (2024–present) (Democratic))
- 17 state senators (Note: Lashrecse Aird, SD-13 (2024–present) (Democratic); Elizabeth Bennett-Parker, 39th district (2026–present) (Democratic); Jennifer Boysko, SD-38 (2019–present) (Democratic); Bill DeSteph, SD-20 (2024–present) (Republican); Danny Diggs, SD-24 (2024–present) (Republican); Tara Durant, SD-27 (2024–present) (Republican); Adam Ebbin, former SD-39 (2012–2025) (Democratic); Barbara Favola, SD-40 (2012–present) (Democratic); Angelia Williams Graves, SD-21 (2024–present) (Democratic); Michael Jones, SD-15 (2026–present) (Democratic); Mamie Locke, SD-23 (2004–present) (Democratic); Jeremy McPike, SD-29 (2016–present) (Democratic); Danica Roem, SD-30 (2024–present) (Democratic); Saddam Salim, SD-37 (2024–present) (Democratic); Kannan Srinivasan, SD-32 (2025–present) (Democratic); David Suetterlein, SD-04 (2024–present) (Republican); Schuyler VanValkenburg, SD-16 (2024–present) (Democratic))

Local officials

- Joe Cobb, mayor of Roanoke (2025–present) (Democratic)

Organizations

- ACLU of Virginia
- American Association of University Women
- Democratic Socialists of America
- Equality Virginia
- GLAAD
- Human Rights Campaign
- Jews United for Justice
- Metro DC Democratic Socialists of America

Political parties

- Democratic Party of Virginia
No

Federal officials

- Todd Gilbert, former United States Attorney for the Western District of Virginia (2025) (Republican)

Statewide officials

- Phill Kline, former Attorney General of Kansas (2003–2007) (Republican)
- Winsome Earle-Sears, former lieutenant governor of Virginia (2022–2026) (Republican)

State legislators

- 3 state delegates (Note: Tim Anderson, former state delegate from the 83rd district (2022–2023) (Republican); Nick Freitas, former state delegate from the 30th district (2016–2024), 33rd district (2024–2025) (Republican); Bill Wiley, state delegate from the 32nd district (2024–present) (Republican))
- Mark Peake, state senator from the 22nd district (2017–2024), 8th district (2024–present) (Republican)

Individuals

- Michael Francis Burbidge, bishop of the Diocese of Arlington
- John Reid, talk radio host and nominee for lieutenant governor in 2025 (Republican)

Organizations

- Do No Harm
- Heritage Action
- Family Foundation of Virginia
- Liberty Counsel
- Liberty University
- Virginia Catholic Conference

Political parties

- Republican Party of Virginia

== Results ==
Repeal of Same-Sex Marriage Ban Amendment results
Choice
For
Against
Total

== See also ==
- 2026 Virginia ballot measures
- 2026 Virginia elections
