= LGBTQ rights in Virginia =

- Virginia (US)
- Legal status: Legal since 2003
- Gender identity: Sex-change recognized for purposes of marriage licenses
- Discrimination protections: Sexual orientation and gender identity protections all areas since 2020

Family rights
- Recognition of relationships: Same-sex marriage since 2014
- Adoption: Yes

Lesbian, gay, bisexual, transgender, and queer (LGBTQ) people in the U.S. state of Virginia enjoy the same rights as non-LGBTQ people. LGBTQ rights in the state are a relatively recent occurrence; with most improvements in LGBT rights occurring in the 2000s and 2010s. Same-sex marriage has been legal in Virginia since October 6, 2014, when the U.S. Supreme Court refused to consider an appeal in the case of Bostic v. Rainey. Effective July 1, 2020, there is a state-wide law protecting LGBTQ persons from discrimination in employment, housing, public accommodations, and credit. The state's hate crime laws also now explicitly include both sexual orientation and gender identity.

Prior to July 1, 2020, Virginia only afforded limited protections for LGBTQ individuals (in state employment only), the state's hate crime laws did not include a provision for sexual orientation or gender identity, and the statute criminalizing sodomy between same-sex and opposite-sex couples, though declared unconstitutional nationally by the Supreme Court of the United States in 2003, was not repealed until 11 years later in 2014.

== Law regarding same-sex sexual activity ==
Virginia's statutes criminalizing sodomy between same-sex and opposite-sex couples, "crimes against nature, morals and decency," were effectively invalidated by the U.S. Supreme Court decision in Lawrence v. Texas in 2003.

On March 4, 2020, Governor Ralph Northam signed into law formally repealing § 18.2-344, the ban on fornication between unmarried persons. This ban was previously invalidated in 2005 by the Supreme Court of Virginia in Martin v. Ziherl.

On January 31, 2013, the Senate of Virginia passed a bill repealing § 18.2-345, the lewd and lascivious cohabitation statute enacted in 1877, by a vote of 40 to 0. On February 20, 2013, the Virginia House of Delegates passed the bill by a vote of 62 to 25 votes. On March 20, 2013, Governor Bob McDonnell signed the repeal of the lewd and lascivious cohabitation statute from the Code of Virginia.

On March 12, 2013, a three-judge panel of the Court of Appeals for the Fourth Circuit struck down § 18.2-361, the crimes against nature statute. On March 26, 2013, Attorney General of Virginia Ken Cuccinelli filed a petition to have the case reheard en banc, but the Court denied the request on April 10, 2013, with none of its 15 judges supporting the request. On June 25, Cuccinelli filed a petition for certiorari asking the U.S. Supreme Court to review the Court of Appeals decision, which was rejected on October 7. On February 7, 2014, the Virginia Senate voted 40–0 in favor of revising the crimes against nature statute to remove the criminalization of consensual same-sex sexual relations. On March 6, 2014, the Virginia House of Delegates voted 100–0 in favor of the bill. The bill (as amended by Governor McAuliffe's recommendations) was signed into law by Governor McAuliffe and went into effect immediately.

== Recognition of same-sex relationships ==
=== Same-sex marriage codified ===
In March 2024, the governor signed into law a bill explicitly "protecting and codifying" same-sex marriage into the Virginia Code. Effective from July 1.

Virginia voters ratified a constitutional amendment defining marriage as the union of a man and a woman in November 2006. Prior to 2020 Virginia statute also contained language banning any recognition of same-sex marriage. The constitutional amendment also prohibited the Commonwealth of Virginia and its political subdivisions, such as counties and independent cities, from creating or recognize any legal status for relationships of unmarried individuals, such as domestic partnership benefits.

In mid-2013, two lawsuits were filed in federal court challenging the state's ban on same-sex marriage. In January 2014, newly elected Attorney General Mark Herring filed a brief stating the state's reversal in the lawsuit in Norfolk: "The Attorney General has concluded that Virginia’s laws denying the right to marry to same-sex couples violate the Fourteenth Amendment to the United States Constitution." Governor Terry McAuliffe, also a recently elected Democrat, backed Herring's refusal to defend the ban.

A federal court decision in Bostic v. Rainey on February 13, 2014, found Virginia's ban on same-sex marriage unconstitutional, but stayed enforcement of that decision pending appeal. On July 28, 2014, the Fourth Circuit ruled 2–1 in favor of upholding the lower court's decision to strike down Virginia's ban on same-sex marriage. Scheduled on August 21, 2014, gay marriage was to be legal in Virginia, but was later put on hold by the Supreme Court on August 20, 2014, to review the option. Same-sex marriage in the U.S. Commonwealth of Virginia has been legal since October 6, 2014, following a decision by the Supreme Court of the United States to refuse to hear an appeal of the Fourth Circuit Court of Appeals in the case Bostic v. Schaefer. Marriages of same-sex couples subsequently began at 1 p.m on October 6 after the Circuit Court issued its mandate; the first same-sex couple to marry in the Commonwealth was Lindsey Oliver and Nicole Pries in Richmond, Virginia. Since then Virginia has performed legal marriages of same-sex couples and recognized out-of-state marriages of same-sex couples.

On March 3, 2020, Governor Ralph Northam signed into law a bill formally repealing the defunct statutory ban on same-sex marriage and civil unions.

In February 2022, a Virginia House of Delegates subcommittee blocked a bill and resolution to remove the defunct gay marriage ban within the Virginia Constitution. In January 2025, a first resolution on an amendment to repeal the constitutional ban was approved by the General Assembly. A second resolution was approved in January 2026, clearing the way for a referendum on the amendment to be placed before the voters. The referendum passed.

=== Domestic partnership ===
In December 2009, Governor Tim Kaine started a process designed to extend employee health benefits to the same-sex partners of the state's employees. After Bob McDonnell became governor in January 2010, he asked Attorney General Ken Cuccinelli for a legal opinion on such an extension of benefits, and Cuccinelli issued a legal opinion that the anticipated change to the Commonwealth's health plan required authorizing legislation. His ruling ended the administrative process Kaine had initiated.

=== Arlington County ===
Arlington County announced plans in May 1997 to modify its employee health plan so that same-sex partners could gain coverage, and on March 12, 1998, three local taxpayers asked the Arlington County Circuit Court to stop the county from doing so. The Circuit Court agreed and on appeal the Supreme Court of Virginia ruled in Arlington County v. White on April 21, 2000, that local governments are subject to state statutes and prohibited from expanding employee health insurance benefits beyond spouses or financial dependents.

=== City of Alexandria ===
An employee of the City of Alexandria can apply for Domestic Partnership benefits within the legal penumbra of the City of Alexandria provided the two parties have lived together for six (6) months or more and can prove cohabitation using shared bills, or a shared lease, among other forms of proof. It is implied that same-sex couples can apply for this benefit.

=== Hospital visitation ===
On February 5, 2007, the Virginia House of Delegates voted 97–0 in favor of a bill that would extend hospital visitation rights to same-sex couples through a designated visitor statute. On February 20, 2007, the Virginia State Senate voted 40–0 in favor of the bill. On March 26, 2007, Governor Tim Kaine signed the bill into law, which went into effect on July 1, 2007.

== Adoption and parenting ==
Virginia allows single persons and opposite-sex married couples to adopt children. The state has no explicit prohibition on adoption by same-sex couples or second-parent adoptions.

On April 20, 2011, the State Board of Social Services voted 7–2 against rules that would have prohibited discrimination in adoptions "on the basis of gender, age, religion, political beliefs, sexual orientation, disability, family status, race, color or national origin." Members cited the advice of Virginia Attorney General Ken Cuccinelli that the rules under consideration violated state law.

On February 3, 2012, the Virginia House of Delegates voted 71–28 in favor of a bill, HB 189, that authorizes adoption agencies to refuse adoptions for religious reasons. On February 9, an identical bill, SB349, passed the Virginia State Senate on a 22–18 vote. On February 21, the Senate voted 22–18 in favor of HB 189. On February 22, the House of Delegates voted 71–28 in favor of SB 349. On April 9, Governor Bob McDonnell signed both bills into law, and they took effect on July 1, 2012.

In February 2019, the Virginia General Assembly (by House vote 63-36 and Senate vote 28–12) passed a bill to explicitly and legally include surrogacy contracts for same-sex couples. The bill was signed into law in March 2019 by the Governor of Virginia Ralph Northam. The law went into effect on July 1, 2019.

In February 2021, Virginia lawmakers passed a bill to ban taxpayer dollars from going directly to religious organizations that discriminate against LGBT individuals within adoption placements.

== Discrimination protections ==
Map of Virginia counties and cities that have sexual orientation and/or gender identity anti–employment discrimination ordinances (prior to July 1, 2020) Sexual orientation and gender identity with anti–employment discrimination ordinance Sexual orientation with anti–employment discrimination ordinance and gender identity solely in public employment Sexual orientation and gender identity solely in public employment

Effective on July 1, 2020, Virginia law prohibits discrimination based on gender identity or sexual orientation in all areas, including employment. Arlington County and the independent city of Alexandria prohibit discrimination in employment for sexual orientation only.

On January 11, 2014, Governor Terry McAuliffe's first executive order prohibited employment discrimination in public sector employment. This restored the protections first provided in 2005 by Governor Mark Warner and continued under Governor Tim Kaine, which Governor Bob McDonnell had failed to include in his 2010 executive order protecting state workers from certain types of discrimination.

The Virginia Senate has passed legislation to prohibit the state government from discriminating against its employees based on sexual orientation in 2010, 2011, and 2013, but the Virginia House of Delegates did not vote on any of those measures.

On February 6, 2020, the Virginia General Assembly passed the "Virginia Values Act," which would provide nondiscrimination protections for LGBTQ people in employment, housing, credit, and public accommodations. The bill was signed into law by Governor Ralph Northam on April 11, 2020. The law took effect on July 1, 2020, the first of its kind in the Southern United States.

On March 4, 2020, Governor Ralph Northam signed into law a bill that would allow localities to enact their own non-discrimination protections against sexual orientation and gender identity.

In May 2024, Glenn Youngkin vetoed a bill on defining bullying that would have included and encompassed both sexual orientation and gender identity.

=== Lawsuits filed ===
In September 2020, several lawsuits were filed within Virginia courts by religious groups and a wedding photographer due to new anti-discrimination laws enacted and in effect since July 1, 2020 that allegedly "violates religious freedoms and expression of individuals". In March 2021, a federal judge dismissed immediately the legal challenge to Virginia's anti-discrimination laws.

In September 2021, the Virginia Supreme Court upheld a lower court ruling that reinstated a teacher who had been suspended for speaking out against transgender children and not using their pronouns, based on his Christian beliefs.

== Gay bar ban ==
In 1934, the Board of the Virginia Alcoholic Beverage Control Authority (ABC) enacted regulations regarding the sale of alcoholic beverages in the state of Virginia. There were several regulations regarding homosexual patrons. Gay bars and bars employing and serving gays and lesbians were banned and subject to fines and or prosecution. In 1991, a federal judge declared the ABC's ban on gay bars unconstitutional in the case French Quarter Cafe v. Virginia Alcoholic Beverage Control Board.

== Hate crime laws ==
Virginia's hate crime laws address violence based on race, religious conviction, color, national origin, disability, gender, sexual orientation and gender identity.

On March 4, 2020, Governor Ralph Northam signed into law a bill that would add sexual orientation and gender identity to the state's hate crime laws. This law took effect on July 1, 2020.

== Gay and trans panic defense ==
The bill (HB 2132) to repeal the gay panic defense passed the Virginia General Assembly in March 2021. It was signed into law by the Governor of Virginia Ralph Northam and went into effect on July 1.

== Gender identity and expression ==
Individuals within Virginia since 1979 needed sex reassignment surgery to change sex on a birth certificate. However, effective September 1, 2020, individuals will just need “appropriate clinical treatment” to change sex on a birth certificate under recently passed and signed laws by both the Virginia General Assembly and the Governor of Virginia cutting red tape.

Effective July 1, 2020, Virginia began offering an "X" gender marker on state driver's licenses.

In 2014, a transgender high school student in Gloucester County was not allowed to use the boys' bathroom, but a court ruled that the school board acted unlawfully in preventing him from using the bathroom, and the U.S. Supreme Court in 2021 let that lower court's ruling stand.

=== Department of Education ===
In July 2023, the Virginia Department of Education passed explicit policies that includes banning bathroom access and pronoun usage for transgender individuals within all schools and classrooms. The policy is intended to be reversed by Virginia governor-elect Abigail Spanberger in 2026.

=== Sports ===
In February 2025, following Trump’s executive order, the Virginia High School League banned transgender athletes from girls’ sports.

== Health ==
=== Department of Health ===
In early 2023, Glenn Youngkin's office removed two LGBTQ youth initiatives, Queer Kid Stuff and Q Chat Space, from a Department of Health webpage after the Daily Wire contacted the state regarding them.

=== Conversion therapy ===
Virginia prohibits health care providers from trying to change the sexual orientation and/or gender identity of minors.

=== HIV law reforms ===
In March 2021, the Virginia General Assembly passed a bill (SB1138) to decriminalize and modernize HIV laws. The bill (SB1138) was signed into law by the Governor of Virginia Ralph Northam on March 31, 2021. This would make Virginia the first southern US state to legally do this.

=== PREP insurance bill veto ===
In March 2025, Governor Glenn Youngkin vetoed a simple bipartisan bill that would have legally prohibited health insurance companies from discriminating against individuals who take PREP to prevent HIV transmission. This veto has undoubted negative affects on LGBTQ+ (as well as non-LGBTQ+) individuals within the commonwealth, and encourages the spread of HIV through the general U.S. population.

== 21-member LGBTIQ+ advisory panel ==
In March 2021, a bill was signed into law by the Virginia Governor Ralph Northam that will establish a 21-member LGBTIQ+ advisory panel from July 1.

== Don't Say Gay law discovered ==
In August 2022, it was discovered that Virginia "accidentally implemented" a Don't Say Gay law (similar to Florida) – only because of an archaic legal explicit backdated reference, that defines homosexuality as inherently sexual conduct (listed within the Code of Virginia). Schools are legally prohibited from accessing explicit sexual conduct materials within the classroom as a criminal offence since July 1, 2022 within Virginia, under a bill signed into law by the Governor of Virginia.

== Major political party platforms ==
The Democratic Party of Virginia platform follows the platform of the Democratic National Committee.

The Virginia Republican Party follows the Virginia Republican Creed, which does not explicitly address LGBT rights. The creed simply states, "That all individuals are entitled to equal rights, justice, and opportunities and should assume their responsibilities as citizens in a free society."

== Summary table ==
Same-sex sexual activity legal	Yes (Since 2003; codified in 2014)
Equal age of consent	Yes (Since 2003; codified in 2014)
Anti-discrimination laws in all areas that explicitly cover both sexual orientation and gender identity	Yes (Since 2020)
Same-sex marriages and other relationship recognition	Yes (Since 2015 – nationwide; codified by legislation in 2024)
Gay or trans panic defence abolished	Yes (Since 2021)
Joint and stepchild adoption by same-sex couples	Yes / No (However “religious exemptions” apply)
Lesbian, gay and bisexual people allowed to serve openly within the military	Yes (Since 2011 – nationwide)
Transgender and intersex individuals allowed to serve openly within the military	No (Since 2025, under an executive order)
Right to change legal gender without sexual reassignment surgery	Yes (Since 2020)
Access to IVF for lesbians	Yes
Hate crime laws that explicitly cover both sexual orientation and gender identity	Yes (Since 2020)
Conversion therapy banned on minors	Yes (Since 2020)
Third gender option	Yes (Since 2020)
Commercial surrogacy for gay male couples	Yes (Since 2019)
MSMs allowed to donate blood	Yes

== See also ==
- LGBTQ rights in West Virginia
- Law of Virginia
- French Quarter Cafe v. Virginia Alcoholic Beverage Control Board
