= Same-sex marriage in Virginia =

Same-sex marriage has been legal in Virginia since October 6, 2014, following the decision of the U.S. Supreme Court not to hear an appeal of the Fourth Circuit Court of Appeals' ruling in Bostic v. Schaefer. On January 14, 2014, Judge Arenda Wright Allen of the U.S. District Court for the Eastern District of Virginia ruled in Bostic that Virginia's statutory and constitutional bans on the state recognition of same-sex marriages were unconstitutional, a decision upheld by the Fourth Circuit on July 28, 2014. Same-sex marriages began following the Supreme Court's decision on October 6, and since then Virginia has performed legal marriages of same-sex couples and recognized out-of-state same-sex marriages. Same-sex marriage is also supported by both of the state's senators, Democrats Mark Warner and Tim Kaine. Polling suggests that a large majority of Virginia residents support the legal recognition of same-sex marriage.

Previously, the state had passed a statute prohibiting same-sex marriage in 1975, and further restrictions were added in 1997 and 2004, which made "void and unenforceable" any arrangements between same-sex couples bestowing the "privileges or obligations of marriage". Voters approved an amendment to the Constitution of Virginia reinforcing the existing laws in 2006. The Virginia General Assembly repealed the statutory ban on same-sex marriages in 2020. In 2026, both chambers provided final approval to an amendment to repeal the state's constitutional ban on same-sex unions. The measure was approved by voters on November 3, 2026 by 58–42 percent.

== Legal restrictions ==
=== Statutes ===
In August 1975, the Code of Virginia was amended to prohibit marriages between persons of the same sex. On February 4, 1997, the Virginia State Senate approved the Affirmation of Marriage Act, by a 37–3 vote, banning the recognition of same-sex marriages from other jurisdictions and "any contractual rights created by such marriage". On February 19, the House of Delegates approved the bill, by an 81–8 vote, and on March 15, Governor George Allen signed the legislation into law, which took effect on July 1. On March 10, 2004, the Senate voted 28–10 in favor of a bill prohibiting civil unions or similar arrangements between members of the same sex, including arrangements created by private contract. On March 11, the House of Delegates approved the bill 77–21. Governor Mark Warner issued a formal recommendation to the General Assembly to remove the provisions prohibiting partnership contracts. The House of Delegates received Warner's recommendations on April 15. On April 21, it rejected the recommendations by a vote of 35–65 and by a 69–30 vote approved the bill prohibiting civil unions. That same day, the Senate approved the bill 27–12. It became law without Governor Warner's signature and went into effect on July 1, 2004.

On February 3, 2015, following the legalization of same-sex marriage in Virginia, the Senate voted in favor of a bill updating Virginia's statutory laws by making all references to marriage gender-neutral. The bill was sponsored by Senator Adam Ebbin and had bipartisan support. However, it died in a House subcommittee. In January 2016, Senator Ebbin introduced a similar bill, which also later died without a vote. Representative Marcus Simon introduced a similar bill to the House in January 2018, and a companion bill was introduced to the Senate by Ebbin. None of them passed into law. On January 28, 2020, the House of Delegates approved a bill (House Bill 1490), introduced by Nancy Guy, repealing provisions of the Code of Virginia that banned same-sex marriage and civil unions, in a 63–34 vote. On February 17, the bill passed the Senate by 28 votes to 12. It was signed into law by Governor Ralph Northam on March 3. An identical measure (Senate Bill 17), introduced by Ebbin, passed the Senate on January 21 in 25–13 vote, and the House on February 19 in a 62–38 vote. It was signed into law by Governor Northam on March 6. Both measures took effect on July 1, 2020.

January 28, 2020 vote in the House of Delegates
Political affiliation	Voted for	Voted against	Abstained	Absent (Did not vote)
Democratic Party	54: Dawn Adams; Lashrecse Aird; Alex Askew; Hala Ayala; Lamont Bagby; Jeffrey Bourne; David Bulova; Betsy B. Carr; Jennifer Carroll Foy; Lee J. Carter; Joshua G. Cole; Kelly Convirs-Fowler; Karrie Delaney; Eileen Filler-Corn; Wendy Gooditis; Nancy Guy; Elizabeth Guzmán; Cliff Hayes Jr.; Dan Helmer; Steve Heretick; Charniele Herring; Patrick Hope; Sally L. Hudson; Chris Hurst; Jay Jones; Mark Keam; Kaye Kory; Paul Krizek; Mark Levine; Joseph C. Lindsey; Alfonso H. Lopez; Delores McQuinn; Martha Mugler; Michael P. Mullin; Kathleen Murphy; Kenneth R. Plum; Marcia Price; Sam Rasoul; David A. Reid; Danica Roem; Ibraheem Samirah; Don Scott; Mark Sickles; Marcus Simon; Shelly Simonds; Suhas Subramanyam; Rip Sullivan; Luke Torian; Kathy Tran; Roslyn Tyler; Schuyler VanValkenburg; Jeion Ward; Vivian Watts; Rodney Willett	1: Clint Jenkins	–	–
Republican Party	9: Robert Bloxom Jr.; Carrie Coyner; Glenn Davis; James E. Edmunds; Matt Fariss; Keith Hodges; Jason Miyares; Bobby Orrock; Will Wampler	33: Les Adams; Terry Austin; John Avoli; Amanda Batten; Rob Bell; Kathy Byron; Jeff Campbell; Mark Cole; Chris Collins; Kirk Cox; Buddy Fowler; Nick Freitas; Todd Gilbert; Chris Head; Terry Kilgore; Barry Knight; Dave LaRock; Jay Leftwich; Danny Marshall; John McGuire; Joseph McNamara; Will Morefield; Israel O'Quinn; Charles Poindexter; Margaret Ransone; Roxann Robinson; Nick Rush; Wendell Walker; Lee Ware; Michael Webert; Tony Wilt; Thomas C. Wright; Scott Wyatt	3: Emily Brewer; Ronnie R. Campbell; Chris Runion	–
Total	63	34	3	0
Total	63.0%	34.0%	3.0%	0.0%

February 17, 2020 vote in the Senate
Political affiliation	Voted for	Voted against	Abstained	Absent (Did not vote)
Democratic Party	21: George Barker; Rob Bell; Jennifer Boysko; Creigh Deeds; Adam Ebbin; John S. Edwards; Barbara Favola; Ghazala Hashmi; Janet Howell; Lynwood Lewis; Mamie Locke; Louise Lucas; David W. Marsden; Monty Mason; Jennifer McClellan; Jeremy McPike; Joe Morrissey; Chap Petersen; Dick Saslaw; Lionell Spruill; Scott Surovell	–	–	–
Republican Party	7: Bill DeSteph; Siobhan Dunnavant; Emmett Hanger; Jen Kiggans; Tommy Norment; David Suetterlein; Jill Vogel	12: Ben Chafin; Amanda Chase; John Cosgrove; Ryan McDougle; Stephen Newman; Mark Obenshain; Mark Peake; Todd Pillion; Bryce Reeves; Frank Ruff; Bill Stanley; Richard Stuart	–	–
Total	28	12	0	0
Total	70.0%	30.0%	0.0%	0.0%

On January 24, 2023, the Virginia Senate passed a bill 25–12 affirming the right of same-sex couples to marry. The legislation would have added the following statement to state law, "A marriage between two parties shall be lawful regardless of the sex of such persons, provided that such marriage is not otherwise prohibited by the provisions of this title. Religious organizations and members of the clergy acting in their religious capacity shall have the right to refuse to perform any marriage." The bill failed to pass the House of Delegates. A similar bill was introduced in the 2024 legislative session by six Democratic lawmakers, senators Adam Ebbin, Jennifer Boysko, Jennifer Carroll Foy, Lamont Bagby, Danica Roem, and Saddam Azlan Salim. The legislation was passed 22–18 in the Senate on February 13, 2024, and passed the House on February 21, by 58 votes to 42. Governor Glenn Youngkin signed it into law on March 8. The law states:

No person authorized by §20-14 to issue a marriage license shall deny the issuance of such license to two parties contemplating a lawful marriage on the basis of the sex, gender, or race of such parties. Such lawful marriages shall be recognized in the Commonwealth regardless of the sex, gender, or race of the parties. Religious organizations and members of the clergy acting in their religious capacity shall have the right to refuse to perform any marriage. [Va. Code Ann. § 20-13.2.]

=== Constitutional amendments ===
Results of Question 2 (2026) by county and independent city: Yes 80–90% 70–80% 60–70% 50–60% / No 80–90% 70–80% 60–70% 50–60%

On February 26, 2005, the House of Delegates voted 79–17 in favor of a constitutional amendment, known as the Marshall-Newman Amendment, that would ban same-sex marriage and any "legal status for relationships of unmarried individuals that intends to approximate the design, qualities, significance, or effects of marriage". That same day, the Virginia Senate voted 30–10 in favor. An amendment to the Constitution of Virginia requires approval by two succeeding elected legislatures. As such, on January 13, 2006, the House of Delegates voted 73–22 in favor of the amendment, and on February 17 the Senate voted 29–11 in favor. On November 7, 2006, Virginia voters approved the constitutional amendment, which took effect on January 1, 2007.

On February 4, 2021, the House of Delegates voted 60–33 in favor of a constitutional amendment to repeal the Marshall-Newman Amendment, now unenforceable and void, and replace it with language affirming the fundamental right to marry regardless of gender. The amendment would have also guaranteed protections for religious clergy and their right to refuse to perform marriages as a matter of their doctrine. On February 19, the Senate voted 22–12 in favor. The amendment needed to be approved by the subsequent legislature before being placed on the ballot for approval by the Virginia electorate. However, the Republican Party took control of the House during the 2021 elections, and in February 2022 a House subcommittee voted 4–6 to table the amendment, despite popular public support. A 2021 poll from the Public Religion Research Institute showed that 71% of Virginians supported same-sex marriage, and most analysts expected the measure to pass conformably had it been placed on the ballot. Chris Head, the chairman of the subcommittee that blocked the amendment, said the measure might have passed had it been a "clean" repeal bill that did not seek to replace the ban with affirmative language declaring marriage a right. Representative Mark Sickles responded, "When you're on the wrong side of public opinion you can really make up some stories".

In July 2022, Governor Youngkin told a national television audience on Face the Nation that "in Virginia, we actually do protect same-sex marriage". Representative Abigail Spanberger tweeted, "The Governor either doesn't know Virginia's constitution or he's lying & assuming we won't notice", and Senator Ebbin issued the following statement, "Either [Youngkin] is ignorant of the status of gay marriage in Virginia or chose to lie." PolitiFact described Youngkin's statement as "mostly false" and "disingenuous". A.E. Dick Howard, a professor at the University of Virginia School of Law, said that "[i]f Obergefell were to be overturned, then, in Virginia, the marriage amendment would take precedence over any conflicting provision of state law. Same-sex marriages would not be recognized in Virginia." Democratic lawmakers announced in November 2022 that they would introduce another constitutional amendment to repeal the Marshall-Newman Amendment. Republican Delegate Tim Anderson introduced a resolution to repeal the ban in late November. Anderson, who had voted against repealing the same-sex marriage ban in the past, said, "Fundamentally, it does not change anything about Virginia law, because the U.S. Supreme Court has already declared this provision of our constitution unconstitutional. So, nothing is going to fundamentally change in Virginia, it's just mostly about removing dead language in our Constitution. […] I think you'll see most of the people that think like me in the General Assembly, the conservatives, that had a concern with the Democrat language last year, are going to support this clean version of just a straight repeal." The earliest the proposal could be placed on the ballot was in 2024. A separate amendment was introduced by Senator Ebbin in January 2023, and passed the Senate on February 2 by a vote of 25–14. It was rejected by a Republican-controlled House committee by a 1–4 vote on February 17. Ahead of the 2024 legislative session, Ebbin and Sickles filed another constitutional amendment to repeal the ban. The amendment was reported out of the Privileges and Elections Committee of the House of Delegates on November 13, 2024 by 16 votes to 5. It passed the House 58–35 on January 14, 2025, and the Senate 24–15 on January 31.

January 14, 2025 vote in the House of Delegates
Political affiliation	Voted for	Voted against	Abstained	Absent (Did not vote)
Democratic Party	51: Bonita Anthony; Alex Askew; Elizabeth Bennett-Parker; Destiny LeVere Bolling; David Bulova; Katrina Callsen; Betsy B. Carr; Nadarius Clark; Laura Jane Cohen; Joshua G. Cole; Kelly Convirs-Fowler; Rae Cousins; Karrie Delaney; Michael Feggans; Debra Gardner; Jackie Glass; Cliff Hayes Jr.; Dan Helmer; Rozia Henson; Phil Hernandez; Charniele Herring; Patrick Hope; Michael Jones; Karen Keys-Gamarra; Candi King; Paul Krizek; Amy Laufer; Alfonso H. Lopez; Michelle Maldonado; Marty Martinez; Adele McClure; Delores McQuinn; Marcia Price; Sam Rasoul; Atoosa Reaser; David A. Reid; Don Scott; Holly Seibold; Briana Sewell; Irene Shin; Mark Sickles; Marcus Simon; Shelly Simonds; Jas Jeet Singh; Rip Sullivan; Josh Thomas; Luke Torian; Kathy Tran; Jeion Ward; Vivian Watts; Rodney Willett	–	–	–
Republican Party	7: Robert Bloxom Jr.; Carrie Coyner; Tom Garrett; Chad Green; Joseph McNamara; Chris Obenshain; Otto Wachsmann	35: Jed Arnold; Terry Austin; Jason Ballard; Jeff Campbell; Will Davis; Mark Earley Jr.; Baxter Ennis; Anne Ferrell Tata; Buddy Fowler; Nick Freitas; Todd Gilbert; Tim Griffin; Geary Higgins; Keith Hodges; Terry Kilgore; Barry Knight; Jay Leftwich; Paul Milde; Will Morefield; Israel O'Quinn; Delores Riley Oates; Eric Phillips; Hillary Pugh Kent; Chris Runion; Phillip Scott; Kim Taylor; Wendell Walker; Lee Ware; Michael Webert; Bill Wiley; Wren Williams; Tony Wilt; Thomas C. Wright; Scott Wyatt; Eric Zehr	2: Amanda Batten; Bobby Orrock	5: Mike Cherry; Aijalon Cordoza; Ian Lovejoy; Danny Marshall; David Owen
Total	58	35	2	5
Total	58.0%	35.0%	2.0%	5.0%

January 31, 2025 vote in the Senate
Political affiliation	Voted for	Voted against	Abstained	Absent (Did not vote)
Democratic Party	21: Lashrecse Aird; Lamont Bagby; Jennifer Boysko; Jennifer Carroll Foy; Creigh Deeds; Adam Ebbin; Barbara Favola; Ghazala Hashmi; Mamie Locke; Louise Lucas; David W. Marsden; Jeremy McPike; Stella Pekarsky; Russet Perry; Danica Roem; Aaron Rouse; Saddam Azlan Salim; Kannan Srinivasan; Scott Surovell; Schuyler VanValkenburg; Angelia Williams Graves	–	–	–
Republican Party	3: Danny Diggs; Tara Durant; David Suetterlein	15: Luther Cifers; Christie Craig; Bill DeSteph; Timmy French; Travis Hackworth; Chris Head; Ryan McDougle; Tammy Brankley Mulchi; Mark Obenshain; Mark Peake; Todd Pillion; Bryce Reeves; Bill Stanley; Richard Stuart; Glen Sturtevant	–	1: Emily Jordan
Total	24	15	0	1
Total	60.0%	37.5%	0.0%	2.5%

The proposed amendment would add the following to the Virginia Constitution:

That marriage is one of the vital personal rights essential to the orderly pursuit of happiness.

This Commonwealth and its political subdivisions shall not deny the issuance of a marriage license to two adult persons seeking a lawful marriage on the basis of the sex, gender, or race of such persons. This Commonwealth and its political subdivisions shall recognize any lawful marriage between two adult persons and treat such marriages equally under the law, regardless of the sex, gender, or race of such persons.

The measure was approved in the following legislative session; passing the Senate 25–15 on February 2, 2026, and the House of Delegates 66–31 on February 25. As Question 2, it appeared on the November 3, 2026 ballot, (Note: Voters were asked: "Should the Constitution of Virginia be amended to (i) remove the ban on same-sex marriage; (ii) affirm that two adults may marry regardless of sex, gender, or race; and (iii) require all legally valid marriages to be treated equally under the law?") and passed with 58% of the vote. Support reached 80% in five counties and independent cities: Charlottesville (87%), Arlington (85%), Falls Church (84%), Richmond (83%), and Alexandria (82%). Opposition to the amendment was highest in Buchanan (85%), Russell (82%), Bland (81%) and Lee (81%) counties.

== Lawsuits ==
Same-sex marriage in the United States

=== Bostic v. Schaefer ===
On July 18, 2013, two gay men filed a lawsuit, Bostic v. McDonnell, in the U.S. District Court for the Eastern District of Virginia challenging the state's ban on same-sex marriage. A lesbian couple, who had married in California and were the parents of a teenager, joined the case as plaintiffs. The suit named Governor Bob McDonnell as the principal defendant. After McDonnell left office in January 2014, the case was restyled as Bostic v. Rainey, with Janet Rainey, the State Registrar of Vital Records, as the lead defendant. In January 2014, Attorney General Mark Herring and Governor Terry McAuliffe announced their support for the suit, and said they would not defend the state ban. On February 3, 2014, the House of Delegates voted 65–32 in favor of a bill giving the Virginia General Assembly the right to defend a provision of the Virginia Constitution that is contested or constitutionality questioned if the governor or attorney general choose not to defend the law, but the State Senate Committee on Rules voted 12–4 in favor of it being passed by indefinitely in rules on February 21, which effectively killed the bill for that legislative session. Judge Arenda Wright Allen heard oral arguments on February 4, with attorneys for the Norfolk Clerk of Circuit Court, George Schaefer, defending the state's ban on same-sex marriage.

On February 13, 2014, Judge Wright Allen ruled that Virginia's statutory and constitutional ban on same-sex marriage violated the U.S. Constitution. Citing Loving v. Virginia, she held that marriage is a fundamental right, that a limitation on the right to marry is therefore subject to strict scrutiny, meaning that "compelling state interests" are required to justify it. She found that Virginia's arguments in support of its ban on same-sex marriage failed to meet that standard of review, and that they did not even pass rational basis review, the least demanding judicial standard. She stayed enforcement of her ruling pending appeal as the state had requested. Wright Allen wrote in her ruling:

Our nation's uneven but dogged journey toward truer and more meaningful freedoms for our citizens has brought us continually to a deeper understanding of the first three words in our constitution: we the people. "We the people" have become a broader, more diverse family than once imagined. Justice has often been forged from fires of indignities and prejudices suffered. Our triumphs that celebrate the freedom of choice are hallowed. We have arrived upon another moment in history when we the people becomes more inclusive, and our freedom more perfect…

The Fourth Circuit Court of Appeals heard arguments on appeal on May 13, with the case now styled Bostic v. Schaefer. On July 28, a three-judge panel of the Fourth Circuit, composed of Judges Roger Gregory, Paul V. Niemeyer, and Henry F. Floyd, ruled 2–1 in favor of striking down Virginia's ban on same-sex marriage. The court found that same-sex couples have a fundamental right to marry:

We recognize that same-sex marriage makes some people deeply uncomfortable. However, inertia and apprehension are not legitimate bases for denying same-sex couples due process and equal protection of the laws. Civil marriage is one of the cornerstones of our way of life. It allows individuals to celebrate and publicly declare their intentions to form lifelong partnerships, which provide unparalleled intimacy, companionship, emotional support, and security. The choice of whether and whom to marry is an intensely personal decision that alters the course of an individual's life. Denying same-sex couples this choice prohibits them from participating fully in our society, which is precisely the type of segregation that the Fourteenth Amendment cannot countenance.

The defendants had at least 21 days (i.e. by August 21, 2014) to request a stay, or file for rehearing or rehearing en banc. Michèle McQuigg, the Prince William County Clerk of Circuit Court, an intervenor defendant in Bostic, sought a stay of the Fourth Circuit's decision, which was denied by the court on August 13, with Judges Floyd and Gregory opposing the motion and Judge Niemeyer supporting. McQuigg then petitioned for a writ of certiorari with the U.S. Supreme Court. Chief Justice John Roberts, as Circuit Justice for the Fourth Circuit, referred the matter to the full court, which stayed enforcement of the ruling on August 20. On October 6, the U.S. Supreme Court rejected Virginia's appeal in brief, allowing the Fourth Circuit to immediately lift the stay. Same-sex couples began marrying in Virginia from 1 p.m. on October 6, 2014. The first same-sex couple to marry in Virginia were Lindsey Oliver and Nicole Pries in Richmond. Dawn Turton and Beth Trent were the first couple to be issued a marriage license in Alexandria, and Catherine Gillespie and Andre Hakes were the first in Charlottesville.

Governor McAuliffe issued the following statement, "This is a historic and long overdue moment for our Commonwealth and our country. On issues ranging from recognizing same-sex marriage to extending health-care benefits to same-sex spouses of state employees, Virginia is already well-prepared to implement this historic decision. Going forward we will act quickly to continue to bring all of our policies and practices into compliance so that we can give marriages between same-sex partners the full faith and credit they deserve. [..] Equality for all men and women regardless of their race, color, creed or sexual orientation is intrinsic to the values that make us Virginians, and now it is officially inscribed in our laws as well." Chad Griffin, the president of the Human Rights Campaign, said, "Any time same-sex couples are extended, marriage equality is something to celebrate. Today is a joyous day for thousands of couples across America who will [almost] immediately feel the impact of today's Supreme Court action. But ... the complex and discriminatory patchwork of marriage laws that was prolonged today by the Supreme Court is unsustainable. The only acceptable solution is nationwide marriage equality." House Speaker William J. Howell said he was "disappointed", and Representative Bob Marshall, one of the authors of the 2006 constitutional same-sex marriage ban, stated, "Make no mistake. Once natural marriage is abolished, marriage will soon include polygamy, or threesomes, leaving innocent children to suffer the consequences and other far-reaching consequences of attempting to force legal acceptance of so-called same sex marriage." The Supreme Court also denied certiorari petitions in cases from Indiana, Wisconsin, Oklahoma and Utah that same day, legalizing same-sex marriage in those states.

=== Harris v. Rainey ===
On August 1, 2013, two lesbian couples, one of whom had married in the District of Columbia in 2011, filed a lawsuit, Harris v. McDonnell, in the U.S. District Court for the Western District of Virginia. They were represented by Lambda Legal and the American Civil Liberties Union (ACLU) and challenged both the state's denial of marriage rights to same-sex couples and its refusal to recognize same-sex marriages from other jurisdictions. They asked the court to recognize their suit as a class action on behalf of all same-sex couples in Virginia who sought to marry or had married elsewhere. On December 23, Judge Michael F. Urbanski removed Governor McAuliffe as a defendant, leaving the State Registrar of Vital Records, Janet Rainey, and the Staunton clerk who denied a license to one of the couples. On January 31, the judge certified the case as a class action, now restyled as Harris v. Rainey. On March 31, Judge Urbanski ordered Harris stayed until the Fourth Circuit issued a decision in Bostic. The Fourth Circuit allowed the parties in Harris to intervene in the Bostic appeal and file briefs, and on July 28, 2014 ruled against Virginia's same-sex marriage ban. On October 29, the plaintiffs asked the district court to enter judgment in their favor, while the defendants filed motions to dismiss the case as moot in light of Bostic and the legalization of same-sex marriage in Virginia. On February 18, 2015, the plaintiffs reached a settlement with the defendants, and were awarded $60,000 in attorneys' fees. The parties both agreed to a dismissal of the Harris case, and Judge Urbanski subsequently dismissed it.

=== Luttrell v. Cucco ===
On April 28, 2016, the Supreme Court of Virginia ruled that cohabitation laws also apply to same-sex couples. In Luttrell v. Cucco, the court ruled that Michael Luttrell no longer had to pay alimony to his ex-wife Samantha Cucco because she was living with a female partner. Under state law, alimony payments can be stopped if the payee remarries or has been "habitually cohabitating with another person in a relationship analogous to a marriage" for at least a year. The Supreme Court overturned a decision of the Virginia Court of Appeals that Luttrell had to continue paying alimony because a cohabitation was "understood to apply only to relationships between a man and a woman". "The court made the correct ruling in this case, which is to recognize that all laws regarding marriage must be applied equally regardless of the gender of the individuals involved. Marriage equality means marriage equality", said the ACLU in a press release.

== Native American nations ==
The Indian Civil Rights Act primarily aims to protect the rights of Native Americans but also reinforces the principle of tribal self-governance. While it does not grant sovereignty, the Act affirms the authority of tribes to govern their own legal affairs. Consequently, many tribes have enacted their own marriage and family laws. As a result, the Bostic ruling and the Supreme Court's Obergefell ruling did not automatically apply to tribal jurisdictions. Virginia is home to several Native American tribes, of which seven are federally recognized: the Pamunkey Indian Tribe, the Chickahominy Indian Tribe, the Chickahominy Indian Tribe Eastern Division, the Upper Mattaponi Indian Tribe, the Rappahannock Tribe, the Nansemond Indian Nation, and the Monacan Indian Nation. It is unclear if same-sex marriage is legal on their reservations as tribal officials have not publicly commented on the issue.

Native Americans have deep-rooted marriage traditions, placing a strong emphasis on community, family and spiritual connections. Traditional Tutelo marriages were monogamous, exogamous and matrilineal, though chiefs (e:kowe:) and men of high social status occasionally practiced polygyny. While there are no records of same-sex marriages being performed in Native American cultures in the way they are commonly defined in Western legal systems, many Indigenous communities recognize identities and relationships that may be placed on the LGBT spectrum. Among these are two-spirit individuals—people who embody both masculine and feminine qualities. In some cultures, two-spirit individuals assigned male at birth wear women's clothing and engage in household and artistic work associated with the feminine sphere. Historically, this identity sometimes allowed for unions between two people of the same biological sex. It is possible that Tutelo society had a designation like two-spirit, but a lot of traditional knowledge was lost in the aftermath of colonization, and so there is no strong evidence that that their culture recognized an institutionalised two-spirit status. A literal translation of the term "two-spirit" in Tutelo would be waną́či: nǫ:pa: (pronounced [waˈnãtʃiː nõːˈpaː]). Reports indicate that gender variance and homosexuality were "not censored" in Tutelo society.

== Demographics and marriage statistics ==
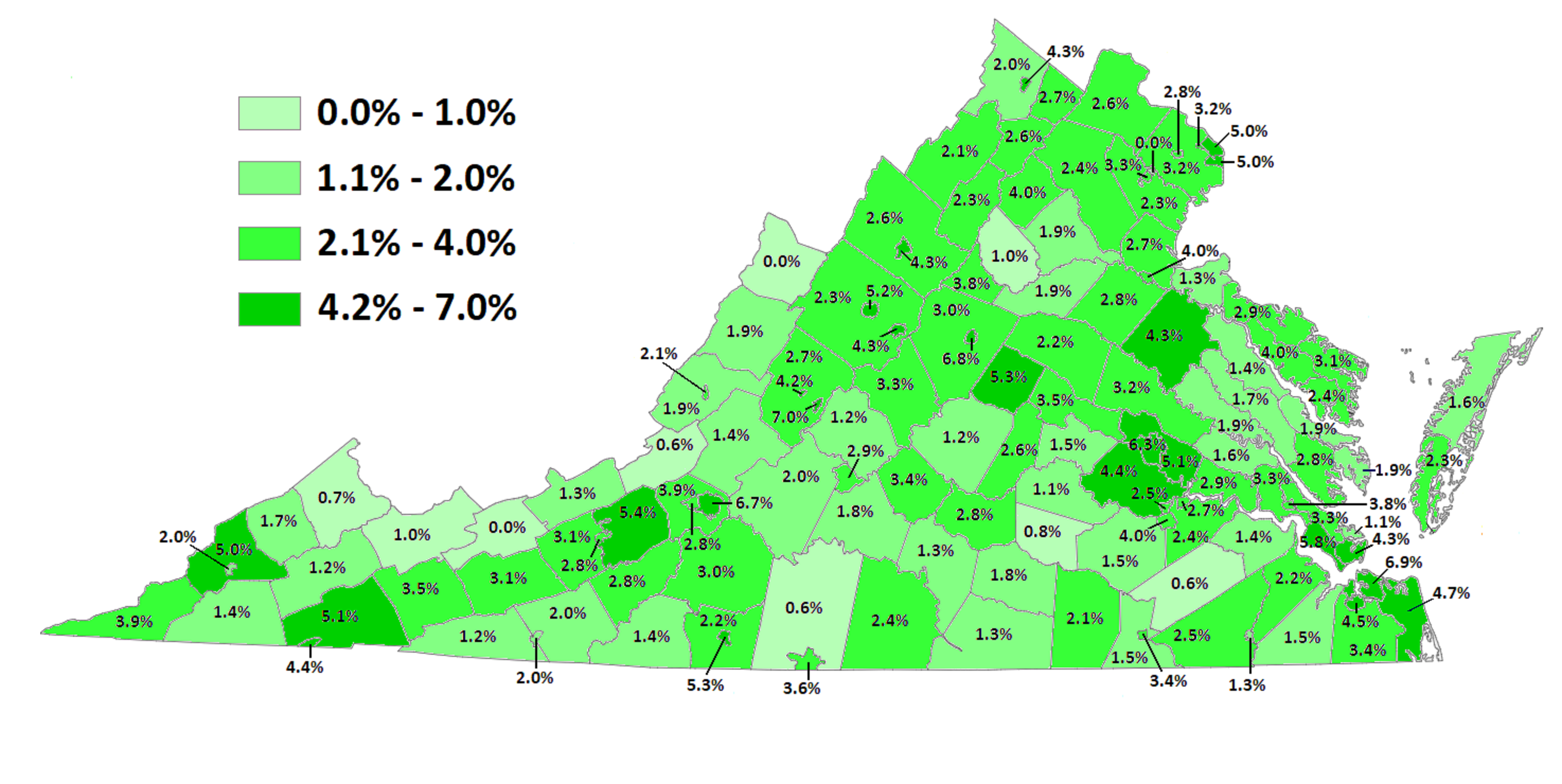
Percentage of same-sex marriages in Virginia's counties and independent cities, 2014–2018

Data from the 2000 U.S. census showed that 13,802 same-sex couples were living in Virginia. By 2005, this had increased to 19,673 couples, likely attributed to same-sex couples' growing willingness to disclose their partnerships on government surveys. Same-sex couples lived in all counties and independent cities of the state and constituted 0.9% of coupled households and 0.5% of all households in the state. Most couples lived in Fairfax County, Arlington County and Alexandria. Same-sex partners in Virginia were on average younger than opposite-sex partners, and significantly more likely to be employed. In addition, the average and median household incomes of same-sex couples were higher than different-sex couples, but same-sex couples were far less likely to own a home than opposite-sex partners. 20% of same-sex couples in Virginia were raising children under the age of 18, with an estimated 6,503 children living in households headed by same-sex couples in 2005.

In the approximately 10-month period subsequent to same-sex marriage becoming legal in Virginia (i.e. by August 2015), a total of 3,598 marriage licenses were issued to same-sex couples, representing 5.27% of all licenses issued in the state in that time. The three most popular localities for same-sex marriages were Norfolk, Virginia Beach and Richmond. Between 2014 and 2018, same-sex couples made up 11,360 of the 300,865 marriages performed in Virginia, or about 3.8%. Virginia Beach registered the most same-sex marriages of any locality at 1,155, followed by Norfolk at 849 and Richmond at 564. The localities with the highest share of same-sex marriages in comparison to heterosexual marriages were Buena Vista (where same-sex marriages accounted for 7.0% of all unions), Norfolk (6.9%), Charlottesville (6.8%), Roanoke (6.7%) and Richmond (6.3%). Conversely, Highland County, Bland County and Manassas Park registered no same-sex marriages at all. The 2020 U.S. census showed that there were 15,851 married same-sex couple households (6,957 male couples and 8,894 female couples) and 11,172 unmarried same-sex couple households in Virginia.

== Public opinion ==
Public opinion for same-sex marriage in Virginia
Poll source	Dates administered	Sample size	Margin of error	Support	Opposition	Do not know / refused
Public Religion Research Institute	February 28 – December 8, 2025	581 adults	?	68%	28%	4%
Public Religion Research Institute	March 13 – December 2, 2024	583 adults	?	68%	29%	3%
Public Religion Research Institute	March 9 – December 7, 2023	608 adults	?	71%	27%	2%
Public Religion Research Institute	March 11 – December 14, 2022	?	?	74%	24%	2%
Public Religion Research Institute	March 8 – November 9, 2021	?	?	71%	26%	3%
Public Religion Research Institute	January 7 – December 20, 2020	1,555 adults	?	69%	23%	8%
Public Religion Research Institute	April 5 – December 23, 2017	1,529 adults	?	60%	32%	8%
Public Religion Research Institute	May 18, 2016 – January 10, 2017	2,862 adults	?	57%	34%	9%
Public Religion Research Institute	April 29, 2015 – January 7, 2016	2,260 adults	?	49%	42%	9%
Public Religion Research Institute	April 2, 2014 – January 4, 2015	1,517 adults	?	50%	43%	7%
Quinnipiac University	March 19–24, 2014	1,288 voters	± 2.7%	50%	42%	8%
Public Religion Research Institute	November 12 – December 18, 2013	161 adults	± 9.0%	52%	42%	6%
Christopher Newport University	October 8–13, 2013	944 registered voters	± 3.2%	55%	36%	9%
Christopher Newport University	October 8–13, 2013	753 likely voters	± 3.6%	56%	36%	8%
Marist College	September 17–19, 2013	1,203 adults	± 2.8%	55%	37%	8%
Marist College	September 17–19, 2013	1,069 registered voters	± 3.0%	54%	38%	8%
Marist College	September 17–19, 2013	546 likely voters	± 4.2%	53%	39%	8%
Emerson College	August 23–28, 2013	653 registered voters	± 3.8%	38%	48%	14%
Quinnipiac University	July 11–15, 2013	1,030 registered voters	± 3.1%	50%	43%	7%
Greenberg Quinlan Rosner Research/Target Point Consulting	June 26–30, 2013	600 adults	± 4.9%	55%	41%	4%
The Washington Post	April 29 – May 2, 2013	1,000 adults	± 3.5%	56%	33%	11%
Public Policy Polling	December 10–12, 2011	600 voters	± 4.0%	34%	53%	13%
Public Policy Polling	July 21–24, 2011	500 voters	± 4.4%	35%	52%	13%
The Washington Post	April 28 – May 4, 2011	1,180 adults	± 3.5%	47%	43%	10%

The May 2011 poll for The Washington Post found that 47% of Virginia adults favored the legalization of same-sex marriage, while 43% opposed it and 10% had no opinion. It also found that 55% favored allowing same-sex couples to adopt children, while 35% opposed and 10% had no opinion. The same poll found that 64% of residents from Fairfax County, Arlington County, Alexandria and Fairfax supported same-sex marriage, as did 63% of residents from Manassas, Manassas Park and Winchester, and Loudoun, Prince William, Stafford, Fauquier, Culpeper, Madison, Rappahannock, Clarke and Frederick counties. Only 42% of the rest of Virginia supported same-sex marriage. The July 2011 Public Policy Polling (PPP) survey found that 35% of Virginia voters thought same-sex marriage should be legal, while 52% thought it should be illegal and 13% were not sure. A separate question on the same survey found that 65% of Virginia voters supported the legal recognition of same-sex couples, with 32% supporting same-sex marriage, 33% supporting civil unions but not marriage, 33% favoring no legal recognition and 2% being unsure. A separate question on the December 2011 PPP survey found that 59% of voters supported the legal recognition of same-sex couples, with 31% supporting same-sex marriage, 28% supporting civil unions but not marriage, 38% favoring no legal recognition and 3% being undecided.

The Greenberg Quinlan Rosner Research and TargetPoint Consulting poll conducted in June 2013 found that 55% of Virginians supported same-sex marriage. Among respondents below the age of 30, support was at 71%.

== See also ==
- LGBT rights in Virginia
- Same-sex marriage in the United States
- Loving v. Virginia
