= 2006 Virginia ballot measures =

The 2006 Virginia State Elections took place on Election Day, November 7, 2006, the same day as the U.S. House and the U.S. Senate elections in the state. The only statewide elections on the ballot were three constitutional referendums to amend the Virginia State Constitution. Because Virginia state elections are held on off-years, no statewide officers or state legislative elections were held. All referendums were referred to the voters by the Virginia General Assembly.

== Question 1 ==
The most controversial amendment on the ballot was the Marshall-Newman Amendment (named after the amendment's co-sponsors), which was also known as the "Virginia Marriage Amendment". This amendment defines civil marriage as solely between one man and one woman and bans state recognition of any other legal relationship status, such as a domestic partnership or a civil union. Voters were asked the following question:

"Shall Article I (the Bill of Rights) of the Constitution of Virginia be amended to state: "That only a union between one man and one woman may be a marriage valid in or recognized by this Commonwealth and its political subdivisions. This Commonwealth and its political subdivisions shall not create or recognize a legal status for relationships of unmarried individuals that intends to approximate the design, qualities, significance, or effects of marriage. Nor shall this Commonwealth or its political subdivisions create or recognize another union, partnership, or other legal status to which is assigned the rights, benefits, obligations, qualities, or effects of marriage.?"

Although the amendment was approved by 57.1% of the voters, it was later struck down for being unconstitutional by U.S. District Judge Arenda L. Wright Allen on February 13, 2014, in the case Bostic v. Schaefer. Her ruling was appealed to the Fourth Circuit Court of Appeals, which upheld her decision on July 28, 2014. The Supreme Court denied a writ of certiorari on October 6, 2014, which legalized same-sex marriage in Virginia.

Question 1
Choice	Votes	%
For	1,328,537	57.06
Against	999,687	42.94
Total	2,328,224	100.00
Source: - Official Results

== Question 2 ==
The amendment asked voters to delete an obsolete provision that prohibited the incorporation of churches which was ruled unconstitutional by the United States District Court for the Western District of Virginia in the case Falwell v. Miller in 2002. The amendment passed after being narrowly rejected in 1996.

Question 2
Choice	Votes	%
For	1,426,248	65.19
Against	761,632	34.81
Total	2,187,880	100.00
Source: - Official Results

== Question 3 ==
The Local Tax Exemption Amendment gives local communities that ability to allow partial exemptions from property taxes under certain circumstances. Voters were asked the following question:

"Shall Section 6 of Article X of the Constitution of Virginia be amended to authorize legislation to permit localities to provide a partial exemption from real property taxes for real estate with new structures and improvements in conservation, redevelopment, or rehabilitation areas?"

Question 3
Choice	Votes	%
For	1,425,143	64.77
Against	775,328	35.23
Total	2,200,471	100.00
Source: - Official Results
