= 1996 Virginia ballot measures =

The 1996 Virginia State Elections took place on Election Day, November 5, 1996, the same day as the presidential, U.S. Senate, and U.S. House elections in the state. The only statewide elections on the ballot were five constitutional referendums to amend the Virginia State Constitution. Because Virginia state elections are held on off-years, no statewide officers or state legislative elections were held. All referendums were referred to the voters by the Virginia General Assembly.

== Question 1 ==
This amendment asked voters to turn all state employees' investments in the government-controlled retirement fund system into trust fund accounts.

Question 1
Choice	Votes	%
For	1,717,244	83.13
Against	348,369	16.87
Total	2,065,613	100.00
Source: - Official Results

== Question 2 ==
The Victims' Rights Act amendment asked voters the following question:

"Shall the Constitution of Virginia be amended to provide that the victims of crime shall be treated with fairness, dignity, and respect in the criminal justice process and that the General Assembly may define, by law, the rights of victims of crime?"

Question 2
Choice	Votes	%
For	1,748,942	84.17
Against	328,995	15.83
Total	2,077,937	100.00
Source: - Official Results

== Question 3 ==
This amendment gives the General Assembly the right to appeal any case against the Commonwealth (which is normally done by the Attorney General of Virginia) as long as the appeal does not violate the Virginia State Constitution or the U.S. Constitution.

Question 3
Choice	Votes	%
For	1,423,167	70.41
Against	598,010	29.59
Total	2,021,177	100.00
Source: - Official Results

== Question 4 ==
This amendment adjusted voter registration laws in order to bring them into compliance with the National Voter Registration Act.

Question 4
Choice	Votes	%
For	1,498,496	73.98
Against	527,042	26.02
Total	2,025,538	100.00
Source: - Official Results

== Question 5 ==
This amendment would have removed language which prohibited the General Assembly from passing a law permitting incorporation of any church or religious organization. Although the amendment was narrowly rejected, the aforementioned language in the Virginia State Constitution was ruled unconstitutional by the United States District Court for the Western District of Virginia in the case Falwell v. Miller in 2002. The language was later removed by another amendment in 2006.

Question 5
Choice	Votes	%
For	979,833	49.09
Against	1,016,262	50.91
Total	1,996,095	100.00
Source: - Official Results
