= French Quarter Cafe v. Virginia Alcoholic Beverage Control Board =

French Quarter Cafe v. Virginia Alcoholic Beverage Control Board, 1:91-cv-01180 (1991) was a U.S. District Court for Eastern Virginia case in which the U.S. state of Virginia's longstanding ban on gay bars was declared unconstitutional.

== Background ==
In the state of Virginia, gay bars and bars employing and serving gays and lesbians were banned and subject to fines and or prosecution.

In 1934, the Board of the Virginia Alcoholic Beverage Control Authority (ABC) enacted regulations regarding the sale of alcoholic beverages in the state of Virginia. There were several regulations regarding homosexual patrons.

Section 4-37 of the regulation stated "a bar’s license may be suspended or revoked if the bar has become a meeting place and rendezvous for users of narcotics, drunks, homosexuals, prostitutes, pimps, panderers, gamblers or habitual law violators…"

Section 4-98 of the regulation prohibited "a licensee from employing any person who has the general reputation as a prostitute, homosexual, panderer, gambler, habitual law violator, person of ill repute, user of or peddler of narcotics, or person who drinks to excess or a 'B-girl'."

=== Protests ===
In 1969, several months before the Stonewall riots, several bars serving the gay community in Virginia were suspended and shut down due to the ABC regulations. During this period, local gay activists protested the enforcement and several letters to the editor were published in Virginia newspapers in protest of the laws.

Enforcement of the regulations reduced significantly in the 1970s and 1980s, in part due to local resistance from LGBT organizations in Virginia. In the late 1980s and early 1990s, LGBT advocacy organizations attempted to convince members of the Virginia General Assembly to rescind the regulations, but those efforts did not gain wide support from lawmakers.

== Case ==
In May 1991, an Alexandria business owner, Murray Greenberg, was seeking to open a new gay bar and restaurant in the city called the French Quarter Cafe.

In an attempt to prevent the restaurant from opening, a local resident, Colonel William Glasgow, Jr., contacted the ABC to seek enforcement of the 1930s regulations. In an interview with The Washington Post Glasgow stated that he was in favor of the regulations to "protect family life" and described homosexuality in public places as "a pathway to anarchy."

Due to Glasgow's complaint, the French Quarter Cafe was visited by three officials with the Virginia ABC who told Greenberg that they might "reluctantly have to" enforce the 1934 laws.

On August 28, 1991, Greenberg, in his capacity at the owner of the French Quarter Cafe, filed a lawsuit in federal district court in Alexandria against the Virginia Alcoholic Beverage Control Board and its members. Joining Greenberg in the lawsuit as co-plaintiffs were the College of William and Mary Gay and Lesbian Alumni (W&M GALA) group, and Montgomery County lesbian activist Dale Barnhard. The defendants named were the three members of the Virginia Alcoholic Beverage Control Board, including chairman George M. Hampton Sr.

Barnhard joined the lawsuit because she and a female companion had been asked to leave a "straight" dance club in Virginia because the owners were afraid of losing their liquor license due to the ABC regulation. The W&M GALA group joined the lawsuit because they had faced challenges with a request to rent a Virginia hotel suite for an organization event.

The plaintiffs' legal fees were supported in part by Virginians for Justice, an LGBT political advocacy group. Greenberg's lawsuit was also publicly supported by the National Gay and Lesbian Task force, who stated that "gay people should be able to go anywhere and spend their hard-earned gay income without the intrusion of homophobic state laws."

During the lawsuit, Virginia Governor Douglas Wilder refused to comment on the case or take a position on the ABC regulations, a move that was criticized by LGBT groups in the state.

=== Ruling ===
On October 23, 1991, US District Judge Albert V. Bryan Jr. declared the anti-gay ABC regulations unconstitutional and void and signed an order preventing Virginia ABC agents from enforcing them. Judge Bryan also required that the ABC board notify all current liquor license holders in the state (and any future applicants) of the changes in the ABC regulations. Additionally, the ABC board was ordered to pay the full court costs for the plaintiffs, totaling close to $11,000.

== Aftermath and significance ==
At the time of the court ruling, Virginians for Justice stated that it was a "victory that will help invigorate our movement and the fight for equal justice. The Commonwealth of Virginia can no longer assume that gays and lesbians are unable to organize to protect themselves from bad laws whether they are on the books or under consideration."

After the victory in court, Greenberg invited the Washington area LGBT community to a cafe for a "Victory in Virginia Day" celebration. The bar closed in 1994.
