= Chris Jones (Virginia politician) =

American politician (born 1958)

Member of the Virginia House of Delegates from the 76th district
- In office January 14, 1998 – January 8, 2020
- Preceded by: Robert Nelms
- Succeeded by: Clint Jenkins

Personal details
- Born: Steven Christopher Jones; June 23, 1958 (age 68) Suffolk, Virginia, U.S.
- Party: Republican
- Spouse: Karen Hope Harrison
- Children: Kaitlin
- Education: Randolph-Macon College; Medical College of Virginia
- Profession: Pharmacist
- Committees: General Laws (chair); Appropriations; Privileges and Elections

Steven Christopher Jones (born June 23, 1958, in Suffolk, Virginia) is a former Republican politician from the Commonwealth of Virginia. He was elected to Suffolk City Council in 1986 and later to the office of Mayor in 1992 at the age of 36. He is believed to be the youngest Mayor in the history of Suffolk. He was elected to the Virginia House of Delegates in November 1997. He represented the 76th district, made up of parts of the cities of Suffolk and Chesapeake. From 2014 until 2019, he chaired the House Appropriations Committee. One of the chief architects of the 2011 redistricting plan that the US Supreme Court ruled in 2019 was unconstitutionally gerrymandered, he lost re-election in November 2019 after his district was redrawn.
