= Lawrence D. Wilder Jr. =

American politician

Larry Wilder

Member of the Virginia House of Delegates from the 70th district
- In office May 1992 – January 12, 1994
- Preceded by: Roland J. Ealey
- Succeeded by: Dwight C. Jones

Personal details
- Born: Lawrence Douglas Wilder Jr. February 17, 1962 (age 64) Richmond, Virginia, U.S.
- Party: Democratic
- Parent: Douglas Wilder (father)
- Education: University of Virginia (BA, JD); University of Southern California (MBA)
- Occupation: Lawyer; politician

Lawrence Douglas Wilder Jr. (born February 17, 1962) is a former member of the Virginia House of Delegates from Richmond. He is the son of former Virginia governor L. Douglas Wilder.

== Life ==
In 1989, Wilder served as the treasurer for his father's 1989 gubernatorial campaign. In 2007, he pleaded guilty to unlawful and willful neglect of duty in that role and unlawfully and willingly failing to file a full and accurate campaign committee report to the State Board of Elections. This was due to a failure to account for over $170,000 in funds, as well as a false 1999 campaign report. He was fined $2,500, as well as an additional suspended $2,000, for each count. In addition, he received a 12-month suspended sentence of jail time for each charge. His attorney said that a drug problem that he was experiencing between 1992 and 1999 was a contributing factor, as it put him out of touch with his normal moral values. In 2000, he also pleaded guilty to a federal drugs charge. Richmond Commonwealth's Attorney argued at the time of the elections that Wilder Sr. was actually responsible, and that Wilder Jr. was simply taking the fall.

Wilder was elected in May 1992 to the Virginia House of Delegates following the death of Roland J. Ealey. He left the House two years later, in 1994. Since then, as of 2024, he has mostly worked in state governance, and currently works in the Department of Small Business and Supplier Diversity. He is unmarried and without children.
