= 2006 Virginia Question 1 =

Amendment to the Constitution of Virginia

Question 1
- November 7, 2006
- Virginia Marriage Amendment

Results
Choice	Votes	%
Yes	1,328,537	57.06%
No	999,687	42.94%
Valid votes	2,328,224	97.07%
Invalid or blank votes	70,365	2.93%
Total votes	2,398,589	100.00%
Registered voters/turnout	4,554,683	51.12%

Yes: 50–60% 60–70% 70–80% 80–90% 90%+
No: 50–60% 60–70% 70–80% 80–90%
Tie: 50%

2006 Virginia Question 1, the Marshall-Newman Amendment (also referred to as the Virginia Marriage Amendment) is an amendment to the Constitution of Virginia that defines marriage as solely between one man and one woman and bans recognition of any legal status "approximat[ing] the design, qualities, significance, or effects of marriage". The amendment was ratified by 57% of the voters on November 7, 2006. It became part of the state Constitution as Section 15-A of Article 1. In 2014, the amendment was ruled unconstitutional in Bostic v. Schaefer. Virginians voted to repeal the amendment in 2026.

== Text ==
The text of the amendment states:

Only a union between one man and one woman may be a marriage valid in or recognized by this Commonwealth and its political subdivisions. This Commonwealth and its political subdivisions shall not create or recognize a legal status for relationships of unmarried individuals that intends to approximate the design, qualities, significance, or effects of marriage. Nor shall this Commonwealth or its political subdivisions create or recognize another union, partnership, or other legal status to which is assigned the rights, benefits, obligations, qualities, or effects of marriage.

== Enactment ==
=== Legislative process ===
The Virginia Constitution requires amendments to be passed in two different sessions separated by a general election. The amendment, named after Delegate Bob Marshall and Senator Stephen Newman, was approved by the Virginia General Assembly in the 2005 and 2006 sessions, which were separated by the November 2005 general election. It was thus put on the November 2006 election ballot for approval by voters.

=== Voting results ===
Amendment 1
Choice	Votes	%
For	1,328,537	57.06
Against	999,687	42.94
Total	2,328,224	100.00
Registered voters/turnout		52.66
Source: - Official Results

== Criticism ==
The far-reaching nature of the Marshall-Newman Amendment intended to reinforce its Marriage Affirmation Act has attracted criticism. Writing in The Washington Post, Jonathan Rauch argued that:

Virginia appears to abridge gay individuals' right to enter into private contracts with each other. On its face, the law could interfere with wills, medical directives, powers of attorney, child custody and property arrangements, even perhaps joint bank accounts. If a gay Californian was hit by a bus in Arlington, her medical power of attorney might be worthless there.

Virginia Attorney General Bob McDonnell issued a 2006 opinion stating that the amendment does not change the legal status of documents such as contracts, wills, or advance health care directives between unmarried people.

== Ruling of unconstitutionality ==
On February 13, 2014, U.S. District Judge Arenda Wright Allen of the Eastern District of Virginia in Norfolk ruled that the amendment was unconstitutional, and ordered Virginia not to enforce it against same-sex couples. In her opinion, Judge Allen granted a stay pending appeal.

On July 28, 2014, the Fourth Circuit Court of Appeals issued a 2–1 opinion upholding the lower court's decision, although this was also appealed.

On October 6, 2014, the Supreme Court of the United States denied a writ of certiorari and thus let the Fourth Circuit Court's decision stand, which legalized same-sex marriage in Virginia.

Since the Supreme Court's decision in Obergefell v. Hodges on June 26, 2015, all such bans throughout the United States are unconstitutional.

== Repeal attempts ==
Although the amendment is unconstitutional and unenforceable since 2014, it remains part of the Virginia Constitution. Legislators, including State Senator Adam Ebbin (D) and Delegate Mark Sickles (D), have introduced bills in 2015 and 2016 aiming to repeal the amendment. Ebbin prefiled another bill to repeal the amendment on November 18, 2019, which the Senate voted to continue in 2021.

House Joint Resolution No. 9, which replaces the Marshall-Newman Amendment with text banning marriage discrimination based on sex, gender, or race passed the Virginia House of Delegates and Virginia Senate in 2025. On November 3, 2026, Virginia voters approved the referendum to repeal the Marshall-Newman Amendment. The new constitutional language prohibits the state from denying a marriage license based on sex, gender, or race, making Virginia the first Southern state to enshrine such protections in its constitution.

== Pre-decision opinion polls ==
Date of opinion poll	Conducted by	Sample size	In favor	Against	Undecided	Margin	Margin of Error	Source
October 2006	Mason-Dixon Polling & Strategy	?	52%	42%	?	10% pro	?	
October 10–12, 2006	The Washington Post	1,004 randomly selected likely voters	48%	47%		1% pro	±3%	
October 10–12, 2006	The Washington Post	1,004 randomly selected likely voters	53%	43%		10% pro	±3%	

== See also ==
- Same-sex marriage in Virginia
- LGBT rights in Virginia
- Loving v. Virginia
