= R. Kirk McPike =

American politician (born 1977)

Member of the Virginia House of Delegates from the 5th district
- Incumbent
- Assumed office February 18, 2026
- Preceded by: Elizabeth Bennett-Parker

Alexandria City Council
- In office 2021–2026

Personal details
- Born: 1977 (age 48–49) Dallas, Texas, U.S.
- Party: Democratic
- Spouse: Jason R. Kaufman
- Education: Southern Methodist University (BA)
- Website: kirkmcpike.com

Richard Kirk McPike (born 1977) is an American politician and Delegate for the 5th district of the Virginia House of Delegates following a 2026 special election. McPike also served on the Alexandria City Council from 2021 to 2026 and worked as a chief of staff for California U.S. House representative Mark Takano from 2008 to 2026.

== Early life and education ==
McPike was born in Dallas, Texas, in 1977. He graduated from Southern Methodist University in 2005 with a bachelor's degree in political science.

== Career ==
=== Early career and Alexandria City Council ===
In 2005, McPike began working as a field director for the Dallas County, Texas Democratic Party. He served on the reelection campaign for sheriff Lupe Valdez. McPike began working as chief of staff for California United States House representative Mark Takano circa 2008. In 2010, McPike moved to Alexandria, Virginia to work for Adam Ebbin's campaign for Virginia Senate. In 2011, McPike joined the Alexandria Democratic Committee. In 2017, he was appointed to the Alexandria Budget and Fiscal Affairs Advisory Commission. During the January 6 United States Capitol attack, McPike and Takano took shelter in the United States Capitol.

He was elected to the Alexandria City Council in 2021 and was reelected in 2025.

=== Virginia House of Delegates ===
In February 2026, he won a special election for the 5th district of the Virginia House of Delegates. After winning the election, he resigned from his roles on the Alexandria City Council and as chief of staff for Takano. McPike was sworn in to the Virginia House of Delegates on February 18, 2026.

McPike served as co-chair of a campaign in support of 2026 Virginia Question 2, which would amend the constitution to codify same-sex and interracial marriage.

== Personal life ==
McPike is gay. McPike and his husband married in 2019 in Pentagon City. As of 2026, he lives in the Seminary Hill neighborhood of Alexandria, Virginia with his husband. He is an Episcopalian.
