= Virginia's 70th House of Delegates district =

Virginia legislative district

District map from the 2023 election

Virginia's 70th House of Delegates district elects one of 100 seats in the Virginia House of Delegates, the lower house of the state's bicameral legislature. District 70, in Henrico County, Chesterfield County, and Richmond, Virginia, has been represented by Democrat Delores McQuinn since 2010. In the 2017 election, she faced a primary challenge from Alex Mejias.

== District officeholders ==
Years	Delegate	Party	Electoral history
January 12, 1983 – March 23, 1992	Roland J. Ealey	Democratic	First delegate of district; Died while in office
May 1992 – January 12, 1994	Lawrence D. Wilder Jr.	Democratic	Resigned after announcing retirement
January 12, 1994 – January 8, 2009	Dwight Clinton Jones	Democratic	Declined to seek reelection; Elected Mayor of Richmond, Virginia
January 8, 2009 – present	Delores McQuinn	Democratic	First elected in 2008
