= Susan Swecker =

American public affairs consultant

Chair of the Virginia Democratic Party
- In office June 28, 2015 – March 22, 2025
- Preceded by: Dwight Clinton Jones
- Succeeded by: Lamont Bagby

Personal details
- Born: Susan Reid Swecker; March 14, 1955 (age 70); Highland County, Virginia, U.S.
- Political party: Democratic
- Education: Virginia Tech; Mary Baldwin University (BA); Washington and Lee University (JD)

Susan Reid Swecker (born March 14, 1955) is an American public affairs consultant who served as the chair of the Democratic Party of Virginia from 2015 to 2025. She was chairwoman of the Virginia Alcoholic Beverage Control Board.

== Early life and education ==
Swecker was born and raised on a farm in Highland County, Virginia. She grew up in Stuarts Draft, Virginia. She volunteered in the Jimmy Carter 1976 presidential campaign. Swecker served as chairman of the democratic party of Highland County for six months. She attended Virginia Tech and earned her B.A. in political science from Mary Baldwin University in 1977. She completed a Juris Doctor degree at the Washington and Lee University School of Law.

== Career ==
She began working as a legislative aide for state senator Frank W. Nolen following his special election win in 1977. In January 1978, Swecker conducted her first visit to the Virginia General Assembly. She worked on the 1978 U.S. senate campaign of Andrew Miller. She moved to Blue Ridge, Virginia in 1978. In 1980, she was a field operations assistant with the United States Census Bureau where she supervised crew leaders and enumerators. The position ended in mid-June. In June 1981, she was elected first vice president of the Blue Ridge Democratic Women's Club. On December 3, 1981, Swecker, a member of the Augusta County Democratic Committee, was elected to serve a two-year term as its chair. From 1986 to 1988, she was the executive director of the Democratic Party of Virginia. She served as chairwoman of the Democratic National Committee's southern caucus. In 1992, Swecker served as the campaign manager of Steve Musselwhite, a first-time candidate for Virginia's 6th congressional district.

In 2000, Swecker was chairwoman of the Virginia delegation to the Democratic National Convention. She successfully lobbied the Virginia General Assembly for the 2004 Virginia Democratic presidential primary to occur in February, prompting visits by its candidates. She was the state director of the John Kerry 2004 presidential campaign.

Swecker was chairwoman of the Virginia Alcoholic Beverage Control Board. In 2013, she served on the transition team of Virginia governor Terry McAuliffe. She was a member of the Democratic National Committee. In 2015, she was elected as chair of the Democratic Party of Virginia, succeeding Dwight Clinton Jones. In 2022, she was reelected as party chair. During her tenure, the party expanded from four full-time staff and an annual operating budget of under US$1 million to 15 unionized full-time staff members and a budget of over US$3 million. She is a public affairs consultant and the president of Dividing Waters Public Affairs LLC.

Party political offices
Preceded by Dwight Clinton Jones	Chair of the Virginia Democratic Party; 2015–2025	Succeeded by Lamont Bagby
