= Virginia's 76th House of Delegates district =

Virginia legislative district

District map from the 2023 election

The Virginia's 76th House of Delegates district elects one of 100 seats in the Virginia House of Delegates, the lower house of the state's bicameral legislature. District 76 is currently represented by Debra Gardner.

== District officeholders ==
Years	Delegate	Party	Electoral history
January 12, 1983 – January 8, 1992	Sam Glasscock	Democratic	Lost reelection
January 8, 1992 – January 14, 1998	Robert Nelms	Republican	
January 14, 1998 – January 8, 2020	Chris Jones	Republican	Lost reelection
January 8, 2020 – present	Clint Jenkins	Democratic	First elected in 2019
