= Roland J. Ealey =

American politician

Member of the Virginia House of Delegates from the 70th district
- In office January 12, 1983 – March 23, 1992
- Preceded by: None (district created)
- Succeeded by: Lawrence D. Wilder Jr.

Personal details
- Born: Roland J. Ealey; June 20, 1914 Kershaw, South Carolina, U.S.
- Died: March 23, 1992 (aged 77) Richmond, Virginia, U.S.
- Party: Democratic
- Spouse: Bessie Mae Binford
- Education: Virginia Union University (BA); Howard University (LLB)

Roland J. "Duke" Ealey (June 20, 1914 – March 23, 1992) was an American civil rights attorney and politician who served in the Virginia House of Delegates from 1983 until his death in 1992. A prominent figure in Richmond's legal community, Ealey argued the landmark United States Supreme Court case Johnson v. Virginia, 373 U.S. 61 (1963), which struck down racial segregation in courtrooms throughout the United States. Over a career spanning more than five decades, he was involved in several major civil rights cases and served on the legal staff of the NAACP.

In 2004, the House of Delegates designated June 20 as "Delegate Roland J. Ealey Day" in Virginia.

== Early life and education ==
Ealey was born on June 20, 1914, in Kershaw, South Carolina. His family relocated to Richmond, Virginia, in 1915. Although he spent part of his youth in the public schools of Pittsburgh, Pennsylvania, he returned to Richmond and graduated from Armstrong High School as president of the Class of 1932. He earned a Bachelor of Arts degree from Virginia Union University in Richmond in 1936 and a law degree from Howard University School of Law in 1939.

== Legal career ==
=== Early practice and the NAACP ===
Upon his admission to the Virginia State Bar in 1940, Ealey co-founded the law firm of Ealey and Page in Richmond. He was among the group of Black attorneys in Virginia who organized the Old Dominion Bar Association in 1941, alongside Oliver W. Hill Sr., Martin A. Martin, and others. He later served as a founder and president of its Richmond chapter.

Before entering military service, Ealey taught law at the Lincoln University School of Law in St. Louis, Missouri. He served in the United States Army as a first sergeant during World War II in the Mid-Pacific Theatre of Operations from 1943 to 1946. After the war, he resumed the practice of law in Richmond and became active in the civil rights movement, frequently providing legal services pro bono.

Ealey served on the legal staff of the NAACP Virginia State Conference. He was also in private practice with the firm Palmer & Ealey. His contemporaries in the Virginia civil rights legal community included Oliver W. Hill Sr., Spottswood W. Robinson III, Martin A. Martin, Samuel W. Tucker, and Henry L. Marsh III.
