= 1996 United States House of Representatives elections in Virginia =

- November 5, 1996

All 11 Virginia seats to the United States House of Representatives
	Majority party	Minority party
Party	Democratic	Republican
Last election	6	5
Seats won	6	5
Seat change	Steady	Steady
Popular vote	1,027,020	1,117,187
Percentage	46.70%	50.80%
Swing	▲7.27%	▼6.28%

Democratic
40–50%
50–60%
60–70%
70–80%
80–90%
90–100%
Republican
40–50%
50–60%
60–70%
70–80%
80–90%
90–100%

The 1996 United States House of Representatives elections in Virginia were held on November 5, 1996, to determine who will represent the Commonwealth of Virginia in the United States House of Representatives. Virginia has eleven seats in the House, apportioned according to the 1990 United States census. Representatives are elected for two-year terms.

== Overview ==
United States House of Representatives elections in Virginia, 1996
Party	Votes	Percentage	Seats	+/–
Republican	1,117,187	50.80%	5	-
Democratic	1,027,020	46.70%	6	-
Reform	20,950	0.95%	0	-
Independents/Write-ins	33,940	1.54%	0	-
Totals	2,199,097	100.00%	11	—

== See also ==
- United States House elections, 1996
