= Virginia Alcoholic Beverage Control Board =

The Virginia Alcoholic Beverage Control Board is a three-person board that oversees the Virginia Alcoholic Beverage Control Authority. The Board consists of a chairperson and two commissioners who direct all agency operations. Board members are full-time state employees appointed by the Governor of Virginia.

The Board is vested with the power to control the possession, sale, transportation and delivery of alcoholic beverages within the Commonwealth, and to establish and operate stores for the sale of distilled spirits. These powers are granted to the Board as a unit, not to any individual member. The Board has authorized Virginia ABC's chief operating officer to manage day-to-day operations at the agency.

Virginia ABC Board members serve as administrative law judges for appeal hearings related to disciplinary matters involving licensees, contested ABC license applications and matters involving the beer and wine franchise acts. In this role, they conduct hearings, issue subpoenas requiring attendance of witnesses and the production of records, administer oaths and hear testimony.

The Board's authority includes final approval for executing leases, listing products for sale in ABC stores, submitting fund requests for agency appropriations and forecasting financial performance. It is required to submit an annual report to the Governor and General Assembly as well as submit a wine liter and malt beverage tax collections report to the Chairman of the House Appropriations Committee, Senate Finance Committee and the Virginia Wine Board each year.

== See also ==
- Susan Swecker, former chairwoman
