= Virginia's 16th House of Delegates district =

Virginia legislative district

Virginia's 16th State House of Delegates district
- District map from the 2023 election
Delegate
Paul Krizek; D–Mount Vernon
since January 10, 2024
- Demographics: 44% White; 18% Black; 28% Hispanic; 7% Asian; 1% Other; 3% Multiracial
- Population (2023) • Voting age: 85,706; 18
- Registered voters (2024): 54,702

Virginia's 16th House of Delegates district elects one of 100 seats in the Virginia House of Delegates, the lower house of the state's bicameral legislature. District 16 represents parts of Fairfax County. The seat is currently held by Paul Krizek.

== District officeholders ==
Years	Delegate	Party	Electoral history
January 12, 1983 – January 9, 2002	Chip Woodrum	Democratic	District was redistricted; declined to seek reelection
January 9, 2002 – January 9, 2008	Robert Hurt	Republican	Declined to seek reelection; Elected to the State Senate of Virginia
January 9, 2008 – January 8, 2014	Donald Merricks	Republican	Declined to seek reelection
January 8, 2014 – January 10, 2024	Les Adams	Republican	First elected in 2013; resigned effective January 10, 2024
January 10, 2024 – present	Paul Krizek	Democratic	Redistricted from the 44th District

== Electoral history ==
Date	Election	Candidate	Party	Votes	%
Virginia House of Delegates, 16th district
Nov 6, 2001	General	R. Hurt	Republican	11,853	65.0
Nov 6, 2001	General	R. W. Collins	Democratic	6,382	35.0
Nov 6, 2001	General	Write Ins		2	0
Nov 4, 2003	General	R. Hurt	Republican	8,744	61.6
Nov 4, 2003	General	K. Reynolds, Jr	Democratic	5,441	38.4
Nov 8, 2005	General	R. Hurt	Republican	12,821	99.0
Nov 8, 2005	General	Write Ins		123	1
Nov 6, 2007	General	Donald W. Merricks	Republican	10,744	64.00
Nov 6, 2007	General	G. Andy Parker	Democratic	6,034	35.94
Nov 6, 2007	General	Write Ins		9	0.05
Nov 6, 2007	General	Robert Hurt retired to run for state senate; seat stayed Republican			
Nov 3, 2009	General	Donald W. Merricks	Republican	13,074	99.50
Nov 3, 2009	General	Write Ins		65	0.49
Nov 8, 2011	General	Donald W. Merricks	Republican	14,343	99.06
Nov 8, 2011	General	Write Ins		135	0.93
Nov 5, 2013	General	Leslie Ray Adams	Republican	13,292	63.1
Nov 5, 2013	General	Elizabeth Jackson Jones	Democratic	7,740	36.7
Nov 5, 2013	General	Write Ins		43	0.2
Nov 3, 2015	General	Leslie Ray Adams	Republican	12,538	98.1
Nov 3, 2015	General	Write Ins		237	1.9
Nov 7, 2017	General	Leslie Ray Adams	Republican	16,513	96.1
Nov 7, 2017	General	Write Ins		668	3.9
Nov 5, 2019	General	Leslie Ray Adams	Republican	13,146	74.6
Nov 5, 2019	General	Dustin Wilson Evans	Libertarian	4,402	25.0
Nov 5, 2019	General	Write Ins		83	0.5
Nov 2, 2021	General	Leslie Ray Adams	Republican	19,412	69.9
Nov 2, 2021	General	Chance Brian Trevillian	Democratic	8,308	29.9
Nov 2, 2021	General	Write Ins		35	0.1
Nov 7, 2023	General	Paul E. Krizek	Democratic	16,985	90.6
Nov 7, 2023	General	Write Ins		1,760	9.4
