= Clint Jenkins =

Virginia house of representatives member

Member of the Virginia House of Delegates from the 76th district
- In office January 8, 2020 – January 10, 2024
- Preceded by: Chris Jones
- Succeeded by: Debra Gardner (redistricting)

Personal details
- Born: Philadelphia, Pennsylvania
- Party: Democratic
- Spouse: Karen Lynette Jenkins
- Children: 5

Clinton L. Jenkins is an American politician. A Democrat, he was a member of the Virginia House of Delegates, representing the 76th district from 2020 to 2024.

== Biography ==
A native of the district, Jenkins was raised in Suffolk, Virginia. He is an army veteran, manages a real estate company, and is the chairman of the Democratic party for Virginia's 3rd congressional district.

== Political career ==
=== 2019 ===
In the 2019 Virginia House of Delegates election, Jenkins challenged incumbent Republican Chris Jones, a pharmacist and chairman of the House Appropriations committee who had represented the district since 1998. Redistricting in 2019 shifted the demographics of the district, causing a Democratic majority. Both candidates ran unopposed in their primaries. Jenkins won with 56.3% of the vote.

=== 2020 ===
Jenkins was an elector for Joe Biden and Kamala Harris in Virginia's 2020 election for U.S. president.

=== 2021 ===
In the 2021 Virginia House of Delegates election, Jenkins won re-election, defeating Republican Michael Dillender and Independent Craig Warren with 53.3% of the vote.

=== 2023 ===
In 2022, Jenkins announced a run for the newly redrawn 17th district in the 2023 Virginia Senate election. He was defeated in the general election by Republican Emily Brewer.

== Controversies ==
On three occasions, Jenkins was charged with domestic violence against his wife and daughter, including one charge of attempting to choke his daughter. He was not convicted.
