= Debra Gardner =

American politician from Virginia

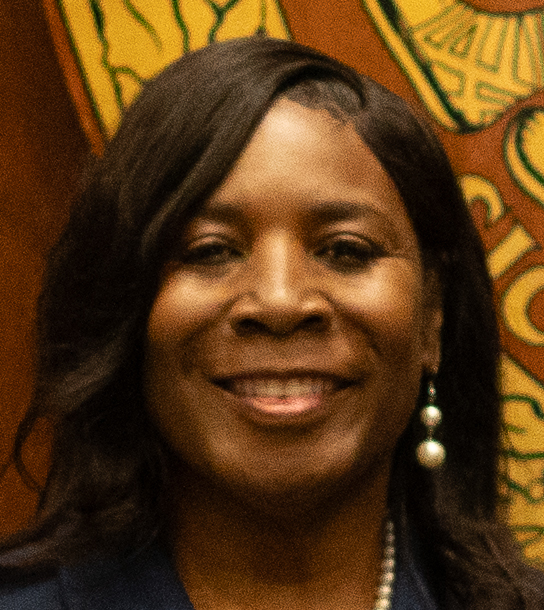
- Gardner in 2024

Member of the Virginia House of Delegates from the 76th district
- Incumbent
- Assumed office January 10, 2024
- Preceded by: Clint Jenkins (redistricting)

Personal details
- Born: 1956 (age 69–70) Shelby, North Carolina, U.S.
- Party: Democratic
- Education: North Carolina Central University (BA); Virginia Commonwealth University (MPA)
- Website: Campaign website Legislature website

Debra Darlene Gardner (born 1956) is an American politician and former social worker serving as a member of the Virginia House of Delegates from the 76th district. A Democrat, she was first elected in 2023

== Early life and education ==
Gardner was born in Shelby, North Carolina, and graduated from Shelby High School. She earned a Bachelor of Arts in sociology from North Carolina Central University and a Master of Public Administration from Virginia Commonwealth University.

== Career ==
Gardner worked as a social worker for 7 years then as executive director of the Commission on Virginia Alcohol Safety Action Program and as chief deputy director of the Virginia Department of Corrections. In 2014, mayor Dwight Clinton Jones selected Gardner to oversee the city of Richmond’s Department of Social Services, Justice Services and Parks, Recreation and Community Facilities. She was dismissed from the role after a shakeup when Levar Stoney took office, and went on to found consulting firm D2G-Coaching, which focuses on executive training and social work.

In 2019, she ran for the Chesterfield County board of supervisors in the Clover Hill District, but was narrowly defeated by incumbent Republican Chris Winslow.

== Virginia House of Delegates ==
=== 2021 campaign ===
Gardner first ran for the Virginia House of Delegates in 2021, challenging incumbent Republican Roxann Robinson in the 27th district. Robinson's campaign was accused of regularly darkening Gardner's skin in advertisements and portraying her as a marionette resembling a minstrel show in one spot, with Gardner saying "They made me look like [blackface singer] Al Jolson!" Joe Biden and Barack Obama endorsed her campaign. The Virginia Public Access Project listed the race as one of the year's most competitive. She was narrowly defeated in the general election by Robinson.

=== 2023 campaign ===
In 2023, Gardner ran again in the new 76th district, an open seat in Chesterfield County. She defeated Republican candidate Duc Truong in the general election.

=== Tenure ===
In 2024, Glenn Youngkin vetoed Gardner's legislation which would have established a working group within the Virginia Department of Labor and Industry to study options to increase wages for tipped employees who receive the minimum wage, study instances of wage theft and inequality, as well as to amend the penalties employers faced for wage violations.

== Personal life ==
Gardner is a Baptist and has a daughter, Katia. She has lived in Chesterfield County, Virginia for over 30 years as of 2024.

== Electoral history ==
=== 2019 ===
Chesterfield County Board of Supervisors Clover Hill District election, 2019
Party	Candidate	Votes	%
Republican	Chris Winslow	12,649	50.7
Democratic	Debra Gardner	12,251	49.1
Write-in		46	0.2
Total votes		24,946	100.0
Republican hold			

=== 2021 ===
Virginia's 27th House of Delegates district, 2021
Party	Candidate	Votes	%
Republican	Roxann Robinson (incumbent)	19,047	51.7
Democratic	Debra Gardner	17,714	48.1
Write-in		79	0.2
Total votes		36,840	100.0
Republican hold			

=== 2023 ===
Virginia's 76th House of Delegates District, 2023 general election
Party	Candidate	Votes	%
Democratic	Debra Gardner	14,541	63.68
Republican	Duc Truong	8,185	35.84
Write-in		110	0.48
Total votes		22,836	100
Democratic win (new seat)			
