= Dwight Clinton Jones =

American politician and pastor

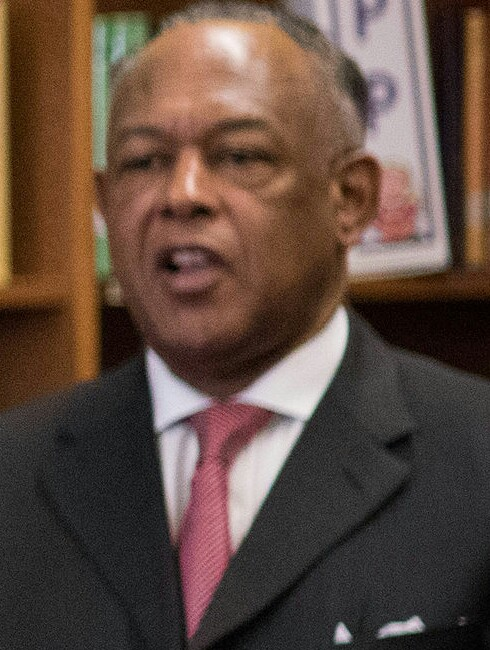

79th Mayor of Richmond
- In office January 1, 2009 – December 31, 2016
- Preceded by: Douglas Wilder
- Succeeded by: Levar Stoney

Chair of the Democratic Party of Virginia
- In office March 15, 2014 – June 27, 2015
- Preceded by: Charniele Herring
- Succeeded by: Susan Swecker

Member of the Virginia House of Delegates from the 70th district
- In office January 12, 1994 – January 1, 2009
- Preceded by: Lawrence D. Wilder Jr.
- Succeeded by: Delores McQuinn

Personal details
- Born: Dwight Clinton Jones; February 3, 1948 (age 78) Philadelphia, Pennsylvania, U.S.
- Party: Democratic
- Children: 3
- Education: Virginia Union University; United Theological Seminary
- Profession: Minister

Dwight Clinton Jones (born February 3, 1948) is an American politician and pastor who served as the 79th Mayor of Richmond, Virginia. Jones took office on January 1, 2009, was inaugurated for his second term on January 12, 2013, and was succeeded by Levar Stoney on December 31, 2016. Jones is a member of the Democratic Party, and was elected chairman of the Democratic Party of Virginia on March 15, 2014.

== Background and personal life ==
Jones was born in Philadelphia and moved to Richmond, Virginia after attending Virginia Union University, which awarded him Master of Divinity degree (1973), and earlier a Bachelor of Science degree (1970). He earned his Doctorate from United Theological Seminary in Dayton, Ohio. He is married and has three children, Dwight, Derik, and Nichole.

== Career ==
A Baptist, Jones is senior pastor of the First Baptist Church of South Richmond.

== Political career ==
Jones served as a member of the Richmond City School Board in 1979, and as its chairman from 1982-1985. In 1993, Jones was elected to the Virginia House of Delegates (a part time position), and represented the 70th District (which included Richmond at the time) from 1994 until declining to seek re-election in 2008.

== Mayor of Richmond ==
Jones took office as Richmond's 79th mayor on January 1, 2009. During his tenure, four new schools were built: Broad Rock Elementary, Oak Grove-Bellemeade Elementary, Martin Luther King, Jr. Middle School, and Huguenot High School, which is the first high school built in the City of Richmond in 40 years.

Other new public works included a new fire station (Fire Station 17) completed in 2012, which was the first built by the City of Richmond in 18 years. It replaced a fire station built in 1917, which was designed for horse-drawn equipment. A new Richmond City Jail was also built, and opened in July 2014 under capacity. The replaced jail (built in the 1960s), had multiple overcrowding, maintenance and safety issues.

During his last year in office, several agencies investigated the relationship between Jones' church (building a new structure in Chesterfield County) and the Richmond Department of Public Works and other agencies, particularly as about 10% of city employees were members of his congregation, but after the election, Richmond's Commonwealth's Attorney, Mike Herring, issued a report detailing laxities but declining to prosecute. Immediately before leaving office, Jones authorized significant severance packages for four high-level appointees.

== Notes ==
Political offices
Preceded by Douglas Wilder	Mayor of Richmond; 2009–present	Succeeded by Levar Stoney
