= Virginia Alcoholic Beverage Control Authority =

State agency that sells and regulates alcoholic beverages

The Virginia Alcoholic Beverage Control Authority (Virginia ABC, or previously known as the Virginia Department of Alcoholic Beverage Control) is one of the eleven public safety agencies under the Secretariat of Public Safety and Homeland Security for the Commonwealth. The agency administers the state's ABC laws (created by the General Assembly). ABC stores are the only retail outlets in Virginia where customers may purchase distilled spirits. The profits that Virginia ABC contributes are collected from sales of distilled spirits at ABC stores, taxes collected on beer and wine sales, violation penalties and license fees. Since its establishment in 1934, Virginia ABC has contributed more than $9 billion to the Commonwealth's general fund. Virginia ABC employs more than 4,000 people statewide.

== History ==
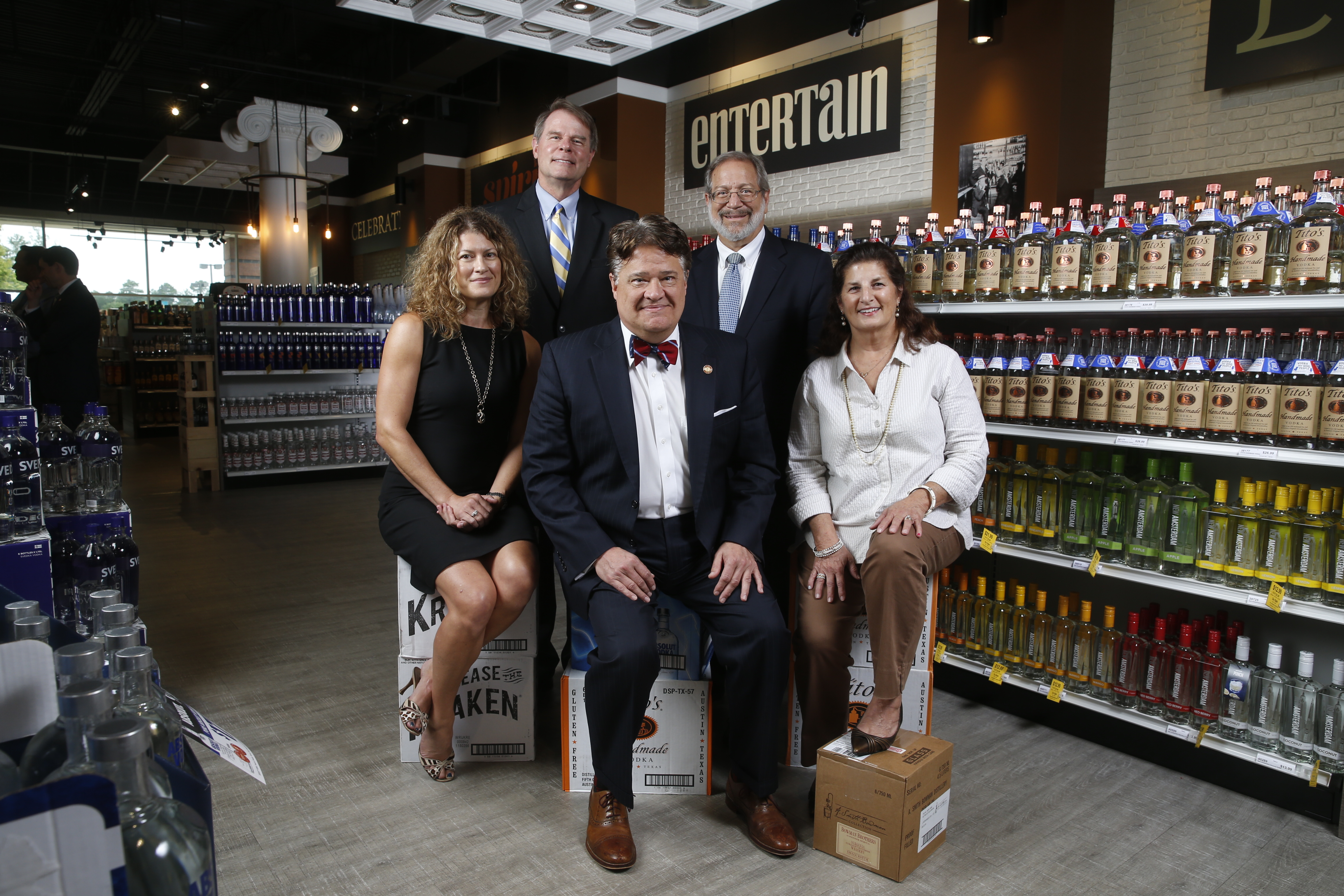
The Virginia ABC Board of Directors (from left to right): Chairman Jeffrey Painter, Chief Executive Officer Travis Hill, Beth Hungate-Noland, Maria Everett and Mark Rubin (not pictured Gregory Holland).

In response to the 21st amendment which repealed the 18th amendment relating to Prohibition, Virginia Governor John Garland Pollard called the Virginia General Assembly into special session to legalize 3.2 percent alcoholic beverages. The assembly met in Richmond on August 17, 1933.

On October 3, 1933, in a special election, Virginia voted 99,640 to 58,518 to ratify the 21st amendment and 100,445 to 57,873 to devise a plan of liquor control to supersede state Prohibition.

Delegates elected by the voters formally ratified the 21st amendment at a special convention held October 25, 1933, making Virginia the 29th state to ratify the 21st amendment.

A committee responsible for recommending the best plan of liquor control for Virginia presented its report to the General Assembly in January 1934. The General Assembly voted to adopt the "liquor control plan" on March 22, 1934, creating the Virginia Department of Alcoholic Beverage Control.

The first three Virginia ABC Board members were T. McCall Frazier, S. Heth Tyler, and R. McCarthy Bullington.

In 1936, the General Assembly granted full police powers to Virginia ABC's designated agents to assist local and federal officials enforce laws against bootlegging and moonshining. This permitted Virginia ABC to establish a force of investigators, who over time mounted campaigns against illegal liquor in Virginia.

In 1991, a federal judge declared the ABC's ban on gay bars unconstitutional in the case French Quarter Cafe v. Virginia Alcoholic Beverage Control Board.

In 2015, the General Assembly enacted a bill to convert Virginia ABC from an agency into an authority.

As of April 2023, the Authority operates 399 stores throughout the Commonwealth, with 93 percent of Virginians living within 10 minutes of a retail store.

In 2023, the Virginia ABC Board is composed of Chair Timothy D. Hugo, Vice Chair Maria J.K. Everett and Members Bill Euille, Gregory F. Holland, and Mark Rubin. Hugo was appointed in 2023 by Governor Glenn Youngkin, while the remaining four members were appointed by Governor Ralph Northam.

== Responsibilities ==
- Operating efficient, conveniently located retail outlets for distilled spirits, Virginia wine, vermouth and mixers
- Educating citizens about the dangers of alcohol misuse and hazardous behaviors, such as driving under the influence (DUI), binge drinking and public drunkenness
- Assisting vendors, wholesalers, suppliers and producers with matters related to the state's rapidly expanding craft distillery, winery and brewery industries
- Regulating the distribution of alcoholic beverages
- Informing the public and businesses with ABC licenses about Virginia alcohol laws
- Providing responsive and helpful customer service by fulfilling requests, fielding questions and addressing concerns
- Maintaining a strict environment of zero tolerance for underage purchase and consumption of alcohol
- Enforcing the laws of the Commonwealth pertaining to the manufacture and sale of alcoholic beverages
- Supplying a reliable source of revenue for the Commonwealth of Virginia's general fund
- Promoting the responsible consumption of alcoholic beverages to those of age
- Providing an effective hearings and appeals process for addressing disciplinary matters involving alcohol-related licenses held by businesses

== Stores and products ==
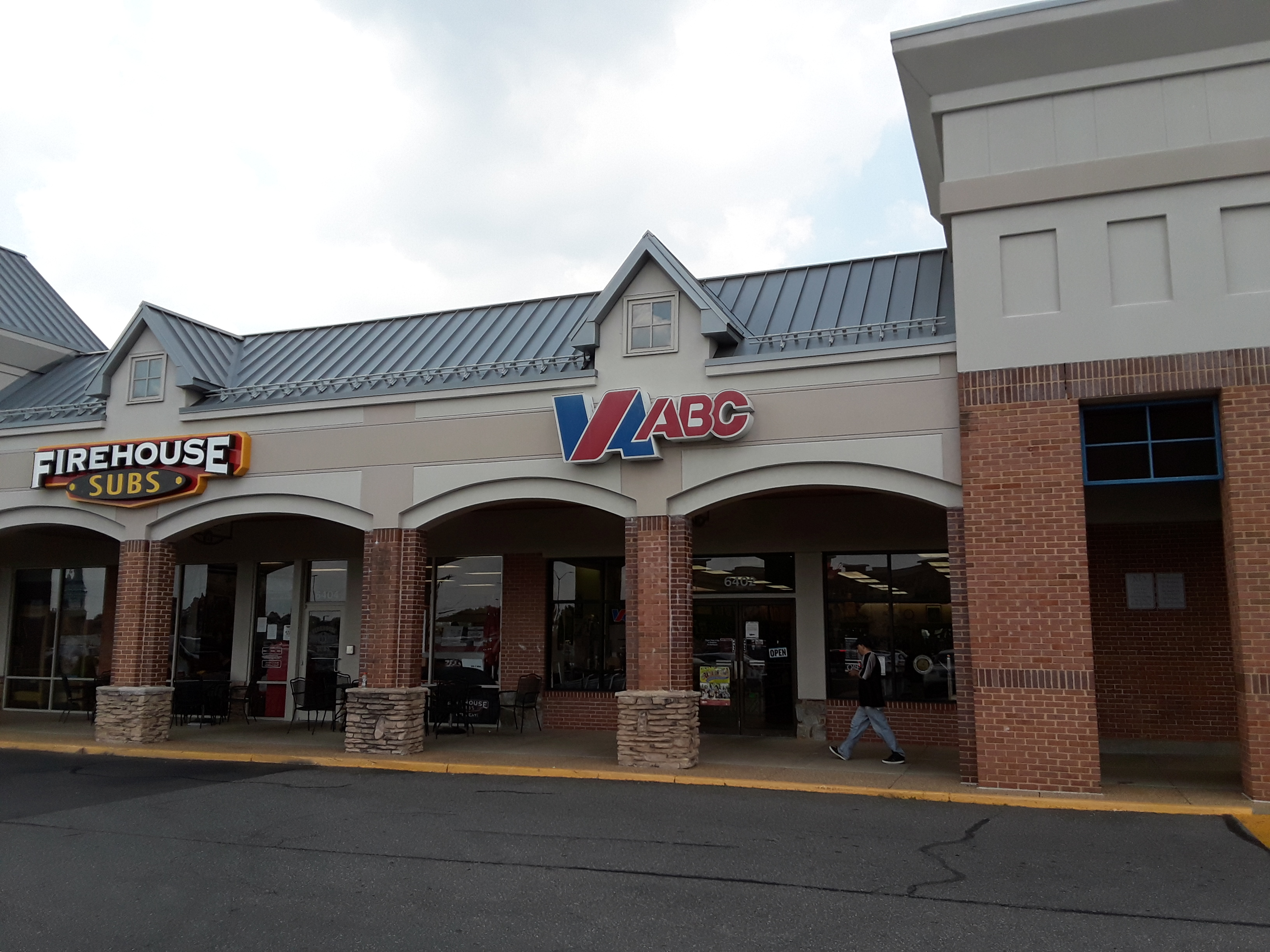
A Virginia ABC store in Springfield, Virginia

Virginia ABC has nearly 400 stores throughout the Commonwealth.

Virginia ABC offers a selection of merchandise—including mixers, vermouth and Virginia-made wines in addition to liquor—with more than 3,000 items available in the product catalog. These products are stored in a 315,000-square-foot distribution center located on a 40-acre site adjacent to a 95,000-square-foot headquarters in western Hanover County. Virginia ABC's distribution center receives product from 15–20 tractor trailer trucks and processes orders for 65–70 ABC stores each work day. These transactions amount to nearly 17,000 cases of distilled spirits received and shipped daily and more than 4 million each year. The agency's retail outlets receive a weekly delivery to restock items available for sale.

== Alcohol prevention and public education programs ==
Virginia ABC offers training and materials for use by licensed establishments, community groups and parents around the state. Agency education staff develop partnerships, conduct speaking engagements and present programs that promote the responsible consumption of alcoholic beverages to those of age and zero tolerance to those underage and highlight the dangers of alcohol misuse and hazardous behaviors, such as driving under the influence (DUI), binge drinking and public drunkenness. In addition, the agency provides thousands of dollars in grant funding to enhance community coalitions and programs at Virginia colleges and universities.

Virginia ABC develops and implements statewide alcohol education and prevention programming that is based on current data and trends. Virginia ABC offers information for elementary schools, middle schools, high schools, colleges, of-age adults, licensees, aging adults, other state agencies, community coalitions, non-profit organizations and faith-based groups.

Virginia ABC's programs include:

- Alcohol and Aging Awareness Group
- Being Outstanding Leaders Together against Drugs and Alcohol
- Higher Education Alcohol and Drug Strategic Unified Prevention
- Managers' Alcohol Responsibility Training
- Miss Virginia School Tour
- Project Sticker Shock
- Responsible Sellers and Servers: Virginia's Program
- Virginia College Alcohol Leadership Council
- Virginia Office for Substance Abuse Prevention
- Youth Alcohol and Drug Abuse Prevention Project

== Bureau of Law Enforcement ==
The Virginia ABC's Bureau of Law Enforcement has nine regional offices supporting more than 100 special agents located throughout the state. Virginia ABC special agents duties include conducting underage buyer compliance checks to help prevent underage access to alcohol; inspecting license applicants; enforcing ABC laws in licensed establishments; and conducting criminal investigations.

In addition, the Bureau of Law Enforcement includes licensing, compliance and administrative services. Staff in those areas serve as liaisons to breweries, distilleries and wineries; inform and interact with manufacturers, importers and distributors; collect Virginia state taxes; process invoices and renewals; conduct alcohol-related training about state ABC laws; and maintain records for businesses with ABC licenses and individuals seeking licenses related to alcohol sale and consumption at private special events.

== Hearings, appeals and judicial services ==
When there is a disciplinary matter involving a licensee (i.e., a business is charged with an ABC law violation), a contested ABC license application or an issue involving the beer or wine franchise acts, Virginia ABC will hold an administrative hearing. Virginia ABC administrative law judges travel throughout the state to conduct hearings on issues brought to the agency for resolution. Opposing sides introduce evidence in support of their case before a hearings officer who weighs the evidence presented and issues a decision. Once a decision is issued, either party has 30 days to appeal to the ABC Board.

== Licensing ==
Virginia ABC licenses all entities which sell or distribute alcoholic beverages in the Commonwealth, including providing permits for one-time events. Virginia law requires a permit for any public and many private organizations holding banquets, events, or block parties.

ABC licenses as of Fiscal Year 2017
Type	Number
ABC retail licenses	19,190
Licensed retail establishments	17,772
One-day banquet and special-event licenses	25,765

== See also ==
- List of law enforcement agencies in Virginia
