= Paul Krizek =

American politician

Paul E. Krizek
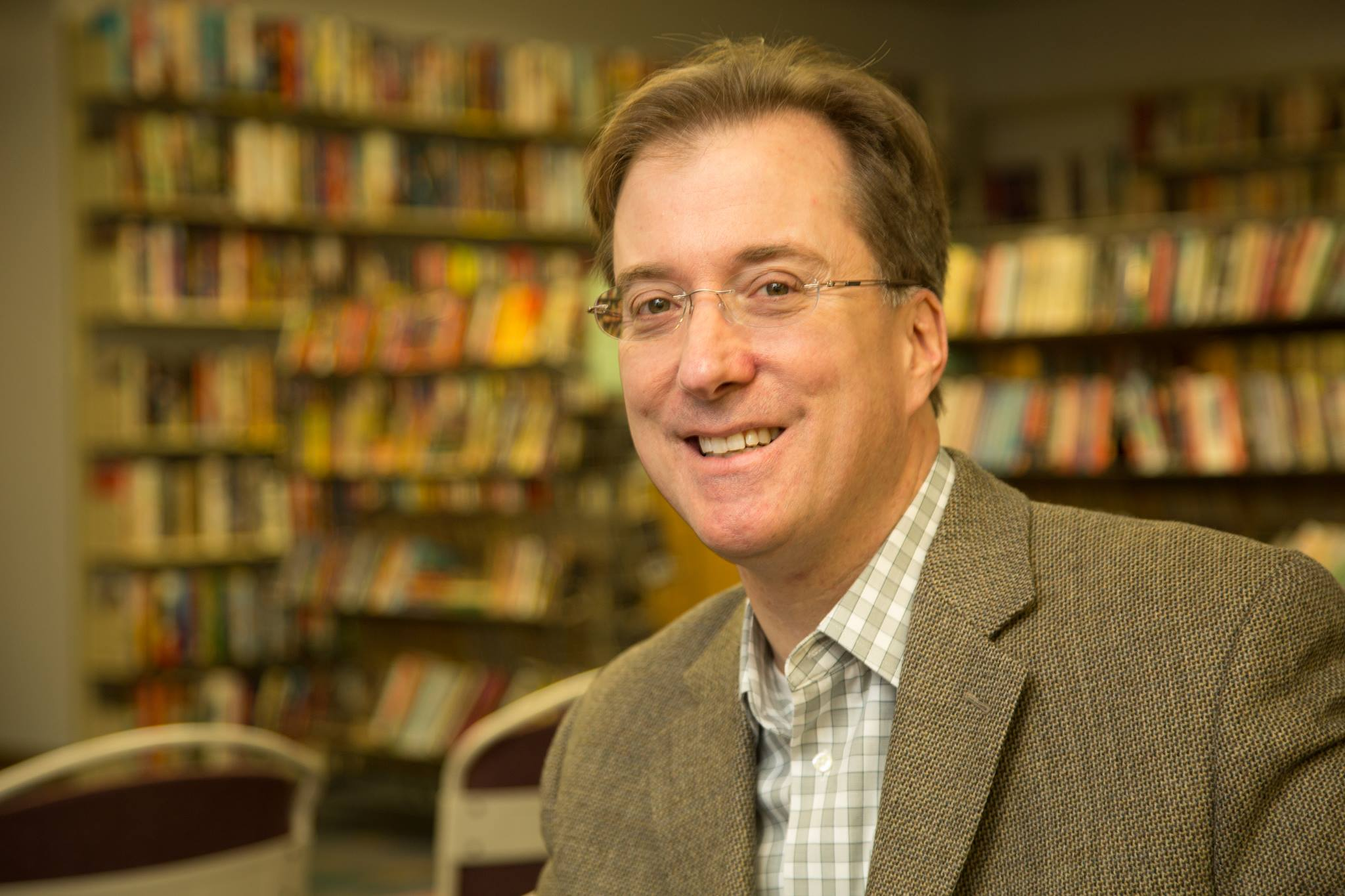
- Delegate Krizek, 2016

Member of the Virginia House of Delegates
- Incumbent
- Assumed office January 13, 2016
- Preceded by: Scott Surovell
- Constituency: 47th district (2016–2024); 16th district (2024–present)

Personal details
- Born: Paul Eugene Krizek; July 22, 1961 (age 65) Washington, D.C., U.S.
- Party: Democratic
- Spouse: Tracey Marie Navratil
- Children: 1
- Education: University of Virginia (B.A.); Catholic University (J.D.)
- Occupation: Government, Philanthropy
- Committees: Appropriations Privileges and Elections General Laws
- Website: www.paulkrizek.com

Paul Eugene Krizek (born July 22, 1961) is an American politician. He has served in the Virginia House of Delegates since 2016, representing the 16th district of Virginia in Fairfax County. Krizek is a member of the Democratic Party.

Krizek serves as executive director and general counsel of Christian Relief Services, headquartered in Mount Vernon, on the Richmond Highway corridor. Since 1999, he has also served as the general counsel and vice president for Christian Relief Services Charities, the charitable fundraising wing of the organization. He works to manage Christian Relief Services Charities, a $50 million international humanitarian organization that locally provides homes for abused women and children, the handicapped, and the homeless.

== Early life ==
Paul Krizek is a native of Mount Vernon, where he has lived for over 45 years. He attended Stephen Foster Jr. High School (now Walt Whitman Middle School) and Groveton High School (now West Potomac H.S.), both of which he now serves as their delegate. Krizek graduated in 1984 with a BA from University of Virginia and in 1987 with a J.D. from the Columbus School of Law at Catholic University in Washington, D.C.

== Political career ==
During his eight years on Capitol Hill, Krizek served as a member of Congressional delegations to NATO, Korea, Algeria, Western Sahara refugee camps, the United Nations, and as an election observer in El Salvador's first post-war presidential election.

Krizek was first elected to the Virginia House of Delegates on November 3, 2015, after winning the Democratic Primary against Justin M. Brown on June 9, 2015.

Krizek is a member of the House Committee on Appropriations (2018–), the Committee on Privileges and Elections (2019-), and the Committee on General Laws (2020-). Krizek currently serves as the Chairman of the Appropriations Subcommittee on Transportation and Public Safety, and the General Laws Subcommittee of ABC and Gaming. He previously served on the House Committee of Courts of Justice (2016–2018), the Subcommittee on Civil Laws (2016–2018), and the Committee for Counties, Cities and Towns (2016–2020). Krizek also serves as a member of the Virginia State Crime Commission. In 2019, Krizek was appointed to the Broadband Advisory Council by Speaker Kirk Cox, which advises the Governor on policy and funding priorities to expedite deployment and reduce the cost of broadband access in the Commonwealth. He was also appointed to the Commonwealth's Offender Population Forecasting Policy Committee in 2019 by the Secretary of Public Safety and Homeland Security Brian Moran. In 2020, Krizek was appointed by Speaker Eileen Filler-Corn to serve on the Northern Virginia Transportation Commission and the State Water Commission. Krizek serves as the Labor Liaison for the Virginia House Democrats.

During the 2019 legislative session, Krizek passed seven of his bills into law. HB 1790 codifies statewide closing procedures at absentee voting polling locations, ensuring that voters already in line to vote at closing can cast their ballot. HB 1936 creates an exemption so that dependents of Foreign Service Officers can be considered for in-state tuition after only 90 days of residency in Virginia. HB 2576 establishes a statewide Sex Trafficking Response Coordinator position through the Virginia Department of Criminal Justice Services to combat the growing problem of sex trafficking within the Commonwealth. Krizek's budget amendment to form the Grow Your Own Teacher Program (HB 1724) was included in Governor Northam's final budget. The Grow Your Own Teacher Program allows low-income students who want to teach at Title I schools in their communities the opportunity to receive scholarships in order to attend four-year colleges and earn their teaching degree.

Krizek was the lone Democratic House conferee on the Constitutional Amendment establishing the Virginia Redistricting Commission to enshrine in the Virginia Constitution a process for transparent and nonpartisan redistricting.

Krizek publishes weekly articles in his community newspaper, the Mount Vernon Gazette.

== Community involvement ==
Local Leadership:

- Board Member, Mount Vernon at Home
- Former Commissioner, Fairfax County Redevelopment and Housing Authority, 1997–2001
- Former Trustee, Family and Children's Trust Fund of Virginia, 2004–2012
- Member, Advisory Task Force on District Reapportionment of Fairfax County, 2001 and 2011
- Former Treasurer and Finance Chair, Northern Virginia Workforce Investment Board, 2000–2003
- Board Member, Human Services Charities of America, 2000–2003
- Member, Human Services Council of Fairfax County, 1995–1997
- Chairman, Fairfax County Task Force on Welfare Reform, 1996–1998
- Chairman, Fairfax County Federation of Civic Associations Human Services Committee, 1996
- Member, Hispanic Community Leadership Council of Fairfax County, 1995–1997
- Chair, Fairfax County Community Development Advisory Committee, 1991–1997
- Mount Vernon School Board member Selection Committee, 1990
- Member, Virginia and District of Columbia Bar Associations
- Member, Mount Vernon Lee Chamber of Commerce

Political Leadership:

- Former Chair and Vice Chair, Fairfax County Democratic Committee
- Former Chair, Mount Vernon Democratic Committee
- Clinton/Gore Delegate, Democratic National Convention, 1996

== Personal life ==
Krizek and his wife, Tracey Navratil, have a daughter, Khloe. His daughter attended West Potomac High School, his alma mater. He is also an active member of St. Luke's Episcopal Church in Alexandria, Virginia.

Professionally, he serves as executive director and general counsel for Christian Relief Services. Christian Relief Services forms partnerships with local, non-governmental organizations and affiliates to provide donations and affordable housing from the local to international level.

Krizek is also the former executive director of Running Strong for American Indian Youth, a charity founded by Krizek's father, Eugene Krizek, and Olympic gold medalist Billy Mills.

== Electoral history ==
Virginia House of Delegates, 44th district
| Date | Election | Candidate | Votes | % |
|---|---|---|---|---|
| November 3, 2015 | General | Paul E. Krizek | 9,606 | 94.72 |
| November 3, 2015 | General | Write-In | 536 | 5.28 |
| June 9, 2015 | Democratic Primary | Paul E. Krizek | 3,014 | 68.07 |
| June 9, 2015 | Democratic Primary | Justin M. Brown | 1,414 | 31.93 |
| November 7, 2017 | General | Paul E. Krizek | 18,243 | 92.77 |
| November 7, 2017 | | Write-In | 1,421 | 7.23 |
| November 5, 2019 | General | Paul E. Krizek | 13,713 | 70.67 |
| November 5, 2019 | | Richard Hayden | 5,669 | 29.19 |
| November 2, 2021 | General | Paul E. Krizek | 18,262 | 67.07 |
| November 2, 2021 | | Richard Hayden | 8,661 | 32.01 |
