= Delores McQuinn =

American politician

Rev. Delores McQuinn
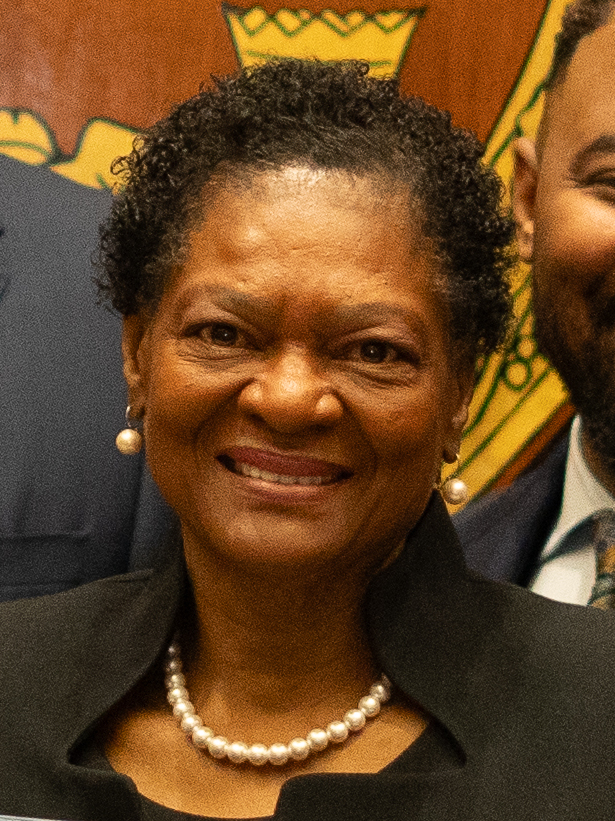
- McQuinn in 2024

Member of the Virginia House of Delegates
- Incumbent
- Assumed office January 8, 2009
- Preceded by: Dwight Clinton Jones
- Constituency: 70th district (2009–2024); 81st district (2024–present)

Personal details
- Born: November 26, 1954 (age 71) Henrico County, Virginia, U.S.
- Party: Democratic
- Spouse: Jonathan McQuinn
- Children: James E. Minor III, Daytriel J. McQuinn
- Education: Virginia Commonwealth University; Virginia Union University
- Committees: Counties, Cities and Towns; Transportation

Rev. Delores L. McQuinn (born November 26, 1954, in Henrico County, Virginia) is an American politician of the Democratic Party. She is a member of the Virginia House of Delegates, representing the 81st district, made up of parts of Chesterfield, Henrico, and Charles City Counties and the City of Richmond. She was previously a member of the Richmond City Council.

== Personal life ==
McQuinn studied at Virginia Commonwealth University and Virginia Union University.

== Political career ==
McQuinn was a member of the Richmond School Board 1992–96, serving as vice chair.

McQuinn was elected to the Richmond City Council in a special election on April 6, 1999, replacing Leonidas B. Young, II, who resigned in February, and Sherwood T. White, an interim appointment. She served as Vice-Mayor 2003–2004 and Vice-President of the Council 2007–2008.

When Delegate Dwight Clinton Jones was elected Mayor of Richmond in November 2008, McQuinn ran for the Democratic nomination for his 70th district House seat. She defeated lawyer Carlos Brown for the nomination, and was unopposed in the general election on January 6, 2009.

In the 2017 election, McQuinn faced a primary challenge from Alex Mejias.

McQuinn serves as the Chair of the Transportation Committee and as a member of the Education, Appropriations, and Rules. She also serves as the Chair of the Elementary and Secondary Subcommittee and as a member of the Compensation and General Government Subcommittee, Transportation and Public Safety Subcommittee in the Appropriations Committee. Additionally, McQuinn serves as a member of the Pre-K-12 Subcommittee in the Education Committee.

== See also ==
- 2009 Virginia House of Delegates election
