= Bostic v. Schaefer =

United States federal lawsuit challenging range same-sex marriage bans

- No. 14-1167
- Court: United States Court of Appeals for the Fourth Circuit
- Full case name: Timothy B. Bostic, et al., Plaintiffs - Appellees, Christy Berghoff, on behalf of themselves and all others similarly situated; et al., Intervenors v. George E. Schaefer, III, in his official capacity as the Clerk of Court for Norfolk Circuit Court, and Janet M. Rainey, in her official capacity as State Registrar of Vital Records, Defendant - Appellant; et al., Defendants, Michele McQuigg, Intervenor - Defendant.
- Decided: July 28, 2014
- Citation: 760 F.3d 352 (4th Cir. 2014)

Case history
- Prior actions: Judgment for plaintiffs sub. nom. Bostic v. Rainey, 970 F. Supp. 2d 456 (E.D. Va. 2014)
- Subsequent actions: Motion to stay mandate denied, No. 14-1167 (4th Cir. Aug. 13, 2014); Stay granted sub nom. McQuigg v. Bostic, No. 14A196, 2014 WL 4096232 (Aug. 20, 2014); Petition for certiorari denied, No. 14-153, 2014 WL 3924685 (Oct. 6, 2014).

Holding
- Virginia's same-sex marriage bans impermissibly infringe on its citizens' fundamental right to marry. Judgment for the plaintiffs affirmed 2–1, with Floyd, C.J. writing for the majority; Gregory, C.J. concurring. Niemeyer, C.J. dissents.

Court membership
- Judges sitting: Paul Niemeyer, Roger Gregory, and Henry F. Floyd, U.S. circuit judges

Bostic v. Schaefer (formerly Bostic v. McDonnell and Bostic v. Rainey) is a lawsuit filed in federal court in July 2013 that challenged Virginia's refusal to sanction same-sex marriages. The plaintiffs won in U.S. district court in February 2014, and the Fourth Circuit Court of Appeals upheld that ruling in July 2014. On August 20, 2014, the U.S. Supreme Court stayed enforcement of the Fourth Circuit's ruling pending the outcome of further litigation. State officials refused to defend the state's constitutional and statutory bans on same-sex marriage.

On October 6, 2014, the Supreme Court denied a writ of certiorari to the case, letting the circuit court decision stand.

== Lawsuit ==
On July 18, 2013, Timothy Bostic and Tony London, two gay men living in Norfolk, who had been in a committed relationship since 1989, filed a lawsuit in the United States District Court for the Eastern District of Virginia challenging the state's ban on same-sex marriage. The suit was filed by attorneys Robert Ruloff, Thomas Shuttleworth, Charles Lustig, Andrew M. Hendrick, and Erik Porcaro on behalf of Tim Bostic and Tony London. It named Virginia Governor Bob McDonnell as the principal defendant. After McDonnell left office in January 2014, the case was restyled as Bostic v. Rainey, with Janet Rainey, the state registrar of vital records, as lead defendant. A lesbian couple, Carol Schall and Mary Townley, married in California and parents of a teenager, joined the case as plaintiffs. On September 30, the American Foundation for Equal Rights attorneys Theodore Olson and David Boies joined the plaintiffs' legal team. The Norfolk Circuit Court Clerk (Schaefer) was represented by attorneys David Oakley and Jeffrey Brooke of the law firm Poole Brooke Plumlee PC in their roles as special counsel for the Attorney General's Office.

On January 23, 2014, less than two weeks after taking office, Virginia Attorney General Mark Herring announced that his office would no longer defend the state in Bostic and would argue for the plaintiffs instead. Governor Terry McAuliffe supported him. Judge Arenda Wright Allen heard oral arguments on February 4, 2014, with attorneys for the Clerk of the Circuit Court for the City of Norfolk defending the state's ban on same-sex marriage.

== District court ruling ==
On February 13, Judge Wright Allen ruled that Virginia's statutory and constitutional ban on same-sex marriage is unconstitutional, Bostic v. Rainey, 970 F. Supp. 2d 456 (E.D. Va. 2014). She held that marriage is a fundamental right, that a limitation on the right to marry is therefore subject to strict scrutiny, meaning that "compelling state interests" are required to justify it. She found that Virginia's arguments in support of its ban on same-sex marriage failed to meet that standard of review, and that they did not even pass rational basis review, the least demanding judicial standard. She stayed enforcement of her ruling pending appeal as the state had requested. The decision at the time "represented the strongest advance in the South for advocates of gay marriage." In her decision, she cited Loving v. Virginia, the case which ended bans on interracial marriage nationwide, which was also filed in the Eastern District of Virginia.

== Court of Appeals action ==
On March 10, 2014, the Fourth Circuit Court of Appeals allowed the couples in another case, Harris v. McDonnell, represented by Lambda Legal and the American Civil Liberties Union (ACLU), to intervene in Bostic. The attorneys who filed the appeal in Bostic had opposed allowing them to intervene. The court set a briefing schedule for the case, now styled as Bostic v. Schaefer and docketed as case number 14-1167, to be completed by April 30, with arguments held on May 13, 2014.

Arguments in the Fourth Circuit were held before Circuit Judges Roger L. Gregory, Paul V. Niemeyer, and Henry F. Floyd, and was characterized as "sharply divided," with the first two judges having vast differences in opinion on the case. The third judge, Floyd, stayed on the sidelines. Niemeyer maintained that the fundamental right to marriage, as recognized by the U.S. Supreme Court, is that of a "union of husband and wife," Of same-sex relationships and unions, he said: "It doesn't work biologically," and calling it marriage is to "play with the language." In complete contrast, Gregory questioned: "Why do you want to deny [children] all these warm and wholesome things about marriage? ... You think the child loves these parents any less because they are same-sex parents?" and demanded the defending lawyer to answer.

Ultimately, Gregory viewed the case as a "way station" to the Supreme Court, Niemeyer noted "Maybe we should just say, 'We pass,' and let the case go on," and Floyd seeing the Windsor case as dealing with the principle of federalism.

== Court of Appeals ruling ==
On July 28, 2014, the Fourth Circuit ruled 2–1 that Virginia's ban on same-sex marriage is unconstitutional, affirming the district court. Judge Henry Floyd, who was described as the neutral party in the "sharply divided" arguments as noted above, wrote the majority opinion. The majority conclusion is that "Virginia's same-sex marriage bans impermissibly infringe on its citizens' fundamental right to marry".

=== Standing ===
In the ruling, the majority first has to tackle the issue of standing: "Schaefer premises his argument that the Plaintiffs lack standing to bring their claims on the idea that every plaintiff must have standing as to every defendant. However, the Supreme Court has made it clear that 'the presence of one party with standing is sufficient to satisfy Article III's case-or-controversy requirement.'" As one couple was refused marriage licenses, that "license denial constitutes an injury for standing purposes." As for the second couple, who was legally married in California but did not seek a license, the court finds standing as well, in two ways:

First, in equal protection cases—such as this case—[w]hen the government erects a barrier that makes it more difficult for members of one group to obtain a benefit than it is for members of another group, ... [t]he injury in fact ... is the denial of equal treatment resulting from the imposition of the barrier[.] The Virginia Marriage Laws erect such a barrier, which prevents same-sex couples from obtaining the emotional, social, and financial benefits that opposite-sex couples realize upon marriage. Second, ... [s]tigmatic injury stemming from discriminatory treatment is sufficient to satisfy standing's injury requirement if the plaintiff identifies some concrete interest with respect to which [he or she] [is] personally subject to discriminatory treatment and [t]hat interest ... independently satisf[ies] the causation requirement of standing doctrine.

(internal quotes and citations omitted) As to the merits of the case, the majority first has to overcome the presumption that Baker v. Nelson controls the case. Noting that "[e]very federal court to consider this issue since the Supreme Court decided United States v. Windsor, 133 S. Ct. 2675 (2013), has reached the same conclusion", the majority lists the cases and decides that doctrinal developments since have eroded the "binding force" that a summary dismissal such as Baker has. The majority lists several major equal protection decisions since Baker, such as Craig v. Boren, Romer v. Evans, and Windsor itself.

=== Level of scrutiny ===
As to defendants' Fourteenth Amendment claims, the majority decides what level of constitutional scrutiny to apply: "Under both the Due Process and Equal Protection Clauses, interference with a fundamental right warrants the application of strict scrutiny." It notes that the opponents and proponents of Virginia's ban both agree that marriage is such a right, but they disagree as to whether "same-sex marriage" is included. Noting Loving v. Virginia, Zablocki v. Redhail, and Turner v. Safley the majority states: "Over the decades, the Supreme Court has demonstrated that the right to marry is an expansive liberty interest that may stretch to accommodate changing societal norms. ... These cases do not define the rights in question as 'the right to interracial marriage,' 'the right of people owing child support to marry,' and 'the right of prison inmates to marry.' Instead, they speak of a broad right to marry that is not circumscribed based on the characteristics of the individuals seeking to exercise that right."

=== Analysis under strict scrutiny ===
Finding that the fundamental right to marriage is inclusive of same-sex marriage, the majority goes on to strict scrutiny analysis. The state makes several arguments related to justifying the ban: "(1) Virginia's federalism-based interest in maintaining control over the definition of marriage within its borders, (2) the history and tradition of opposite-sex marriage, (3) protecting the institution of marriage, (4) encouraging responsible procreation, and (5) promoting the optimal childrearing environment." As to the first argument, and citing Schuette v. Coalition to Defend Affirmative Action, the state notes that Virginia voters have the right to determine what marriage is. The majority counters with the reasoning that "the people's will is not an independent compelling interest that warrants depriving same-sex couples of their fundamental right to marry," and goes on to cite West Virginia State Board of Education v. Barnette:

The very purpose of a Bill of Rights was to withdraw certain subjects from the vicissitudes of political controversy, to place them beyond the reach of majorities and officials and to establish them as legal principles to be applied by the courts. One's right to life, liberty, and property, to free speech, a free press, freedom of worship and assembly, and other fundamental rights may not be submitted to vote; they depend on the outcome of no elections.

As to the second argument, the majority responds citing Heller v. Doe ex rel. Doe: "The Supreme Court has made it clear that, even under rational basis review, the '[a]ncient lineage of a legal concept does not give it immunity from attack.'" In dismissing the third and fourth arguments, the majority finds that the Supreme Court severed the link between marriage and children and upheld a right not to procreate in Griswold v. Connecticut:

Marriage is a coming together for better or for worse, hopefully enduring, and intimate to the degree of being sacred. It is an association that promotes a way of life, not causes; a harmony in living, not political faiths; a bilateral loyalty, not commercial or social projects. Yet it is an association for as noble a purpose as any involved in our prior decisions.

It also states: "If Virginia sought to ensure responsible procreation via the [same-sex marriage ban], the laws are woefully underinclusive. Same-sex couples are not the only category of couples who cannot reproduce accidentally. For example, opposite-sex couples cannot procreate unintentionally if they include a post-menopausal woman or an individual with a medical condition that prevents unassisted conception.... We therefore reject ... attempts to differentiate same-sex couples from other couples who cannot procreate accidentally. Because same-sex couples and infertile opposite-sex couples are similarly situated, the Equal Protection Clause counsels against treating these groups differently." Also, the "responsible procreation argument falters for another reason as well. Strict scrutiny requires that a state's means further its compelling interest. ... Prohibiting same-sex couples from marrying and ignoring their out-of-state marriages does not serve Virginia's goal of preventing out-of-wedlock births. Although same-sex couples cannot procreate accidentally, they can and do have children via other methods."

Finally, on the optimal childrearing argument, the majority finds that the same-sex couples' and their amici supporters' arguments on that issue are "extremely persuasive." However, the majority needs not resolve the dispute, as first, in United States v. Virginia, it finds that "under heightened scrutiny, states cannot support a law using overbroad generalizations about the different talents, capacities, or preferences of the groups in question" (internal quotes omitted), and second, "strict scrutiny requires congruity between a law's means and its end. This congruity is absent here. There is absolutely no reason to suspect that prohibiting same-sex couples from marrying and refusing to recognize their out-of-state marriages will cause same-sex couples to raise fewer children or impel married opposite-sex couples to raise more children."

=== Conclusion ===
The majority concluded:

We recognize that same-sex marriage makes some people deeply uncomfortable. However, inertia and apprehension are not legitimate bases for denying same-sex couples due process and equal protection of the laws. Civil marriage is one of the cornerstones of our way of life. It allows individuals to celebrate and publicly declare their intentions to form lifelong partnerships, which provide unparalleled intimacy, companionship, emotional support, and security. The choice of whether and whom to marry is an intensely personal decision that alters the course of an individual's life. Denying same-sex couples this choice prohibits them from participating fully in our society, which is precisely the type of segregation that the Fourteenth Amendment cannot countenance.

=== Dissent ===
Circuit Judge Niemeyer dissented from the ruling. Citing Washington v. Glucksberg, he rejected the majority's reasoning:

This analysis is fundamentally flawed because it fails to take into account that the "marriage" that has long been recognized by the Supreme Court as a fundamental right is distinct from the newly proposed relationship of a "same-sex marriage." And this failure is even more pronounced by the majority's acknowledgment that same-sex marriage is a new notion that has not been recognized "for most of our country's history."

In Niemeyer's view, the correct course of action would be to reverse the judgment below and to defer to Virginia's political determination of the definition of marriage.

== Post-appellate procedure ==
The judgment order in the case states: "This judgment shall become final and take effect upon issuance of this court's mandate in accordance with Fed. R. App. P. 41." It is not stayed initially. Thus, by operation of law, the defendants have at least 21 days to request a stay, or file for rehearing or rehearing en banc. The Fourth Circuit—in response to the Virginia solicitor general's question about the mandate's timing—has stated that, per Federal Rule of Appellate Procedure 41(b) and based upon the current record, the mandate was scheduled to issue on August 21, 2014.

Michelle McQuigg, a Virginia county clerk and intervening defendant in the case, had asked the Fourth Circuit to stay its mandate in the case. On August 13, 2014, Judge Floyd, with the concurrence of Judge Gregory, denied the intervening defendant's motion on a vote of 2–1, with Judge Niemeyer voting to grant the motion. McQuigg petitioned the U.S. Supreme Court for a writ of certiorari and asked the high court to stay the Fourth Circuit's mandate until it disposes of her petition.

U.S. Supreme Court Chief Justice John Roberts, as circuit justice for the Fourth Circuit, requested that lawyers for the respondent same-sex couples submit a reply to McQuigg's stay application by August 18, 2014. He referred the matter to the full court, which stayed enforcement of the ruling on August 20.

== Reaction ==
Democratic Virginia Governor Terry McAuliffe said he was "overjoyed" at the ruling: "This is a historic ruling for our commonwealth, and its effect will affirm once again that Virginia is a state that is open and welcoming to all."

On the day of the Fourth Circuit decision, North Carolina Attorney General Roy Cooper announced he would no longer defend his state's ban on same-sex marriage. He said that because all judges in North Carolina were bound by the Fourth Circuit's precedent, "today we know our law will almost surely be overturned as well. Simply put, it's time to stop making arguments we will lose and instead move forward knowing the ultimate resolution will likely come from the United States Supreme Court." Ralph Reed, chair of the Faith and Freedom Coalition said Cooper's position "violates his solemn obligation to protect and defend the constitution and the laws of the state". He said Cooper was "simply wrong" to think the ruling with respect to Virginia "renders his oath of office inoperable."

A spokesman for South Carolina Attorney General Alan Wilson said he would continue to defend his state ban on same-sex marriage and that "Ultimately, this will be a decision for the U.S. Supreme Court. People should not rush to act or react until that time, when a decision is made by the highest court in the land".

On October 9, 2014, West Virginia Governor Ray Tomblin announced he was ordering state agencies to act in compliance with the Bostic ruling, which the U.S. Supreme Court had just refused to take up. The state started issuing marriage licenses to same-sex couples on that same day.

== See also ==
- LGBT rights in Virginia
- Same-sex marriage in Virginia
