= 2025 Virginia lieutenant gubernatorial election =

- November 4, 2025
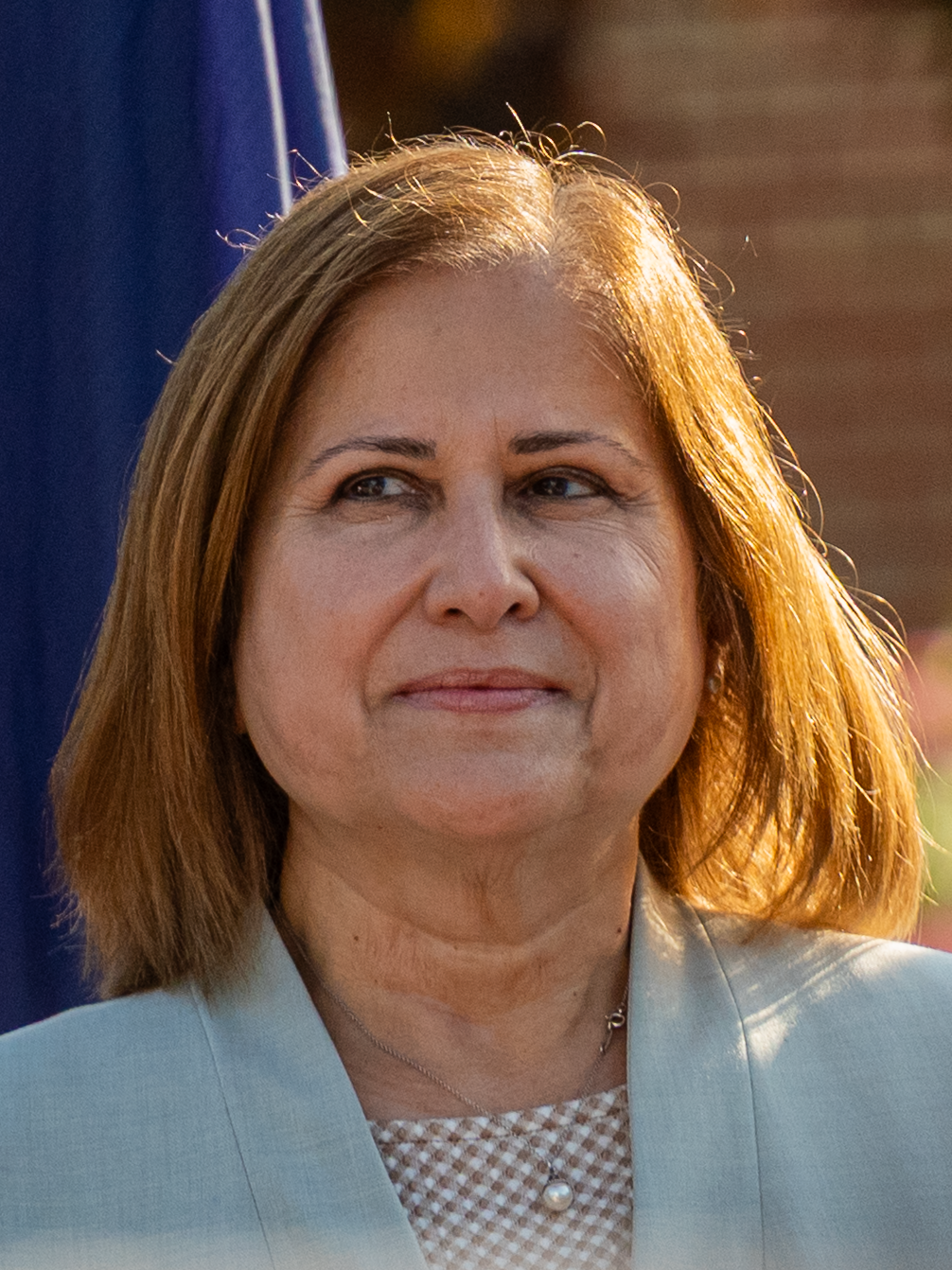

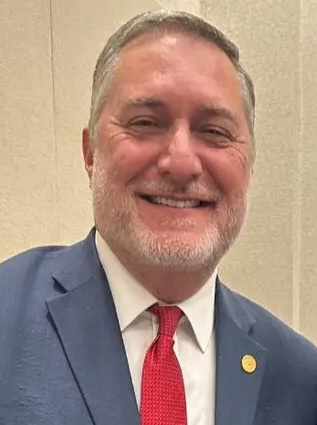
Nominee	Ghazala Hashmi	John Reid
Party	Democratic	Republican
Popular vote	1,900,104	1,505,395
Percentage	55.65%	44.09%
- Hashmi: 40–50% 50–60% 60–70% 70–80% 80–90% >90% Reid: 50–60% 60–70% 70–80% 80–90% >90% Tie: 40–50% No votes
Lieutenant Governor before election
Winsome Earle-Sears
Republican
Elected Lieutenant Governor
Ghazala Hashmi
Democratic

The 2025 Virginia lieutenant gubernatorial election was held on November 4, 2025, to elect the lieutenant governor of Virginia. Democratic state senator Ghazala Hashmi defeated Republican radio host John Reid. Hashmi succeeded Republican one-term incumbent Winsome Earle-Sears, who ran for governor.

John Reid won the Republican nomination on April 21, and was the first openly gay man nominated for statewide office in Virginia. Hashmi won the Democratic nomination on June 17, through a six-way primary. She was nominated as the first Indian American and Muslim for statewide office in Virginia.

Hashmi defeated Reid by a 11.56-point margin, which is the largest Democratic lieutenant gubernatorial margin since 1965. Hashmi focused on opposition to the Trump administration, while Reid made education and economic issues the main themes of his campaign. Hashmi's win was part of the Democratic sweep in the three statewide executive offices in the concurrent elections.

Hashmi was sworn in as the 43rd lieutenant governor of Virginia on January 17, 2026. She is the first Indian American elected to statewide office in Virginia and the first Muslim woman elected to statewide office in the country.

== Republican primary ==
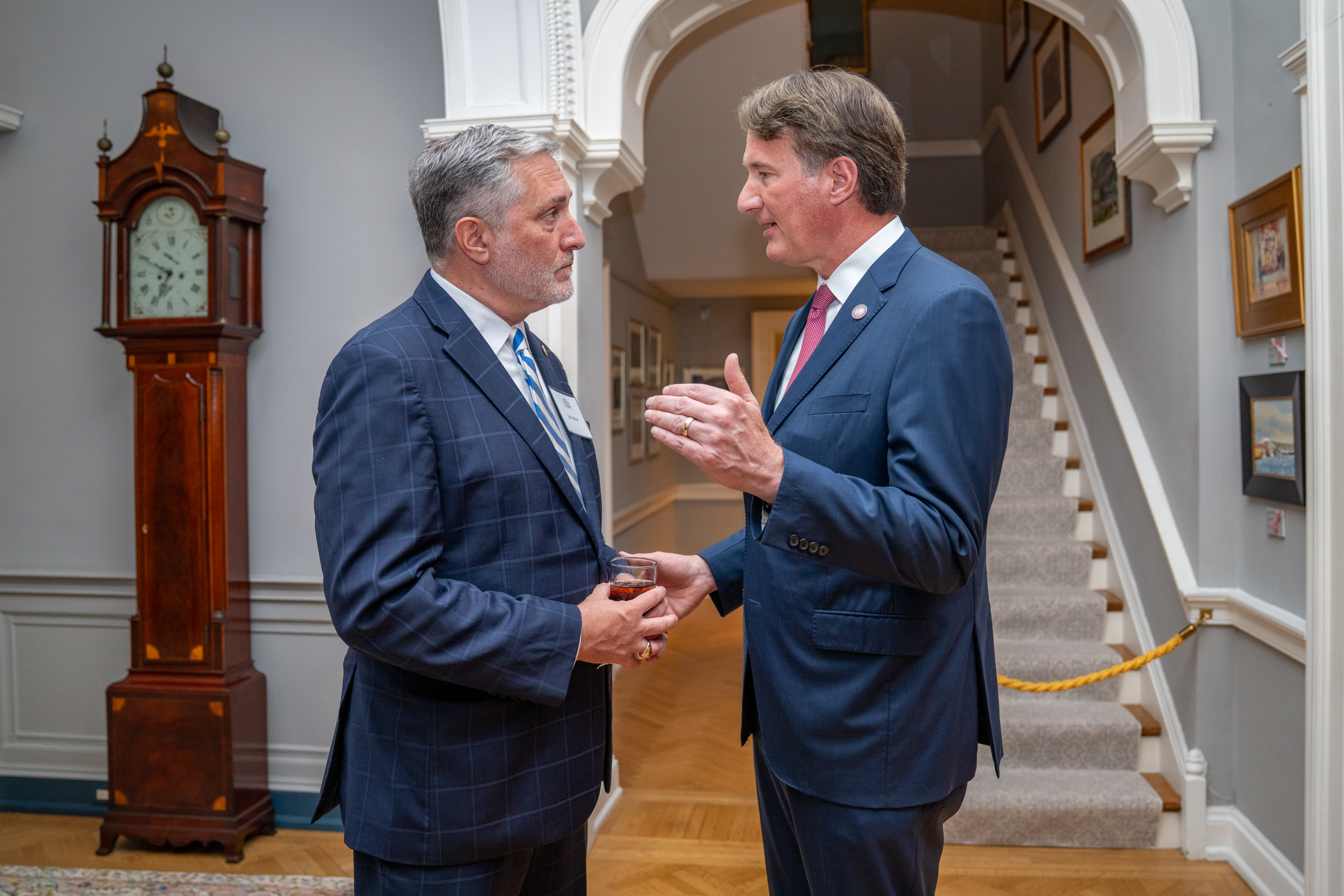
Reid (left) and Glenn Youngkin (right) speaking on June 25, 2025

In September 2024, Lieutenant Governor Winsome Earle-Sears announced her candidacy for governor of Virginia. In January 2025, Fairfax County supervisor Pat Herrity and radio host John Reid announced their candidacies for the Republican nomination for lieutenant governor.

On April 21, after the filing deadline, Herrity announced his withdrawal from the race due to health reasons. This made Reid the Republican nominee by default. Four days later, The Richmonder reported that Governor Glenn Youngkin, also a Republican, had asked Reid to withdraw from the race, citing sexually explicit images and posts on a page on the microblogging platform Tumblr which had a username that matched the name Reid uses on other social media accounts. Reid denied making the posts and pledged to remain in the race, arguing the effort to remove him from the ticket was due to his sexual orientation. Reid is Virginia's first openly gay candidate from either the Democratic Party or the Republican Party for statewide office.

Following backlash from within the Republican Party, Youngkin stated he would "support the nominees and their ticket". Youngkin staffer Matt Moran, whom Reid's campaign accused of being behind the effort to remove him from the ticket, resigned as a result of the controversy.

John Curran, a business consultant from James City County, did not qualify for the ballot. Following this, Curran filed as a write-in candidate for the general election and said, "I decided to give the voters an option. It's a hard option for me because people actually have to know how to spell your name and write it in. If Virginia wants me, they'll do it."

=== Candidates ===
==== Nominee ====
- John Reid, WRVA radio host, former communications director for then-U.S. Senator George Allen, and son of former state delegate Jack Reid

==== Withdrawn ====
- Pat Herrity, Fairfax County supervisor (2008–present)

==== Disqualified ====
- John Curran, business consultant

==== Declined ====
- Rich Anderson, former chair of the Virginia Republican Party (2020–2025) and former state delegate from the 51st district (2010–2018) (nominated to become assistant secretary of the Air Force for Manpower and Reserve Affairs)
- Winsome Earle-Sears, incumbent lieutenant governor (2022–2026) (ran for governor)

=== Endorsements ===
John Reid

U.S. senators

- George Allen, former Virginia (2001–2007)

Statewide officials

- Jim Gilmore, former governor of Virginia (1998–2002)

== Democratic primary ==
Six candidates appeared on the ballot for the Democratic primary. Prior to the election, the race was viewed to have three favored frontrunners: state senators Ghazala Hashmi and Aaron Rouse, along with former Richmond mayor Levar Stoney. In a very tight race among the three, Hashmi narrowly secured the nomination over Stoney and Rouse.

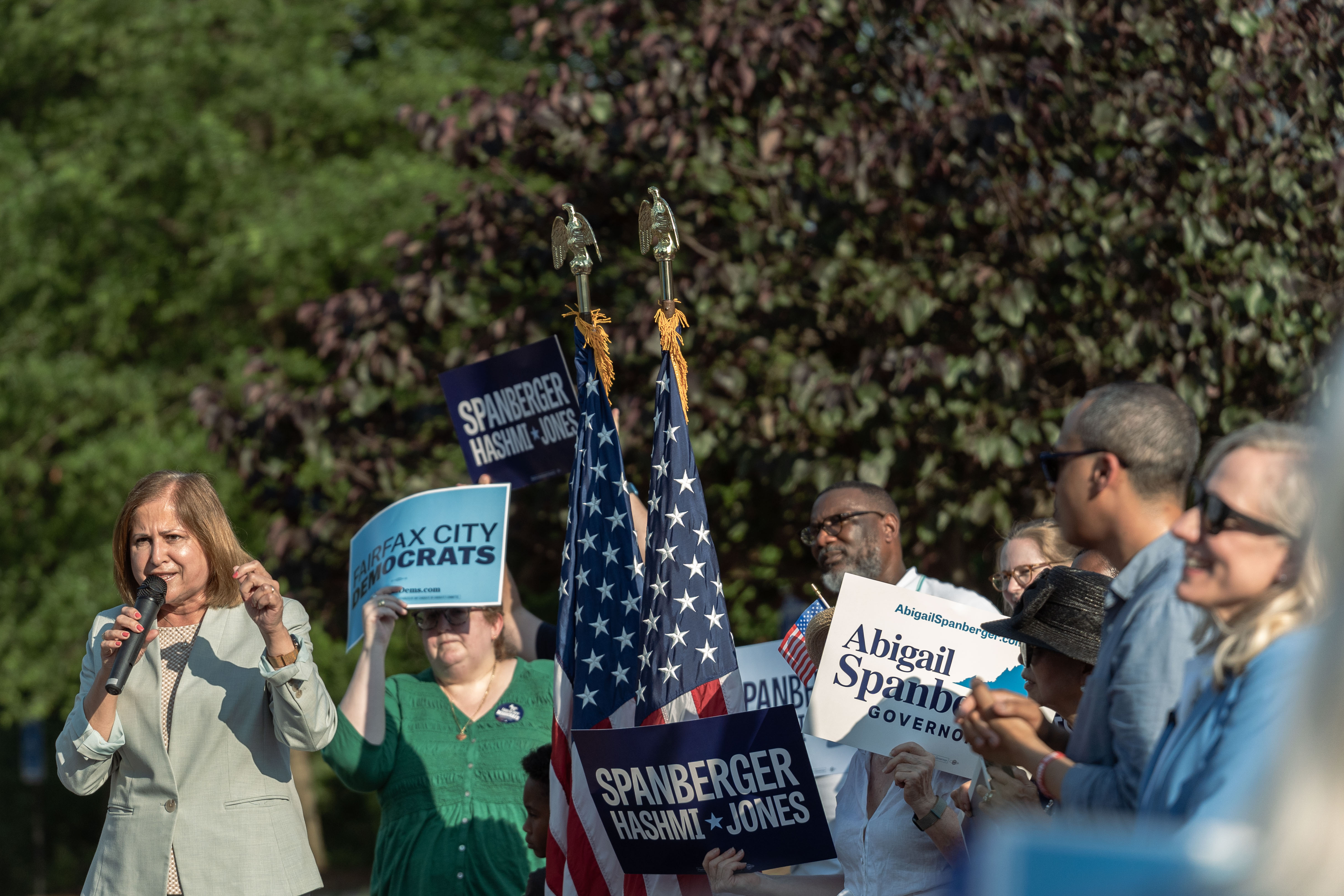
Hashmi speaking at a bus rally in Fairfax, Virginia with Jay Jones and Abigail Spanberger

=== Candidates ===
==== Nominee ====
- Ghazala Hashmi, state senator from the 15th district (2020–2026)

==== Eliminated in primary ====
- Alex Bastani, attorney and former economist in U.S. Department of Labor
- Babur Lateef, chair of the Prince William County School Board (2018–present)
- Aaron Rouse, state senator from the 22nd district (2023–present)
- Victor Salgado, federal prosecutor and law professor
- Levar Stoney, former mayor of Richmond (2017–2025) and former Virginia secretary of the Commonwealth (2014–2016) (previously ran for governor)

==== Withdrawn ====
- Carl Eggleston, former Farmville councilor (1984–1988) (endorsed Stoney)

==== Declined ====
- Sam Rasoul, state delegate from the 38th district (2014–present) and candidate for lieutenant governor in 2021

=== Endorsements ===
Ghazala Hashmi

U.S. representatives

- Leslie Byrne, former VA-11 (1993–1995)
- Ro Khanna, CA-17 (2017–present)

State legislators

- 5 state senators (Note: John Bell, former SD-13 (2020–2024); Jeremy McPike, SD-29 (2016–present); Saddam Azlan Salim, SD-37 (2024–present); Kannan Srinivasan, SD-32 (2025–present); Mary Margaret Whipple, former SD-31 (1996–2012))
- 9 state delegates (Note: Betsy Carr, HD-78 (2010–present); Kelly Convirs-Fowler, HD-96 (2018–present); Rae Cousins, HD-79 (2024–present); Patrick Hope, HD-01 (2010–present); Michael Jones, HD-77 (2024–present); Irene Shin, HD-08 (2022–present); JJ Singh, HD-26 (2025–present); Kathy Tran, HD-18 (2018–present); Rodney Willett, HD-58 (2020–present))

Individuals

- Clarence Dunnaville, activist
- Khizr Khan, activist

Organizations

- EMILY's List
- National Organization for Women Virginia Chapter
- Sierra Club Virginia Chapter
- UNITE HERE
Babur Lateef

Statewide officials

- Terry McAuliffe, former governor of Virginia (2014–2018) (co-endorsement with Stoney)
Aaron Rouse

U.S. representatives

- Elaine Luria, former VA-02 (2019–2023)
- Bobby Scott, VA-03 (1993–present)

State legislators

- Louise Lucas, president pro tempore of the Virginia Senate (2020–present) from SD-18 (1992–present)
- 3 state senators (Note: Mamie Locke, SD-02 (2004–present); Lionell Spruill, former SD-05 (2016–2024); Angelia Williams Graves, SD-21 (2024–present))
- 7 state delegates (Note: Bonita Anthony, HD-92 (2024–present); Alex Askew, HD-95 (2020–2022, 2024–present); Nadarius Clark, HD-84 (2022–2023, 2024–present); Michael Feggans, HD-97 (2024–present); Cliff Hayes Jr., HD-91 (2017–present); Phil Hernandez, HD-94 (2024–present); Candi King, HD-23 (2021–present))

Local officials

- Phillip Jones, mayor of Newport News (2023–present)
Levar Stoney

Executive branch officials

- Pete Buttigieg, former secretary of transportation (2021–2025)

U.S. representatives

- Jim Moran, former VA-08 (1991–2015)

Statewide officials

- Anne Holton, former Virginia secretary of education (2014–2016)
- Terry McAuliffe, former governor of Virginia (2014–2018) (co-endorsement with Lateef)
- Michael Schewel, former Virginia secretary of commerce (2002–2006)

State legislators

- Creigh Deeds, SD-11 (2001–present)
- 5 state delegates (Note: Destiny LeVere Bolling, HD-80 (2024–present); Laura Jane Cohen, HD-15 (2024–present); Dan Helmer, HD-10 (2020–present); Marty Martinez, HD-29 (2024–present); Josh Thomas, HD-21 (2024–present))

Local officials

- Carl Eggleston, former Farmville town councilor (1984–1988) and former lieutenant gubernatorial candidate

Newspapers

- Falls Church News-Press

Individuals

- LeVar Burton, actor and television host

=== Polling ===
Poll source	Date(s) administered	Sample size (Note: Key: A – all adults RV – registered voters LV – likely voters V – unclear)	Margin of error	Ghazala Hashmi	Babur Lateef	Aaron Rouse	Levar Stoney	Other	Undecided
Garin-Hart-Yang (D) (Note: Poll conducted for Stoney's campaign)	February 25 – March 1, 2025	600 (LV)	± 4%	8%	2%	10%	16%	—	63%
GBAO (D) (Note: Poll conducted for Hashmi's campaign)	March 24–27, 2025	600 (LV)	± 4%	13%	2%	15%	15%	3%	46%

=== Debates ===
2025 Virginia's lieutenant gubernatorial Democratic primary debate
No.	Date	Host	Moderator	Link	Democratic	Democratic	Democratic	Democratic	Democratic	Democratic
Key: P Participant A Absent N Not invited I Invited W Withdrawn										
Key: P Participant A Absent N Not invited I Invited W Withdrawn					Bastani	Hashmi	Lateef	Rouse	Salgado	Stoney
1	May 22, 2025	WJLA-TV	Kellye Lynn		P	P	P	P	P	P

=== Results ===
Results by county and independent city: Hashmi: 20–30%; 30–40%; 40–50%; 50–60%; Stoney: 20–30%; 30–40%; 40–50%; 50–60%; 60–70%; 70–80%; Rouse: 20–30%; 30–40%; 40–50%; 50–60%; 60–70%; Lateef: 30–40%; Bastani: 30–40%

2025 Virginia lt. governor Democratic primary
Party	Candidate	Votes	%
Democratic	Ghazala Hashmi	136,717	27.50%
Democratic	Levar Stoney	131,765	26.50%
Democratic	Aaron Rouse	130,485	26.25%
Democratic	Babur Lateef	42,099	8.47%
Democratic	Alex Bastani	28,476	5.73%
Democratic	Victor Salgado	27,593	5.55%
Total votes		497,135	100.00%

== Independents ==
=== Candidates ===
==== Declined ====
- Denver Riggleman, former Republican U.S. representative for VA-05 (2019–2021) (formed exploratory committee but opted not to run)

== General election ==
=== Campaign ===
Ghazala Hashmi, the Democratic nominee, had declined to participate in a debate with John Reid, the Republican nominee. No debates had been held between the candidates for lieutenant governor in the previous election. In response, Reid held a 40-minute debate without the involvement of Hashmi. Hashmi was represented by a computer monitor depicting her face, with responses delivered via artificial intelligence speech synthesis. The Reid campaign stated the responses delivered through speech synthesis were compiled and written by the Reid campaign, through information from interviews and Hashmi's website. The Virginian-Pilot noted that the on-screen attribution for the statements delivered occasionally listed far-right websites such as The Gateway Pundit. Noah Jennings, Reid's campaign manager, stated that they had aimed for a debate that was "fair and accurate to [Hashmi], not campy and overdramatic", while Ava Pitruzzello, a spokesperson for the Hashmi campaign, called it a "failed use of deepfakes" that was "desperate" and "straight out of Donald Trump’s playbook".

=== Predictions ===
Source	Ranking	As of
State Navigate	Likely D (flip)	August 15, 2025

=== Post-primary endorsements ===
John Reid (R)

U.S. representatives

- Jen Kiggans, VA-02 (2023–present)
- Rob Wittman, VA-01 (2007–present)

Statewide officials

- Bob McDonnell, former governor of Virginia (2010–2014)
- Jason Miyares, attorney general of Virginia (2022–2026)
- Glenn Youngkin, governor of Virginia (2022–2026)

State legislators

- Joe Morrissey, former SD-16 (2020–2024) (Democratic)

Organizations

- National Federation of Independent Business
- National Right to Life Committee
- NRA Political Victory Fund
- Virginia Police Benevolent Association
Ghazala Hashmi (D)

U.S. representatives

- Barbara Comstock, former VA-10 (2015–2019) (Republican)

Statewide officials

- Aruna Miller, lieutenant governor of Maryland (2023–present)
- Ralph Northam, former governor of Virginia (2018–2022)

State legislators

- David Ramadan, former HD-87 (2012–2016) (Republican)

Local officials

- Levar Stoney, former mayor of Richmond (2017–2024) (eliminated in primary)

Organizations

- End Citizens United
- Everytown for Gun Safety
- Giffords
- National Organization for Women Virginia Chapter
- Reproductive Freedom for All

=== Polling ===
Aggregate polls

Source of poll aggregation	Dates administered	Dates updated	John Reid (R)	Ghazala Hashmi (D)	Other/Undecided (Note: Calculated by taking the difference of 100% and all other candidates combined.)	Margin
Decision Desk HQ	through November 3, 2025	November 4, 2025	44.3%	48.9%	6.8%	Hashmi +4.6%

Poll source	Date(s) administered	Sample size	Margin of error	John Reid (R)	Ghazala Hashmi (D)	Other	Undecided
Quantus Insights (R)	November 3, 2025	1,069 (LV)	± 2.7%	44%	52%	1%	3%
The Trafalgar Group (R)	November 1–2, 2025	1,057 (LV)	± 2.9%	46%	48%	–	6%
Echelon Insights	October 28–31, 2025	606 (LV)	± 4.7%	46%	49%	–	5%
AtlasIntel	October 25–30, 2025	1,325 (LV)	± 3.0%	46%	52%	1% (Note: "Would not vote" with 1%)	1%
SoCal Strategies (R) (Note: Poll sponsored by Red Eagle Politics, a conservative content creator)	October 28–29, 2025	800 (LV)	–	45%	47%	–	8%
State Navigate	October 26–28, 2025	614 (LV)	± 4.0%	41%	53%	–	6%
Roanoke College	October 22–27, 2025	1,041 (LV)	± 4.1%	40%	42%	4% (Note: "Refused" with 3%; "Some other candidate" with 1%)	14%
A2 Insights	October 24–26, 2025	776 (LV)	–	45%	53%	–	2%
Christopher Newport University	October 21–23, 2025	803 (LV)	± 4.1%	45%	47%	1%	7%
Suffolk University	October 19–21, 2025	500 (LV)	± 4.4%	45%	45%	2% (Note: "Refused" with 2%)	8%
State Navigate	October 17–20, 2025	694 (LV)	± 4.0%	42%	53%	–	5%
The Washington Post/Schar School	October 16–20, 2025	927 (LV)	± 3.5%	44%	51%	3% (Note: "Neither" with 2%; "Would not vote" with 1%)	2%
The Washington Post/Schar School	October 16–20, 2025	927 (RV)	± 3.5%	42%	48%	8% (Note: "Neither" with 5%; "Would not vote" with 3%)	2%
Quantus Insights (R)	October 19–20, 2025	1,302 (RV)	± 2.8%	45%	49%	1%	5%
Kaplan Strategies (R)	October 16–18, 2025	556 (LV)	± 4.2%	41%	48%	–	11%
co/efficient (R)	October 15–17, 2025	937 (LV)	± 3.2%	42%	47%	–	11%
Clarity Campaign Labs (D) (Note: Poll commissioned by the Democratic Attorneys General Association)	October 14–17, 2025	958 (RV)	± 3.2%	44%	48%	–	8%
The Trafalgar Group/InsiderAdvantage (R)	October 13–15, 2025	1,039 (LV)	± 2.9%	46%	46%	–	8%
Virginia Commonwealth University	October 6–14, 2025	842 (A)	± 4.0%	43%	44%	–	13%
The Trafalgar Group (R)	October 8–10, 2025	1,034 (LV)	± 2.9%	46%	47%	–	7%
Christopher Newport University	September 29 – October 1, 2025	805 (RV)	± 3.9%	39%	48%	–	12%
The Trafalgar Group (R)	September 29 – October 1, 2025	1,034 (LV)	± 2.9%	44%	48%	–	8%
The Washington Post/Schar School	September 25–29, 2025	1,002 (LV)	± 3.4%	45%	49%	2% (Note: "None of these" with 2%)	3%
The Washington Post/Schar School	September 25–29, 2025	1,002 (RV)	± 3.4%	42%	47%	6% (Note: "Neither" with 4%; "Would not vote" with 2%)	4%
A2 Insights	September 16–28, 2025	771 (LV)	–	44%	49%	1% (Note: "Other" with 1%)	6%
Christopher Newport University	September 8–14, 2025	808 (RV)	± 3.9%	37%	48%	–	15%
Pulse Decision Science (R) (Note: Poll sponsored by Reid's campaign)	September 3–5, 2025	512 (LV)	± 4.4%	45%	42%	–	13%
Virginia Commonwealth University	August 18–28, 2025	804 (A)	± 4.1%	41%	45%	–	14%
SoCal Strategies (R) (Note: Poll sponsored by the Virginia Project)	August 31 – September 1, 2025	700 (LV)	–	41%	46%	–	14%
co/efficient (R)	August 23–26, 2025	1,025 (LV)	± 3.1%	43%	43%	–	14%
Roanoke College	August 11–15, 2025	702 (LV)	± 4.3%	35%	38%	–	27%
American Directions Research Group/AARP	June 25 – July 8, 2025	1,001 (LV)	± 3.1%	32%	47%	9% (Note: Marlow Jones with 9%)	12%
Virginia Commonwealth University	June 19 – July 3, 2025	764 (RV)	± 4.2%	36%	45%	4% (Note: "Wouldn't vote" with 2%, "Refused" with 2%, and "Someone else" with 0%)	15%

Hypothetical polling

John Reid vs. Generic Democrat

Poll source	Date(s) administered	Sample size	Margin of error	John Reid (R)	Generic Democrat	Other	Undecided
co/efficient (R) (Note: Poll sponsored by Founders Insight)	June 8–10, 2025	1,127 (LV)	± 3.1%	41%	39%	2% (Note: Marlow Jones with 2%)	18%

== Results ==
2025 Virginia lieutenant gubernatorial election
Party	Candidate	Votes	%	±%
Democratic	Ghazala Hashmi	1,900,104	55.65%	+6.48%
Republican	John Reid	1,505,395	44.09%	−6.62%
Write-in		8,678	0.25%	+0.13%
Total votes		3,414,177	100.00%	N/A
Democratic gain from Republican				

=== By county and independent city ===
Caroline, Nelson, Prince Edward, Spotsylvania, and York counties were won by Reid, despite voting Abigail Spanberger for governor.

Locality	John Reid Republican		Ghazala Hashmi Democratic		Write-in Various		Margin		Total votes cast
Locality	#	%	#	%	#	%	#	%	Total votes cast
Accomack	7,303	56.31%	5,658	43.62%	9	0.07%	−1,645	−12.68%	12,970
Albemarle	17,477	31.48%	37,931	68.33%	104	0.19%	20,454	36.85%	55,512
Alexandria	11,785	18.88%	50,422	80.79%	203	0.33%	38,637	61.91%	62,410
Alleghany	4,079	70.93%	1,664	28.93%	8	0.14%	−2,415	−41.99%	5,751
Amelia	4,584	72.60%	1,712	27.11%	18	0.29%	−2,872	−45.49%	6,314
Amherst	8,905	68.20%	4,121	31.56%	31	0.24%	−4,784	−36.64%	13,057
Appomattox	5,612	76.66%	1,679	22.93%	30	0.41%	−3,933	−53.72%	7,321
Arlington	18,305	18.45%	80,694	81.32%	232	0.23%	62,389	62.87%	99,231
Augusta	24,721	72.68%	9,177	26.98%	117	0.34%	−15,544	−45.70%	34,015
Bath	1,451	76.33%	448	23.57%	2	0.11%	−1,003	−52.76%	1,901
Bedford	29,469	75.43%	9,484	24.28%	115	0.29%	−19,985	−51.15%	39,068
Bland	1,985	82.98%	400	16.72%	7	0.29%	−1,585	−66.26%	2,392
Botetourt	12,003	71.81%	4,663	27.90%	48	0.29%	−7,340	−43.92%	16,714
Bristol	3,130	66.22%	1,575	33.32%	22	0.47%	−1,555	−32.90%	4,727
Brunswick	2,670	45.19%	3,230	54.66%	9	0.15%	560	9.48%	5,909
Buchanan	4,373	82.42%	908	17.11%	25	0.47%	−3,465	−65.30%	5,306
Buckingham	3,670	61.12%	2,328	38.77%	7	0.12%	−1,342	−22.35%	6,005
Buena Vista	1,429	69.23%	633	30.67%	2	0.10%	−796	−38.57%	2,064
Campbell	16,975	74.18%	5,805	25.37%	105	0.46%	−11,170	−48.81%	22,885
Caroline	6,814	50.99%	6,517	48.77%	32	0.24%	−297	−2.22%	13,363
Carroll	8,963	79.59%	2,274	20.19%	24	0.21%	−6,689	−59.40%	11,261
Charles City	1,527	44.04%	1,935	55.81%	5	0.14%	408	11.77%	3,467
Charlotte	3,223	68.72%	1,457	31.07%	10	0.21%	−1,766	−37.65%	4,690
Charlottesville	2,357	12.58%	16,337	87.21%	39	0.21%	13,980	74.63%	18,733
Chesapeake	43,709	45.64%	51,857	54.15%	206	0.22%	8,148	8.51%	95,772
Chesterfield	72,700	42.70%	97,220	57.10%	330	0.19%	24,520	14.40%	170,250
Clarke	4,326	56.94%	3,250	42.77%	22	0.29%	−1,076	−14.16%	7,598
Colonial Heights	4,173	63.80%	2,354	35.99%	14	0.21%	−1,819	−27.81%	6,541
Covington	1,028	62.04%	628	37.90%	1	0.06%	−400	−24.14%	1,657
Craig	1,802	80.05%	441	19.59%	8	0.36%	−1,361	−60.46%	2,251
Culpeper	13,011	60.01%	8,633	39.82%	38	0.18%	−4,378	−20.19%	21,682
Cumberland	2,652	60.41%	1,728	39.36%	10	0.23%	−924	−21.05%	4,390
Danville	4,795	39.47%	7,320	60.26%	32	0.26%	2,525	20.79%	12,147
Dickenson	3,432	77.33%	997	22.47%	9	0.20%	−2,435	−54.87%	4,438
Dinwiddie	7,184	59.72%	4,810	39.98%	36	0.30%	−2,374	−19.73%	12,030
Emporia	571	34.52%	1,080	65.30%	3	0.18%	509	30.77%	1,654
Essex	2,597	53.61%	2,241	46.26%	6	0.12%	−356	−7.35%	4,844
Fairfax City	3,087	29.78%	7,249	69.94%	29	0.28%	4,162	40.15%	10,365
Fairfax County	125,470	28.18%	318,496	71.54%	1,217	0.27%	193,026	43.36%	445,183
Falls Church	1,361	18.07%	6,157	81.74%	14	0.19%	4,796	63.67%	7,532
Fauquier	20,374	59.15%	13,985	40.60%	86	0.25%	−6,389	−18.55%	34,445
Floyd	4,804	65.04%	2,546	34.47%	36	0.49%	−2,258	−30.57%	7,386
Fluvanna	6,892	51.52%	6,454	48.25%	31	0.23%	−438	−3.27%	13,377
Franklin City	1,119	38.39%	1,792	61.48%	4	0.14%	673	23.09%	2,915
Franklin County	16,604	72.01%	6,401	27.76%	53	0.23%	−10,203	−44.25%	23,058
Frederick	23,584	60.76%	15,155	39.05%	75	0.19%	−8,429	−21.72%	38,814
Fredericksburg	3,207	30.71%	7,213	69.06%	24	0.23%	4,006	38.36%	10,444
Galax	1,301	69.72%	565	30.28%	0	0.00%	−736	−39.44%	1,866
Giles	5,076	75.40%	1,641	24.38%	15	0.22%	−3,435	−51.02%	6,732
Gloucester	11,629	67.41%	5,592	32.42%	30	0.17%	−6,037	−35.00%	17,251
Goochland	10,145	59.62%	6,841	40.21%	29	0.17%	−3,304	−19.42%	17,015
Grayson	4,562	78.48%	1,198	20.61%	53	0.91%	−3,364	−57.87%	5,813
Greene	5,581	58.95%	3,859	40.76%	27	0.29%	−1,722	−18.19%	9,467
Greensville	1,480	44.70%	1,828	55.21%	3	0.09%	348	10.51%	3,311
Halifax	8,132	61.39%	5,090	38.42%	25	0.19%	−3,042	−22.96%	13,247
Hampton	12,633	26.88%	34,253	72.88%	115	0.24%	21,620	46.00%	47,001
Hanover	37,432	62.23%	22,572	37.52%	151	0.25%	−14,860	−24.70%	60,155
Harrisonburg	3,781	28.90%	9,285	70.97%	17	0.13%	5,504	42.07%	13,083
Henrico	49,349	33.14%	99,322	66.70%	240	0.16%	49,973	33.56%	148,911
Henry	11,383	65.47%	5,959	34.27%	45	0.26%	−5,424	−31.20%	17,387
Highland	847	71.18%	339	28.49%	4	0.34%	−508	−42.69%	1,190
Hopewell	2,693	40.77%	3,893	58.93%	20	0.30%	1,200	18.17%	6,606
Isle of Wight	11,235	58.83%	7,812	40.91%	49	0.26%	−3,423	−17.93%	19,096
James City	19,923	46.85%	22,471	52.84%	131	0.31%	2,548	5.99%	42,525
King and Queen	2,030	62.19%	1,231	37.71%	3	0.09%	−799	−24.48%	3,264
King George	7,099	61.20%	4,480	38.62%	21	0.18%	−2,619	−22.58%	11,600
King William	6,129	68.01%	2,867	31.81%	16	0.18%	−3,262	−36.20%	9,012
Lancaster	3,395	56.63%	2,587	43.15%	13	0.22%	−808	−13.48%	5,995
Lee	5,427	84.88%	950	14.86%	17	0.27%	−4,477	−70.02%	6,394
Lexington	735	34.00%	1,426	65.96%	1	0.05%	691	31.96%	2,162
Loudoun	63,087	37.64%	104,175	62.15%	359	0.21%	41,088	24.51%	167,621
Louisa	11,577	61.37%	7,244	38.40%	42	0.22%	−4,333	−22.97%	18,863
Lunenburg	2,726	61.34%	1,702	38.30%	16	0.36%	−1,024	−23.04%	4,444
Lynchburg	13,699	51.58%	12,738	47.96%	124	0.47%	−961	−3.62%	26,561
Madison	4,365	66.21%	2,211	33.54%	17	0.26%	−2,154	−32.67%	6,593
Manassas	4,245	36.36%	7,406	63.43%	24	0.21%	3,161	27.07%	11,675
Manassas Park	1,213	30.50%	2,756	69.30%	8	0.20%	1,543	38.80%	3,977
Martinsville	1,523	38.71%	2,404	61.11%	7	0.18%	881	22.39%	3,934
Mathews	3,321	69.64%	1,442	30.24%	6	0.13%	−1,879	−39.40%	4,769
Mecklenburg	7,287	61.91%	4,462	37.91%	22	0.19%	−2,825	−24.00%	11,771
Middlesex	3,548	63.20%	2,062	36.73%	4	0.07%	−1,486	−26.47%	5,614
Montgomery	15,588	42.74%	20,605	56.49%	281	0.77%	5,017	13.76%	36,474
Nelson	3,937	51.34%	3,715	48.44%	17	0.22%	−222	−2.89%	7,669
New Kent	9,037	65.12%	4,825	34.77%	16	0.12%	−4,212	−30.35%	13,878
Newport News	18,244	32.53%	37,645	67.13%	190	0.34%	19,401	34.60%	56,079
Norfolk	16,621	26.01%	47,150	73.78%	137	0.21%	30,529	47.77%	63,908
Northampton	2,583	47.04%	2,899	52.80%	9	0.16%	316	5.75%	5,491
Northumberland	4,244	62.51%	2,537	37.37%	8	0.12%	−1,707	−25.14%	6,789
Norton	722	69.56%	310	29.87%	6	0.58%	−412	−39.69%	1,038
Nottoway	3,209	59.99%	2,128	39.78%	12	0.22%	−1,081	−20.21%	5,349
Orange	10,265	59.56%	6,926	40.19%	44	0.26%	−3,339	−19.37%	17,235
Page	7,031	75.85%	2,216	23.91%	23	0.25%	−4,815	−51.94%	9,270
Patrick	5,177	78.82%	1,380	21.01%	11	0.17%	−3,797	−57.81%	6,568
Petersburg	1,234	12.51%	8,567	86.87%	61	0.62%	7,333	74.36%	9,862
Pittsylvania	17,588	71.58%	6,943	28.26%	40	0.16%	−10,645	−43.32%	24,571
Poquoson	4,524	72.52%	1,706	27.35%	8	0.13%	−2,818	−45.17%	6,238
Portsmouth	8,977	28.86%	22,042	70.87%	85	0.27%	13,065	42.00%	31,104
Powhatan	12,115	71.29%	4,843	28.50%	35	0.21%	−7,272	−42.79%	16,993
Prince Edward	3,711	50.26%	3,648	49.40%	25	0.34%	−63	−0.85%	7,384
Prince George	8,122	59.59%	5,480	40.21%	27	0.20%	−2,642	−19.39%	13,629
Prince William	56,669	34.25%	108,434	65.54%	348	0.21%	51,765	31.29%	165,451
Pulaski	8,739	70.04%	3,684	29.52%	55	0.44%	−5,055	−40.51%	12,478
Radford	2,042	43.74%	2,551	54.65%	75	1.61%	509	10.90%	4,668
Rappahannock	2,255	55.93%	1,758	43.60%	19	0.47%	−497	−12.33%	4,032
Richmond City	13,489	14.88%	77,011	84.94%	164	0.18%	63,522	70.06%	90,664
Richmond County	2,043	65.99%	1,047	33.82%	6	0.19%	−996	−32.17%	3,096
Roanoke City	10,628	34.62%	19,996	65.13%	76	0.25%	9,368	30.51%	30,700
Roanoke County	25,400	59.50%	17,179	40.24%	113	0.26%	−8,221	−19.26%	42,692
Rockbridge	6,710	66.49%	3,365	33.35%	16	0.16%	−3,345	−33.15%	10,091
Rockingham	24,665	68.59%	11,207	31.16%	90	0.25%	−13,458	−37.42%	35,962
Russell	6,995	79.69%	1,554	17.70%	229	2.61%	−5,441	−61.98%	8,778
Salem	5,438	57.77%	3,954	42.01%	21	0.22%	−1,484	−15.77%	9,413
Scott	6,112	84.14%	1,135	15.63%	17	0.23%	−4,977	−68.52%	7,264
Shenandoah	12,645	69.87%	5,407	29.88%	46	0.25%	−7,238	−39.99%	18,098
Smyth	7,743	77.97%	2,129	21.44%	59	0.59%	−5,614	−56.53%	9,931
Southampton	4,602	62.26%	2,780	37.61%	9	0.12%	−1,822	−24.65%	7,391
Spotsylvania	30,050	50.43%	29,386	49.32%	147	0.25%	−664	−1.11%	59,583
Stafford	28,885	45.93%	33,897	53.90%	110	0.17%	5,012	7.97%	62,892
Staunton	4,358	40.48%	6,386	59.31%	23	0.21%	2,028	18.84%	10,767
Suffolk	16,575	39.98%	24,796	59.81%	87	0.21%	8,221	19.83%	41,458
Surry	1,745	48.87%	1,818	50.91%	8	0.22%	73	2.04%	3,571
Sussex	1,834	47.84%	1,992	51.96%	8	0.21%	158	4.12%	3,834
Tazewell	10,374	82.70%	2,096	16.71%	74	0.59%	−8,278	−65.99%	12,544
Virginia Beach	78,930	46.88%	89,258	53.01%	186	0.11%	10,328	6.13%	168,374
Warren	10,547	65.45%	5,484	34.03%	83	0.52%	−5,063	−31.42%	16,114
Washington	15,589	74.90%	5,035	24.19%	188	0.90%	−10,554	−50.71%	20,812
Waynesboro	4,110	48.62%	4,327	51.18%	17	0.20%	217	2.57%	8,454
Westmoreland	4,509	55.78%	3,562	44.07%	12	0.15%	−947	−11.72%	8,083
Williamsburg	1,773	26.55%	4,882	73.11%	23	0.34%	3,109	46.56%	6,678
Winchester	3,599	41.12%	5,132	58.63%	22	0.25%	1,533	17.51%	8,753
Wise	8,766	80.23%	2,136	19.55%	24	0.22%	−6,630	−60.68%	10,926
Wythe	8,498	77.57%	2,410	22.00%	47	0.43%	−6,088	−55.57%	10,955
York	16,269	51.82%	15,029	47.87%	99	0.32%	−1,240	−3.95%	31,397
Totals	1,505,395	44.09%	1,900,104	55.65%	8,678	0.25%	394,709	11.56%	3,414,177

Counties and independent cities that flipped from Republican to Democratic

- Chesapeake (independent city)
- Chesterfield (largest municipality: Chester)
- James City (largest municipality: Williamsburg)
- Montgomery (largest municipality: Blacksburg)
- Northampton (largest municipality: Exmore)
- Radford (independent city)
- Stafford (largest municipality: Aquia Harbour)
- Surry (largest municipality: Claremont)
- Virginia Beach (independent city)
- Waynesboro (independent city)

=== By congressional district ===
Hashmi won seven of 11 congressional districts, including one held by a Republican.

District	Reid	Hashmi	Representative
1st	51.0%	48.8%	Rob Wittman
2nd	48.4%	51.4%	Jen Kiggans
3rd	29.6%	70.1%	Bobby Scott
4th	30.7%	69.1%	Jennifer McClellan
5th	55.1%	44.6%	John McGuire
6th	59.6%	40.1%	Ben Cline
7th	44.0%	55.8%	Eugene Vindman
8th	22.0%	77.7%	Don Beyer
9th	69.2%	30.3%	Morgan Griffith
10th	41.8%	58.0%	Suhas Subramanyam
11th	28.5%	71.3%	James Walkinshaw

== Exit poll ==
=== CNN exit poll ===
2025 Virginia lieutenant gubernatorial election voter demographics (CNN)
Demographic subgroup	Hashmi	Reid	% of total vote
Ideology
Liberals	95	5	33
Moderates	66	33	33
Conservatives	8	92	35
Party
Democrats	98	2	36
Republicans	6	94	31
Independents	56	44	33
Donald Trump job approval
Approve	5	95	39
Disapprove	91	9	59
Most important issue facing Virginia
Economy	61	39	48
Health care	80	20	21
Education	52	48	11
Immigration	11	89	11
2024 presidential vote
Kamala Harris	97	3	51
Donald Trump	5	95	42
Another candidate	53	46	2
Did not vote	61	39	3
Gender
Men	46	54	47
Women	63	36	53
Income
$200,000 or more	62	38	14
$100,000-$199,999	51	49	28
$50,000-$99,999	56	44	31
Less than $50,000	60	40	26
Race/ethnicity
White	45	55	71
Asian	78	21	4
Latino	65	35	5
Black	90	10	16
White born-again or evangelical Christian?
Yes	19	81	28
No	69	31	72
Race by gender
White men	36	64	34
White women	53	47	36
Black men	84	16	7
Black women	95	5	9
Latino men	52	48	2
Latina women	75	25	2
All other voters	69	30	9
Age
18–29 years old	68	32	13
30–44 years old	61	39	20
45-64 years old	52	47	35
65 and older	50	50	32
Area type
Urban	64	36	19
Suburban	57	43	57
Rural	44	56	24
Education
College graduate	61	39	52
No college degree	49	51	48
Education by race
White college graduates	55	45	38
Non-white college graduates	77	23	14
Whites without college	34	66	33
Non-whites without college	82	17	15
Education by gender and race
White women with college degrees	64	36	20
White women without college degrees	39	61	16
White men with college degrees	45	55	18
White men without college degrees	28	72	17
Voters of color	80	20	30
Educational attainment
Advanced degree	65	35	23
Bachelor's degree	58	42	29
Associate's degree	52	48	10
Some college	53	47	17
Never attended college	45	55	21

== See also ==
- 2025 United States elections
- 2025 Virginia elections
- 2025 Virginia gubernatorial election
- 2025 Virginia Attorney General election
- 2025 Virginia House of Delegates election

== Notes ==
Partisan clients
