= 2025 Virginia elections =

American state elections

- November 4, 2025

The 2025 Virginia elections took place throughout 2025 — the general election was held on November 4, 2025, to elect the governor, lieutenant governor, and attorney general of Virginia. All 100 seats in the House of Delegates were up for election. Primary elections took place on June 17, 2025, while the in-person early voting period ran from September 19 to November 1, 2025. There were several special elections throughout 2025 in the House of Delegates, Virginia Senate, and U.S. House of Representatives in Virginia.

Ultimately, the Democratic Party won all three statewide executive offices and expanded their slim majority in the House of Delegates by thirteen seats to a 64-36 majority which created a Democratic trifecta in Virginia's government for the first time since 2019.

== Special ==
On January 7, 2025, special elections were held for the 32nd Senate district, the 10th Senate district, and the 26th House of Delegates district.

=== 10th Senate district ===
Following John McGuire's election to Virginia's 5th congressional district, a special election was held to replace his seat for Virginia's 10th Senate district. A Republican primary election was held on December 13, 2024.

Virginia Senate Special General Election: 10th District, 2025
Party	Candidate	Votes	%
Republican	Luther Cifers	12,027	57.8%
Democratic	Jack Trammell	8,775	42.2%
Total votes		20,802	100.0%

=== 32nd Senate district ===
Following Suhas Subramanyam's election to Virginia's 10th congressional district, a special election was held to replace his seat for Virginia's 32nd Senate district. Democratic and Republican party primary elections were held on November 16, 2024.

Virginia Senate Special General Election: 32nd District, 2025
Party	Candidate	Votes	%
Democratic	Kannan Srinivasan	18,825	61.8%
Republican	Tumay Harding	11,629	38.2%
Total votes		30,454	100.0%

=== 26th House of Delegates district ===
Following Kannan Srinivasan's victory in the Democratic primary special election for Virginia's 32nd Senate district, a special election was held to replace his seat for Virginia's 26th House of Delegates district. Republican and Democratic primary elections were held on November 18, 2024, and November 23, 2024, respectively.

Virginia House of Delegates Special General Election: 26th District, 2025
Party	Candidate	Votes	%
Democratic	JJ Singh	6,404	62.4%
Republican	Ram Venkatachalam	3,857	37.6%
Total votes		10,261	100.0%

=== 11th congressional district ===
Following the death of Gerry Connolly, a special election for U.S. representative for Virginia's 11th congressional district was held on September 9, 2025.

2025 Virginia's 11th congressional district special election
Party	Candidate	Votes	%	±%
Democratic	James Walkinshaw	109,578	74.78	+8.10%
Republican	Stewart Whitson	36,681	25.03	−7.83%
Write-in		272	0.19	-0.26%
Total votes		146,531	100.00	N/A
Democratic hold				

== Governor ==
Incumbent Republican governor Glenn Youngkin was ineligible to run for re-election, as the Constitution of Virginia prohibits its governors from serving consecutive terms. Former U.S. Representative Abigail Spanberger was the Democratic nominee and Lieutenant Governor Winsome Earle-Sears was the Republican nominee. Spanberger defeated Earle-Sears by 15.36%.

== Lieutenant governor ==
Incumbent Republican Lieutenant Governor Winsome Earle-Sears did not run for re-election to a second term in office, instead choosing to run for governor. Democratic Party primary elections took place on June 17, 2025. State Senator Ghazala Hashmi was the Democratic nominee and former radio host John Reid was the Republican nominee. Hashmi defeated Reid by 11.56%.

== Attorney General ==
Incumbent Republican Attorney General, Jason Miyares, ran for re-election, but lost to Democratic nominee Jay Jones by 6.69%.

== House of Delegates ==
All 100 seats in the Virginia House of Delegates were up for election. The chamber had been controlled by the Democratic Party, holding a majority of two seats. Primary elections took place on June 17, 2025.

The Virginia Senate is not up for election until 2027.

== Aftermath ==
The landslide victories for Democrats caused internal fighting among Virginian Republicans. The scale of Democratic victory was unexpected both for Republicans and Democrats.
