= 2024 Virginia elections =

- November 5, 2024

A general election was held in the U.S. state of Virginia on November 5, 2024.

== Local ==
- 2024 Richmond, Virginia mayoral election

== State ==
=== Special ===
==== Virginia's 32nd Senate district ====
Following Suhas Subramanyam's election to Virginia's 10th Congressional District, a special election is scheduled to be held on January 7, 2025 to replace his seat for Virginia's 32nd Senate district. Democratic and Republican party primary elections were held on November 16, 2024.

Virginia Senate special Democratic primary election: 32nd District, 2024
Party	Candidate	Votes	%
Democratic	Kannan Srinivasan	2,698	44.5%
Democratic	Ibraheem Samirah	1,288	21.2%
Democratic	Buta Biberaj	823	13.6%
Democratic	Sreedhar Nagireddi	574	9.5%
Democratic	Hurunnessa Fariad	428	7.1%
Democratic	Puja Khanna	254	4.2%
Total votes		6,065	100%

Virginia Senate special Republican primary election: 32nd District, 2024
Party	Candidate	Votes	%
Republican	Tumay Harding	1,068	63.8%
Republican	Rafi Khaja	257	15.4%
Republican	Ommair Butt	153	9.2%
Republican	Samuel Yan	98	5.9%
Republican	Chad Dally	85	5.1%
Republican	Sam Abraham	12	0.7%
Republican	Tushar Dode	0	0%
Total votes		1,673	100%

==== Virginia's 10th Senate district ====
Following John McGuire's election to Virginia’s 5th Congressional District, a special election is set to be held to replace his seat for Virginia's 10th Senate district. A Republican primary election was held on December 13, 2024, electing Luther Cifers. A special election is set to be held on January 7, 2025, with Democrat Jack Trammell facing against Cifers.

Virginia Senate special Republican primary election: 10th District, 2024
Party	Candidate	Votes	%
Republican	Luther Cifers		
Republican	Duane Adams		
Republican	Amanda Chase		
Republican	Alex Cheatham		
Republican	Jean Gannon		
Republican	Bryan Hamlet		
Republican	Shayne Snavely		
Total votes			

==== Virginia's 26th House of Delegates district ====
Following Kannan Srinivasan's victory in the Democratic primary special election for Virginia's 32nd Senate district, a special election is scheduled to be held on January 7, 2025 to replace his seat for Virginia's 26th House of Delegates district. A Republican primary election was held on November 18, 2024. A Democratic primary election was held on November 23, 2024.

Virginia House of Delegates special Democratic primary election: 26th District, 2024
Party	Candidate	Votes	%
Democratic	JJ Singh	745	40.5%
Democratic	Sam Nandi	425	23.1%
Democratic	Ibraheem Samirah	323	17.6%
Democratic	Arben Istrefi	280	15.2%
Democratic	Lakesha Gorham-McDurfee	66	3.6%
Total votes		1,839	100%

Virginia House of Delegates special Republican primary election: 26th District, 2024
Party	Candidate	Votes	%
Republican	Ram Venkatachalam	12	57.1%
Republican	Ommair Butt	9	42.9%
Total votes		21	100%

== Ballot measures ==
A ballot measure to amend the Constitution of Virginia to provide a tax exemption that is available to the surviving spouses of soldiers killed in action also available to the surviving spouses of soldiers who died in the line of duty passed with 93% support.

2024 Virginia elections
- November 5, 2024
- Should the Constitution of Virginia be amended so that the tax exemption that is currently available to the surviving spouses of soldiers killed in action is also available to the surviving spouses of soldiers who died in the line of duty?

Results
Choice	Votes	%
Yes	4,034,143	93.04%
No	301,945	6.96%
Total votes	4,336,088	100.00%
County and independent city results
Yes
90-100%
80-90%

== See also ==
- Virginia State Board of Elections
