= Ibraheem Samirah =

American dentist and politician

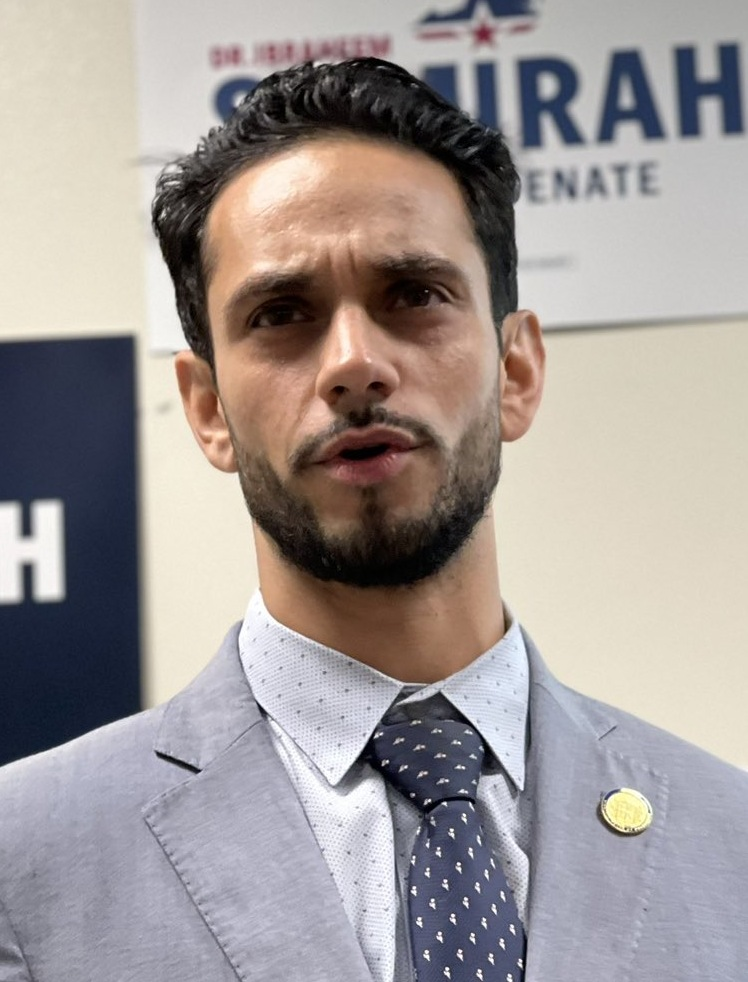

Member of the Virginia House of Delegates from the 86th district
- In office February 20, 2019 – January 12, 2022
- Preceded by: Jennifer Boysko
- Succeeded by: Irene Shin

Personal details
- Born: August 20, 1991 (age 35) Chicago, Illinois, U.S.
- Party: Democratic
- Education: American University (BA); Boston University (DMD)
- Occupation: Dentist

Ibraheem S. Samirah (born August 20, 1991) is a Jordanian-Palestinian American politician. He served as a member of the Virginia House of Delegates from the 86th district from 2019 to 2022. First elected in a special election, his election and term were marked by controversy due to anti-semitic comments. He was defeated for re-election in the Democratic primary by Irene Shin in June 2021. Following his 2021 defeat, he has made three unsuccessful attempts to return to public office losing in the Democratic Primary each time.

== Early life and education ==
Samirah was born in Chicago on August 20, 1991, to Jordanian-Palestinian parents. Samirah's grandparents were Palestinian. He has described his father as a community activist in the Muslim community. In 2003 when Samirah was 11, his father was denied re-entry into the United States as a national security risk. This resulted in the family moving to Amman, Jordan.

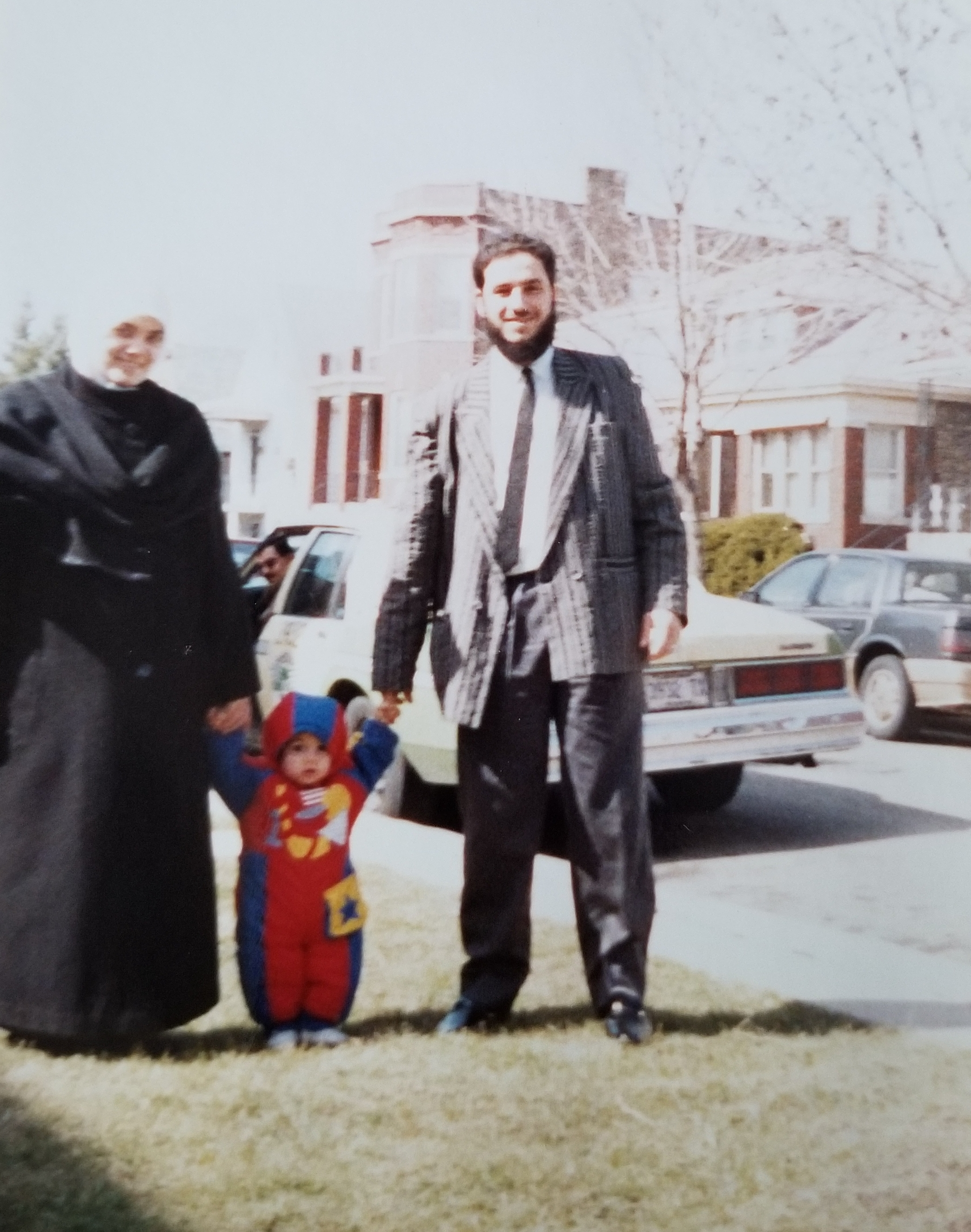
Samirah with his parents

In 2013, Samirah graduated with a Bachelor of Arts degree in government and political science from American University. He co-founded a Jewish Voice for Peace chapter at the school and was an observant Muslim throughout college.

He earned his Doctor of Dental Medicine (DMD) from the Henry M. Goldman School of Dental Medicine at Boston University in 2017. Samirah was a member of Students for Justice in Palestine in Boston.

== Career ==
=== House of Delegates ===
==== 2019 Election ====
After Delegate Jennifer Boysko was elected to the Senate of Virginia, Samirah ran for her vacant seat in the Virginia House of Delegates, winning a special election in February 2019. In July 2019, he heckled a speech by Donald Trump. He ran for reelection unopposed that November. In the 2020 session, Samirah backed a bill to allow for expanded absentee voting and recognize election day as a state holiday.

==== Claim of Islamophobia ====
In a town hall after his election, he was asked by a constituent whether he planned to implement Sharia law leading Samirah to claim that his faith had been attacked. Over two dozen protesters, some with anti-abortion and pro-Israel signs, protested outside during the town hall.

==== 2021 defeat ====
He drew a challenger in the Democratic primary in 2021 and was defeated by non-profit organizer Irene Shin who went on to win the general election. Following his defeat, in October 2021, he posted on social media accusing Mossad of creating fossil fuel wars.

=== 2023 unsuccessful State Senate campaign ===
In 2023, Samirah ran for the Virginia State Senate in the Democratic primary for Virginia's 32nd State Senate District. He was overwhelmingly defeated in the Democratic primary by Del. Suhas Subramanyam who went on to win the general election.

=== 2024 unsuccessful State Senate campaign ===
In 2024, after Suhas Subramanyam's election to the United States House of Representatives, Samirah ran to replace his seat in a firehouse primary held on November 16, 2024, losing to Del. Kannan Srinivasan.

=== 2024 failed State House comeback attempt ===
After losing his campaign for State Senate, Samirah attempted another comeback running for House District 26 in the same year. His residency in the district was questioned during the campaign. JJ Singh won the election with Samirah coming in third.

== Controversies ==
In 2014, Samirah made a series of anti-Israel posts on his Facebook account. One post reshared a letter which stated that funding Israel is like supporting the Ku Klux Klan. On another post, Samirah wrote in response to the death of former prime minister of Israel Ariel Sharon that “hell is excited to have you.” Samirah issued an apology for these posts in 2019 after a right-leaning website, which also broke news that led to the 2019 Virginia political crisis, publicized the posts. After he was defeated in the primary in 2021, he posted on social media accusing Mossad of creating fossil fuel wars.

In October 2021, Samirah supported a decision by the Washington, D.C., chapter of the Sunrise Movement to withdraw from a voting-rights rally due to the participation of Zionist organizations. He also wrote on social media that the Mossad "creates fossil fuel wars" through the use of misleading intelligence, citing the Iraq War and other Middle East conflicts. In later statements, Samirah argued that conflating Judaism with Zionism was itself antisemitic and said his comments were directed at Israeli state policy.

In 2025, Samirah pleaded guilty in federal court to one count of wire fraud related to an $83,000 Paycheck Protection Program loan he obtained in 2020 for his dental practice. According to court documents, he certified that the practice had four employees and a substantial payroll, although it did not have paid staff at the time. He submitted and backdated payroll and tax records and later sought loan forgiveness based on that documentation. At sentencing, Samirah described the loan as a poor decision made under financial pressure and said he had misunderstood the program's requirements. He was sentenced to three years of probation and ordered to pay $88,000 in restitution.

== Electoral history ==
=== February 2019 special election ===
After Jennifer Boysko was elected to the Senate of Virginia, Samirah ran in the special election to complete the remainder of her term in February 2019.

Date	Election	Candidate	Party	Votes	%
Virginia House of Delegates, 86th district
January 12, 2019	Democratic primary	Ibraheem S. Samirah		733	35.8
January 12, 2019	Democratic primary	Kofi Annan		615	30.0
January 12, 2019	Democratic primary	Mike O'Reilly		503	24.6
January 12, 2019	Democratic primary	Chad Thompson		196	9.6
February 19, 2019	Special	Ibraheem S. Samirah	Democratic	3,740	59.5
February 19, 2019	Special	Gregg G. Nelson	Republican	2,162	34.4
February 19, 2019	Special	Connie H. Hutchinson	Independent	370	5.9
February 19, 2019	Special	Write Ins		13	0.2
February 19, 2019	Special	Jennifer Boysko resigned; seat stayed Democratic			

=== 2019 general election ===
Following his win in the 2019 special election, Samirah was unopposed for reelection in the November general election.

Date	Election	Candidate	Party	Votes	%
Virginia House of Delegates, 86th district
November 5, 2019	General	Ibraheem S. Samirah	Democratic	14,730	88.9
November 5, 2019	General	Write Ins		1,836	11.1

=== 2021 general election primary ===
Samirah filed for reelection in 2021. However, he was defeated in the Democratic primary by Irene Shin.

Date	Election	Candidate	Votes	%
Virginia House of Delegates, 86th district
June 8, 2021	Democratic primary	Irene Shin	3,415	51.7
June 8, 2021	Democratic primary	Ibraheem S. Samirah	3,185	48.3

=== 2023 general election ===
Samirah unsuccessfully ran for State Senate in 2023 and was defeated in the primary by Suhas Subramanyam.

Date	Election	Candidate	Votes	%
Virginia State Senate, 32nd district
June 20, 2023	Democratic primary	Suhas Subramanyam	11,178	73.7
June 20, 2023	Democratic primary	Ibraheem S. Samirah	4,000	26.4

=== 2024 special election ===
After Suhas Subramanyam's election to the United States House of Representatives, a special election was held for his vacant seat.

Date	Election	Candidate	Votes	%
Virginia House of Delegates, 32nd district
November 13, 2024	Democratic primary	Kannan Srinivasan	2,698	44.5%
November 13, 2024	Democratic primary	Ibraheem Samirah	1,288	21.2%
November 13, 2024	Democratic primary	Buta Biberaj	823	13.6%
November 13, 2024	Democratic primary	Sreedhar Nagireddi	574	9.5%
November 13, 2024	Democratic primary	Hurunnessa Fariad	428	7.1%
November 13, 2024	Democratic primary	Puja Khanna	254	4.2%

== Personal life ==
Samirah lives in Sterling, Virginia.
