= 2025 Virginia gubernatorial election =

- November 4, 2025
- Turnout: 54.22% (▼0.68 pp)
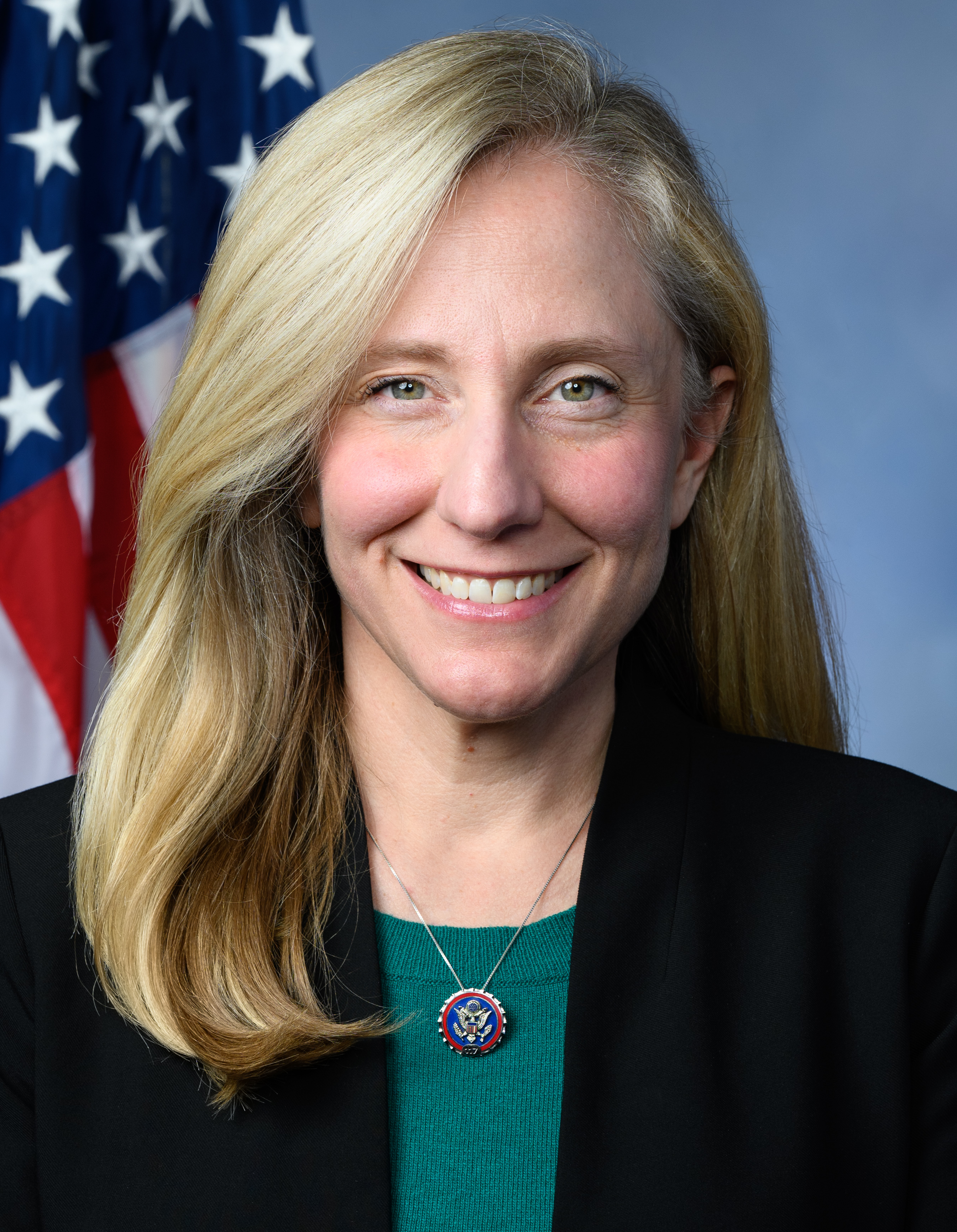

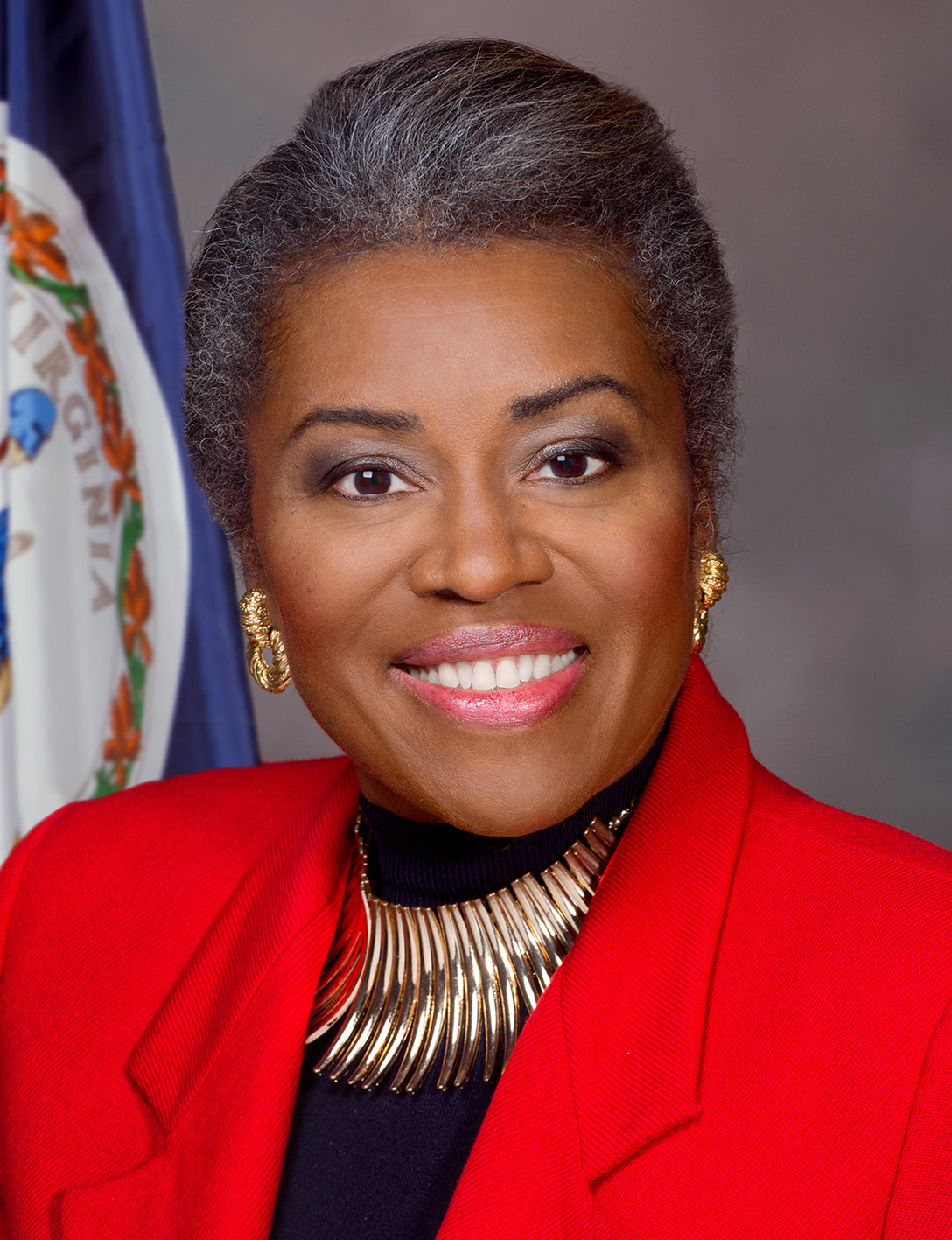
Nominee	Abigail Spanberger	Winsome Earle-Sears
Party	Democratic	Republican
Popular vote	1,976,857	1,449,586
Percentage	57.58%	42.22%
- Spanberger: 40–50% 50–60% 60–70% 70–80% 80–90% >90% Earle-Sears: 40–50% 50–60% 60–70% 70–80% 80–90% >90% Tie: 50% No votes
Governor before election
Glenn Youngkin
Republican
Elected Governor
Abigail Spanberger
Democratic

The 2025 Virginia gubernatorial election was held on November 4, 2025, to elect the governor of Virginia. Democratic former congresswoman Abigail Spanberger defeated Republican lieutenant governor Winsome Earle-Sears. Spanberger succeeded Republican incumbent Glenn Youngkin, who was term-limited and ineligible to seek a second consecutive term.

Earle-Sears and Spanberger ran unopposed in their respective party primaries. In April 2025, they were confirmed as the major party nominees. The central issues of the campaign were the economy and affordability, which included the federal layoffs from the Trump administration. Transgender rights and political rhetoric were secondary issues. President Donald Trump's approval and perceived performance on the economy, healthcare, immigration, and other issues were viewed as contributing factors for Earle-Sears's loss.

Spanberger won the general election by 15.36%—the largest gubernatorial percentage margin since 2009. Democrats flipped all three statewide executive offices and expanded their majority in the House of Delegates, creating a Democratic trifecta in Virginia's government for the first time since 2019. Spanberger was elected the first female governor of the state, winning by the largest Democratic gubernatorial margin since 1961. She was sworn in as the 75th governor of Virginia on January 17, 2026.

== Background ==
In the 2021 gubernatorial election, Youngkin defeated former governor Terry McAuliffe by two points, after Joe Biden won the state in 2020 by 10 points. The central issues of the election were the economy and education. In that election, Republicans flipped the three statewide executive offices and the House of Delegates. In the 2023 legislative elections, Democrats narrowly flipped the House of Delegates and maintained control of the Senate. Youngkin, who had a 20% net approval, was ineligible to run for re-election to a second consecutive term due to term limits set in the Virginia Constitution.

In the 2024 presidential election, Republican former president Donald Trump was re-elected, which Democrats hoped would energize their voter base in the off-year elections. Trump's personal popularity and voters' position on the economy were viewed as crucial to which party would win the election. In January 2025, Trump and Elon Musk introduced the Department of Government Efficiency. (Note: Commonly referred to as DOGE) DOGE laid off thousands of federal workers, mainly in Northern Virginia and Hampton Roads, where 140,000 federal workers resided.

Due to Virginia's Democratic lean, the state was viewed as a likely gubernatorial pickup for Democrats while national circumstances were unfavorable for Republicans. With the exception of 2013, Virginia has not elected a governor from the same party as the incumbent president since 1977. The economy was described as the top issue for voters, while healthcare and education followed. There were economic concerns over tariffs and federal cuts from the Trump administration.

== Republican primary ==
=== Candidates ===
==== Nominee ====
- Winsome Earle-Sears, lieutenant governor of Virginia (2022–2026)

==== Disqualified ====
- Amanda Chase, former state senator from SD-11 (2016–2024), and candidate for governor in 2021
- Dave LaRock, former state delegate from HD-33 (2014–2024)

==== Declined ====
- Jason Miyares, attorney general of Virginia (2022–2026) (ran for re-election)
- Rob Wittman, U.S. representative from VA-01 (2007–present) (running for re-election in 2026)

=== Campaign ===
On September 4, 2024, Winsome Earle-Sears declared her candidacy for governor. She was criticized by attorney general Jason Miyares, who was viewed as a potential candidate, for making her announcement ahead of the 2024 elections. After the 2024 elections, Miyares declined to run for governor, with Earle-Sears being described as the presumptive nominee.

On February 27, former state senator Amanda Chase and former state delegate Dave LaRock entered the primary in opposition to Earle-Sears. They associated themselves with President Trump and criticized Earle-Sears's previous comments about him. Despite the newfound opposition, Earle-Sears was still viewed as the favorite in the primary.

Neither Chase nor LaRock was able to qualify for the primary ballot. Earle-Sears was subsequently announced as the Republican nominee on April 5.

=== Endorsements ===
Amanda Chase (disqualified)

State legislators

- Doug Mastriano, Pennsylvania's SD-33 (2019–present)

=== Polling ===
Hypothetical polling

Poll source	Date(s) administered	Sample size (Note: Key: A – all adults RV – registered voters LV – likely voters V – unclear)	Margin of error	Jason Miyares	Winsome Earle-Sears	Undecided
Cygnal (R)	October 27–29, 2024	600 (LV)	± 4.0%	12%	48%	40%
Cygnal (R)	March 13–14, 2024	510 (LV)	± 4.3%	16%	44%	41%
Differentiators Data	February 21–24, 2023	500 (LV)	± 4.5%	17%	48%	35%

=== Fundraising ===
Primary campaign finance activity through March 31, 2025
Candidate	Raised	Spent	Cash on hand
Winsome Earle-Sears	$5,677,456	$1,630,867	$4,046,590
Amanda Chase (failed to qualify)	$34,835	$51,204	$1,538
Dave LaRock (failed to qualify)	$26,874	$25,813	$1,060
Source: Virginia Public Access Project

== Democratic primary ==
=== Candidates ===
==== Nominee ====
- Abigail Spanberger, former U.S. representative from VA-07 (2019–2025)

==== Withdrawn ====
- Levar Stoney, mayor of Richmond (2017–2025) (ran for lieutenant governor)

==== Declined ====
- Bobby Scott, U.S. representative from VA-03 (1993–present)

=== Campaign ===
In 2020, Governor Ralph Northam encouraged Abigail Spanberger to eventually run for governor. On November 13, 2023, she announced her candidacy and did not run for re-election in the House of Representatives in 2024.

In December 2023, Richmond mayor Levar Stoney declared his candidacy. Despite Stoney's candidacy, Spanberger was viewed as the favorite to win the primary due to his low statewide name recognition. There was private pressure from Democrats for Stoney to withdraw from the race to allow Spanberger to win the nomination. In April 2024, Stoney withdrew from the race to "avoid a costly and damaging primary" and unsuccessfully ran for lieutenant governor.

In December 2024, U.S. representative Bobby Scott, explored the possibility of running for governor, despite doubt from internal sources over whether he would actually do so. In February 2025, Scott hinted he would not run for governor and ultimately did not file a candidacy. On April 3, Spanberger secured the Democratic nomination after no other candidacies were filed.

=== Endorsements ===
Bobby Scott (declined)

State legislators

- Louise Lucas, president pro tempore of the Virginia Senate (2020–present) from SD-18 (1992–present) (previously endorsed Stoney)
Levar Stoney (withdrawn)

Statewide officials

- Terry McAuliffe, former governor of Virginia (2014–2018), and nominee for governor in 2021
- Molly Joseph Ward, former Virginia secretary of natural resources (2014–2018)

State legislators

- Louise Lucas, president pro tempore of the Virginia Senate (2020–present) from SD-18 (1992–present)
- 3 state senators (Note: Lamont Bagby, SD-09 (2023–present); Creigh Deeds, SD-11 (2001–present); Mamie Locke, SD-02 (2004–present))
- 1 state delegate (Note: Michael Jones HD-77 (2024–present))

Local officials

- Sherman Lea, mayor of Roanoke (2016–present)

=== Polling ===
Poll source	Date(s) administered	Sample size	Margin of error	Abigail Spanberger	Levar Stoney	Undecided
	April 22, 2024	Stoney withdraws from the race				
Public Policy Polling (D) (Note: Poll sponsored by Stoney's campaign)	March 25–26, 2024	734 (LV)	—	44%	11%	45%
Christopher Newport University	January 11–16, 2024	1000 (RV)	± 3.7%	52%	8%	40%

=== Fundraising ===
Primary campaign finance activity through March 31, 2025
Candidate	Raised	Spent	Cash on hand
Abigail Spanberger	$16,301,998	$5,297,212	$11,004,790
Source: Virginia Public Access Project

== Third parties and independents ==
=== Candidates ===
==== Withdrawn ====
- Donna Charles (write-in candidate), former U.S. Air Force officer and federal civil servant (endorsed Spanberger)

== General election ==
=== Campaign ===
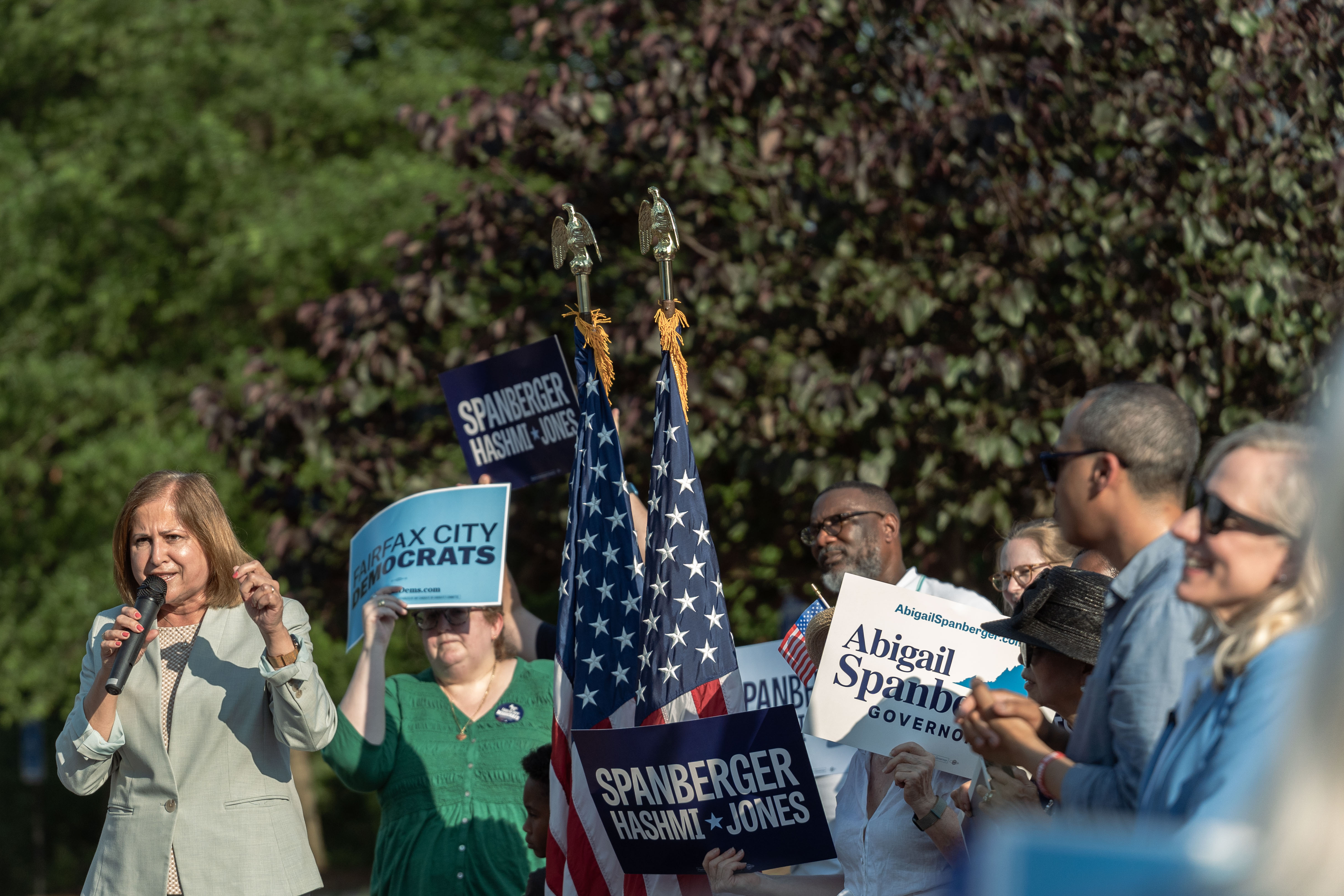
Ghazala Hashmi speaking at a bus rally in Fairfax with Jay Jones and Spanberger

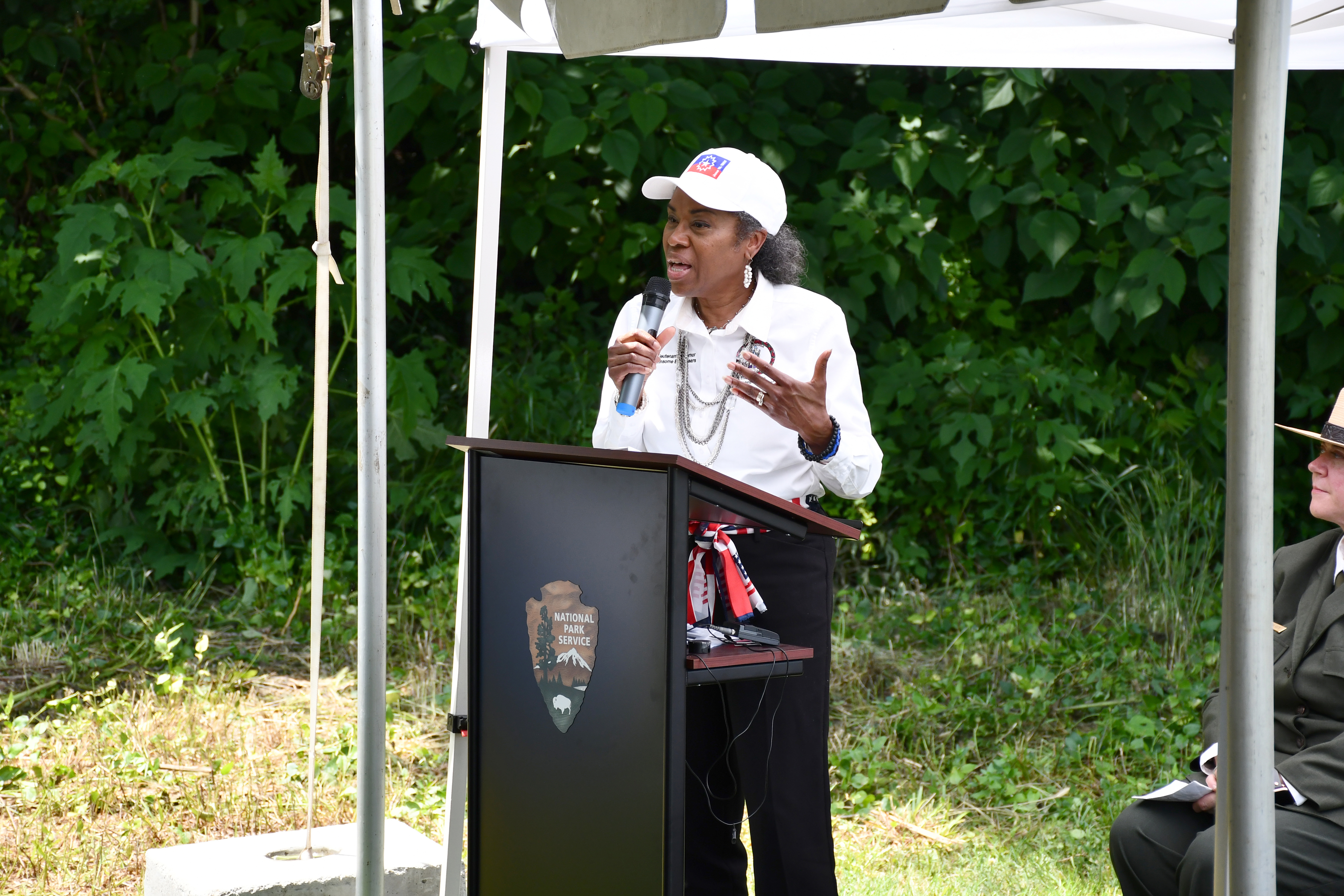
Winsome Earle-Sears speaking at Petersburg National Battlefield

This was the first gubernatorial election in the state's history in which both major party nominees were women. President Trump instated tariffs on other nations including Canada and China. The tariffs were expected to increase prices on consumer goods from companies who relied on foreign imports. Spanberger disagreed with the tariffs and said they were "... a massive tax hike on Virginians — plain and simple."

Virginia Democrats highlighted Earle-Sears's conservative positions on social issues and support for tariffs. After the June primaries, the economy emerged as the main issue for both campaigns. Spanberger's campaign message was focused on affordability: she continued to oppose federal layoffs and tariffs from the Trump administration. Earle-Sears pledged to continue Youngkin's economic policies. After Earle-Sears replaced her campaign manager, there were internal concerns from the Virginia Republican Party over how her campaign was managed. By July, Spanberger significantly outraised Earle-Sears, while there was lack of Republican investment in the race compared to 2021.

Earle-Sears's statements on federal workers throughout the campaign were criticized as "self-inflicted wounds" and supportive of President Trump's DOGE cuts. Earle-Sears began to focus on transgender policies in Northern Virginia's schools, which mirrored Youngkin's focus on critical race theory in 2021. On August 21, Earle-Sears's speech at an Arlington County School Board meeting received protests. One protest sign stated, "Hey Winsome, if trans [sic] can't share your bathroom, then Blacks can't share my water fountain." The sign received media attention and condemnation from Spanberger and Earle-Sears. Spanberger continued to campaign on affordability issues, which remained the top issue for voters. She campaigned in Southwest Virginia and attempted to win over rural voters who voted Trump in 2024. By October, Earle-Sears ran mainly on anti-transgender policies in schools. Earle-Sears ran attack ads against Spanberger which resembled the "Kamala is for they/them" ad from the 2024 presidential election. She spent $2 million on anti-transgender and anti-woke ads, which made up a significant portion of her campaign advertisements.

On October 1, a federal government shutdown began, which further affected federal workers and became a central issue by the end of the campaign. According to several polls, the Republican Party was largely blamed for the shutdown. Both Spanberger and Earle-Sears opposed the shutdown, while Spanberger tied the shutdown to President Trump's policies on federal workers. Political violence became another central issue to the campaign after the Charlie Kirk assassination, which Republicans hoped would energize low-turnout voters. The conservative National Review released text messages from Jay Jones—the Democratic nominee for attorney general—which referred to former Republican speaker Todd Gilbert: "If those guys die before me...I will go to their funerals to piss on their graves." He also stated, "Three people, two bullets. Gilbert, hitler, and pol pot. Gilbert gets two bullets to the head. Spoiler: put Gilbert in the crew with the two worst people you know and he receives both bullets every time." He reportedly fantasized about the death of Gilbert's children.

The text messages were criticized by President Trump, Glenn Youngkin, and other prominent Republicans officials who called for Jones to withdraw from the race. Spanberger condemned the text messages but did not call for him to withdraw from the race. Earle-Sears attempted to tie Jones to Spanberger and spent $1 million on attack ads, which criticized Spanberger's stance on Jones' text messages. Democrats largely defended Spanberger's response to the messages, while the messages themselves received significant media attention. At James Madison University's football game, one fan shouted at Earle-Sears, "Go back to Haiti." The event received condemnation from the university, and the fan was banned from the university.

Former president Barack Obama appeared in two ads for Spanberger's campaign which highlighted abortion rights and economic issues. Obama further criticized President Trump's policies. Other national figures campaigned for Spanberger, including Pete Buttigieg, Andy Beshear, Ruben Gallego, Josh Shapiro, and Wes Moore. Obama and Spanberger held a high-profile rally in Norfolk known as the "Virginia Votes Rally." Obama's speech focused on the economy, democracy, and Trump—most of Spanberger's advertisements continued to tie Earle-Sears to Trump. Trump did not campaign with nor officially endorse Earle-Sears; however, he did support her over Spanberger.

=== Debate ===
Both Spanberger and Earle-Sears initially declined to debate. In August, they agreed to meet on October 9 at Norfolk State University for one televised debate.

Topics discussed during the debate included repeal of the car tax, political violence and rhetoric, the federal government shutdown, economic policies on data centers, affordability, transgender policies in schools, reproductive rights, immigration, education, and marijuana legalization. Earle-Sears's debate style was described as "aggressive" as she frequently interrupted Spanberger. Spanberger sometimes "simply stood silent" and did not answer Earle-Sears's questions directed toward her. Earle-Sears made Jay Jones's messages and transgender policies a central part of her messaging.

Spanberger condemned Jones's text messages but did not call for him to withdraw from the race. She declined to state if she would renew her endorsement of Jones. Earle-Sears pressured Spanberger to call for Jones to withdraw from the race. Both candidates attacked each other on political violence and rhetoric. On education, Earle-Sears called for policies that would ban transgender students from bathrooms and sports which do not conform to their birth sex; Spanberger called for local control over transgender policies in schools. Both Earle-Sears and Spanberger called for bipartisan support to end the shutdown.

Earle-Sears, who was not endorsed by Trump, stated, "I will take all endorsements, including the president." According to CNN, Spanberger "went on offense" when she said Earle-Sears previously opposed same-sex marriage; Earle-Sears responded by saying, "That's not discrimination."

==== Analysis ====
Political analyst David Richards said Spanberger won the debate: "Earle-Sears' attempts to drag Spanberger into the Jay Jones scandal were unsuccessful. Overall, I'd give Spanberger a small edge because she seemed calmer and more professional." On their separate performances, Richards stated, "Spanberger held her own and came off as much more polished and capable, if not a little cold. Earle-Sears often came across as slightly unhinged."

When Earle-Sears was asked in an October interview about her debate response where she said, "That's not discrimination", Earle-Sears replied, "I was thinking that I was saying, 'I'm not discriminating.'"

2025 Virginia gubernatorial debate
No.	Date	Host	Moderators	Link	Republican	Democratic
Key: P Participant A Absent N Not invited I Invited W Withdrawn						
Key: P Participant A Absent N Not invited I Invited W Withdrawn					Earle-Sears	Spanberger
1	October 9, 2025	WAVY-TV; Norfolk State University	Deanna Albrittin; Tom Schaad		P	P

=== Predictions ===
Source	Ranking	As of
The Cook Political Report	Likely D (flip)	September 11, 2025
Inside Elections	Lean D (flip)	August 28, 2025
Sabato's Crystal Ball	Likely D (flip)	September 4, 2025
State Navigate	Solid D (flip)	August 22, 2025

=== Endorsements ===
Winsome Earle-Sears (R)

U.S. representatives

- Byron Donalds, FL-19 (2021–present)
- Thelma Drake, former VA-02 (2005–2009)
- Jen Kiggans, VA-02 (2023–present)
- John McGuire, VA-05 (2025–present)
- Rob Wittman, VA-01 (2007–present)

Statewide officials

- Bob McDonnell, former governor of Virginia (2010–2014)
- Jason Miyares, attorney general of Virginia (2022–2026)
- Glenn Youngkin, governor of Virginia (2022–2026)

State legislators

- 3 state senators (Note: Tammy Brankley Mulchi, SD-09 (2024–present); Mark Obenshain, SD-02 (2004–present); David Suetterlein, SD-04 (2023–present))
- 2 state delegates (Note: A.C. Cordoza, HD-86 (2024–present); Joseph McNamara, HD-40 (2018–present))

Local officials

- 5 commonwealth's attorneys
- 82 county sheriffs
- Bobby Dyer, mayor of Virginia Beach (2018–present)

Individuals

- Vivek Ramaswamy, former CEO of Roivant Sciences and 2024 presidential candidate

Organizations

- Maggie's List
- National Federation of Independent Business Virginia
- National Right to Life Committee
- NRA Political Victory Fund
- Virginia Citizens Defense League
- Virginia College Republicans
Abigail Spanberger (D)

Executive branch officials

- Pete Buttigieg, former secretary of transportation (2021–2025)
- Barack Obama, former president of the United States (2009–2017)

U.S. senators

- Tim Kaine, Virginia (2013–present)
- Elissa Slotkin, Michigan (2025–present)
- Mark Warner, Virginia (2009–present)

U.S. representatives

- Don Beyer, VA-08 (2015–present)
- Barbara Comstock, former VA-10 (2015–2019) (Republican)
- Gerry Connolly, former VA-11 (2009–2025) (deceased)
- Jennifer McClellan, VA-4 (2023–present)
- Tom Perriello, former VA-05 (2009–2011)
- Denver Riggleman, former VA-05 (2019–2021) (Independent) (Note: Held office as a Republican)
- Suhas Subramanyam, VA-10 (2025–present)
- Eugene Vindman, VA-07 (2025–present)
- Jennifer Wexton, former VA-10 (2019–2025)

Statewide officials

- Wes Moore, governor of Maryland (2023–present)
- Ralph Northam, former governor of Virginia (2018–2022)
- Josh Shapiro, governor of Pennsylvania (2023–present)

State legislators

- Louise Lucas, president pro tempore of the Virginia Senate (2020–present) from SD-18 (1992–present)
- Don Scott, speaker of the House of Delegates (2024–present) from HD-88 (2020–present)
- 1 state senator (Note: Joe Morrissey, former SD-16 (2020–2024))

Individuals

- Bill Nye, scientist and television presenter

Labor unions

- Virginia Police Benevolent Association
- UNITE HERE
- American Federation of Government Employees

Organizations

- Armenian National Committee of America
- Brady PAC
- Clean Virginia
- End Citizens United
- EMILYs List
- Everytown for Gun Safety
- Giffords
- Human Rights Campaign
- LGBT Democrats of Virginia
- National Organization for Women
- Reproductive Freedom for All
- Virginia League of Conservation Voters
- Vote Mama
- VoteVets

=== Polling ===
Aggregate polls

Source of poll aggregation	Dates administered	Dates updated	Abigail Spanberger (D)	Winsome Earle-Sears (R)	Other/Undecided (Note: Calculated by taking the difference of 100% and all other candidates combined.)	Margin
270toWin	October 27 – November 3, 2025	November 3, 2025	53.3%	43.1%	3.6%	Spanberger +10.2%
Decision Desk HQ	through November 3, 2025	November 3, 2025	52.3%	43.1%	4.6%	Spanberger +9.2%
FiftyPlusOne	through November 3, 2025	November 3, 2025	53.1%	42.4%	4.5%	Spanberger +10.7%
RealClearPolitics	October 16 – November 3, 2025	November 3, 2025	52.9%	42.7%	4.4%	Spanberger +10.2%
Average			52.9%	42.8%	4.3%	Spanberger +10.1%

Poll source	Date(s) administered	Sample size	Margin of error	Winsome Earle-Sears (R)	Abigail Spanberger (D)	Other	Undecided
Quantus Insights (R)	November 3, 2025	1,201 (LV)	± 2.7%	44%	53%	1%	2%
InsiderAdvantage (R)	November 2–3, 2025	800 (LV)	± 3.5%	40%	50%	5% (Note: Donna Charles with 5%)	5%
Research Co.	November 2–3, 2025	423 (LV)	± 4.6%	46%	54%	–	–
Research Co.	November 2–3, 2025	450 (LV)	± 4.6%	43%	51%	–	6%
The Trafalgar Group (R)	November 1–2, 2025	1,057 (LV)	± 2.9%	43%	50%	1% (Note: Donna Charles with 1%)	6%
Emerson College (Note: Poll sponsored by The Hill)	October 30–31, 2025	880 (LV)	± 3.2%	44%	55%	0%	1%
Echelon Insights	October 28–31, 2025	606 (LV)	± 4.7%	43%	55%	–	2%
AtlasIntel	October 25–30, 2025	1,325 (LV)	± 3.0%	45%	54%	0% (Note: "Would not vote" with 0%)	1%
SoCal Strategies (R) (Note: Poll sponsored by Red Eagle Politics, a conservative content creator)	October 28–29, 2025	800 (LV)	–	43%	53%	–	4%
State Navigate	October 26–28, 2025	614 (LV)	± 4.0%	41%	54%	–	5%
InsiderAdvantage (R)/ The Trafalgar Group (R)	October 27–28, 2025	800 (LV)	± 3.5%	42%	46%	4% (Note: Donna Charles with 4%)	8%
Roanoke College	October 22–27, 2025	1,041 (LV)	± 4.1%	41%	51%	3% (Note: "Refused" with 2%; "Some other candidate" with 1%)	5%
YouGov	October 17–28, 2025	1,179 (LV)	± 4.0%	42%	57%	2%	–
YouGov	October 17–28, 2025	1,179 (LV)	± 4.0%	41%	55%	0%	4%
A2 Insights	October 24–26, 2025	776 (LV)	–	46%	54%	–	1%
Christopher Newport University	October 21–23, 2025	803 (LV)	± 4.1%	43%	50%	–	6%
Suffolk University	October 19–21, 2025	500 (LV)	± 4.4%	43%	52%	1% (Note: "Refused" with 1%; Donna Charles with 0%)	4%
Quantus Insights (R)	October 19–20, 2025	1,302 (RV)	± 2.8%	46%	51%	1%	2%
State Navigate	October 17–20, 2025	694 (LV)	± 4.0%	42%	55%	–	3%
The Washington Post/Schar School	October 16–20, 2025	927 (LV)	± 3.5%	42%	54%	2% (Note: "Neither" and "Would not vote" with 1%)	2%
The Washington Post/Schar School	October 16–20, 2025	927 (RV)	± 3.5%	40%	53%	5% (Note: "Neither" with 3%; "Would not vote" with 2%)	2%
Kaplan Strategies (R)	October 16–18, 2025	556 (LV)	± 4.2%	41%	51%	–	7%
co/efficient (R)	October 15–17, 2025	937 (LV)	± 3.2%	44%	49%	1%	6%
Clarity Campaign Labs (D) (Note: Poll commissioned by the Democratic Attorneys General Association)	October 14–17, 2025	958 (RV)	± 3.2%	43%	53%	–	4%
The Trafalgar Group (R)/ InsiderAdvantage (R)	October 13–15, 2025	1,039 (LV)	± 2.9%	45%	47%	1%	6%
Virginia Commonwealth University	October 6–14, 2025	842 (A)	± 4.0%	42%	49%	–	9%
The Trafalgar Group (R)	October 8–10, 2025	1,034 (LV)	± 2.9%	45%	48%	2% (Note: Donna Charles with 2%)	6%
Public Policy Polling (D) (Note: Poll commissioned by the Democratic Governors Association, which supports Spanberger)	October 7–8, 2025	558 (RV)	–	43%	52%	–	5%
Cygnal (R)	October 6–7, 2025	600 (LV)	± 4.0%	45%	49%	–	6%
Christopher Newport University	September 29 – October 1, 2025	805 (RV)	± 3.9%	42%	52%	–	6%
The Trafalgar Group (R)	September 29 – October 1, 2025	1,034 (LV)	± 2.9%	42%	47%	2%	9%
Emerson College	September 28–29, 2025	725 (LV)	± 3.6%	42%	52%	–	5%
The Washington Post/Schar School	September 25–29, 2025	1,002 (LV)	± 3.4%	43%	55%	1% (Note: "None of these" with 1%)	2%
The Washington Post/Schar School	September 25–29, 2025	1,002 (RV)	± 3.4%	40%	53%	4% (Note: "Neither" and "Would not vote" with 2%)	3%
A2 Insights	September 16–28, 2025	771 (LV)	–	45%	48%	1% (Note: "Other" with 1%)	6%
co/efficient (R)	September 22–23, 2025	1,024 (LV)	± 3.1%	43%	49%	1%	7%
OnMessage Inc. (R)	September 15–18, 2025	800 (V)	± 3.5%	45%	50%	–	5%
Christopher Newport University	September 8–14, 2025	808 (RV)	± 3.9%	40%	52%	–	8%
Cygnal (R)	September 7, 2025	– (V)	–	43%	50%	–	7%
Pulse Decision Science (R) (Note: Poll sponsored by John Reid's campaign for LT Gov)	September 3–5, 2025	512 (LV)	± 4.4%	43%	48%	1%	8%
SoCal Strategies (R) (Note: Poll sponsored by the Virginia Project)	August 31 – September 1, 2025	700 (LV)	–	41%	53%	–	6%
Virginia Commonwealth University	August 18–28, 2025	764 (RV)	± 4.1%	40%	49%	2% (Note: "Wouldn't vote" with 1%; "Someone else" with 1%)	11%
co/efficient (R)	August 23–26, 2025	1,025 (LV)	± 3.1%	43%	48%	3% (Note: Donna Charles with 3%)	7%
Roanoke College	August 11–15, 2025	702 (LV)	± 4.3%	39%	46%	1% (Note: "Some other candidate" with 1%)	14%
Wick Insights	July 9–11, 2025	1,000 (LV)	± 3.0%	40%	50%	2%	8%
American Directions Research Group/AARP	June 25–July 8, 2025	1,001 (LV)	± 3.1%	34%	49%	8% (Note: Donna Charles with 8%)	9%
Virginia Commonwealth University	June 19–July 3, 2025	806 (A)	± 4.7%	37%	49%	2%	12%
co/efficient (R) (Note: Poll sponsored by Founders Insight)	June 8–10, 2025	1,127 (LV)	± 3.1%	43%	46%	2%	9%
Roanoke College	May 12–19, 2025	609 (RV)	± 5.3%	26%	43%	3% (Note: "Some other candidate" with 3%)	28%
Pantheon Insight/HarrisX (Note: Poll sponsored by Virginia FREE)	May 9–13, 2025	1,000 (LV)	± 3.1%	48%	52%	–	–
Pantheon Insight/HarrisX	May 9–13, 2025	1,000 (LV)	± 3.1%	45%	48%	7% (Note: Denver Riggleman with 7%)	–
Cygnal (R)	February 26–28, 2025	600 (LV)	± 4.0%	40%	46%	–	14%
Roanoke College	February 17–20, 2025	690 (RV)	± 4.7%	24%	39%	4% (Note: "Someone else" with 4%)	33%
co/efficient (R) (Note: Poll sponsored by the Northern Virginia Republican Business Forum)	January 18–20, 2025	867 (LV)	± 3.3%	40%	40%	5% (Note: "Someone else" with 5%)	15%
Virginia Commonwealth University	December 18, 2024–January 15, 2025	806 (A)	± 4.7%	34%	44%	5% (Note: "Wouldn't vote" with 4%; "Someone else" with 1%)	17%
Christopher Newport University	January 6–13, 2025	806 (RV)	± 3.6%	39%	44%	6% (Note: "Someone else" with 2%. "Don't know/Refused" with 4%)	12%
Emerson College	January 6–8, 2025	1,000 (RV)	± 3.0%	41%	42%	4%	13%
Mason-Dixon Polling & Strategy	December 15–19, 2024	625 (RV)	± 4.0%	44%	47%	–	9%
Research America Inc. (Note: Poll sponsored by the University of Mary Washington)	September 3–9, 2024	1,000 (A)	± 3.1%	39%	39%	10% (Note: "None / Would not vote" with 5%; "Other candidate" with 4%; "Refused" with 1%)	12%
co/efficient (R)	September 7–10, 2023	834 (LV)	± 3.4%	26%	27%	–	47%

Hypothetical polling

Winsome Earle-Sears vs. Bobby Scott

Poll source	Date(s) administered	Sample size	Margin of error	Winsome Earle-Sears (R)	Bobby Scott (D)	Undecided
Mason-Dixon Polling & Strategy	December 15–19, 2024	625 (RV)	± 4.0%	46%	44%	10%

Jason Miyares vs. Abigail Spanberger

Poll source	Date(s) administered	Sample size	Margin of error	Jason Miyares (R)	Abigail Spanberger (D)	Undecided
Research America Inc.	September 3–9, 2024	1,000 (A)	± 3.1%	39%	40%	12%
co/efficient (R)	September 7–10, 2023	834 (LV)	± 3.4%	22%	26%	52%

== Results ==
Election turnout by county and independent city (top) and precinct (bottom):
20–30%
30–40%
40–50%
50–60%
60–70%
70–80%

2025 Virginia gubernatorial election
Party	Candidate	Votes	%	±%
Democratic	Abigail Spanberger	1,976,857	57.58%	+8.94%
Republican	Winsome Earle-Sears	1,449,586	42.22%	−8.36%
Write-in		6,897	0.20%	+0.12%
Total votes		3,433,340	100.00%	N/A
Democratic gain from Republican				

=== By county and independent city ===
Locality	Winsome Earle-Sears Republican		Abigail Spanberger Democratic		Write-in Various		Margin		Total
Locality	#	%	#	%	#	%	#	%	Total
Accomack	7,129	54.57%	5,925	45.35%	10	0.08%	−1,204	−9.22%	13,064
Albemarle	16,480	29.48%	39,322	70.35%	93	0.17%	22,842	40.87%	55,895
Alexandria	10,424	16.59%	52,230	83.11%	190	0.30%	41,806	66.52%	62,844
Alleghany	4,011	69.14%	1,779	30.67%	11	0.19%	−2,232	−38.48%	5,801
Amelia	4,521	71.08%	1,831	28.79%	8	0.13%	−2,690	−42.30%	6,360
Amherst	8,811	67.13%	4,294	32.72%	20	0.15%	−4,517	−34.42%	13,125
Appomattox	5,609	75.94%	1,765	23.90%	12	0.16%	−3,844	−52.04%	7,386
Arlington	15,929	15.96%	83,657	83.81%	235	0.24%	67,728	67.85%	99,821
Augusta	24,612	71.98%	9,522	27.85%	60	0.18%	−15,090	−44.13%	34,194
Bath	1,421	74.05%	493	25.69%	5	0.26%	−928	−48.36%	1,919
Bedford	29,166	74.27%	10,048	25.59%	57	0.15%	−19,118	−48.68%	39,271
Bland	1,974	81.64%	441	18.24%	3	0.12%	−1,533	−63.40%	2,418
Botetourt	11,820	70.27%	4,969	29.54%	32	0.19%	−6,851	−40.73%	16,821
Bristol	3,090	64.96%	1,660	34.90%	7	0.15%	−1,430	−30.06%	4,757
Brunswick	2,591	43.66%	3,338	56.25%	5	0.08%	747	12.59%	5,934
Buchanan	4,434	81.91%	971	17.94%	8	0.15%	−3,463	−63.98%	5,413
Buckingham	3,586	59.22%	2,456	40.56%	13	0.21%	−1,130	−18.66%	6,055
Buena Vista	1,392	66.38%	696	33.19%	9	0.43%	−696	−33.19%	2,097
Campbell	16,878	73.25%	6,130	26.60%	34	0.15%	−10,748	−46.65%	23,042
Caroline	6,680	49.72%	6,733	50.11%	23	0.17%	53	0.39%	13,436
Carroll	8,889	78.33%	2,433	21.44%	26	0.23%	−6,456	−56.89%	11,348
Charles City	1,485	42.53%	2,002	57.33%	5	0.14%	517	14.81%	3,492
Charlotte	3,159	67.07%	1,545	32.80%	6	0.13%	−1,614	−34.27%	4,710
Charlottesville	2,056	10.88%	16,799	88.93%	35	0.19%	14,743	78.05%	18,890
Chesapeake	42,147	43.77%	53,971	56.06%	164	0.17%	11,824	12.28%	96,282
Chesterfield	70,021	40.97%	100,595	58.86%	294	0.17%	30,574	17.89%	170,910
Clarke	4,222	55.34%	3,389	44.42%	18	0.24%	−833	−10.92%	7,629
Colonial Heights	4,092	62.12%	2,474	37.56%	21	0.32%	−1,618	−24.56%	6,587
Covington	999	59.57%	678	40.43%	0	0.00%	−321	−19.14%	1,677
Craig	1,806	79.25%	467	20.49%	6	0.26%	−1,339	−58.75%	2,279
Culpeper	12,592	57.66%	9,214	42.19%	33	0.15%	−3,378	−15.47%	21,839
Cumberland	2,609	59.03%	1,803	40.79%	8	0.18%	−806	−18.24%	4,420
Danville	4,592	37.34%	7,678	62.43%	29	0.24%	3,086	25.09%	12,299
Dickenson	3,427	76.80%	1,028	23.04%	7	0.16%	−2,399	−53.77%	4,462
Dinwiddie	7,028	58.19%	5,031	41.65%	19	0.16%	−1,997	−16.53%	12,078
Emporia	544	32.65%	1,119	67.17%	3	0.18%	575	34.51%	1,666
Essex	2,572	52.82%	2,289	47.01%	8	0.16%	−283	−5.81%	4,869
Fairfax City	2,847	27.28%	7,552	72.37%	36	0.34%	4,705	45.09%	10,435
Fairfax County	116,053	25.95%	329,977	73.78%	1,222	0.27%	213,924	47.83%	447,252
Falls Church	1,181	15.54%	6,407	84.30%	12	0.16%	5,226	68.76%	7,600
Fauquier	19,894	57.55%	14,610	42.27%	62	0.18%	−5,284	−15.29%	34,566
Floyd	4,806	64.73%	2,603	35.06%	16	0.22%	−2,203	−29.67%	7,425
Fluvanna	6,718	49.95%	6,712	49.91%	19	0.14%	−6	−0.04%	13,449
Franklin City	1,084	36.93%	1,849	63.00%	2	0.07%	765	26.06%	2,935
Franklin County	16,317	70.37%	6,836	29.48%	36	0.16%	−9,481	−40.89%	23,189
Frederick	23,130	59.32%	15,809	40.55%	51	0.13%	−7,321	−18.78%	38,990
Fredericksburg	2,943	27.93%	7,561	71.76%	33	0.31%	4,618	43.83%	10,537
Galax	1,284	68.23%	597	31.72%	1	0.05%	−687	−36.50%	1,882
Giles	4,983	73.48%	1,782	26.28%	16	0.24%	−3,201	−47.21%	6,781
Gloucester	11,399	65.73%	5,912	34.09%	30	0.17%	−5,487	−31.64%	17,341
Goochland	9,726	56.91%	7,339	42.95%	24	0.14%	−2,387	−13.97%	17,089
Grayson	4,614	78.35%	1,264	21.46%	11	0.19%	−3,350	−56.89%	5,889
Greene	5,458	57.39%	4,036	42.44%	16	0.17%	−1,422	−14.95%	9,510
Greensville	1,427	42.76%	1,902	57.00%	8	0.24%	475	14.23%	3,337
Halifax	8,027	60.26%	5,272	39.58%	22	0.17%	−2,755	−20.68%	13,321
Hampton	12,103	25.58%	35,129	74.23%	91	0.19%	23,026	48.66%	47,323
Hanover	36,278	60.10%	23,994	39.75%	95	0.16%	−12,284	−20.35%	60,367
Harrisonburg	3,654	27.70%	9,512	72.12%	23	0.17%	5,858	44.42%	13,189
Henrico	45,627	30.53%	103,559	69.30%	260	0.17%	57,932	38.76%	149,446
Henry	11,150	63.71%	6,320	36.11%	30	0.17%	−4,830	−27.60%	17,500
Highland	831	69.60%	362	30.32%	1	0.08%	−469	−39.28%	1,194
Hopewell	2,610	39.10%	4,052	60.70%	13	0.19%	1,442	21.60%	6,675
Isle of Wight	10,931	56.95%	8,227	42.86%	37	0.19%	−2,704	−14.09%	19,195
James City	19,029	44.57%	23,603	55.28%	63	0.15%	4,574	10.71%	42,695
King and Queen	1,985	60.50%	1,292	39.38%	4	0.12%	−693	−21.12%	3,281
King George	6,909	59.33%	4,716	40.50%	20	0.17%	−2,193	−18.83%	11,645
King William	6,033	66.56%	3,020	33.32%	11	0.12%	−3,013	−33.24%	9,064
Lancaster	3,283	54.44%	2,734	45.34%	13	0.22%	−549	−9.10%	6,030
Lee	5,439	84.13%	1,019	15.76%	7	0.11%	−4,420	−68.37%	6,465
Lexington	686	31.66%	1,475	68.07%	6	0.28%	789	36.41%	2,167
Loudoun	59,278	35.22%	108,594	64.52%	444	0.26%	49,316	29.30%	168,316
Louisa	11,279	59.52%	7,628	40.25%	44	0.23%	−3,651	−19.27%	18,951
Lunenburg	2,682	59.61%	1,806	40.14%	11	0.24%	−876	−19.47%	4,499
Lynchburg	13,508	50.41%	13,231	49.38%	56	0.21%	−277	−1.03%	26,795
Madison	4,259	64.01%	2,386	35.86%	9	0.14%	−1,873	−28.15%	6,654
Manassas	4,036	34.42%	7,671	65.42%	18	0.15%	3,635	31.00%	11,725
Manassas Park	1,151	28.72%	2,852	71.16%	5	0.12%	1,701	42.44%	4,008
Martinsville	1,451	36.35%	2,534	63.48%	7	0.18%	1,083	27.13%	3,992
Mathews	3,242	67.51%	1,555	32.38%	5	0.10%	−1,687	−35.13%	4,802
Mecklenburg	7,151	60.50%	4,657	39.40%	11	0.09%	−2,494	−21.10%	11,819
Middlesex	3,473	61.44%	2,174	38.46%	6	0.11%	−1,299	−22.98%	5,653
Montgomery	15,228	41.46%	21,428	58.34%	76	0.21%	6,200	16.88%	36,732
Nelson	3,828	49.55%	3,880	50.23%	17	0.22%	52	0.67%	7,725
New Kent	8,804	63.28%	5,087	36.56%	22	0.16%	−3,717	−26.72%	13,913
Newport News	17,461	30.91%	38,936	68.93%	92	0.16%	21,475	38.02%	56,489
Norfolk	15,509	24.15%	48,599	75.68%	111	0.17%	33,090	51.53%	64,219
Northampton	2,469	44.59%	3,060	55.26%	8	0.14%	591	10.67%	5,537
Northumberland	4,132	60.47%	2,685	39.29%	16	0.23%	−1,447	−21.18%	6,833
Norton	721	68.34%	332	31.47%	2	0.19%	−389	−36.87%	1,055
Nottoway	3,122	57.91%	2,258	41.88%	11	0.20%	−864	−16.03%	5,391
Orange	9,938	57.34%	7,361	42.47%	33	0.19%	−2,577	−14.87%	17,332
Page	6,940	74.39%	2,365	25.35%	24	0.26%	−4,575	−49.04%	9,329
Patrick	5,119	77.42%	1,488	22.50%	5	0.08%	−3,631	−54.92%	6,612
Petersburg	1,124	11.29%	8,811	88.46%	25	0.25%	7,687	77.18%	9,960
Pittsylvania	17,439	70.46%	7,272	29.38%	38	0.15%	−10,167	−41.08%	24,749
Poquoson	4,384	70.01%	1,862	29.73%	16	0.26%	−2,522	−40.27%	6,262
Portsmouth	8,351	26.55%	23,040	73.25%	62	0.20%	14,689	46.70%	31,453
Powhatan	11,862	69.57%	5,168	30.31%	21	0.12%	−6,694	−39.26%	17,051
Prince Edward	3,668	49.20%	3,767	50.53%	20	0.27%	99	1.33%	7,455
Prince George	7,986	58.27%	5,707	41.64%	13	0.09%	−2,279	−16.63%	13,706
Prince William	54,309	32.74%	111,198	67.03%	381	0.23%	56,889	34.29%	165,888
Pulaski	8,607	68.55%	3,927	31.28%	22	0.18%	−4,680	−37.27%	12,556
Radford	2,050	43.68%	2,632	56.08%	11	0.23%	582	12.40%	4,693
Rappahannock	2,231	55.10%	1,812	44.75%	6	0.15%	−419	−10.35%	4,049
Richmond City	11,883	13.04%	79,019	86.73%	212	0.23%	67,136	73.68%	91,114
Richmond County	1,997	63.88%	1,124	35.96%	5	0.16%	−873	−27.93%	3,126
Roanoke City	10,153	32.82%	20,700	66.91%	83	0.27%	10,547	34.09%	30,936
Roanoke County	24,728	57.66%	18,062	42.12%	97	0.23%	−6,666	−15.54%	42,887
Rockbridge	6,599	64.93%	3,557	35.00%	7	0.07%	−3,042	−29.93%	10,163
Rockingham	24,498	67.68%	11,622	32.11%	76	0.21%	−12,876	−35.57%	36,196
Russell	7,268	81.13%	1,673	18.68%	17	0.19%	−5,595	−62.46%	8,958
Salem	5,282	55.81%	4,150	43.85%	32	0.34%	−1,132	−11.96%	9,464
Scott	6,103	83.00%	1,235	16.80%	15	0.20%	−4,868	−66.20%	7,353
Shenandoah	12,488	68.53%	5,698	31.27%	37	0.20%	−6,790	−37.26%	18,223
Smyth	7,712	76.90%	2,298	22.92%	18	0.18%	−5,414	−53.99%	10,028
Southampton	4,492	60.34%	2,945	39.56%	8	0.11%	−1,547	−20.78%	7,445
Spotsylvania	29,015	48.47%	30,748	51.36%	104	0.17%	1,733	2.89%	59,867
Stafford	27,774	43.94%	35,327	55.88%	115	0.18%	7,553	11.95%	63,216
Staunton	4,236	39.10%	6,580	60.73%	18	0.17%	2,344	21.64%	10,834
Suffolk	15,935	38.20%	25,696	61.60%	80	0.19%	9,761	23.40%	41,711
Surry	1,707	47.63%	1,873	52.26%	4	0.11%	166	4.63%	3,584
Sussex	1,802	46.91%	2,035	52.98%	4	0.10%	233	6.07%	3,841
Tazewell	10,407	82.10%	2,248	17.73%	21	0.17%	−8,159	−64.37%	12,676
Virginia Beach	75,013	44.22%	94,339	55.62%	269	0.16%	19,326	11.39%	169,621
Warren	10,433	64.29%	5,757	35.47%	39	0.24%	−4,676	−28.81%	16,229
Washington	15,614	74.21%	5,382	25.58%	43	0.20%	−10,232	−48.63%	21,039
Waynesboro	4,037	47.46%	4,459	52.42%	11	0.13%	422	4.96%	8,507
Westmoreland	4,396	54.02%	3,733	45.88%	8	0.10%	−663	−8.15%	8,137
Williamsburg	1,647	24.51%	5,063	75.35%	9	0.13%	3,416	50.84%	6,719
Winchester	3,485	39.52%	5,318	60.30%	16	0.18%	1,833	20.78%	8,819
Wise	8,744	79.15%	2,281	20.65%	22	0.20%	−6,463	−58.50%	11,047
Wythe	8,426	76.29%	2,594	23.49%	24	0.22%	−5,832	−52.81%	11,044
York	15,684	49.79%	15,769	50.06%	47	0.15%	85	0.27%	31,500
Totals	1,449,586	42.22%	1,976,857	57.58%	6,897	0.20%	527,271	15.36%	3,433,340

==== Counties and independent cities that flipped from Republican to Democratic ====
- Caroline (largest municipality: Bowling Green)
- Chesapeake (independent city)
- Chesterfield (largest municipality: Chester)
- Hopewell (independent city)
- James City (largest municipality: Williamsburg)
- Montgomery (largest municipality: Blacksburg)
- Nelson (largest municipality: Nellysford)
- Northampton (largest municipality: Exmore)
- Prince Edward (largest municipality: Farmville)
- Radford (independent city)
- Spotsylvania (largest municipality: Spotsylvania Courthouse)
- Stafford (largest municipality: Aquia Harbour)
- Surry (largest municipality: Claremont)
- Virginia Beach (independent city)
- Waynesboro (independent city)
- York (largest municipality: Grafton)

==== By congressional district ====
Spanberger won eight of 11 congressional districts, including two held by Republicans.

District	Earle-Sears	Spanberger	Representative
1st	48.6%	51.2%	Rob Wittman
2nd	46.1%	53.7%	Jen Kiggans
3rd	27.9%	71.9%	Bobby Scott
4th	29.2%	70.6%	Jennifer McClellan
5th	53.5%	46.3%	John McGuire
6th	58.2%	41.6%	Ben Cline
7th	42.2%	57.6%	Eugene Vindman
8th	19.6%	80.1%	Don Beyer
9th	68.1%	31.7%	Morgan Griffith
10th	39.6%	60.1%	Suhas Subramanyam
11th	26.2%	73.5%	James Walkinshaw

== Aftermath and analysis ==
Spanberger set a record for most votes received by a gubernatorial candidate in Virginia's history. Spanberger's sizable victory was attributed to concerns over affordability, Earle-Sears' tendency to change staff and failure to find a convincing message, Spanberger's fundraising advantage, a significant decline in turnout in heavily Republican Southwest Virginia, and outrage in Northern Virginia over the mass layoffs of federal workers as part of President Donald Trump's efforts to downsize the federal government. Additionally, many furloughed federal workers were energized by the ongoing federal government shutdown. Discontentment with the U.S. economy under Trump, which many Virginians blamed on his tariff policies, also played a factor in motivating Spanberger voters. The layoffs boosted Spanberger in Northern Virginia which contributed to her large victory margin.

Northern Virginia backed 88% of her statewide margin, where every locality in the region saw her margin increase significantly from McAuliffe's performance in 2021. She could have won statewide without Northern Virginia by three points.

Spanberger did well with college-educated voters, winning voters with college degrees by 27 points (63%-36%). Many college campuses shifted leftward by 18 points on average due to young voters. Virginia Tech shifted 34 points to the left, which was the largest shift of all the college campuses. Spanberger's strongest independent city was Charlottesville, where the University of Virginia, her alma mater, is located. The evangelical Liberty University in Lynchburg shifted to the left by six points. College-educated voters made up more of the electorate compared to 2021. Spanberger narrowly won non-college-educated voters (50%-49%) despite Youngkin's 19-point margin (59%-40%) with non-college-educated voters from 2021.

This is the first time since 1985 that a Democrat carried Spotsylvania County, a notable Republican stronghold, as well as Waynesboro City. Stafford County also flipped for the first time since 1985, though Harris won Stafford in 2024. Nelson County and Caroline County also voted Democratic for the first time since 2013. James City County voted Democratic for the first time since 2005, although it voted Democratic in 2020 and 2024. Spanberger's closest victory was in York County, which voted Democratic for the first time since 1965. Spanberger improved with Latino voters from 2024.

=== Exit poll ===
2025 Virginia gubernatorial election voter demographics (CNN)
Demographic subgroup	Spanberger	Earle-Sears	% of total vote
Ideology
Liberals	96	4	33
Moderates	69	31	33
Conservatives	10	90	35
Party
Democrats	99	1	36
Republicans	7	93	31
Independents	59	40	33
Donald Trump job approval
Approve	6	94	39
Disapprove	92	7	59
Most important issue facing Virginia
Economy	63	36	48
Health care	81	18	21
Education	55	45	11
Immigration	11	89	11
2024 presidential vote
Kamala Harris	99	1	51
Donald Trump	7	93	42
Another candidate	61	36	2
Did not vote	61	39	3
Gender
Men	48	51	47
Women	65	35	53
Income
$200,000 or more	64	36	14
$100,000-$199,999	51	48	28
$50,000-$99,999	58	42	31
Less than $50,000	63	37	26
Race/ethnicity
White	47	53	71
Asian	80	20	4
Latino	67	33	5
Black	93	7	16
White born-again or evangelical Christian?
Yes	20	80	28
No	71	29	72
Race by gender
White men	38	61	34
White women	54	46	36
Black men	89	11	7
Black women	96	3	9
Latino men	53	47	2
Latina women	78	22	2
All other voters	73	27	9
Age
18–29 years old	70	29	13
30–44 years old	62	38	20
45-64 years old	55	45	35
65 and older	51	49	32
Area type
Urban	66	34	19
Suburban	59	41	57
Rural	46	54	24
Education
College graduate	63	36	52
No college degree	50	49	48
Education by race
White college graduates	57	43	38
Non-white college graduates	80	19	14
Whites without college	34	66	33
Non-whites without college	85	15	15
Education by gender and race
White women with college degrees	65	35	20
White women without college degrees	39	60	16
White men with college degrees	48	52	18
White men without college degrees	29	71	17
Voters of color	83	17	30
Educational attainment
Advanced degree	68	32	23
Bachelor's degree	60	40	29
Associate's degree	53	47	10
Some college	55	45	17
Never attended college	46	54	21

== See also ==
- 2025 United States elections
- 2025 Virginia elections
- 2025 Virginia lieutenant gubernatorial election
- 2025 Virginia Attorney General election
- 2025 Virginia House of Delegates election

== Notes ==
Partisan clients
