= 1965 Virginia lieutenant gubernatorial election =

- November 2, 1965
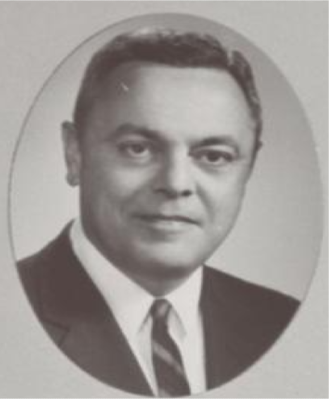

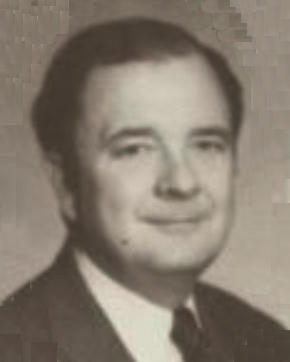

Nominee	Fred G. Pollard	Vincent F. Callahan	Reid T. Putney
Party	Democratic	Republican	Conservative
Popular vote	272,425	202,053	69,941
Percentage	50.04%	37.11%	12.85%
- County and independent city results Pollard: 30–40% 40–50% 50–60% 60–70% 70–80% 80–90% Callahan: 30–40% 40–50% 50–60% 60–70% Putney: 30–40% 40–50% 50–60%
Lieutenant Governor before election
Mills Godwin
Democratic
Elected Lieutenant Governor
Fred G. Pollard
Democratic

The 1965 Virginia lieutenant gubernatorial election was held on November 2, 1965, in order to elect the lieutenant governor of Virginia. Democratic nominee and incumbent member of the Virginia House of Delegates Fred G. Pollard defeated Republican nominee Vincent F. Callahan and Conservative nominee Reid T. Putney.

== General election ==
On election day, November 2, 1965, Democratic nominee Fred G. Pollard won the election by a margin of 70,372 votes against his foremost opponent Republican nominee Vincent F. Callahan, thereby retaining Democratic control over the office of lieutenant governor. Pollard was sworn in as the 29th lieutenant governor of Virginia on January 20, 1966.

=== Results ===
Virginia lieutenant gubernatorial election, 1965
Party	Candidate	Votes	%
Democratic	Fred G. Pollard	272,425	50.04
Republican	Vincent F. Callahan	202,053	37.11
Conservative	Reid T. Putney	69,941	12.85
Total votes		544,419	100.00
Democratic hold			
