= 2019 Virginia elections =

- November 5, 2019

The 2019 Virginia elections took place on November 5, 2019. All 40 seats of the Senate of Virginia and 100 seats in the Virginia House of Delegates were up for re-election, as were many local offices.

As of June 30, 2018, incumbents in both parties were out-raising their challengers, and there was a brisk pace of fundraising among Northern Virginia incumbents. A U.S. District Court for the Eastern District of Virginia panel had chosen a redistricting map that was expected to favor Democrats in some key districts, including those of Kirk Cox, House Speaker, and Chris Jones, chairman of the House Appropriations Committee.

The Democratic Party won majorities in both the House of Delegates and the Senate, giving them control of both houses and the governor's mansion in Virginia for the first time since 1994.

== Special elections ==
Following Democrat Jennifer Wexton's 2018 election to represent Virginia's 10th congressional district, a special election was held on January 8, 2019, to fill the 33rd Virginia Senate district seat she was vacating. Democrat Jennifer Boysko defeated Republican Joe May. The seat she vacated, 86th Virginia House of Delegates district, held a special election on February 19, 2019, which was won by Democrat Ibraheem Samirah.

== Senate ==
According to official results, Democrats won 21 seats in the Senate, while Republicans won 19. This gives the Democrats the net gain of 2 seats they needed to take the chamber.

== House ==
According to official results, Democrats won 55 seats, enough for a majority, while Republicans won 45 seats.

== Municipal elections ==
=== County Board of Supervisors ===
All 95 counties in Virginia in Virginia had at least one Board of Supervisor member up for election or reelection in 2019. Juli Briskman, who had been fired from her job for giving the finger to the motorcade of Donald Trump, was elected to the board of supervisors for Loudoun County, Virginia.

=== Soil and Water Directors ===
Ninety-four of the 95 counties in Virginia (Arlington County being the exception) elected Soil and Water Directors in 2019.

=== Town Council ===
Twelve of Virginia's 190 towns had town council elections in 2019.

=== City School Board ===
Four of Virginia's 38 cities elected school board members in 2019. These cities are Alexandria, Buena Vista, Charlottesville, and Falls Church.

=== County School Board ===
All 95 counties in Virginia elected school board members in 2019.

== See also ==
- 2019 Virginia House of Delegates election
- 2019 Virginia Senate election
