= Kannan Srinivasan =

American politician from Virginia

- Srinivasan in 2026

Member of the Virginia Senate from the 32nd district
- Incumbent
- Assumed office January 15, 2025
- Preceded by: Suhas Subramanyam

Member of the Virginia House of Delegates from the 26th district
- In office January 10, 2024 – January 7, 2025
- Preceded by: Tony Wilt
- Succeeded by: Jas Jeet Singh

Personal details
- Born: August 24, 1966 (age 60) Chennai, India
- Party: Democratic
- Education: Old Dominion University (MS)

Kannan Srinivasan (born August 24, 1966) is an American politician from Virginia. In 2023, he was elected to the Virginia House of Delegates, serving as the first Indian American immigrant, to represent the 26th district. He was elected to the Virginia Senate in a special election on January 7, 2025. Srinivasan currently represents District 32 in the Senate of Virginia.

== Personal life ==
Srinivasan is Tamil and a Hindu. He is the son of school teachers, married to Jayashree Sreeivasan, and resides in Loudoun County, Virginia. He is the chair of the Virginia State Medicaid Board in which he was appointed by Governor Terry McAuliffe in 2017 and re-appointed by Governor Ralph Northam in 2021.

== Electoral history ==
Loudoun County Treasurer general election, 2019
Party	Candidate	Votes	%
Republican	Harold Roger Zurn Jr.	65,166	57.6%
Democratic	Kannan Srinivasan	47,824	42.3%
Total votes		113,100	100.0%

Virginia House of Delegates Democratic primary election: 26th District, 2023
Party	Candidate	Votes	%
Democratic	Kannan Srinivasan	3,788	67.8%
Democratic	Sirisha Kompalli	1,800	32.2%
Total votes		5,588	100.0%

Virginia House of Delegates Special General Election: 26th District, 2023
Party	Candidate	Votes	%
Democratic	Kannan Srinivasan	13,119	60.9%
Republican	Rafi M. Khaja	8,362	38.8%
Write-in		66	0.3%
Total votes		21,547	100.0%

Virginia Senate special Democratic primary election: 32nd District, 2024
Party	Candidate	Votes	%
Democratic	Kannan Srinivasan	2,698	44.5%
Democratic	Ibraheem Samirah	1,288	21.2%
Democratic	Buta Biberaj	823	13.6%
Democratic	Sreedhar Nagireddi	574	9.5%
Democratic	Hurunnessa Fariad	428	7.1%
Democratic	Puja Khanna	254	4.2%
Total votes		6,065	100%

Virginia Senate special General Election: 32nd District, 2025
Party	Candidate	Votes	%
Democratic	Kannan Srinivasan	18,825	61.8%
Republican	Tumay Harding	11,629	38.2%
Total votes		30,454	100.0%
