= Virginia's 32nd Senate district =

American legislative district

Virginia's 32nd State Senate district
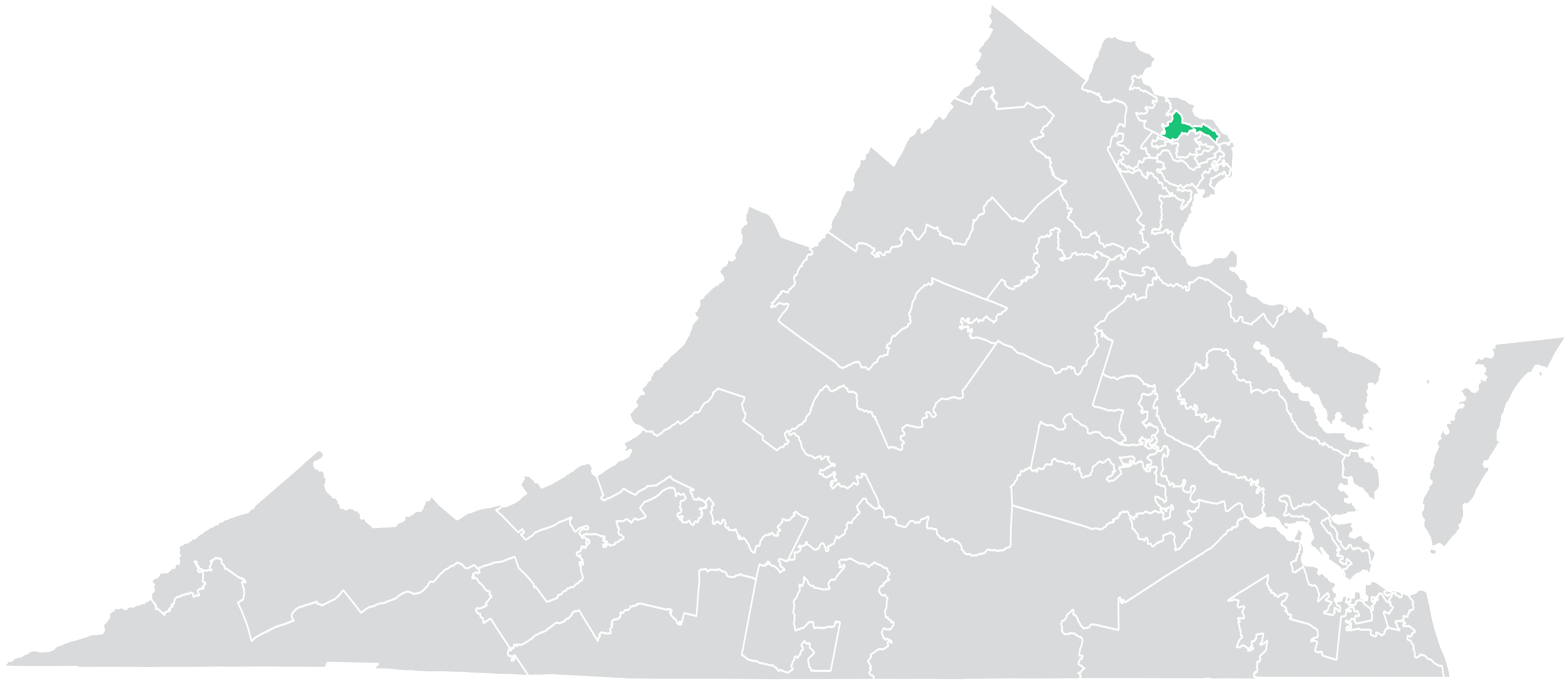
Senator
Kannan Srinivasan; D–Ashburn
- Demographics: 64% White; 5% Black; 10% Hispanic; 17% Asian; 3% Other
- Population (2019): 210,795
- Registered voters: 157,510

Virginia's 32nd Senate district is one of 40 districts in the Senate of Virginia. The seat has been represented by Kannan Srinivasan since 2025.

== Geography ==
District 32 is based in Loudoun County in the suburbs of Washington D.C.

The district overlaps with Virginia's 10th congressional district, and with the 26th, 27th, 28th, and 30th districts of the Virginia House of Delegates.

== Recent election results ==
=== 2025 ===
2025 Virginia Senate special election, District 32
Party	Candidate	Votes	%
Democratic	Kannan Srinivasan	18,825	61.7
Republican	Tumay Harding	11,629	38.1
Total votes		30,454	100
Democratic hold			

=== 2023 ===
2023 Virginia Senate election, District 32
Party	Candidate	Votes	%
Democratic	Suhas Subramanyam	36,590	60.5
Republican	Gregory Moulthrop	23,541	39.0
Total votes		66,084	100
Democratic hold			

=== 2019 ===
2019 Virginia Senate election, District 32
Party	Candidate	Votes	%
Democratic	Janet Howell (incumbent)	48,581	73.5
Republican	Arthur Purves	17,376	26.3
Total votes		66,084	100
Democratic hold			

=== 2015 ===
2015 Virginia Senate election, District 32
Party	Candidate	Votes	%
Democratic	Janet Howell (incumbent)	31,156	94.0
Total votes		33,130	100
Democratic hold			

=== 2011 ===
2011 Virginia Senate election, District 32
Party	Candidate	Votes	%
Democratic	Janet Howell (incumbent)	26,026	60.3
Republican	Patrick Forrest	17,122	39.6
Total votes		43,196	100
Democratic hold			

=== Federal and statewide results ===
Year	Office	Results
2024	President	Harris 58.8–37.2%
2020	President	Biden 70.1–28.1%
2017	Governor	Northam 71.4–27.7%
2016	President	Clinton 67.4–26.8%
2014	Senate	Warner 62.3–35.7%
2013	Governor	McAuliffe 62.9–31.6%
2012	President	Obama 60.9–38.0%
2012	Senate	Kaine 63.2–36.8%

== Historical results ==
All election results below took place prior to 2011 redistricting, and thus were under different district lines.

=== 2007 ===
2007 Virginia Senate election, District 32
Party	Candidate	Votes	%
Democratic	Janet Howell (incumbent)	28,089	97.2
Total votes		28,907	100
Democratic hold			

=== 2003 ===
2003 Virginia Senate election, District 32
Primary election
Party	Candidate	Votes	%
Republican	David Hunt	4,031	64.6
Republican	Howie Lind	2,205	35.4
Total votes		6,236	100
General election
Democratic	Janet Howell (incumbent)	21,252	56.7
Republican	David Hunt	16,214	43.3
Total votes		37,479	100
Democratic hold			

=== 1999 ===
1999 Virginia Senate election, District 32
Party	Candidate	Votes	%
Democratic	Janet Howell (incumbent)	25,966	58.2
Republican	Whitney Adams	18,615	41.7
Total votes		44,609	100
Democratic hold			

=== 1995 ===
1995 Virginia Senate election, District 32
Primary election
Party	Candidate	Votes	%
Republican	Robert M. McDowell	3,537	58.1
Republican	Pamela Danner	2,554	41.9
Total votes		6,091	100
General election
Democratic	Janet Howell (incumbent)	26,470	57.3
Republican	Robert M. McDowell	19,738	42.7
Total votes		46,220	100
Democratic hold			
