= Jas Jeet Singh =

American politician

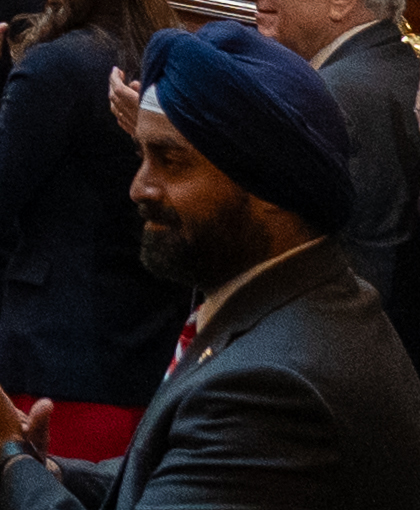

Member of the Virginia House of Delegates from the 26th district
- Incumbent
- Assumed office January 13, 2025
- Preceded by: Kannan Srinivasan

Personal details
- Born: Northern Virginia, U.S.
- Party: Democratic
- Spouse: Jessica (m. 2016)
- Education: University of Virginia (BA); Harvard University (MPA, MBA)

Jas Jeet Singh, commonly known as JJ Singh, is an American politician from Virginia. A Democrat, he was elected to the Virginia House of Delegates in a special election in 2025. Singh previously worked in the Obama administration and on Capitol Hill.

== Early life and education ==
Singh was born in Northern Virginia into a Punjabi Sikh family, and grew up in Fairfax Station. His parents immigrated to the area from India in 1970. His father Amar Jit Singh, was born in Faisalabad, Punjab Province, British India (in present-day Pakistan), and moved to Haryana, India after the partition of India.

He graduated from the University of Virginia with a Bachelor of Arts in economics in 2002, Harvard Kennedy School of Government with a Master of Public Administration, and Harvard Business School with a Master of Business Administration.

== Career ==
Singh served in the Peace Corps, being sent to Bolivia to work on cultivating small businesses and becoming the first turban-wearing Sikh to join the corps. He went on to work as a credit analyst in the White House Office of Management and Budget and economic policy advisor for U.S. Senator Chris Coons. In 2014, Singh was named one of the 50 most beautiful people on Capitol Hill by The Hill.

Singh is currently President of Retreat Hotels and Resorts, also serving on the Loudoun County Economic Development Advisory Commission and as the treasurer of the Loudoun County Democratic Committee. He is an elected member of the board of the National Peace Corps Association.

== Virginia House of Delegates ==
He was elected to the Virginia's 26th House of Delegates district in a special election held on January 7, 2025, to succeed Kannan Srinivasan, a fellow Democrat who successfully sought election to the State Senate. Singh defeated Ram Venkatachalam, an information technology consultant. He is the first Sikh member of the House of Delegates in its 249-year history.
