= Virginia's 26th House of Delegates district =

Virginia legislative district

Virginia's 26th State House of Delegates district
- District map from the 2023 election
Delegate
Jas Jeet Singh; D–Ashburn
- Demographics: 37% White; 11% Black; 8% Hispanic; 38% Asian; 0% Native American; 0% Hawaiian/Pacific Islander; 1% Other
- Population (2023) • Voting age: 86,930; 18
- Registered voters (2024): 53,710

Virginia's 26th House of Delegates district elects one of 100 seats in the Virginia House of Delegates, the lower house of the state's bicameral legislature. District 26 includes part of Loudoun County in Northern Virginia. Since 2025, it has been represented by Democrat JJ Singh.

== District officeholders ==
Years	Delegate	Party	Notes
January 1996 – January 11, 2006	Glenn Weatherholtz	Republican	Retired.
January 11, 2006 – April 30, 2010	Matt Lohr	Republican	Resigned after being appointed Commissioner of the Virginia Department of Agriculture and Consumer Services
June 24, 2010 – January 9, 2024	Tony Wilt	Republican	Elected via special election. Redistricted to the 34th district.
January 10, 2024 – January 7, 2025	Kannan Srinivasan	Democratic	Resigned after being elected to the Virginia Senate in a special election.
January 13, 2025 – present	JJ Singh	Democratic	Elected via special election.

== Electoral history ==
Date	Election	Candidate	Party	Votes	%
Virginia House of Delegates, 26th district
Nov 8, 2005	General	M J Lohr	Republican	8,545	53.58
Nov 8, 2005	General	L L Fulk	Democratic	7,353	46.11
Nov 8, 2005	General	Write Ins		50	0.31
Nov 8, 2005	General	Glenn Weatherholtz retired; seat stayed Republican			
Nov 6, 2007	General	Matthew J. "Matt" Lohr	Republican	8,166	71.07
Nov 6, 2007	General	Carolyn W. Frank		3,269	28.45
Nov 6, 2007	General	Write Ins		55	0.47
Nov 3, 2009	General	Matthew J. "Matt" Lohr	Republican	11,328	73.03
Nov 3, 2009	General	A. Gene Hart, Jr.	Democratic	4,170	26.88
Nov 3, 2009	General	Write Ins		12	0.07
January 7, 2025	General	JJ Singh	Democratic	6,404	62.29
January 7, 2025	General	Ram Venkatachalam	Republican	3,857	37.52
January 7, 2025	General	Write Ins		20	0.19
