= List of mayors of Richmond, Virginia =

Mayor of Richmond
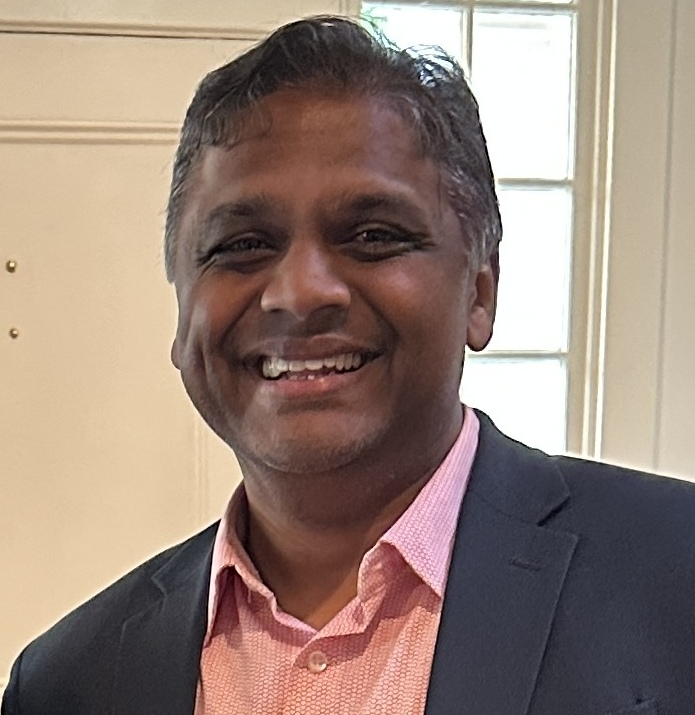
- Incumbent; Danny Avula since January 1, 2025
- Style: The Honorable
- Term length: Four years (since 2005)
- Inaugural holder: William Foushee
- Formation: July 2, 1782
- Website: Office of the Mayor

The Mayor of Richmond, Virginia is the chief executive of the government of Richmond, Virginia, as stipulated by the city's charter.

This list includes mayors who were appointed by the Richmond City Council as well as those who were elected by popular vote.

The current Mayor of Richmond, Virginia and 81st in the sequence of regular officeholders is Democrat Danny Avula, who has served in the office since January 1, 2025.

== History ==
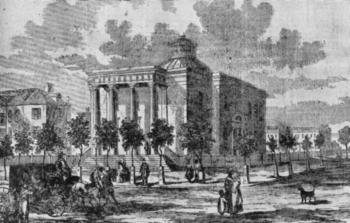
Richmond's original City Hall building, used from 1814 to 1874

The City of Richmond was founded in 1737 by William Byrd II.

In May 1782, the Virginia General Assembly expressed desire to move inland, to a place less exposed to British incursions than Williamsburg. Richmond had been made the temporary capital after urging from Thomas Jefferson years earlier, and it was soon decided to make the move permanent.

Two months later, on July 2, a charter was written up, and the city was incorporated. Twelve men were to be elected from the City at-large and were to select one of their own to act as Mayor, another to serve as Recorder and four to serve as Aldermen. The remaining six were to serve as members of the Common Council. All positions had term limits of three years, with the exception of the mayor who could only serve one year consecutively. A vote was held at a meeting the following day and Dr. William Foushee, Sr. was chosen as the first mayor.

In March 1851, the decision was made to replace the original Richmond City Charter. It was decided that all city officials were to be popularly elected. After the 12-year tenure of William Lambert and his short-term replacement by recorder Samuel T. Pulliam, elections were held, with Joseph C. Mayo coming out on top. Mayo was deposed in April 1865, weeks before the end of the American Civil War, when Union forces captured the city.

The system set forth by the Second City Charter worked as long as the city was small and most voters knew personally, the qualifications of the men for whom they were voting and the requirements for the jobs to which they were elected. Beginning in 1948, Richmond eliminated the popularly elected mayor's office, and instituted a council-manager form of government. This lasted until 2004, when the City Charter was changed once again, bringing back the popularly elected mayor. Former Virginia Governor L. Douglas Wilder was elected mayor that year. Of Virginia's 38 cities, only Richmond does not have a council-manager form of government.

== List of mayors ==
No.	Mayor	Took office	Left office	Tenure	Party	Election
=== Appointed mayors (1782–1853) ===
1	William Foushee (1749–1824)	July 3, 1782	June 30, 1783	362 days	Independent	App.
2	John J. Beckley (1757–1807); 1st time	July 1, 1783	July 6, 1784	1 year, 5 days	Independent	App.
3	Robert Mitchell (TBA–TBA); 1st time	July 7, 1784	1785	1 year	Independent	App.
4	John Harvie (1742–1807)	1785	1786	1 year	Independent	App.
5	William Pennock (TBA–TBA)	December 10, 1786	1786	<1 year	Independent	App.
6	Richard Adams (1726–1800)	1786	February 21, 1788	2 years	Independent	App.
7	John J. Beckley (1757–1807); 2nd time	February 22, 1788	March 9, 1789	1 year, 15 days	Independent	App.
8	Alexander McRobert (TBA–TBA)	March 10, 1789	March 9, 1790	364 days	Independent	App.
9	Robert Boyd (TBA–TBA)	March 10, 1790	1790	<1 year	Unknown	App.
10	George Nicholson (TBA–TBA); 1st time	1790	December 12, 1790	<1 year	Unknown	App.
11	Robert Mitchell (TBA–TBA); 2nd time	December 13, 1790	1791	1 year	Unknown	App.
12	John Barrett (TBA–TBA); 1st time	1791	1792	1 year	Unknown	App.
13	Robert Mitchell (TBA–TBA); 3rd time	1792	1793	1 year	Unknown	App.
14	John Barrett (TBA–TBA); 2nd time	1793	1794	1 year	Unknown	App.
15	Robert Mitchell (TBA–TBA); 4th time	1794	1795	1 year	Unknown	App.
16	Andrew Dunscomb (TBA–TBA)	1795	1796	1 year	Unknown	App.
17	Robert Mitchell (TBA–TBA); 5th time	1796	1797	1 year	Unknown	App.
18	James McClurg (1746–1823); 1st time	1797	1798	1 year	Unknown	App.
19	John Barrett (TBA–TBA); 3rd time	1798	1799	1 year	Unknown	App.
20	George Nicholson (TBA–TBA); 2nd time	1799	1800	1 year	Unknown	App.
21	James McClurg (1746–1823); 2nd time	1800	1801	1 year	Unknown	App.
22	William Richardson (TBA–TBA)	1801	1802	1 year	Unknown	App.
23	John Foster (TBA–TBA)	1802	1803	1 year	Unknown	App.
24	James McClurg (1746–1823); 3rd time	1803	1804	1 year	Unknown	App.
25	Robert Mitchell (TBA–TBA); 6th time	1804	1805	1 year	Unknown	App.
26	William DuVal (TBA–TBA)	1805	1806	1 year	Unknown	App.
27	Edward Carrington (1748–1810)	1806	1810	4 years	Unknown	App.
28	David Bullock (TBA–TBA)	1810	1811	1 year	Unknown	App.
29	Benjamin Tate (TBA–TBA)	1811	1812	1 year	Unknown	App.
30	Thomas Wilson (TBA–TBA); 1st time	1812	1813	1 year	Unknown	App.
31	Robert Greenhow (1761–1840)	1813	1814	1 year	Unknown	App.
32	Thomas Wilson (TBA–TBA); 2nd time	1814	1815	1 year	Unknown	App.
33	Robert Gamble (TBA–TBA)	1815	1816	1 year	Unknown	App.
34	Thomas Wilson (TBA–TBA); 3rd time	1816	1817	1 year	Unknown	App.
35	William H. Fitzwhylson (TBA–TBA)	1817	1818	1 year	Unknown	App.
36	Thomas Wilson (TBA–TBA); 4th time	1818	May 4, 1818	<1 year	Unknown	App.
37	Francis Wicker (TBA–TBA); Acting; 1st time	May 5, 1818	1819	1 year	Unknown	App.
38	John Adams (1773–1825)	1819	1825	6 years	Unknown	App.
39	Joseph Tate (TBA–TBA)	1825	1839	14 years	Unknown	App.
40	Francis Wicker (TBA–TBA); 2nd time	1839	1840	1 year	Unknown	App.
41	William Lambert (?–1852)	1840	March 23, 1852 (Note: Died in office.)	12 years	Democratic	App.
42	Samuel T. Pulliam (TBA–TBA); Interim	March 25, 1852	1853	1 year	Democratic	App.
=== Popularly elected mayors (1853–1948) ===
43	Joseph Mayo (1795–1872); 1st time	1853	April 3, 1865 (Note: Mayo surrendered Richmond to the Union Army, and Mayo was arrested and removed from office.)	12 years	Democratic	TBA
Vacant		April 3, 1865	July 3, 1865			
44	David J. Saunders (1811–1873)	July 3, 1865	April 6, 1866	277 days	Democratic	App. (Note: Saunders was appointed by Virginia Governor Francis Harrison Pierpont after Joseph Mayo's arrest.)
45	Joseph Mayo (1795–1872); 2nd time	April 7, 1866	May 4, 1868 (Note: Mayo was removed from office by Virginia military governor John Schofield.)	2 years, 27 days	Democratic	TBA
46	George Chahoon (1840–1934)	May 6, 1868	March 15, 1870	1 year, 313 days	Republican	App. (Note: Chahoon was appointed by Virginia military governor John Schofield after Joseph Mayo's second removal from office.)
47	Henry K. Ellyson (1823–1890) (Note: After Ellyson's election, Mayor Chahoon challenged the new administration's legitimacy and refused to step down. The courts ruled in Ellyson's favor, and he was declared victor of the May election but refused the office because it was tainted by skullduggery. See Richmond's Municipal War for more information.)	March 16, 1870	June 30, 1871	1 year, 106 days	Democratic	TBA
48	Anthony M. Keiley (TBA–TBA)	July 1, 1871	June 30, 1876	4 years, 365 days	Democratic	TBA
49	William C. Carrington (TBA–TBA)	July 1, 1876	June 30, 1888	11 years, 365 days	Democratic	TBA
50	James Taylor Ellyson (1847–1919)	July 1, 1888	June 30, 1894	5 years, 364 days	Democratic	TBA
51	Richard M. Taylor (TBA–TBA)	July 1, 1894	1904	10 years	Democratic	TBA
52	Carlton McCarthy (1847–1936)	September 1, 1904	August 31, 1908	3 years, 365 days	Democratic	TBA
53	David C. Richardson (1845–1928)	September 1, 1908	September 3, 1912	4 years, 2 days	Democratic	TBA
54	George Ainslie (1868–1931)	September 4, 1912	1924	12 years	Democratic	TBA
55	John Fulmer Bright (1877–1953)	1924	1940	16 years	Democratic	TBA
56	Gordon Barbour Ambler (TBA–TBA)	1940	1944	4 years	Democratic	TBA
57	William C. Herbert (TBA–TBA)	1944	September 10, 1946	2 years	Democratic	TBA
58	Horace Hall Edwards (1902–1987)	September 11, 1946	1948	2 years	Democratic	TBA
=== City Council appointed mayors (1948–2005) ===
59	W. Stirling King (TBA–TBA)	1948	1950	2 years	Democratic	App.
60	T. Nelson Parker (1898–1973)	1950	1952	2 years	Democratic	App.
61	Edward E. Haddock (1911–1996)	1952	1954	2 years	Democratic	App.
62	Thomas P. Bryan (1918–1983)	1954	1956	2 years	Democratic	App.
63	F. Henry Garber (TBA–TBA)	1956	1958	2 years	Democratic	App.
64	A. Scott Anderson (1904–1971)	1958	1960	2 years	Democratic	App.
65	Claude W. Woodward (TBA–TBA)	1960	1962	2 years	Democratic	App.
66	Eleanor P. Sheppard (1907–1991)	July 1, 1962	June 30, 1964	1 year, 365 days	Democratic	App.
67	Morrill Martin Crowe (1901–1994)	July 1, 1964	June 30, 1968	3 years, 365 days	Democratic	App.
68	Philip J. Bagley Jr. (TBA–TBA)	July 1, 1968	June 30, 1970	1 year, 364 days	Democratic	App.
69	Thomas J. Bliley Jr. (1932–2023)	July 1, 1970	March 7, 1977	6 years, 249 days	Democratic	App. (Note: Between 1972 and 1976, city council elections were not held by order of the United States Department of Justice. See City of Richmond v. United States for more information.)
70	Henry L. Marsh (1933–2025)	March 8, 1977	June 30, 1982	5 years, 114 days	Democratic	App.
71	Roy A. West (TBA–TBA)	July 1, 1982	June 30, 1988	5 years, 365 days	Democratic	App.
72	Geline B. Williams (TBA–TBA)	July 1, 1988	June 30, 1990	1 year, 364 days	Republican	App.
73	Walter T. Kenney Sr. (TBA–TBA)	July 1, 1990	June 30, 1994	3 years, 364 days	Democratic	App.
74	Leonidas B. Young II (1954–2016)	July 1, 1994	June 30, 1996	1 year, 365 days	Democratic	App.
75	Larry E. Chavis (TBA–TBA)	July 1, 1996	June 30, 1998	1 year, 364 days	Democratic	App.
76	Tim Kaine (born 1958)	July 1, 1998	September 10, 2001 (Note: Kaine resigned in order to run successfully for Lieutenant Governor of Virginia.)	3 years, 71 days	Democratic	App.
77	Rudy McCollum (born 1955)	September 11, 2001	January 1, 2005	3 years, 112 days	Democratic	App.
=== Popularly-elected mayors (since 2005) ===
78	Douglas Wilder (born 1931)	January 1, 2005	January 1, 2009	4 years, 0 days	Democratic	2004
79	Dwight Clinton Jones (born 1948)	January 1, 2009	January 1, 2017	8 years, 0 days	Democratic	2008
79	Dwight Clinton Jones (born 1948)	January 1, 2009	January 1, 2017	8 years, 0 days	Democratic	2012
80	Levar Stoney (born 1981)	January 1, 2017	January 1, 2025	8 years, 0 days	Democratic	2016
80	Levar Stoney (born 1981)	January 1, 2017	January 1, 2025	8 years, 0 days	Democratic	2020
81	Danny Avula (born 1978)	January 1, 2025	Incumbent	1 year, 249 days	Democratic	2024
