= James McClurg =

American Founding Father and physician (1746–1823)

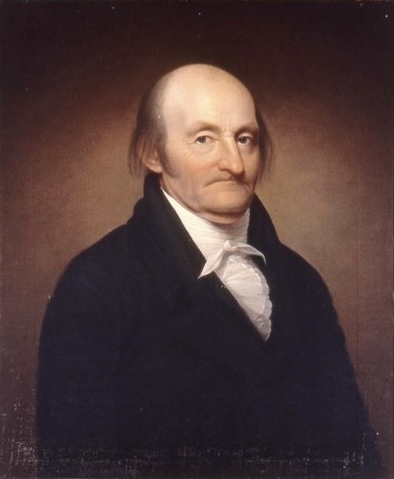
- Portrait by Cephas Thompson, c. 1810

18th, 21st, and 24th Mayor of Richmond, Virginia
- In office 1797–1798

Delegate to Philadelphia Convention (1787)

Personal details
- Born: 1746 near Hampton, Colony of Virginia, British America
- Died: July 9, 1823 (aged 77) Richmond, Virginia, U.S.
- Spouse: Elizabeth Seldon
- Children: Elizabeth Seldon McClurg
- Education: College of William and Mary; University of Edinburgh
- Profession: Physician, Statesman

James McClurg (1746 – July 9, 1823) was an American medical doctor and Founding Father who served as a delegate to the Philadelphia Convention which drafted the United States Constitution in 1787. McClurg served as the 18th, 21st, and 24th mayor of Richmond, Virginia. His lifelong friendship with Thomas Jefferson dated from their school days, and he later became friends with James Madison. McClurg, who was a surgeon in the Continental Army during the Revolutionary War, is believed to have owned a series of slaves over the course of his lifetime, with least eight documented in 1810.

== Medical career ==
James McClurg was one of the most distinguished physicians in the colonies. He was a graduate of the College of William and Mary, where he later served as a professor, and received his medical degree from the University of Edinburgh in Scotland in 1770. He also studied in London and Paris. McClurg practiced first in Williamsburg, then in Richmond. McClurg's work and writings were respected by the medical community on both sides of the Atlantic. His Experiments upon the Human Bile and Reflections on the Biliary Secretions (London: 1772), was translated into several languages. In 1774, he was elected to the American Philosophical Society.

McClurg served as a surgeon of the American navy in Hampton, Virginia, during the American Revolutionary War and was appointed Physician General and Director of Hospitals for Virginia's military forces in 1777. On December 4, 1779, the Board of Visitors at the College of William and Mary voted to appoint McClurg as the first Chair of Anatomy and Medicine at the college, a position he held until moving to Richmond and returning to private practice in 1784. McClurg achieved renown in Richmond for his efforts to stop various epidemics, including the yellow fever in 1798. However, his contagious disease focus later brought criticism in connection with the botched toxicological work in the celebrated trial concerning the murder of Judge George Wythe, whom he initially thought suffered from cholera, not arsenic poisoning. McClurg was also the first honoree of the Philadelphia Journal of Medical and Physical Sciences. In 1820 and 1821 McClurg was president of Virginia's State Medical Society.

== Public service ==
To prevent the Francophobic Arthur Lee from becoming The Continental Congress's first Secretary of Foreign Affairs in 1781, James Madison, still wanting to vote for a Virginian, nominated McClurg as a third candidate, along with the previously nominated Lee and Robert R. Livingston. The French minister, Anne-César, Chevalier de la Luzerne, thereafter convinced New Jersey's John Witherspoon, who was paradoxically a pro-Lee Francophile, that diplomatic troubles would likely ensue should Lee be elected, and Witherspoon abstained, tilting New Jersey's vote and the election to Livingston. Livingston won seven states, compared to three for Lee and two for McClurg.

When Patrick Henry refused to attend the Philadelphia Convention, Virginia's legislature selected McClurg as a delegate along with George Washington, George Mason, James Madison, Edmund Randolph and George Wythe. McClurg thus became one of three physicians (with Hugh Williamson and James McHenry) involved in crafting the U.S. Constitution. McClurg advocated increased executive powers while at the convention, but returned to Virginia in early August. He never returned, worried that his "vote would only operate to produce a division, & so destroy the vote of the state", and thus did not sign the final draft when finished in September 1787. President Washington later considered nominating him as Secretary of State, after Thomas Jefferson resigned.

McClurg served on Virginia's Executive Council during Washington's administration. A Richmond city councilman for more than a dozen years, McClurg was elected Mayor of Richmond for three terms, first in 1797.

== Personal life ==
James McClurg was born in Elizabeth City County, Virginia, in 1746 to Walter McClurg, a British naval surgeon. In 1779 he married Elizabeth Seldon with whom he had two children. His daughter Elizabeth Selden McClurg eventually married John Wickham, a celebrated Richmond attorney. Widowed in 1818, McClurg left his practice to his nephew, James Drew McCaw, who was also a physician. Although a Presbyterian, McClurg is buried at St. John's Church in Richmond. He died on July 9, 1823, in Richmond.

== Publications ==
- McClurg, James (1772). Experiments Upon the Human Bile and Reflections on the Biliary Secretions. London: Printed for T. Cadell, in the Strand.
- — (1820). "On Reasoning in Medicine". Philadelphia Journal of the Medical and Physical Sciences. 1: 217–241.

== See also ==
- List of mayors of Richmond, Virginia
