= Rudy McCollum =

American lawyer and politician

77th Mayor of Richmond
- In office September 11, 2001 – January 1, 2005
- Preceded by: Tim Kaine
- Succeeded by: Douglas Wilder

Personal details
- Born: Rudolph Clyde McCollum Jr. November 28, 1955 (age 70) Richmond, Virginia, U.S.
- Party: Democratic
- Education: Howard University (BA); University of Maryland (JD)
- Occupation: Lawyer; politician

Rudolph Clyde McCollum Jr. (born November 28, 1955) is an American lawyer who served as the mayor of Richmond, Virginia from 2001 to 2005.

== Early life and education ==
A native of Richmond, McCollum graduated in 1973 from Huguenot High School.

McCollum graduated from historically black Howard University with a Bachelor of Arts in economics in 1978. Later on, he received his Juris Doctor from the University of Maryland School of Law; he was admitted to the state bar in 1991.

== Political career ==
McCollum was first elected to the Richmond City Council in 1996. The councilman for the Fifth District, he represented the central-most portion of the city. After a three-year stint as Vice Mayor, it was announced in late 2001 that he would replace the outgoing Mayor, Tim Kaine, who was elected Lieutenant Governor in the November general election.

McCollum was sworn in as the 77th Mayor of Richmond on September 11, 2001. He was the last mayor of Richmond to be appointed by the nine-member city council before a 2004 voter-approved referendum which adopted the mayor-at-large form of government. Under this new system, the mayor is not appointed but rather elected by popular vote.

Opting to run for a second term, McCollum received an extremely low percentage of the vote, losing to former Governor L. Douglas Wilder by a margin of over 60 percent. Despite this, approval of McCollum was still fairly high when he left office. Many attribute his loss to a combination of his lack of campaigning and Wilder's reputation.

== Post-mayoralty ==
McCollum has held a number of positions since his failed reelection bid. In 2006, he established his own law firm, where he currently practices bankruptcy and divorce law. Until 2011, he was a member of the Virginia Parole Board.

Asked in 2012 about possibly reentering politics, he said, "My main priority right now is to get my kids out of my house and prepare them for the world that they are going to have to live in. Those are certainly my two most important constituents — or three, with my wife."

Political offices
Preceded by Tim Kaine	Mayor of Richmond; 2001–2005	Succeeded by Doug Wilder
