= Danny Avula =

American politician (born 1978)

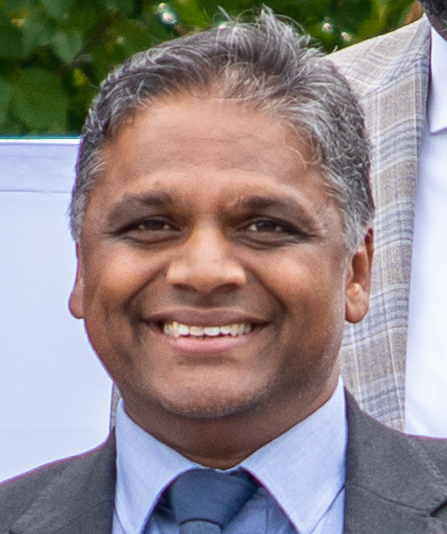
- Avula in 2025

81st Mayor of Richmond
- Incumbent
- Assumed office January 1, 2025
- Preceded by: Levar Stoney

Personal details
- Born: 1978 (age 47–48) Hyderabad, India
- Party: Democratic
- Education: University of Virginia (BA); Virginia Commonwealth University (MD); Johns Hopkins University (MPH)

Danny Avula (born 1978) is an Indian-American public health professional and politician who is the mayor of Richmond, Virginia, following his victory in the 2024 election. He is a member of the Democratic Party, and as an Indian-American, is the city's first Asian-American mayor.

== Early life and education ==
Avula was born in Hyderabad, India, and immigrated with his family to the United States a year after he was born. His father joined the U.S. Navy and his family lived in California until Avula's late elementary school years. After his father retired from active duty, both his parents spent their careers working for the Department of Defense. He grew up in Northern Virginia.

Avula attended the University of Virginia studying biology for his undergrad, graduating when he was 19. He then attended medical school at Virginia Commonwealth University to become a pediatrician. Later, he earned a Masters of Public Health at Johns Hopkins University.

== Career ==
Avula gained prominence during the COVID-19 pandemic earning the nickname "Richmond's Dr. Fauci" and led vaccination efforts in Virginia. He previously served as director of the Health District covering Richmond and Henrico County. In 2020, he was named Style Weekly's Richmonder of the Year. He went on to be appointed Commissioner of Social Services for the Commonwealth of Virginia by Governors Ralph Northam and Glenn Youngkin.

Avula announced his campaign for mayor of Richmond, Virginia, on April 10, 2024. On November 5, 2024, Avula won the 2024 Richmond mayoral election becoming mayor-elect of the city. Avula was sworn in on January 1, 2025.

== Personal life ==
Avula is married to Mary Kay, a Richmond Public Schools elementary school teacher. He and his wife have five children. One of their children is adopted.

He serves on the board of the Medical College of Virginia Foundation and previously chaired the Richmond Memorial Health Foundation.

Political offices
Preceded by Levar Stoney	Mayor of Richmond; 2025–present	Incumbent
