= William Foushee =

American physician

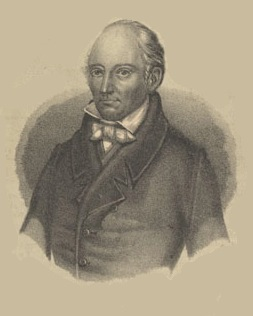

1st Mayor of Richmond, Virginia
- In office July 3, 1782 – June 30, 1783
- Succeeded by: John J. Beckley

Personal details
- Born: William Foushee; October 26, 1749 Northumberland, Virginia, British America
- Died: August 21, 1824 (aged 74) Richmond, Virginia, U.S.
- Resting place: Shockoe Hill Cemetery, Richmond
- Spouse: Isabella Harmondson
- Education: University of Edinburgh Medical School
- Profession: Physician

William Foushee Sr. (October 26, 1749 – August 21, 1824) was an American physician and politician. After serving as a surgeon in the American Revolution, he entered local politics in Virginia, serving as the first Mayor of Richmond from 1782 to 1783. He also served as the postmaster of Richmond from 1808 to 1824.

== Early life ==
Foushee was born to John Foushee and Winifred (Williams) Foushee on October 26, 1749, in Northumberland County, Virginia.

A third-generation Virginian, Foushee's paternal grandfather James immigrated from France.

== Marriage and children ==
On March 6, 1775, Foushee married Elizabeth Isabella Harmanson (d. Sept. 26, 1802) in Northampton County, Virginia.

The couple had nine children:

- Dr. John Harmanson Foushee (Feb. 2, 1776–1812), unknown if married
- Kendall Fraser Foushee (Feb.17, 1778-Feb. 27, 1778)
- Ann Foushee (July 13, 1779– March 19, 1796), never married
- Charlotte Foushee (Nov. 6, 1781–Nov. 8, 1783)
- Dr. William Foushee Jr. (Feb. 10, 1784–1835), married Lucy Lawrence 1822)
- Elizabeth H. Foushee (June 6, 1786 – 1859), married Richard E. Parker, who was at various times a Member of the Virginia House of Delegates, a Justice of the Virginia Supreme Court, and a U.S. Senator
- Charlotte Foushee (Jan. 28, 1788- July 28, 1822), married Williams Carter, a son of Charles Hill Carter of Shirley Plantation and brother of Anne Hill Carter, who was the mother of Confederate General Robert E. Lee
- Isabella Foushee (Feb. 7, 1789–1865), married Thomas Ritchie, who was the founded of the Richmond Enquirer
- Margaret Taylor Foushee (March 13, 1793– Aug. 4, 1822), married William C. Parker, a brother of the aforementioned Richard E. Parker

== Career ==
Foushee was a surgeon during the American Revolutionary War. He served as President of the Medical Society of Virginia. He was also a first mover in the newly discovered smallpox inoculation.

== Later years and death ==
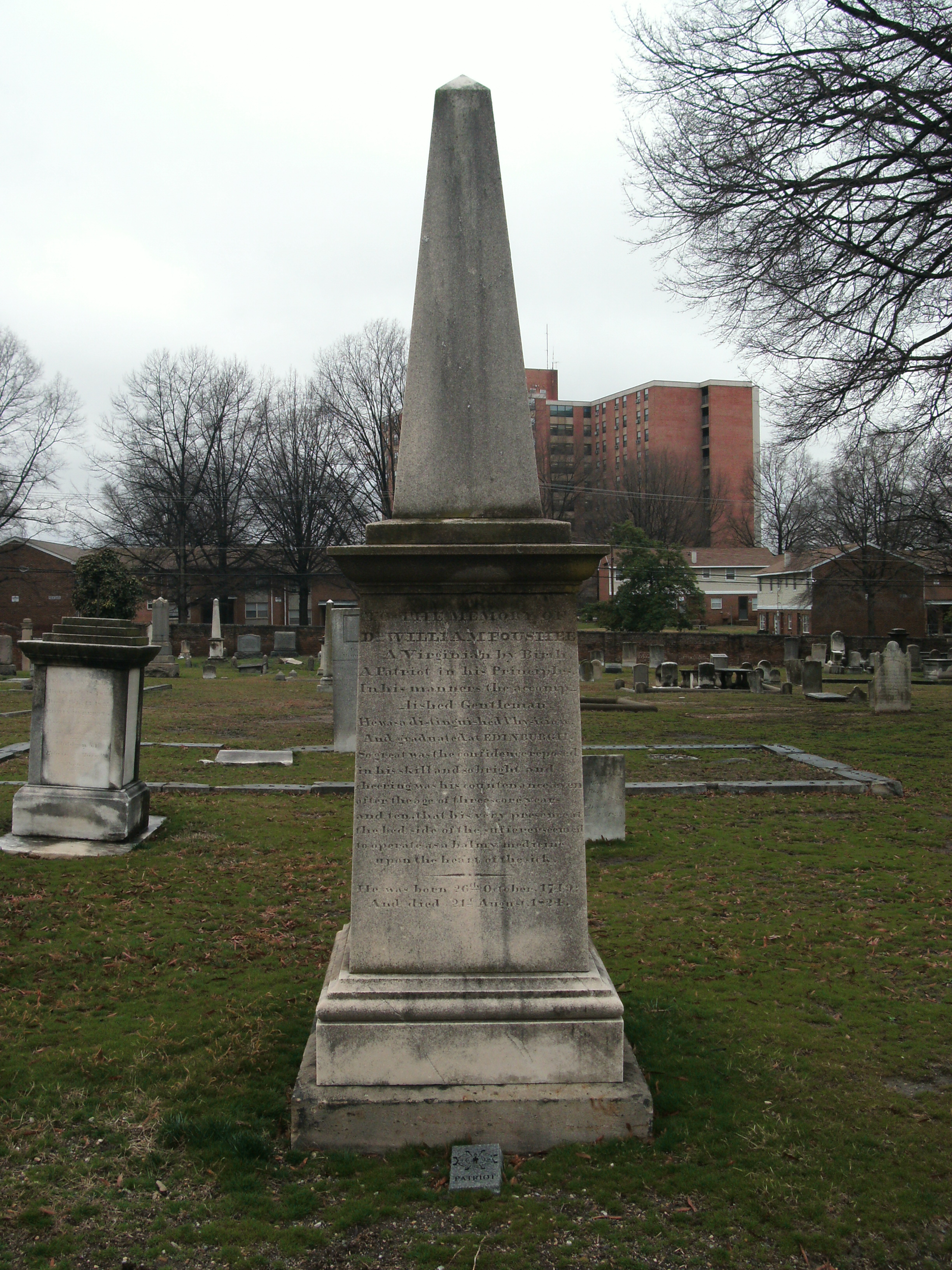
Foushee's grave at Shockoe Hill Cemetery in Richmond

For the last sixteen years of his life, Foushee served in the capacity of Richmond's postmaster. He was appointed to that position on June 20, 1808, by President Jefferson.

On August 21, 1824, Foushee died in his home. His body is interred at Shockoe Hill Cemetery on Shockoe Hill in Richmond.

Political offices
Preceded by None	Mayor of Richmond; 1782–1783	Succeeded by John J. Beckley
Government offices
Preceded by Marks Underhill	Postmaster of Richmond; 1808–1824	Succeeded by James P. Preston
