= 2024 Richmond, Virginia mayoral election =

2024 Richmond mayoral election
- November 5, 2024
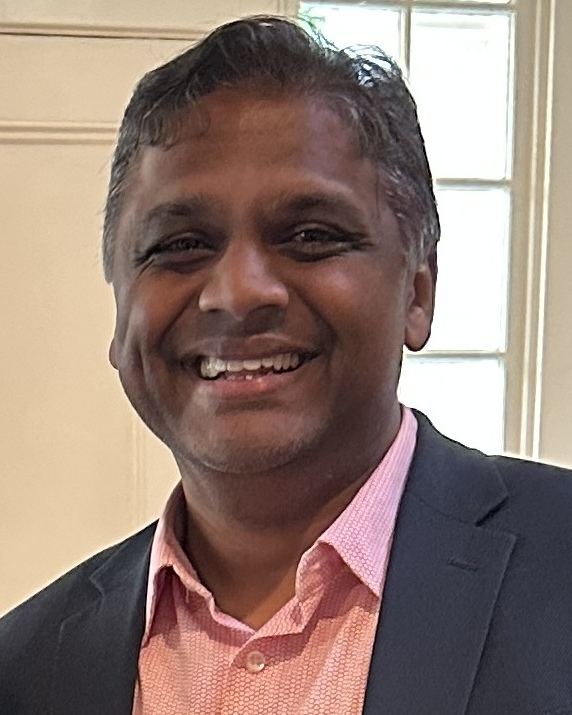

Candidate	Danny Avula	Michelle Mosby
Party	Democratic	Independent
Popular vote	44,832	24,798
Percentage	46.0%	25.4%
Candidate	Harrison Roday	Andreas Addison
Party	Democratic	Independent
Popular vote	12,700	11,619
Percentage	13.0%	11.9%
- Results by precinct Avula: 30–40% 40–50% 50–60% 60–70% Mosby: 30–40% 40–50% 50–60%
Mayor before election
Levar Stoney
Democratic
Elected mayor
Danny Avula
Democratic

The 2024 Richmond mayoral election took place on November 5, 2024, to elect the mayor of Richmond, Virginia. The election was won by Danny Avula who took office as the city's 81st mayor in January 2025. He became the city's first immigrant mayor.

Incumbent Democratic mayor Levar Stoney was term-limited and could not seek re-election to a third term in office; he instead ran for Lieutenant Governor of Virginia in 2025, but lost in the primary.

== Candidates ==
=== Declared ===
- Andreas Addison, city councilor (Party affiliation: Independent)
- Danny Avula, former commissioner of the Virginia Department of Social Services (Party affiliation: Democratic)
- Michelle Mosby, former city council president and candidate for mayor in 2016 (Party affiliation: Independent)
- Maurice Neblett, security professional (Party affiliation: Independent)
- Harrison Roday, investor (Party affiliation: Democratic)

=== Withdrawn ===
- Garrett Sawyer, school board member (Party affiliation: Independent) (running for re-election)

=== Declined ===
- Jeff Bourne, former Virginia state delegate and former Richmond school board member (Party affiliation: Democratic)
- Chris Hilbert, former city councilor (Party affiliation: Independent)

== Endorsements ==
Michelle Mosby (I)

State legislators

- Michael Jones, Virginia state delegate (Democratic)
- Delores McQuinn, Virginia state delegate (Democratic)

Richmond officials

- Dwight Clinton Jones, former mayor (Democratic)
- Cynthia Newbille, city councilor
- Ellen Robertson, city councilor

Individuals

- J.J. Minor II, president of the Richmond NAACP
Declined to endorse

Richmond officials

- Levar Stoney, incumbent mayor (Democratic)

== Results ==
2024 Richmond, Virginia mayoral election
Candidate	Votes	%
Danny Avula	47,398	45.59
Michelle Mosby	26,778	25.76
Harrison Roday	13,581	13.06
Andreas Addison	12,308	11.84
Maurice Neblett	3,176	3.05
Write-in	721	0.69
Total votes	98,752	100.00

== See also ==
- 2024 Virginia elections
