= Mayor of Richmond, Virginia =

Political office in the United States

Mayor of the City of Richmond, Virginia
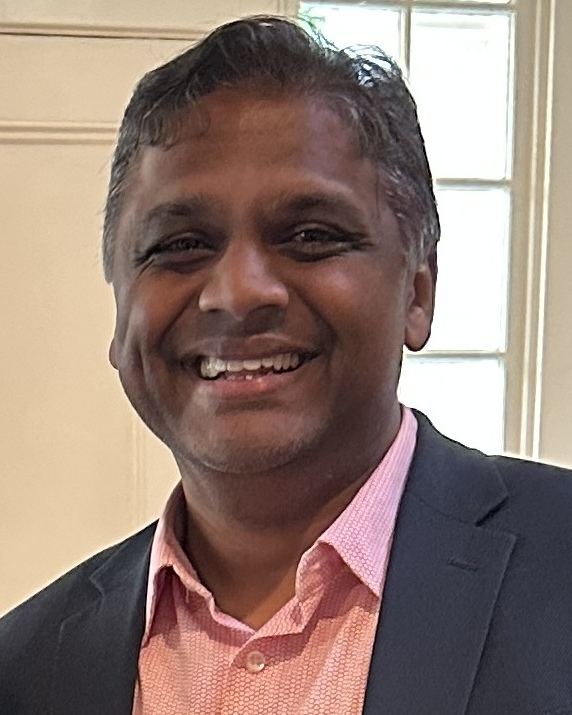
- Incumbent; Danny Avula since January 1, 2025
- Style: The Honorable
- Term length: Four years renewable once
- Inaugural holder: William Foushee
- Formation: 17th century
- Salary: $125,000
- Website: www.ci.richmond.va.us/Mayor/index.aspx

The Mayor of the City of Richmond, Virginia is head of the executive branch of Richmond, Virginia's city government. The mayor's office administers all city services, public property, police and fire protection, and most public agencies, and enforces all city, state and federal laws within Richmond, Virginia.

The mayor looks over a city budget at roughly $765 million a year.

== Current mayor ==
The current mayor is Democrat Danny Avula, who was elected on November 5, 2024. Avula took office on January 1, 2025.

=== Cabinet ===
The mayor of Richmond contains a multi-member cabinet of advisers that assist the mayor on city policy decisions. The following individuals are part of Stoney's cabinet.

Position	Individual	Party	Assumed office
Senior Policy Advisor for Innovation	Jon Baliles	Democratic	January 19, 2017
Senior Policy Advisor for Engagement	Lisa Speller-Davis	Democratic	January 19, 2017
Senior Policy Advisor for Opportunity	Thad Williamson	Democratic	January 19, 2017
Senior Assistant to the Mayor	Rushawna Senior	Democratic	January 19, 2017

== History of the office ==
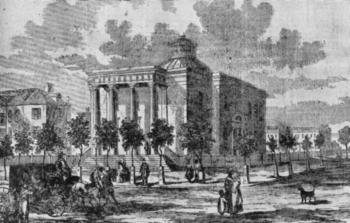
Richmond's original City Hall building, used from 1814 to 1874

In May 1782, the Virginia General Assembly expressed desire to move inland, to a place less exposed to British incursions than Williamsburg. Richmond had been made the temporary capital after urging from Thomas Jefferson years earlier, and it was soon decided to make the move permanent.

Two months later, on July 2, a charter was written up, and the city was incorporated. Twelve men were to be elected from the City at-large and were to select one of their own to act as Mayor, another to serve as Recorder and four to serve as Aldermen. The remaining six were to serve as members of the Common Council. All positions had term limits of three years, with the exception of the mayor who could only serve one year consecutively. A vote was held at a meeting the following day, and Dr. William Foushee, Sr. was chosen as the first mayor.

In March 1851, the decision was made to replace the original Richmond City Charter. It was decided that all city officials were to be popularly elected. After the 12-year tenure of William Lambert and his short-term replacement by recorder Samuel C. Pulliam, elections were held, with Joseph C. Mayo coming out on top.

Mayo was deposed in April 1865, weeks before the end of the American Civil War, when Union forces captured the city.

The system set forth by the Second City Charter worked as long as the City was small and most voters knew personally, the qualifications of the men for whom they were voting and the requirements for the jobs to which they were elected.

Beginning in 1948, Richmond eliminated the popularly elected mayor's office, and instituted a council-manager form of government. This lasted until 2004, when the City Charter was changed once again, bringing back the popularly elected mayor. Former Virginia Gov. L. Douglas Wilder was elected mayor that year. Of Virginia's 38 cities, only Richmond does not have a council-manager form of government.

== Offices appointed ==
The mayor has the power to appoint the directors and administrative leaders of the following city offices and departments:

- Chief Administrative Officer

== See also ==
- Government of Richmond, Virginia
