= List of Greyhound Bus stations =

The following is a list of stations or terminals used by Greyhound Lines, either currently in use or historic former Greyhound stations.

== Canada ==
- Gare d'autocars de Montréal, Montreal
- Union Station Bus Terminal, Toronto
- Pacific Central Station, Vancouver

== Mexico ==
- Monterrey Greyhound Bus Station, Monterrey
- Nuevo Laredo Greyhound Bus Station, Nuevo Laredo

== United States ==
=== Arkansas ===
- Blytheville Greyhound Bus Station, Blytheville, NRHP-listed
- Greyhound Bus Station, Little Rock.

=== California ===
- Bakersfield station
- Chico station
- Delano Greyhound Station, 1112 High St
- Fresno station
- Gilroy station
- Hayward station
- Indio station, 83100 Indio Boulevard
- Lodi Transit Station
- Los Angeles Union Station
- Madera Intermodal Center
- Merced Transportation Center
- Modesto Transportation Center
- Oakland Greyhound Station, 2103 San Pablo Ave
- Palm Springs station
- Paso Robles station
- Redding station
- Reedley station
- Richmond Greyhound Depot, 250-23rd Street.
- Roseville station
- Sacramento Greyhound Station, 420 Richards Blvd
- Salesforce Transit Center, San Francisco
- Salinas Intermodal Transportation Center
- San Jose Diridon station
- San Rafael Transit Center, San Rafael
- Santa Barbara station
- Santa Fe Passenger Depot, Fresno
- Suisun–Fairfield station
- Tracy Transit Center
- Truckee station
- Tulare Greyhound Station, 407 N K St
- Visalia Transit Center
- Victor Valley Transportation Center
- San Diego County
  - El Cajon Transit Center (MTS Transit Center), El Cajon
  - Escondido Transit Center
  - Oceanside Transit Center
  - San Ysidro Transit Center (MTS Transit Center), San Ysidro

=== Colorado ===
- Avon Station, Avon
- Copper Creek Transit Center, Winter Park
- Denver Union Station, Denver
- Eco Transit, Vail
- RTD Federal Center Station, Lakewood
- Fraser Station, Fraser
- Glenwood Springs (Amtrak station), Glenwood
- Granby Station, Granby
- Grand Junction Regional Airport, Grand Junction
- Greeley-Evans Transportation Center, Greeley
- Harmony Transfer Center, Fort Collins
- Hayden Station, Hayden
- Hot Sulphur Springs Station, Hot Sulphur Springs
- Idaho Springs Station, Idaho Springs
- Kremmling Station, Kremmling
- Lamar Transit Center, Lamar
- Muddy Pass Station, Kremmling
- Parshall Station, Parshall
- Paperback Trading Post, Walsenburg
- Pueblo Transit Center, Pueblo
- Reata Travel Stop, Sterling
- Steamboat Springs Station, Steamboat Springs
- Tabernash Station, Tabernash
- Tejon Park and Ride, Colorado Springs
- Trinidad Station, Trinidad
- Uptown Video, Rocky Ford

=== Connecticut ===
- Bridgeport (Metro-North station), Bridgeport
- New Haven Union Station, New Haven
- New London Union Station, New London
- Stamford Transportation Center, Stamford
- Hartford Union Station, Hartford

=== Delaware ===
- 7-Eleven at 654 North Dupont Highway, Dover
- Wilmington (Amtrak station), Wilmington

=== District of Columbia ===
- Washington Union Station

=== Florida ===
- Daytona Beach Greyhound Station
- Orange Park Florida
- Orlando Station
- Miami Station
- Ft. Myers Bus Station Fort Myers
- Panama City Greyhound Station, Panama City
- Ft. Lauderdale Station
- Gainesville, Florida

=== Georgia ===
- Atlanta Bus Station, 232 Forsyth St SW, Atlanta, GA 30303
- Athens Bus Station, 4020 Atlanta Hwy Athens, GA 30606
- Augusta Bus Station, 1546 Broad St, Augusta, GA 30904
- Columbus Bus Station, 818 Veterans Pkwy, Columbus, GA 31901
- Macon Terminal, 65 Spring St, Macon, GA 31201
- Marietta Bus Station, 1250 S Marietta Pkwy, Marietta, GA 30060
- Norcross Terminal, 2105 Norcross Pkwy, Norcross, GA 30071
- Savannah Bus Station, 610 W Oglethorpe Ave Savannah, GA 31401 Savannah, GA
- Valdosta Bus Station, 200 N Oak St, Valdosta, GA 31601

=== Illinois ===
- Illinois Terminal, Champaign
- Greyhound Station, Chicago
- Cumberland (CTA station), Chicago
- 95th/Dan Ryan (CTA station), Chicago
- Union Station, Chicago
- Naperville (Metra), Naperville

=== Indiana ===
- Greyhound Bus Terminal, Evansville, NRHP-listed
- Gary Metro Center, Gary
- Indianapolis Union Station, Indianapolis
- South Bend International Airport, South Bend
- South Street Station, South Bend

=== Kansas ===
- Lawrence Vermont St at West 7th Street
- Topeka 600 South East Quincy Street

=== Kentucky ===
- Ashland (Amtrak station)
- Bowling Green 55 Parker Avenue
- Paducah 2719 Irvin Cobb Drive
- Louisville Bus Station
- Lexington 477 NorthWest New Circle Road

=== Louisiana ===
- Baton Rouge
- New Orleans Union Passenger Terminal, New Orleans

=== Maine ===
- Bangor
- Waterville
- Augusta
- Lewiston
- Portland
- Wells

=== Maryland ===
- Aberdeen (MARC station), Aberdeen
- Baltimore Greyhound Terminal, Baltimore
- Gulf at 212 Sunburst Highway, Cambridge
- College Park–University of Maryland station, College Park
- Allegany College of Maryland, Cumberland
- Cumberland (Amtrak station), Cumberland
- Sunoco at 8359 Ocean Gateway, Easton
- Frederick Transit Center, Frederick
- Frederick Municipal Airport, Frederick
- Frostburg State University, Frostburg
- Pilot Travel Center at 3000 Chestnut Ridge Road, Grantsville
- 7-Eleven at 911 Ontario Street, Havre de Grace
- New Carrollton (WMATA station), New Carrollton
- University of Maryland Eastern Shore Student Center, Princess Anne
- Shore Transit-tri County, Salisbury
- Silver Spring Transit Center, Silver Spring
- White Marsh Station, White Marsh

=== Massachusetts ===
==== Albany route ====
- South Station Bus Terminal, Boston
- Framingham
- Sturbridge
- Springfield Union Station, Springfield
- Lee
- Pittsfield
- Albany

=== Others ===
- Riverside (MBTA station), Newton
- Worcester Union Station, Worcester

=== Michigan ===
- Ann Arbor station
- Capital Area Multimodal Gateway
- Detroit Bus Station
- Flint (Amtrak station)
- Kalamazoo Transportation Center
- Pontiac Transportation Center

=== Minnesota ===
- Hawthorne Transportation Center, Minneapolis
- Northland Depot, Minneapolis
- Saint Paul Union Depot, St. Paul

=== Mississippi ===
- Union Station, Jackson
- Meridian Union Station, Meridian

=== Missouri ===
- Kansas City Bus Station
- Gateway Transportation Center, St. Louis

=== Nebraska ===
- Omaha Bus Station

=== Nevada ===
- Las Vegas 6675 Gilespie Street

=== New Jersey ===
- Atlantic City Bus Terminal, Atlantic City
- Resorts Casino Hotel, Atlantic City
- Walter Rand Transportation Center, Camden
- Cherry Hill Mall, Cherry Hill
- Pennsylvania Station (Newark), Newark

=== New Mexico ===
- Alvarado Transportation Center, Albuquerque

=== New York ===
- Trailways Greyhound Station, Albany
- Buffalo Metropolitan Transportation Center, Buffalo
- Greater Binghamton Transportation Center, Binghamton
- Ithaca Bus Station, Ithaca
- Port Authority Bus Terminal, Manhattan, New York City
- Trailways Bus Station, Rochester
- William F. Walsh Regional Transportation Center, Syracuse
- Utica Union Station, Utica

=== North Carolina ===
- J. Douglas Gaylon Depot, Greensboro
- Rocky Mount (Amtrak station), Rocky Mount

=== Ohio ===
- Robert K. Pfaff Intermodal Transit Center, Akron
- Cambridge
- Greyhound Bus Station, Cincinnati
- Greyhound Bus Station, Cleveland, NRHP-listed
- Columbus Bus Station, Columbus
- Dayton Bus Station, Dayton
- Elyria
- Kenton
- Lima
- Mansfield
- Sandusky station, Sandusky
- Martin Luther King Jr. Plaza, Toledo
- West Salem
- Youngstown
- Zanesville

=== Oklahoma ===
- Oklahoma City Bus Station
- Tulsa Bus Station

=== Pennsylvania ===
- Allentown
- Altoona
- Bedford
- Doylestown
- Easton Intermodal Transportation Center, Easton
- Ebensburg
- Edinboro University
- Erie 208 East Bayfront Parkway
- Gouldsboro
- Greensburg
- Harrisburg
- Johnstown
- King of Prussia
- Arnold Palmer Regional Airport, Latrobe
- Lewistown
- Meadville
- Monroeville
- Mount Pocono
- New Castle
- Philadelphia (Center City) PPA Transportation Center
- Philadelphia (University City) Schuylkill Avenue and Walnut Street (near 30th Street Station)
- Pittsburgh Grant Street Transportation Center 55 Eleventh Street
- Pittsburgh International Airport
- Scranton
- State College (Pennsylvania State University)
- Stroudsburg
- Tyrone
- Washington
- York
- Zelienople

=== Rhode Island ===
- Kennedy Plaza, Providence

=== South Carolina ===
- Greyhound Bus Depot, Columbia, NRHP-listed

=== Tennessee ===
- Nashville 709 Rep. John Lewis Way South

=== Texas ===
- Dallas 205 S Lamar Street
- Fort Worth Central Station, Fort Worth
- Houston 2121 Main Street
- Amarillo (Amarillo Multimodal Transfer Station) 509 S. Bowie
- Lubbock (Citibus DT Transfer Plaza) 801 Broadway

=== Virginia ===
- Lynchburg – Kemper Street Station, Lynchburg
- Franconia-Springfield (WMATA station), Springfield
- Williamsburg (Amtrak station), Williamsburg

=== Washington ===
- Bellingham (Amtrak station), Bellingham
- Everett Station, Everett
- Kelso Multimodal Transportation Center, Kelso
- Pasco Intermodal Train Station, Pasco
- Tacoma Dome (Sounder station), Tacoma

=== Wisconsin ===
- Appleton Transit Center, Appleton
- Milwaukee Intermodal Station, Milwaukee

=== Wyoming ===
- Cheyenne Rodeway Inn on Central Avenue

== Future ==
- Gateway Station, Charlotte, North Carolina

== Discontinued ==
=== Canada ===
These stations were served by Greyhound Canada, the Canadian subsidiary of Greyhound Lines, which ceased operations on May 13, 2021.

- Ajax Plaza Bus Terminal, Ajax, Ontario
- Barrie Bus Terminal, Barrie, Ontario
- Belleville Transit Terminal, Belleville, Ontario
- Downtown Brampton Terminal, Brampton, Ontario
- Edmonton station, Edmonton, Alberta
- Guelph Bus Terminal, Guelph, Ontario
- Guelph Central Station, Guelph, Ontario
- Terry Fox station, Kanata, Ontario
- Kelowna, British Columbia
- Kingston Bus Terminal, Kingston, Ontario
- Charles St. Transit Terminal, Kitchener, Ontario
- Sportsworld Crossing Transit Loop, Kitchener, Ontario
- London Greyhound Terminal, London, Ontario
- Toronto Pearson International Airport, Mississauga, Ontario
- Gare d'autocars de Montréal, Montreal, Quebec
- Niagara Falls Transit Terminal, Niagara Falls, Ontario
- North Bay station, North Bay, Ontario
- Yorkdale Bus Terminal, North York, Ontario
- Oshawa Bus Terminal, Oshawa, Ontario
- Ottawa Central Station, Ottawa, Ontario
- Peterborough Greyhound Terminal, Peterborough, Ontario
- Scarborough Centre Bus Terminal, Scarborough, Ontario
- St. Catharines Transit Downtown Terminal, St. Catharines, Ontario
- Sudbury Ontario Northland Bus Terminal, Sudbury, Ontario
- Toronto Coach Terminal, Toronto, Ontario
- Union Station (Fairmont Royal York), Toronto, Ontario
- Pacific Central Station, Vancouver, British Columbia
- Windsor International Transit Terminal, Windsor, Ontario
- Winnipeg Bus Terminal, Winnipeg, Manitoba

=== United Kingdom ===
These stations were served by Greyhound UK, which ceased operations on December 5, 2015.

- Bridgend Designer Outlet, Bridgend, Wales
- Bournemouth Coach Station, Bournemouth, England
- Buchanan Bus Station, Glasgow, Scotland
- Cardiff Central Bus Station, Cardiff, Wales
- Green Line Coach Station, London, England
- Fareham Bus Station, Fareham, England
- Hamilton Bus Station, Hamilton, Scotland
- Port of Southampton, Southampton, England
- The Hard Interchange, Portsmouth, England
- Seldown Coach Park, Poole, England
- Swansea City Bus Station, Swansea, Wales

=== United States ===
- Baltimore Travel Plaza, Baltimore, Maryland
- Corning (Amtrak station), Corning, California
- Trenton Transit Center, Trenton, New Jersey
- Staunton (Amtrak station), Staunton, Virginia
- Aurora (Metra), Aurora, Illinois
- Dempster-Skokie (CTA station), Skokie, Illinois
- Decatur Greyhound Station, Decatur, Georgia (defunct 2005 - now a restaurant)
- Graham, NC Graham City Depot (Now Abandoned)
