= Transportation in Chicago =

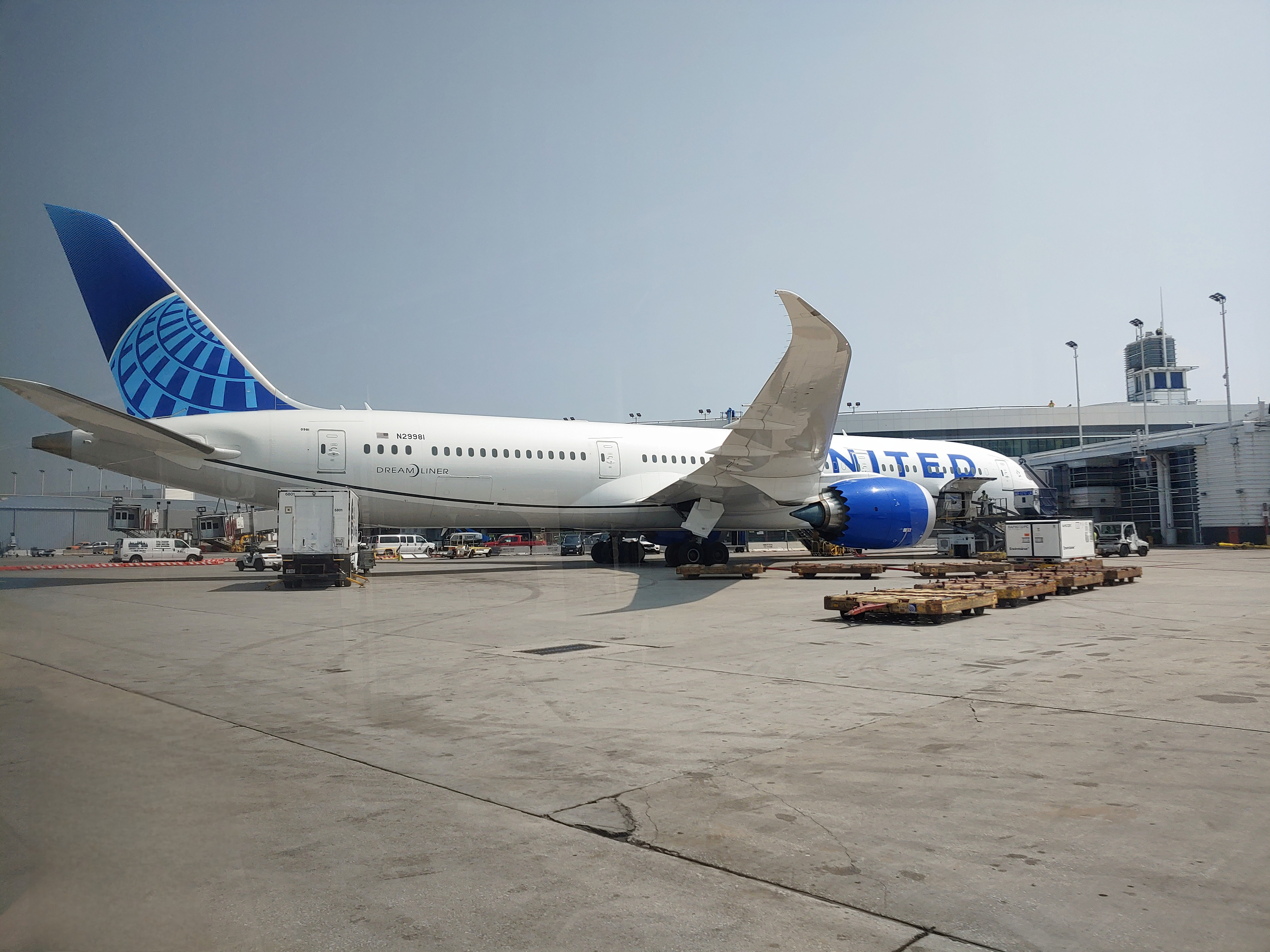
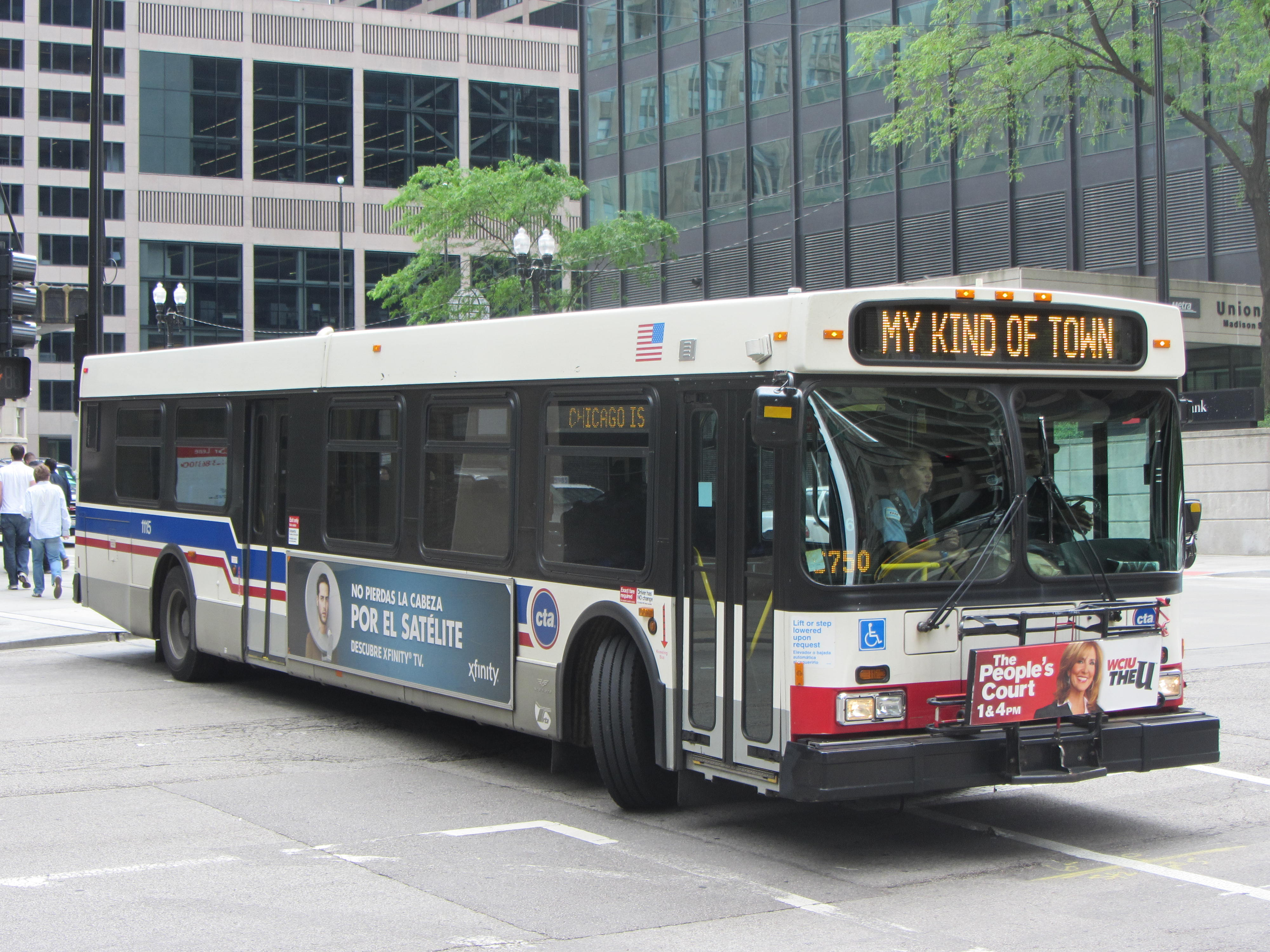
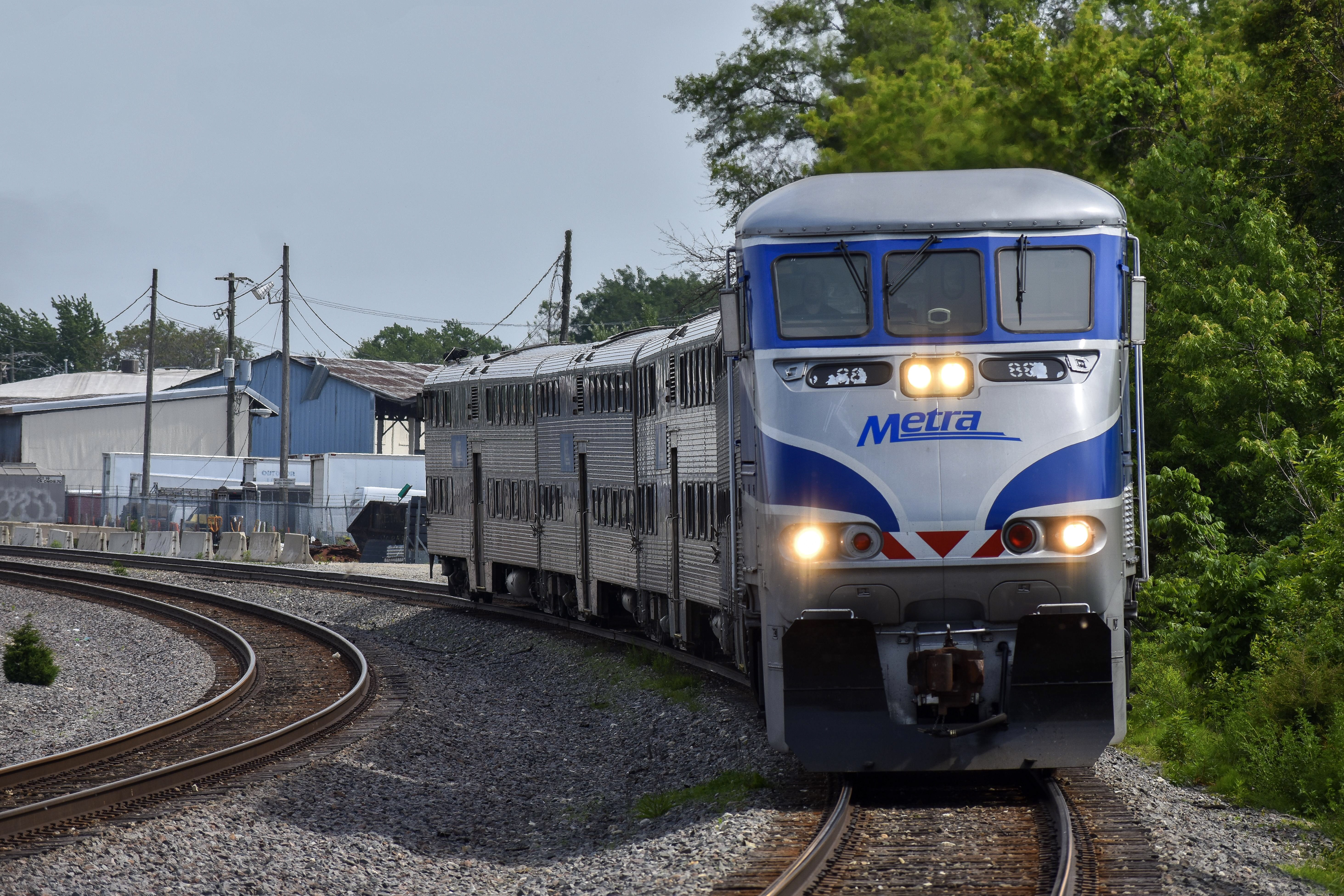
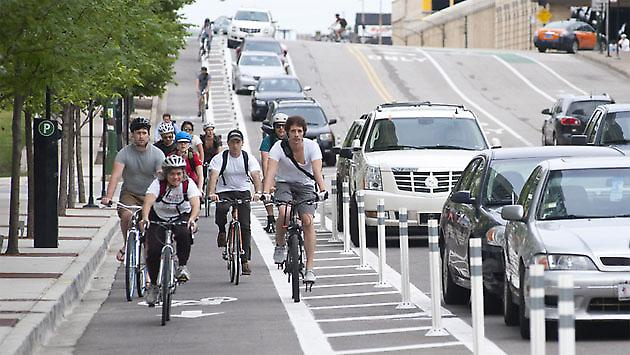
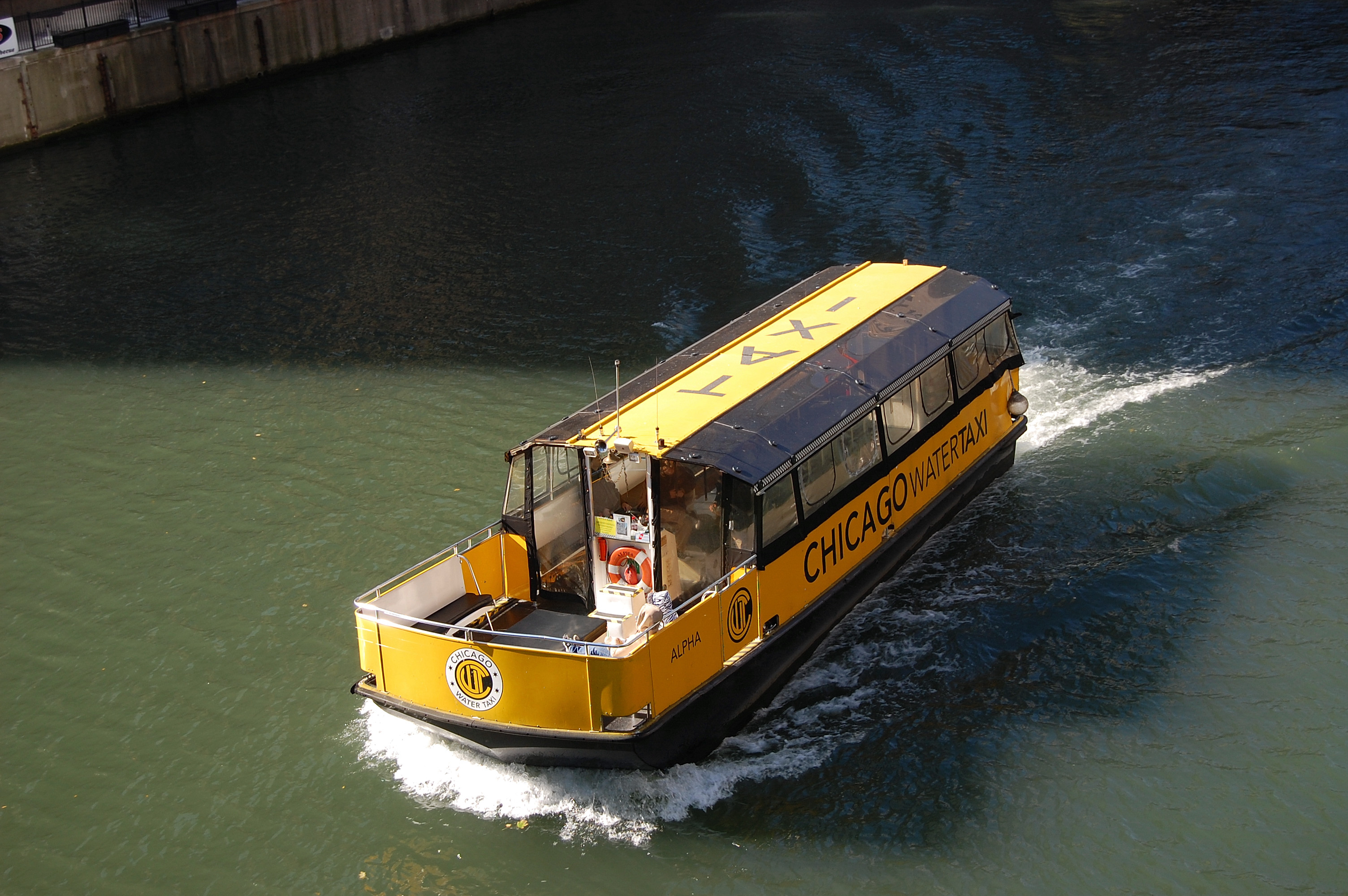
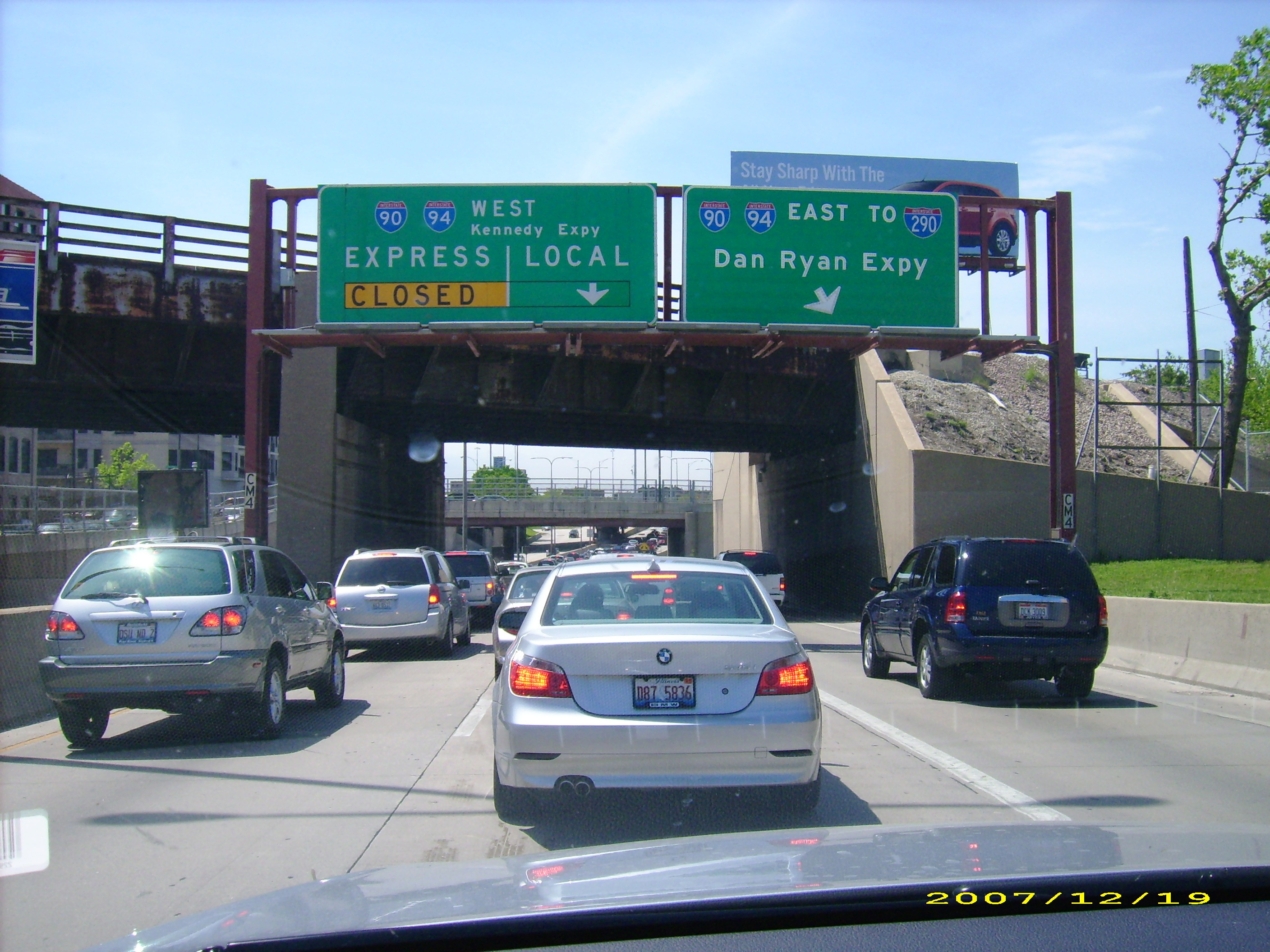
Transportation in Chicago: O'Hare International Airport, New Flyer CTA bus at Canal Street, Metra at Schiller Park, cycling on Kinzie Street, water taxi, Kennedy Expressway (I-90/I-94)

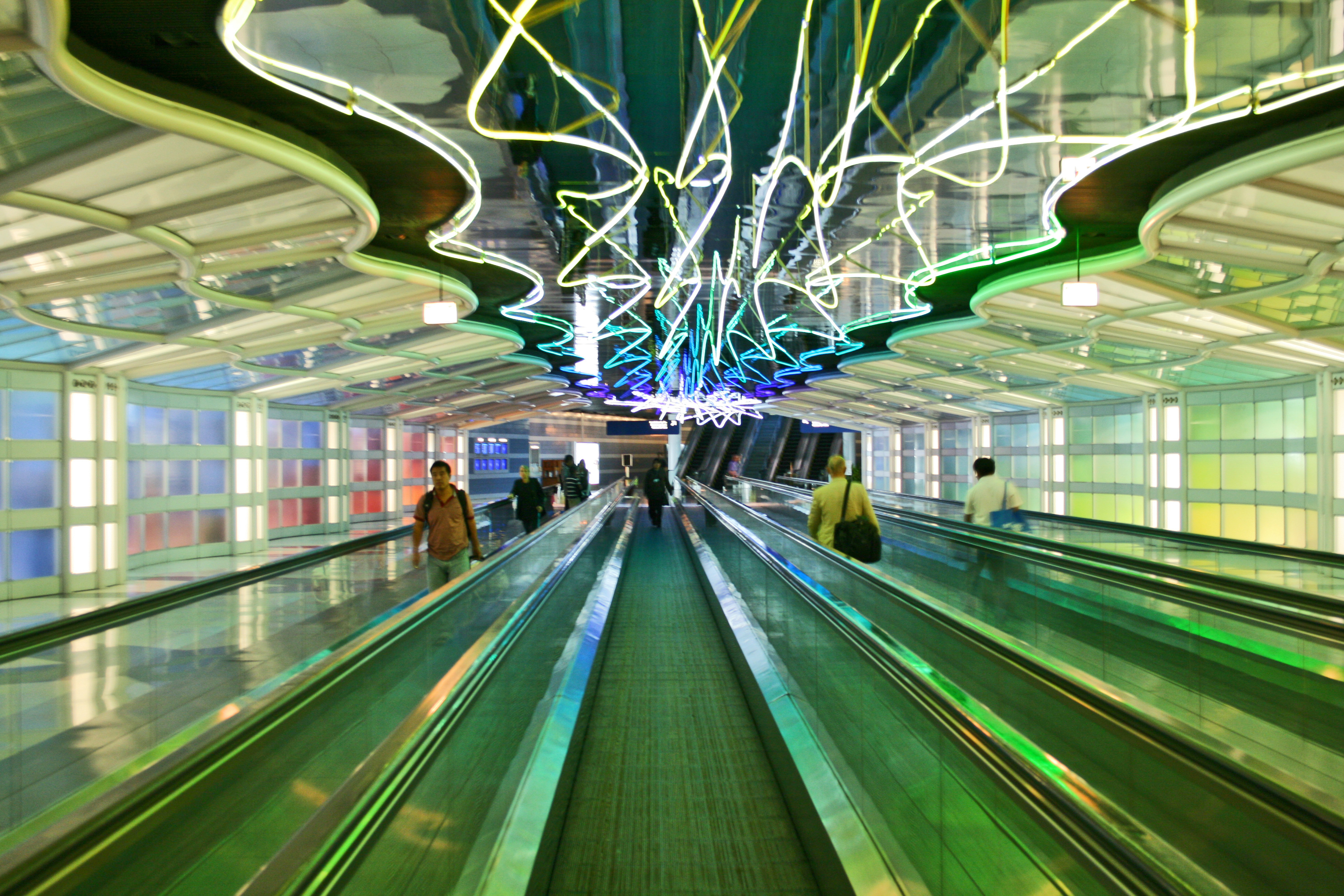
Michael Hayden's neon installation "Sky's the Limit" (1987) in a subterranean walkway at O'Hare Airport. Sometimes called "The Gershwin Tunnel", the walkway connects concourses B and C of Terminal 1, which is operated by United Airlines.

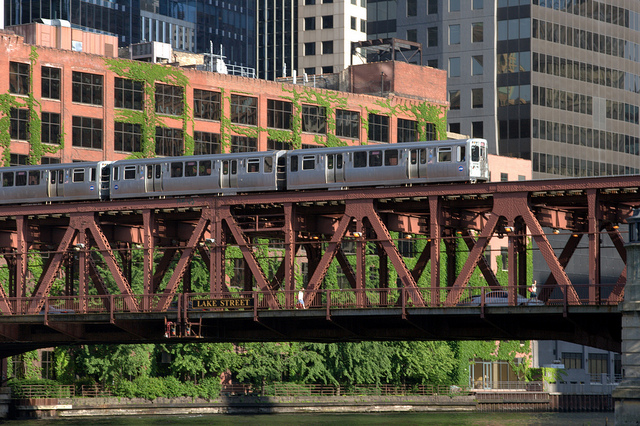
A westbound 'L' train crosses the south fork of the Chicago River.

Chicago, Illinois, is the third-largest city in the United States and a world transit hub. The area is served by two major airports, numerous highways, elevated/subway local train lines, and city/suburban commuter rail lines; it is the national passenger rail hub for Amtrak routes, and also the main freight rail hub of North America.

Surface transportation networks and public ways within the city are the responsibility of the Chicago Department of Transportation. Interstates, U.S. highways, and Illinois state routes are the responsibility of the Illinois Department of Transportation (IDOT). Toll roads located just outside the city are the responsibility of the Illinois State Toll Highway Authority, while the Chicago Skyway is the responsibility of the Skyway Concession Company. Mass transit in much of the Chicago metropolitan area is overseen by the Northern Illinois Transit Authority (NITA). The NITA system is made up of three service boards: the Chicago Transit Authority (CTA), Metra commuter rail, and Pace suburban bus. Operation of O'Hare (ORD) and Midway (MDW) airports is the responsibility of the Chicago Department of Aviation (CDA). Amtrak is the operator of inter-city and long-distance passenger trains that travel through the Midwest and the rest of the United States.

== Airports ==
- O'Hare International Airport (ORD) is a major airport serving numerous domestic and international destinations. It is a hub for United Airlines and American Airlines. Construction is underway for a major expansion. This airport is statistically one of the busiest in the United States, both in terms of aircraft operations and passenger numbers.
- Midway International Airport (MDW) serves primarily domestic destinations, Toronto, and select Mexican cities. It is a major focus city for Southwest Airlines.
- Chicago had a third airport, Meigs Field, until it was demolished in 2003.

There are several other smaller commercial airports in the Chicago area, these include:

- Gary/Chicago International Airport (GYY) in Gary, Indiana, located about 25 miles SE from the Chicago loop. It is operating as the de facto "third airport" for the Chicago area. While the airport's current operations do not include scheduled commercial passenger service, the administration is marketing to airlines and in talks with the U.S. Customs and Border Protection. Recently completed field improvements included extending the main runway to 8,859 feet, longer than any at Midway by some 2,000 feet. Corporations including Boeing and White Lodging Services base their corporate fleets here, and there are two Fixed Base Operators (FBO). The National Guard has constructed facilities to base their Chicago metropolitan area air operations here as well.
- Chicago Rockford International Airport (RFD) in Rockford, which supports scheduled passenger airline service to many cities in the United States and many cargo flights. Rockford officials are positioning the airport to attract customers from Chicago's western suburbs.
- A public heliport called Chicago Vertiport opened in 2015 near the Illinois Medical District.

Milwaukee Mitchell International Airport (MKE) in Milwaukee is also used by residents of Chicago's northern suburbs looking to avoid the congestion of the two main Chicago airports. South Bend International Airport in South Bend, Indiana is connected to downtown Chicago via a South Shore Line station.

=== Suburban airports and airfields ===
Name	IATA airport code	ICAO airport code	Location
Aurora Municipal Airport	AUZ	KARR	Sugar Grove, Illinois
Clow International Airport	1C5	K1C5	Bolingbrook, Illinois
Chicago Executive Airport (formerly Palwaukee)	PWK	KPWK	Wheeling, Illinois
DuPage Airport	DPA	KDPA	West Chicago, Illinois
Lewis University Airport	LOT	KLOT	Romeoville, Illinois
Schaumburg Regional Airport	06C	(none)	Schaumburg, Illinois
Waukegan Regional Airport	UGN	KUGN	Waukegan, Illinois

=== Proposed airports ===
- A Chicago south suburban airport has been proposed as a regional airport in far-south-suburban Peotone, Illinois.

== Cycling ==
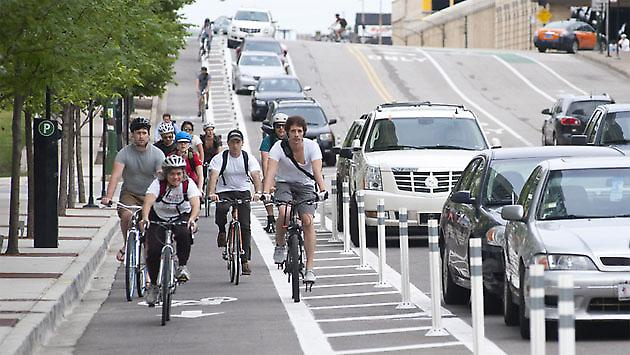
Cyclists commuting on the Kinzie cycle track in Chicago

Chicago maintains a 290-mile network of bikeways - including shared use paths, cycle tracks, and bike lanes - for private, public, and commercial bicycle use. Bicycles are allowed to operate on all Chicago roadways, except limited access highways.

A bicycle sharing system known as Divvy operates 1,000 bicycle stations in Chicago, Evanston, and Oak Park, with 400 more planned over the next few years.

Pedicabs are available for hire at various locations and events around Chicago with high pedestrian traffic.

Bicycles are available for rent at rental shops concentrated along the lakefront in the Loop and Near North Side community areas.

Several delivery companies operate bicycle courier services mainly in the Loop area.

=== Bicycles on transit ===
Bicycles are permitted on CTA buses via front-mounted bicycle racks and onboard CTA trains weekdays excluding the rush hours from 7 to 9 a.m. and 4 to 6 p.m. On weekends and holidays, bicycles are allowed on trains all day except for special events.

Bicycles are allowed onboard Metra commuter rail service during off-peak and non-event times and in reverse peak directions during rush hours.

Bicycles are only allowed on designated South Shore Line commuter rail service trains as part of a pilot program active during non-winter months.

Bicycles are allowed on water taxis during off-peak and weekend hours.

== Transit systems ==
=== Chicago Transit Authority ===
The Chicago Transit Authority, or CTA, one of three service boards of the Northern Illinois Transit Authority (NITA), operates the second largest public transportation system in the United States (to New York's Metropolitan Transportation Authority) and covers the City of Chicago and 40 surrounding suburbs. The CTA operates 24 hours a day and, on an average weekday, 1.6 million rides are taken on the CTA.

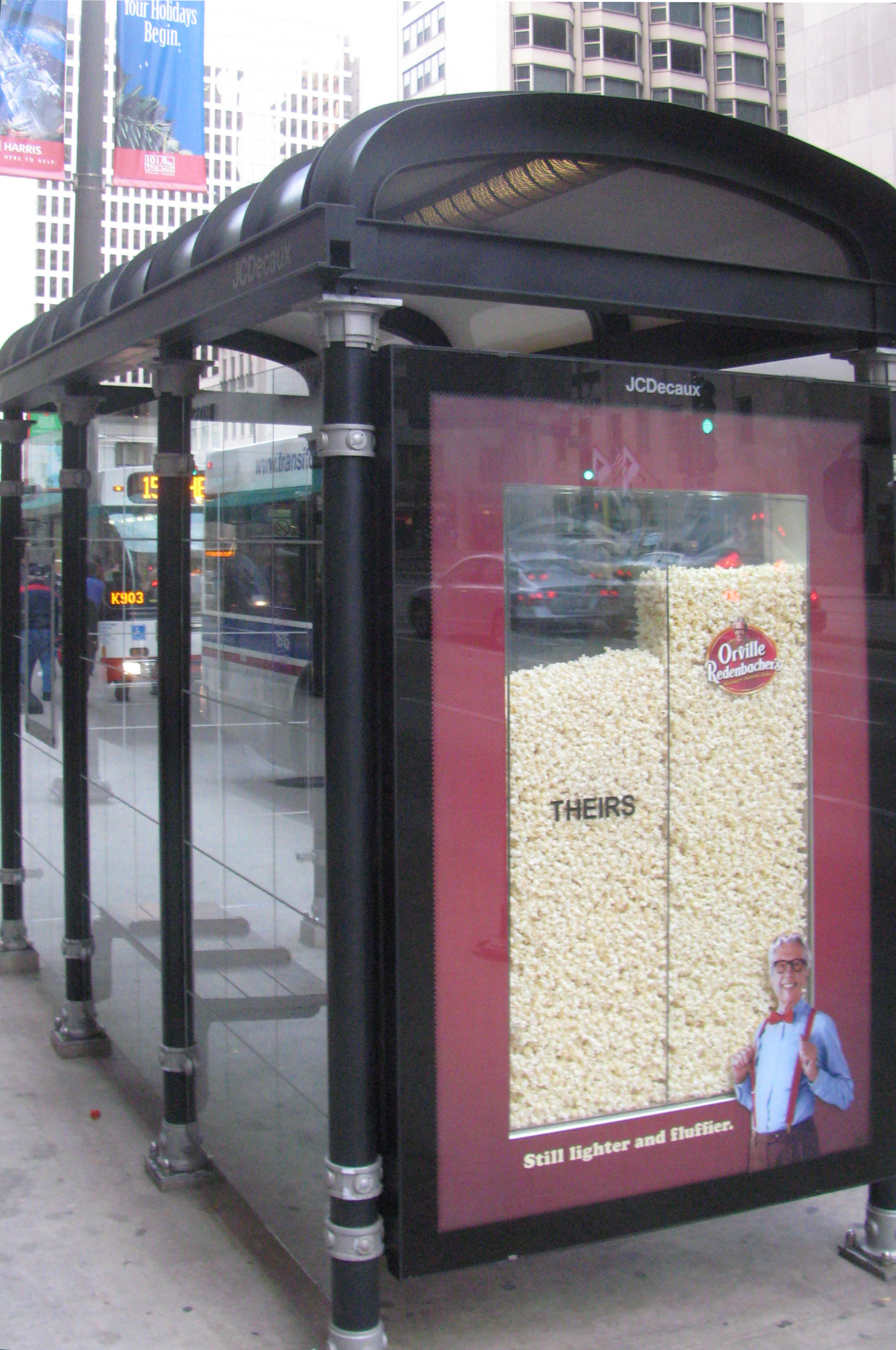
City of Chicago bus stop, served by CTA buses, with 3D ad

CTA has approximately 2,000 buses that operate over 152 routes and 2,273 route miles (3,658 km). Buses provide about 1 million passenger trips a day and serve more than 12,000 posted bus stops. The city's rapid transit system, known as the "Chicago 'L'" or variations of 'L', "El", or "el" to Chicagoans, operates 1,190 rapid transit cars along eight routes and 222 miles (357 km) of track. CTA trains provide about 745,000 customer trips each day and serve 144 stations in Chicago, Evanston, Skokie, Wilmette, Rosemont, Forest Park, Oak Park, and Cicero.

Chicago is one of the few cities in the United States that provides rapid transit service to two major airports. From the downtown area, the Blue Line reaches O'Hare International Airport in about 40 minutes, while the Orange Line takes customers to Midway Airport in about 25 minutes from the Loop.

=== Bus services ===
==== Suburban ====
Pace, another service board of the Northern Illinois Transit Authority, operates a primarily-suburban bus service that also offers some routes into Chicago.

Pace came into existence in 1985 under that name, and as an operating agency in 1995. It absorbed routes previously operated by a suburban town (e.g., Wilmette Wilbus) or a private company. Suburban operators ran into the same funding problems as those operating inside Chicago and evoked a similar response from area governments. Pace is the regional public sector response to keep local and regional bus service available in the Chicago metro area.

With its vast service area, Pace had a weekday daily ridership of 1,195,308 in November 2023.

==== Intercity ====
Several intercity bus companies offer service to other cities in Illinois and across the United States. Most operate to and from the Greyhound Lines terminal, located at 630 West Harrison Street (corner of Des Plaines Street). Greyhound Lines operates the majority of the intercity bus service to and from Chicago, with routes connecting Chicago with Indianapolis, Cincinnati, Louisville, Nashville, Atlanta, Cleveland, Pittsburgh, Washington, New York, Detroit, Toronto, Milwaukee, Green Bay, Madison, Minneapolis, St. Louis, Memphis, intermediate points, and connecting with other points beyond. Both Barons Bus Lines and Miller Transportation connect Chicago with Fort Wayne and Columbus. Indian Trails connects Chicago with Kalamazoo, Lansing, Flint, and Bay City. Burlington Trailways connects Chicago with Rockford, Dubuque, Davenport, Burlington, Des Moines, Omaha, and Denver.

Other intercity bus companies use their own separate intercity bus terminals. Megabus, a subsidiary of Coach USA, departs from a curbside bus stop near Union Station, on Canal Street south of Jackson Boulevard, and connects Chicago with Indianapolis, Cincinnati, Louisville, Nashville, Cleveland, Columbus, Cleveland, Detroit, Milwaukee, Madison, Minneapolis, Des Moines, Omaha, St. Louis, Memphis, Kansas City, intermediate points, and connecting with other points beyond. Van Galder Bus Company, another subsidiary of Coach USA, departs from a curbside bus stop at Union Station, on Canal Street north of Jackson Boulevard, and connects Chicago with Rockford and Madison. Several bus companies catering to Hispanic passengers connect Chicago with points in Texas, and with connections throughout Mexico. These companies include El Expreso Bus Company, Omnibus Express, Los Paisanos Autobuses, Tornado Bus Company, Turimex Internacional, Price 4 Limo., National Charter Bus, Chicago Charter Bus Company and GOGO Charters.

=== Rail services ===
==== Commuter ====
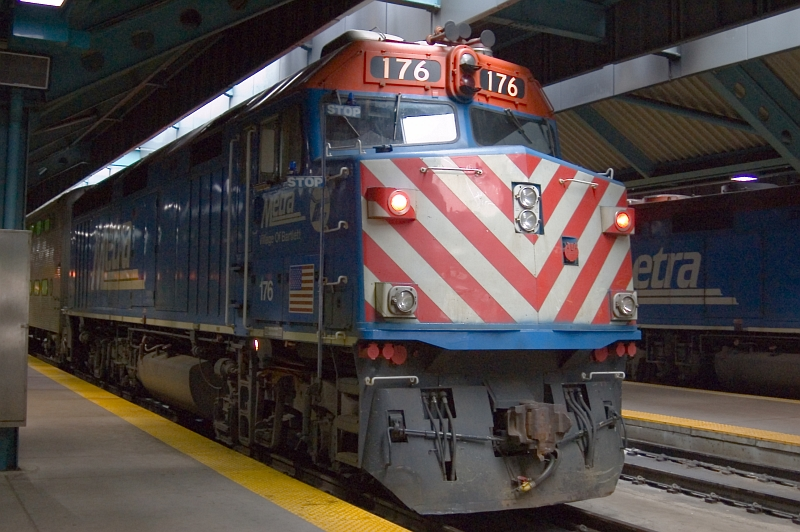
Metra train at Ogilvie Transportation Center

Metra, another service board of the Northern Illinois Transit Authority, is Chicago's commuter railroad, with eleven lines that serve 200+ stations across Cook County and the five collar counties. Unlike the 'L' lines, fare pricing is based on zones instead of a flat boarding fee. In addition, being mainly commuter rail service, frequent service is generally only provided during rush hours, although Metra is known for its speed and reliability. There are eleven lines, three of which also have service along additional branch lines: in addition to the main lines, the Metra Electric District has two branches, and the Rock Island District and Union Pacific Northwest have one branch each. Each line connects into one of four different downtown stations: Union Pacific North, West, and Northwest arrive in the Richard B. Ogilvie Transportation Center (known more casually as the "North Western Station", its original name under Chicago and North Western); Milwaukee District North and West, North Central Service, SouthWest Service, BNSF Railway, and Heritage Corridor converge in Union Station (which is also the nexus of Amtrak); the Rock Island District arrives in the LaSalle Street Station; and the Metra Electric District arrives in Millennium Station (formerly Randolph Street Terminal).

The Metra Electric District is Chicago's oldest continuing commuter train (1856), and shares the railway with the South Shore Line, operated by the Northern Indiana Commuter Transit District (NICTD), which is a separate but analogous quasi-governmental entity, partially funded by the RTA. The South Shore Line is an interurban railroad that operates between Chicago and South Bend, Indiana. Like the Metra Electric District, it arrives and departs from Millennium Station.

==== Intercity ====
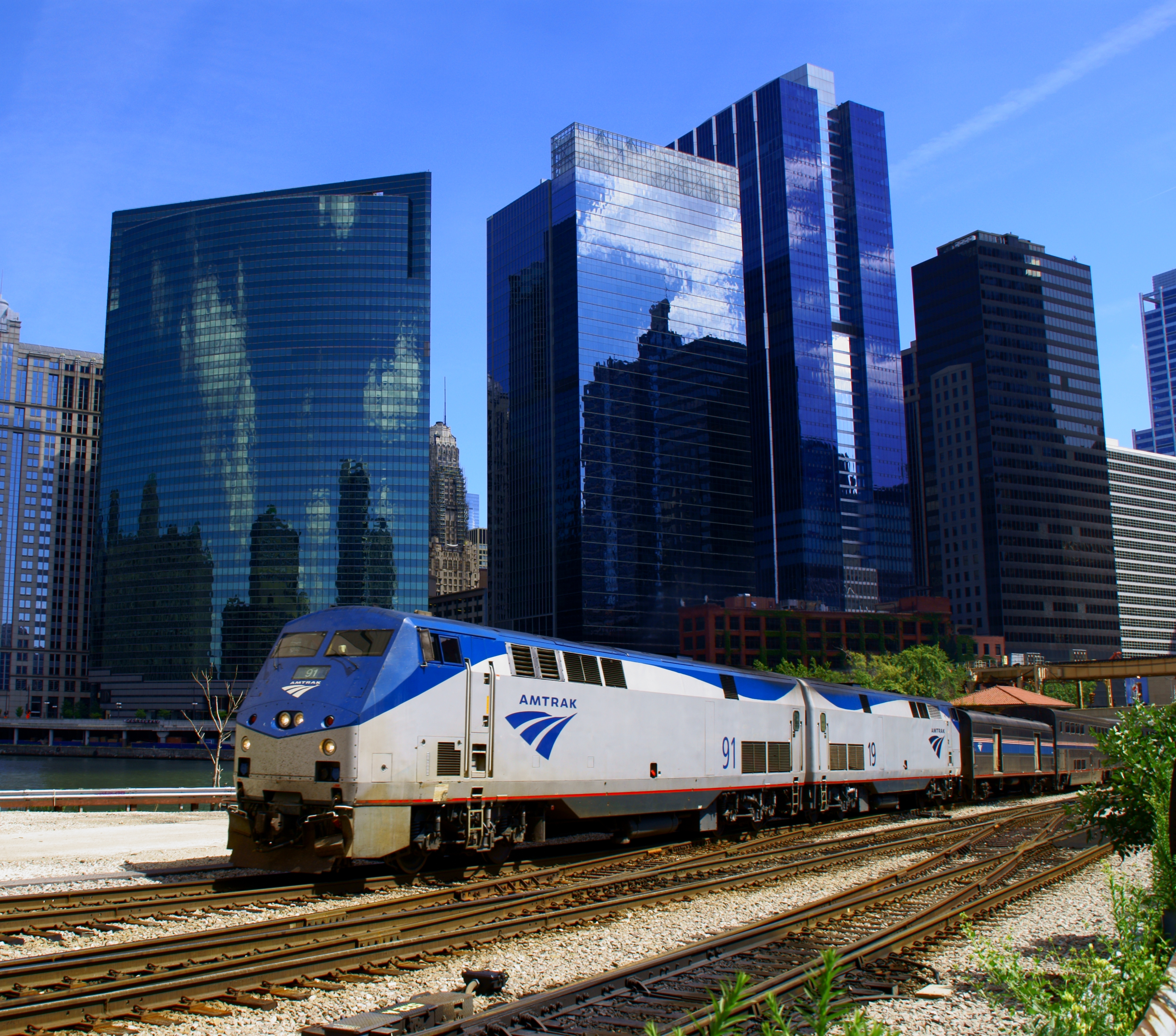
Amtrak's Empire Builder departs Union Station.

Amtrak owns and operates Union Station, the fourth-largest intercity passenger hub in the United States. The station is the focus of many of Amtrak's transcontinental routes. Unlike most of Amtrak's major stations, all trains calling at Union Station either originate or terminate there; passengers coming through Chicago must transfer to another train to reach their destination. It provides connections to Metra and the "L".

Before Amtrak's takeover of passenger service in 1971, trains ran out of Central Station, Dearborn Station, LaSalle Street Station and Chicago and North Western Terminal as well as Union Station.

==== Chicago Express Loop ====
The Chicago Express Loop is a proposed high speed rapid transit line connecting the Loop to O'Hare airport.

=== Tourist trolleys ===
The City of Chicago offered free tourist trolleys that served the downtown area. The "trolleys" were actually buses painted to look like historical streetcars. They ran every 20 to 30 minutes and served areas popular with tourists that did not have 'L' stations, such as the Museum Campus, Navy Pier, and the Magnificent Mile. The Free Trolley service was permanently discontinued in 2009.

The free trolleys should not be confused with the private-sector Chicago Trolley Company, which offers guided tours and charge fares. They serve different routes but largely the same downtown area. Their vehicles are also buses rather than real trolleys.

=== Chicago public transportation statistics ===
The average Chicago commuter spends 86 minutes every day traveling to and from work on public transit. Of public transit riders, 28.% ride for more than 2 hours every day. On average, commuters wait at stops or stations for 15 minutes; 21% of riders wait for over 20 minutes. The average trip is 6.3 miles (10.1 km), while 28.% travel over 7.5 miles (12.1 km) in a single direction.

== Taxis ==
Chicago taxicabs are privately operated under a medallion license from the city. Chicago taxi regulations were revamped in a 2012 reform package backed by Mayor Rahm Emanuel; the package raised the "flag pull" initial hire charge by $1, mandated credit card readers and GPS, and placed new limits on fleet age.

City and private initiatives have increased the proportion of hybrid and alternative fuel vehicles from less than one percent to over 74 percent of the city's cab fleet since 2008.

== Water ==
Chicago waterways are used extensively for commercial shipping, passenger ferry service, and recreational boating. Navigable waterways within Chicago include Lake Michigan, the Chicago River, the Calumet River, and the Chicago Sanitary and Ship Canal. In part, these waterways comprise the Chicago Area Waterway System, which forms the only inland link between the Great Lakes and the Mississippi River. This potential link was a major factor in the establishment of Chicago itself.

=== Commercial shipping ===
The Port of Chicago, once centered on the Chicago River but since moved to the Lake Calumet area, is responsible for Chicago's commercial shipping traffic.

=== Passenger ferry service ===
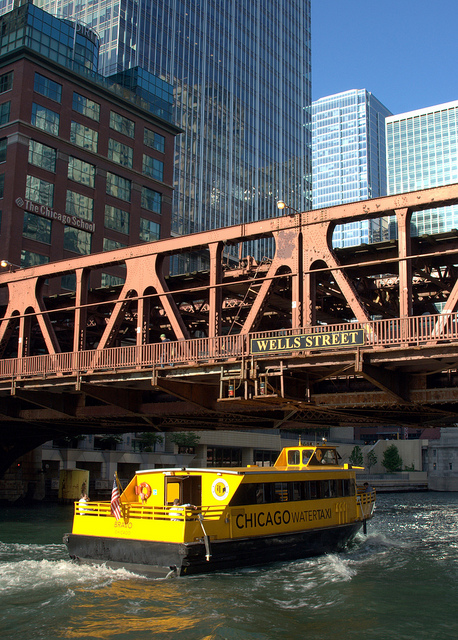
Water taxi in Chicago

Passenger ferry service in Chicago is handled by commercial water taxis operating on defined routes on published schedules.

Shoreline Sightseeing offers water taxi service along the Chicago River with stops at Navy Pier, Michigan Avenue, and Adams Street. They offer a separate route from Navy Pier to the Museum Campus.

Wendella Boats operates the Chicago Water Taxi which offers scheduled service along the Chicago River with stops at Michigan Avenue, Clark Street, Madison Street (Ogilvie and Union train stations), Chicago Avenue, North Avenue, and Ping Tom Park in Chinatown.

=== Recreational boating ===
Recreational boat traffic in Chicago includes tour boats, sailboats, powerboats, electric boats, canoes, and kayaks. This traffic originates from numerous private and commercial marinas and slips, and the Chicago Park District operates a municipal harbor system for the seasonal storage of recreational watercraft in Lake Michigan. With accommodations for 6000 boats, it is the largest system of its kind in the nation. Boat rentals are available on both the Chicago River and within harbors on Lake Michigan.

== See also ==
- Chicago City Railway
- Taxicabs of Chicago
- Chicago Traction Wars
- Plug-in electric vehicles in Illinois § Chicago
