= Louisville Bus Station =

Intercity bus station in Louisville, Kentucky

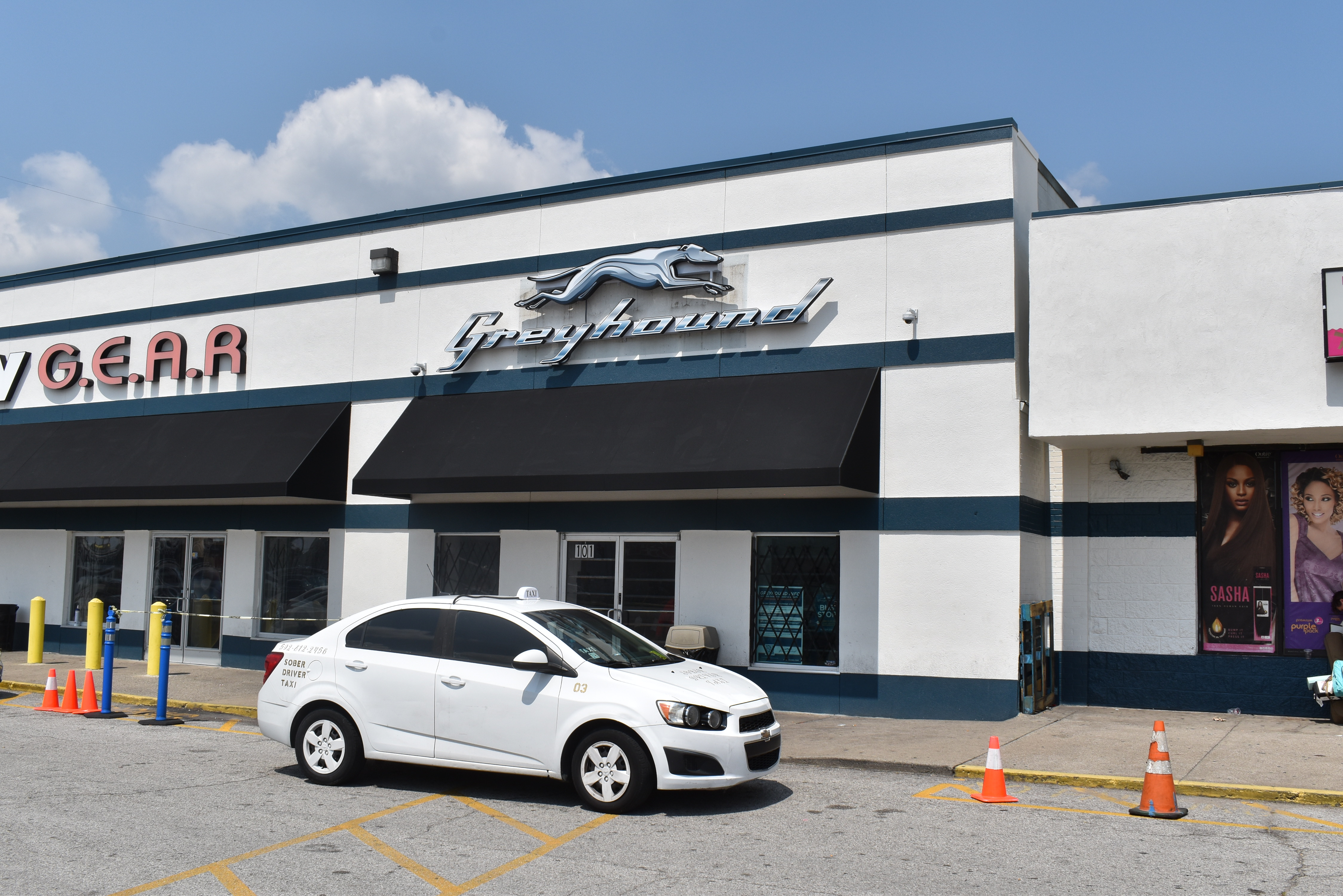
- The Louisville Bus Station in August 2023

General information
- Location: 1211 W Broadway, Ste 101, Louisville, Kentucky
- Coordinates: 38.248417°N 85.772513°W
- Operator: Greyhound Lines
- Bus operators: Barons Bus Lines; Flixbus; Greyhound Lines
- Connections: TARC 10, 12, 23, 99

Other information
- Website: Official website

History
- Opened: December 10, 1970
- Rebuilt: May 2, 2023
Location

The Louisville Bus Station is an intercity bus station in Louisville. The station, managed by Greyhound Lines, also serves Barons Bus Lines and Flixbus. The current station was opened in 2023.

Louisville has seen intercity bus transit since at least 1928, when a union bus station opened at 5th Street and Broadway. Later bus stations were purpose built in 1937 and 1970. This last station closed in 2023, when the current station opened in a repurposed strip mall.

== Attributes ==
The bus station sits within a strip mall southwest of downtown Louisville. The terminal is bordered by West Broadway to the south, 13th Street to the west and 12th Street Connector to the east. The main entrance is located off West Broadway. The bus station is managed by Greyhound Lines, but also serves Barons Bus Lines and Flixbus.

== History ==
=== Early stations ===
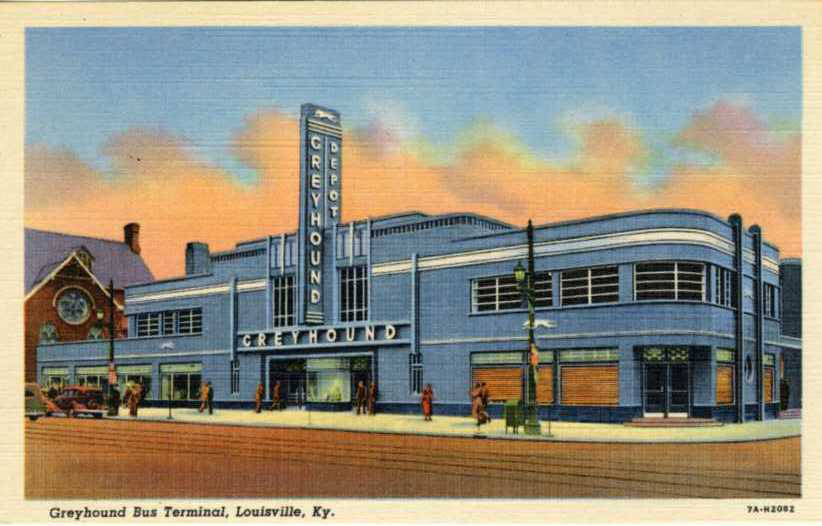
The 1937 Greyhound station

One of the earliest bus stations in Louisville opened on May 8, 1928, at the southeast corner of 5th Street and Broadway. This served as a union station with 140 buses departing daily.

This station would be replaced just nine years later, when a new terminal opened on April 28, 1937. This was also located at 5th Street and Broadway and opened to a large celebration with music, flowers, balloons and souvenirs. Designed by Wischmeyer-Arrasmith & Elswick and constructed by Dahlem Construction Company it used glass brick, porcelain enamel, chrome, and plate glass, steel, concrete and bright metals to create what was described as the most modern building in Louisville. This was the first Greyhound station designed by William Arrasmith. At $150,000, it was the largest use of porcelain enamel in the world and the first building in the country to have a large neon sign constructed as part of the building itself. In order to accommodate 100 arrivals and 1,500 daily passengers and an expected doubling of passengers, there were 15 sawtooth loading platforms.

By the late 1960s, a new terminal was desired to replace the aging location at 5th Street and Broadway. After two years of debate, Greyhound bought a location from the Urban Renewal Commission for $400,000 at 720 Walnut Street (now Muhammad Ali Boulevard). On December 8, 1970, a VIP cocktail party was held at the new station to celebrate with 150 guests. The last buses departed from the 1937 station to Chicago and Fort Knox late in the evening on December 9. At 12:01am on December 10, 1970, the first bus arrived at the new station from Fort Knox. This new station, built at a cost $1.75 million, used sandblasted concrete verticals and horizontals as the primary architectural feature.

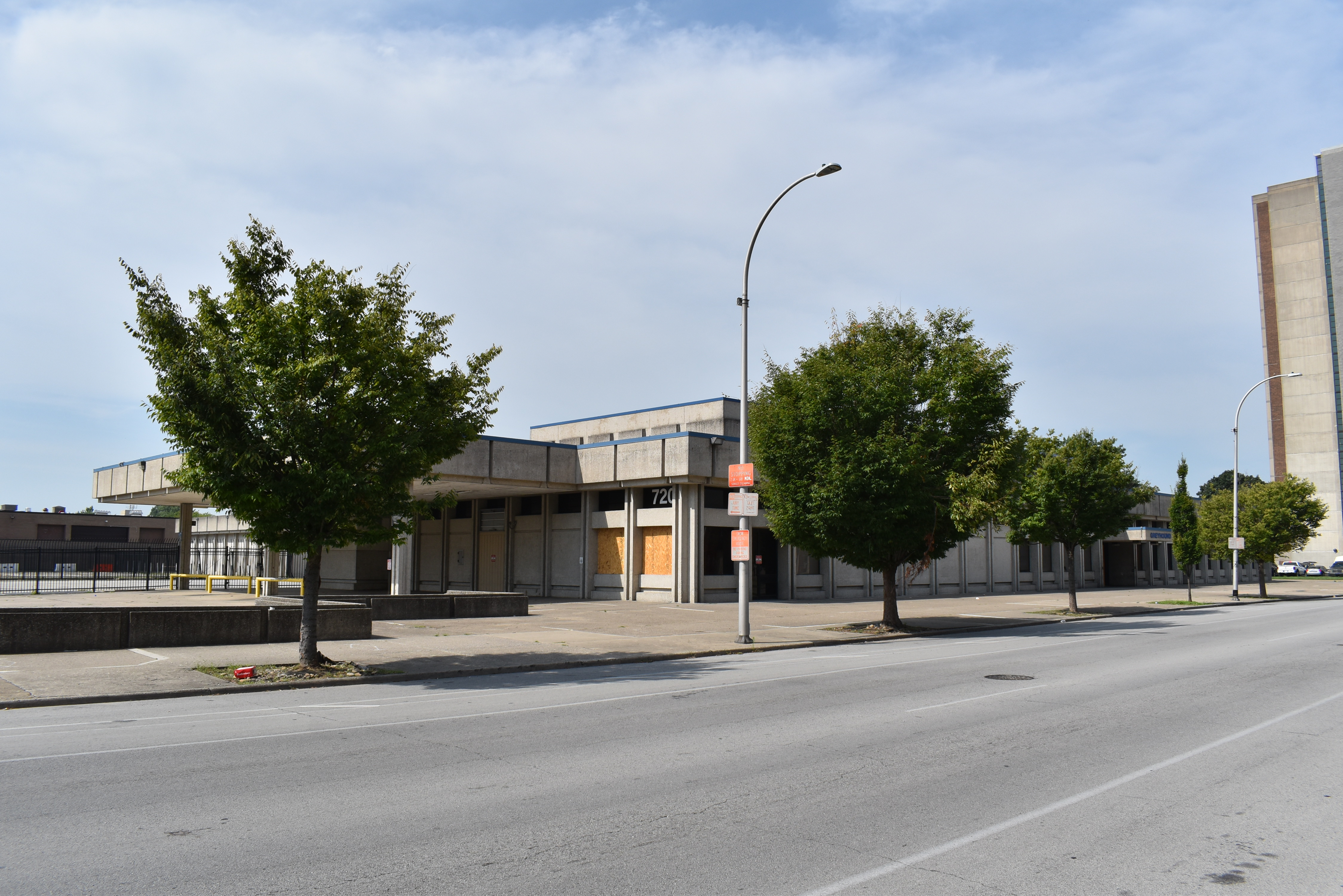
The 1970 station after closure in 2023

=== Current station ===
In 2021, Greyhound was sold to FlixMobility, the owner of Flixbus. However, this did not include any bus stations and later that year, the downtown Greyhound station was sold to LDG Development for $2.8 million with the intention of redeveloping the site for a five-story, 256-apartment affordable housing project. In turn, Greyhound proposed moving to a former Hertz location at 4826 Preston Highway near the Louisville Airport.

However, that did not come to pass, and buses began stopping at 1211 West Broadway on May 2, 2023, without notice. This location is in a strip mall, with orange and white jersey barriers denoting the loading area. The location is meant to be temporary until a move to Preston Highway can take place. On May 6, 2024, demolition of the 1970 station began.

== See also ==
- Louisville Union Station
- List of Greyhound Bus stations
