= Dayton Bus Station =

Intercity bus station in Dayton, Ohio

Dayton Trotwood Bus Station
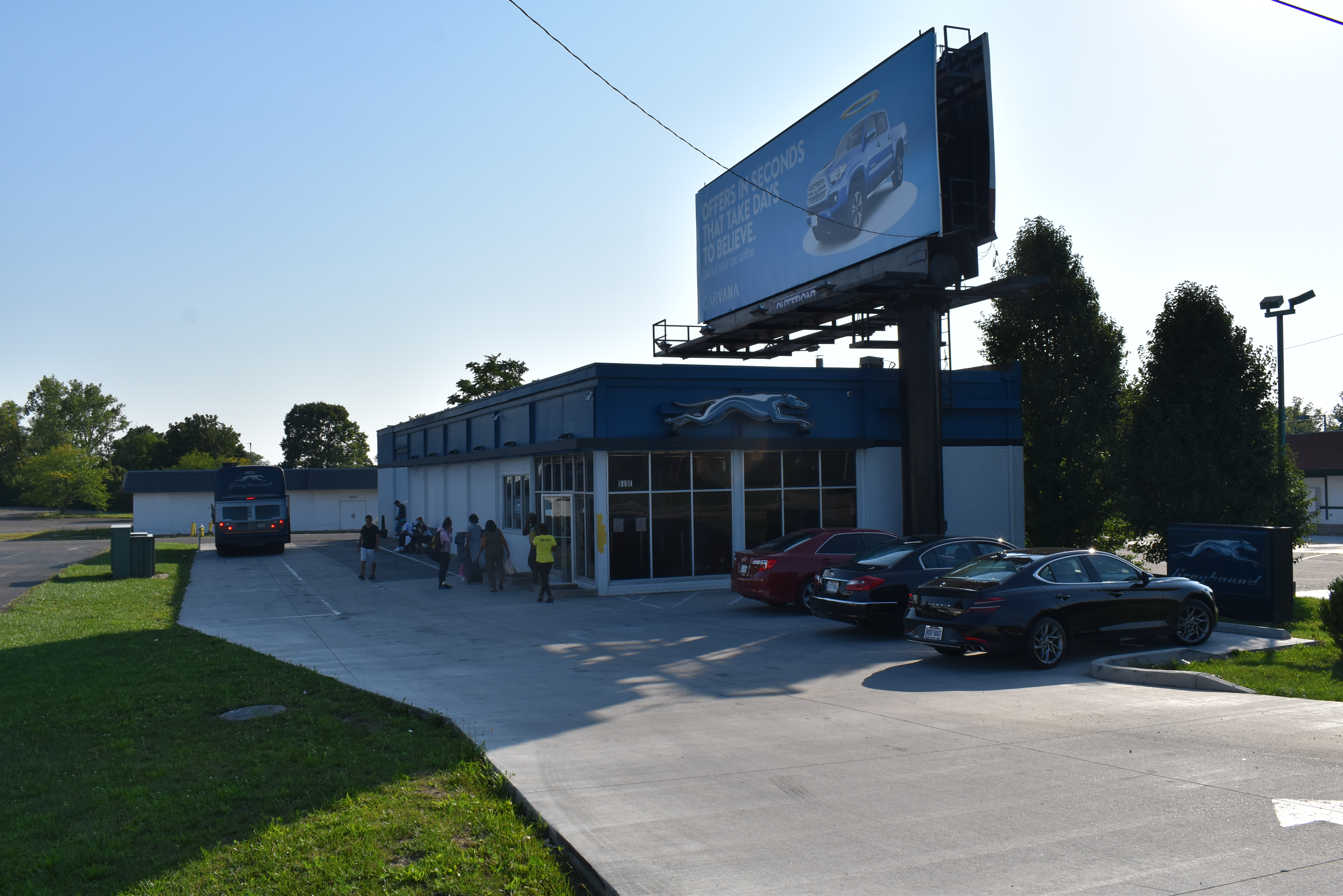
- The Dayton Trotwood Bus Station in August 2023

General information
- Location: 5136 Salem Ave, Trotwood, Ohio
- Coordinates: 39.817579°N 84.278138°W
- Operator: Greyhound Lines
- Bus operators: Barons Bus Lines; Flixbus; Greyhound Lines
- Connections: RTA 2, 8, 9, 16, 70, 71

Other information
- Website: Official website

History
- Opened: March 9, 1940
- Rebuilt: October 30, 2019
Location

The Dayton Trotwood Bus Station is an intercity bus station in Trotwood, a suburb of Dayton, Ohio. The station, managed by Greyhound Lines, also serves Barons Bus Lines and Flixbus. The current station opened in 2019.

Dayton has seen intercity bus transit since the at least 1929, when a Central Bus Terminal opened at 4th and Wilkinson streets. Numerous other downtown bus stations operated through the 20th century, but by the 2010s, intercity bus service had left downtown for the northwestern suburbs. The present location opened in 2019.

== Attributes ==
The bus station building sits in Trotwood, northwest of Dayton proper. The terminal is located off of Salem Avenue near Covenant House Drive. The bus station is managed by Greyhound Lines, but also serves Barons Bus Lines and Flixbus.

== History ==
=== Early stations ===
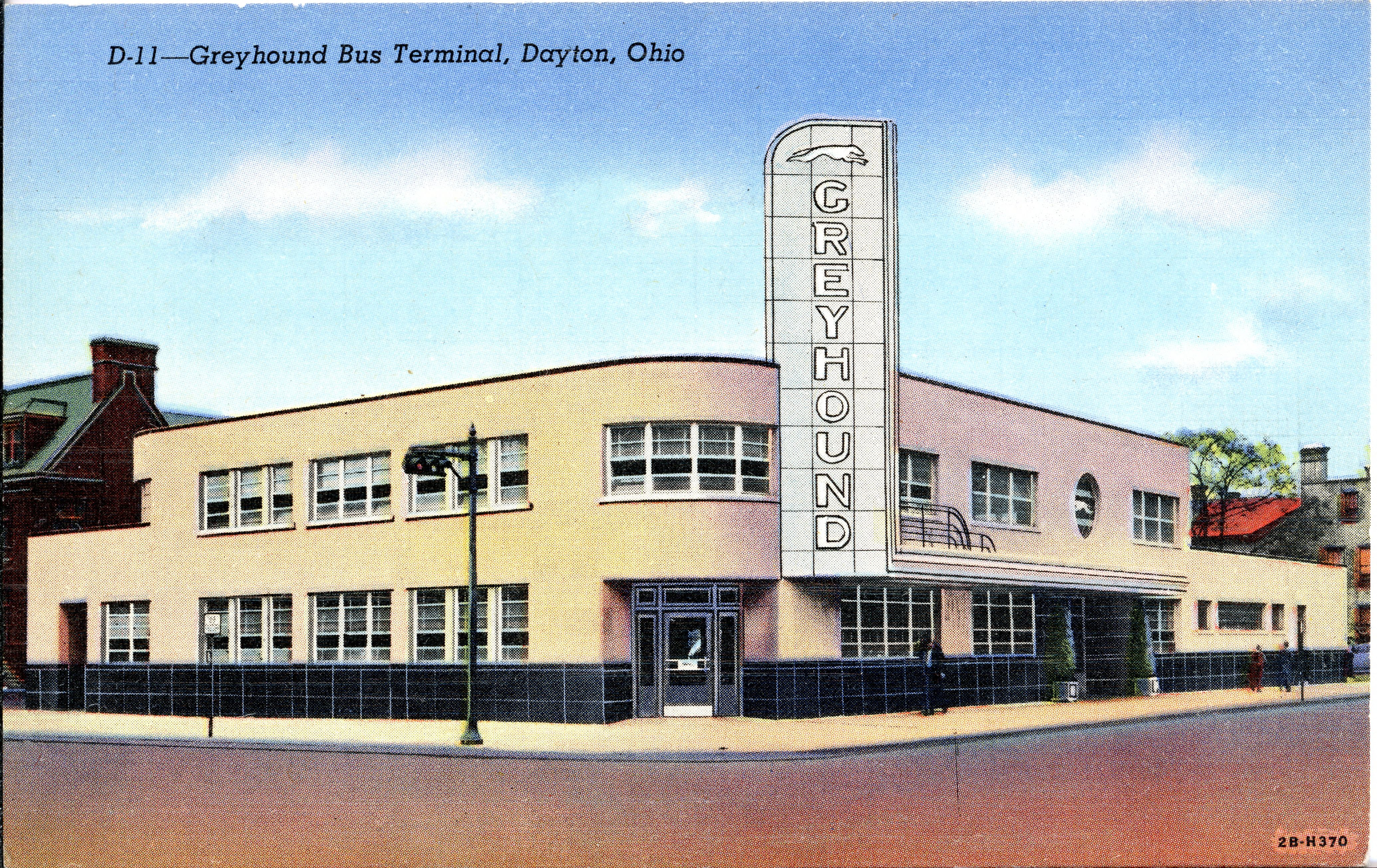
The 1940 Greyhound station

On July 27, 1929, the largest and best equipped intercity bus station in Ohio opened in Dayton. Located at the northeast corner of 4th and Wilkinson streets, it replaced a smaller station. This would become the Central Bus Terminal, from where Greyhound, King Brothers Transportation Co., Dayton & Germantown Bus Line, Dayton & Lewisburg Bus Line, Dayton & Farmersville Bus Line, Dayton & Osborne Bus Line, and Miami Valley Transportation Co. would run their bus services.

Work had started on May 1 of that year, and within a few short months, the station was complete with modern amenities including a barbershop and restaurant. The terminal was designed by Geyer & Neuffer, with Charles H. Shook & Co. as contractors. This impressive facility was necessary to accommodate the 250,000 Greyhound passengers in 1928, with 10 buses traveling the route from St. Louis to Pittsburgh and 19 buses from Covington to Detroit stopping here daily.

While a marvel of its time, by 1940 Greyhound required a new facility due to a proposed post office addition. This new Union Bus Station location was found at 201 West 1st Street. The streamline moderne design would cost $150,000 with new sawtooth loading platforms and serve six companies in addition to Greyhound. These were Germantown-Dayton, Dayton & Xenia, Cincinnati & Lake Erie, Dayton & Northern, King Brothers, and Ohio Bus Lines. The new station opened March 9, 1940 with Greyhound as the owner, collecting a commission from the ticket sales of smaller lines.

By the 1970s, the station and downtown Dayton were losing their shine, and a modern station was desired to boost bus travel. Therefore, the city offered Greyhound $500,000 for their station site, on which a parking garage would be built. In turn, Greyhound would move into the under-construction municipal Transportation Center at 5th and Jefferson streets. The Transportation Center opened on February 1, 1974, with a 1,400 space parking garage, but the bus station would not be ready to use until late 1975.

The Transportation Center, designed by Brown & Head & Associates, would incorporate a Post House restaurant, game room, cafeteria, eight bus bays, and a 48-seat waiting area. At 11:45pm on December 10, 1975, the last bus departed the old station bound for Panama City, Florida. The new station welcomed its first bus at 12:05am on the 11th, bound for Miami, Florida.

=== Trotwood stations ===
In 2009, the city proposed that Greyhound move to the Trotwood RTA hub. This would net the RTA $100,000 a year for the lease, while improving east–west bus service, which would have a stop closer to I70 and no longer have to go downtown. At the time, Greyhound had 19 buses serve Dayton on a daily basis. Greyhound moved to the hub in October 2009, with associated upgrades under construction from late 2010 to spring 2011.

A 2017 study identified Dayton as a "pocket of pain" due to a lack of quality intercity transportation options, noting that Dayton was the largest city without a bus or train stop in urban core in the country. In October 2019, the agreement between Greyhound and the RTA was allowed to expire, with Greyhound moving half a mile to a former Loanmax building. The converted station opened on October 30, 2019.

== See also ==
- Cincinnati Bus Station
