= Chicago Bus Station =

Intercity bus station in Chicago, Illinois

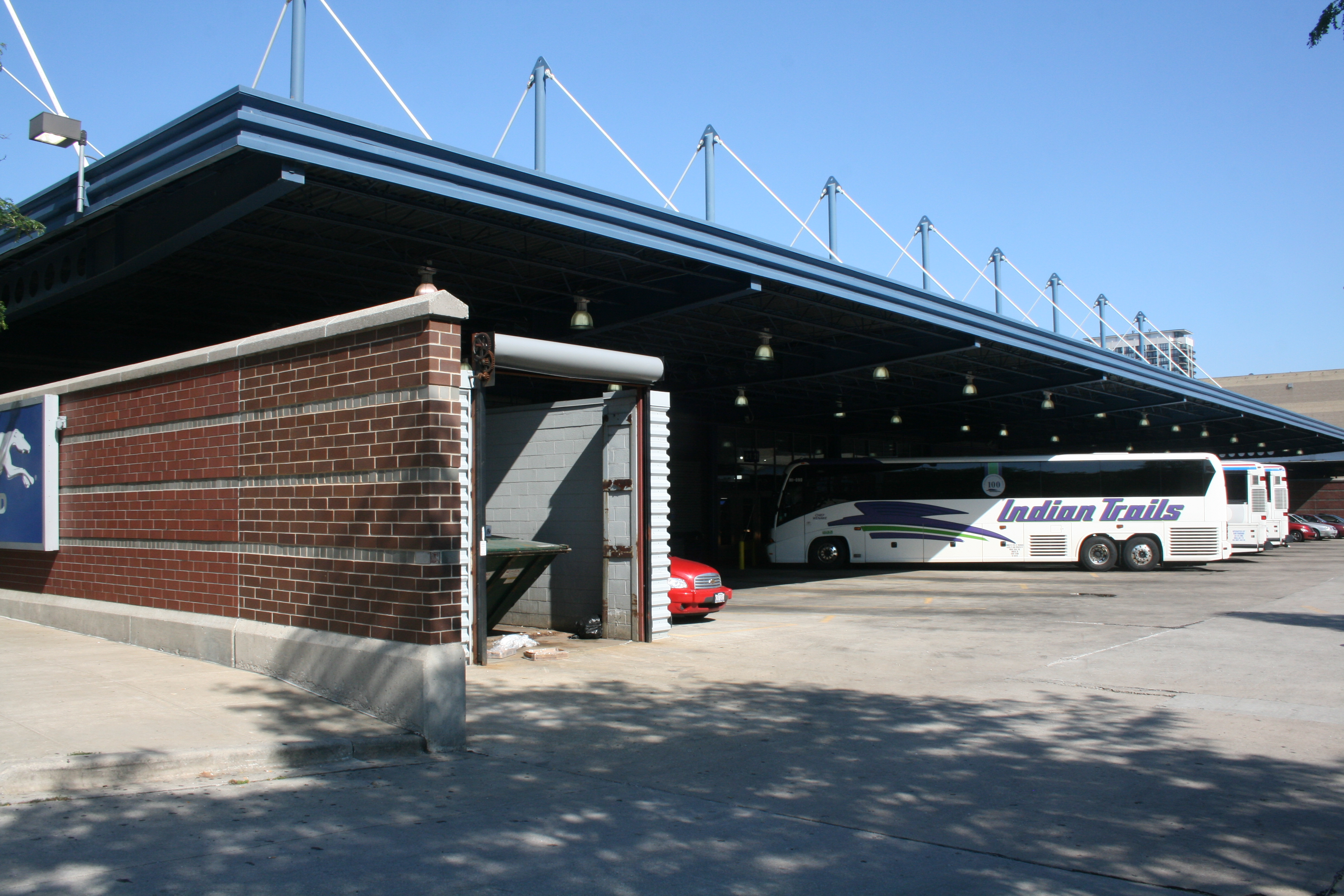
- The bus station in 2011

General information
- Location: 608 W Harrison St, Chicago, Illinois
- Coordinates: 41.8748°N 87.6432°W
- Owner: Twenty Lake Holdings
- Operator: Greyhound Lines
- Bus stands: 24
- Bus operators: Barons Bus Lines; Burlington Trailways; FlixBus; Greyhound Lines
- Connections: Blue at Clinton; CTA 7 60 125 157; Divvy

Construction
- Parking: None
- Architect: Nagle, Hartray & Associations

Other information
- Website: Official website

History
- Opened: December 7, 1989

Passengers
- 456,000-557,000 annually
Location

The Chicago Bus Station is an intercity bus station in the Near West Side, Chicago, Illinois. The station, managed by Greyhound Lines, also serves Barons Bus Lines, Burlington Trailways and Flixbus. The current building was constructed in 1989. Since it was built, the facility has been the only intercity bus station in the city.

Chicago has seen intercity bus transit since 1928, when a union station opened on Roosevelt Road, which served Greyhound Lines and other operators. In 1936, a Trailways bus terminal opened on Randolph Street, which would be in operation until 1987. In 1953, the union station was replaced by another Greyhound terminal, in a more centrally located building on Randolph Street. When the 1953 terminal opened, it was celebrated for bringing a modern terminal to a central location, however, it would later become known as a place of crime and lawlessness. The current bus station was built in 1989 and is for sale as of 2023.

== Description ==
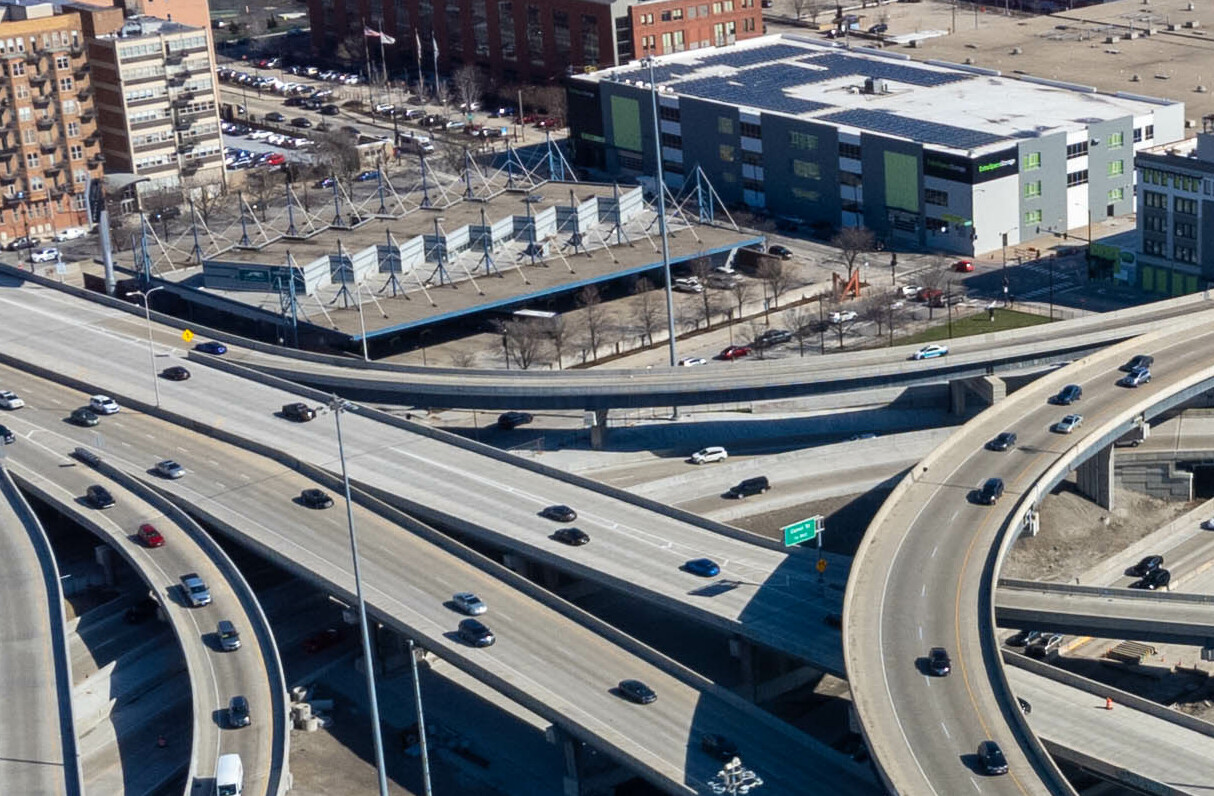
View from the Northwest

The Greyhound station building sits in the Near West Side community area, taking up one city block. The terminal is bordered by Tilden and Harrison streets to the north and south, and Des Plaines and Jefferson streets to the west and east. The station has 24 bays for boarding buses with the main entrance located on Harrison Street.

The bus station, managed by Greyhound Lines, also serves Burlington Trailways, Barons Bus Lines and Flixbus. Buses operated by Indian Trails, Miller Transportation, OurBus, Peoria Charter Coach Company, Van Galder Bus Company, and Wisconsin Coach Lines serve Chicago, but do not stop at the station. These curbside operators collectively provide approximately 54 daily trips and serve 340,000 to 390,000 annual passengers in downtown Chicago. As of 2023, the Greyhound station sees about 55 buses per day and 456,000 to 557,000 passengers annually.

The Greyhound location is considered an important site to city officials, given the proximity to the Chicago Loop and Amtrak service at Chicago Union Station.

== History ==
=== Early stations ===
The first intercity bus station in Chicago was the Union Bus Depot, which opened in 1928 at 1157 S. Wabash Ave. Greyhound Lines and other operators used the station from 1928 until 1953. While the bus facilities are long gone, the station building itself still exists as of 2023. The major competitor to Greyhound, Trailways, operated a bus station at 20 E. Randolph St. beginning in 1936, until its closing in 1987.

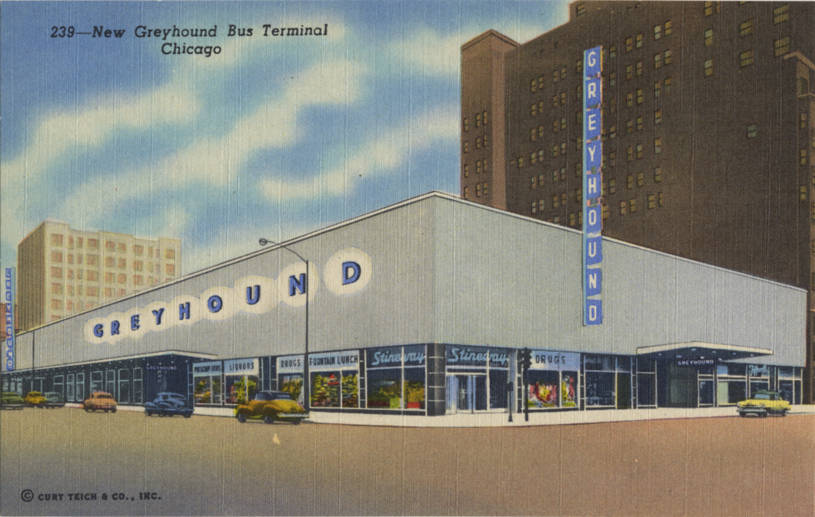
The 1953 station

In 1953, a new Greyhound bus terminal opened at 170 W. Randolph. Upon opening, it was the largest independently owned bus station in the world. The periodical Traffic Engineering wrote that the location in the heart of downtown would “ provide maximum convenience to bus travelers.” Buses could easily access the facility via Lower Wacker Drive. While it was originally celebrated for its modernity and location, it would later become better known for vice and crime. The Chicago Tribune columnist Bob Wiedrich wrote in 1977, “If you want to break your heart, pay a visit to the downtown Greyhound Bus terminal in Chicago. Spend a few hours watching the kind of human scum that drifts through its waiting rooms in search of easy prey.” Greyhound sold the site in 1986, and began looking for a site for a new station.

=== Current station ===
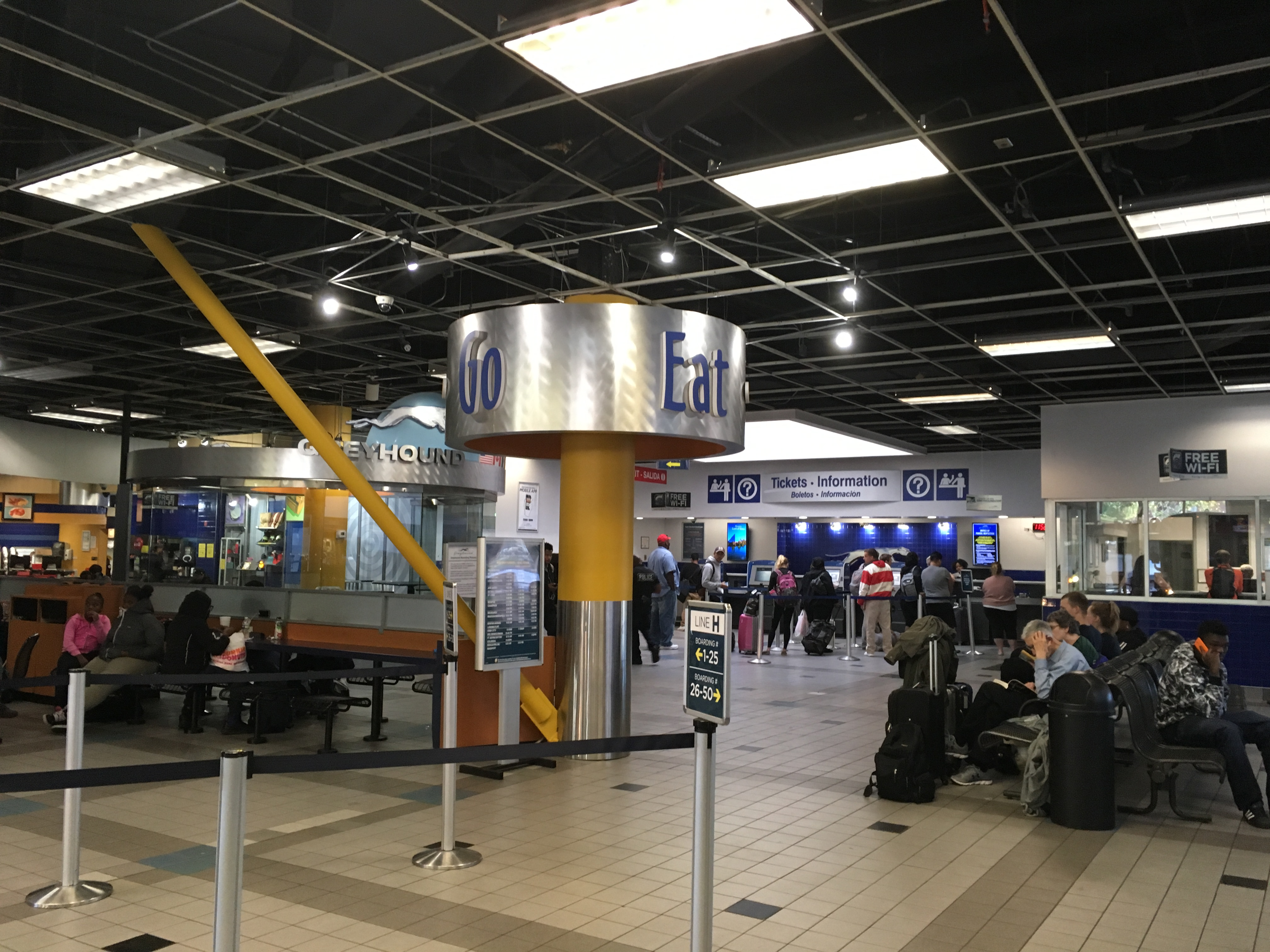
The waiting area

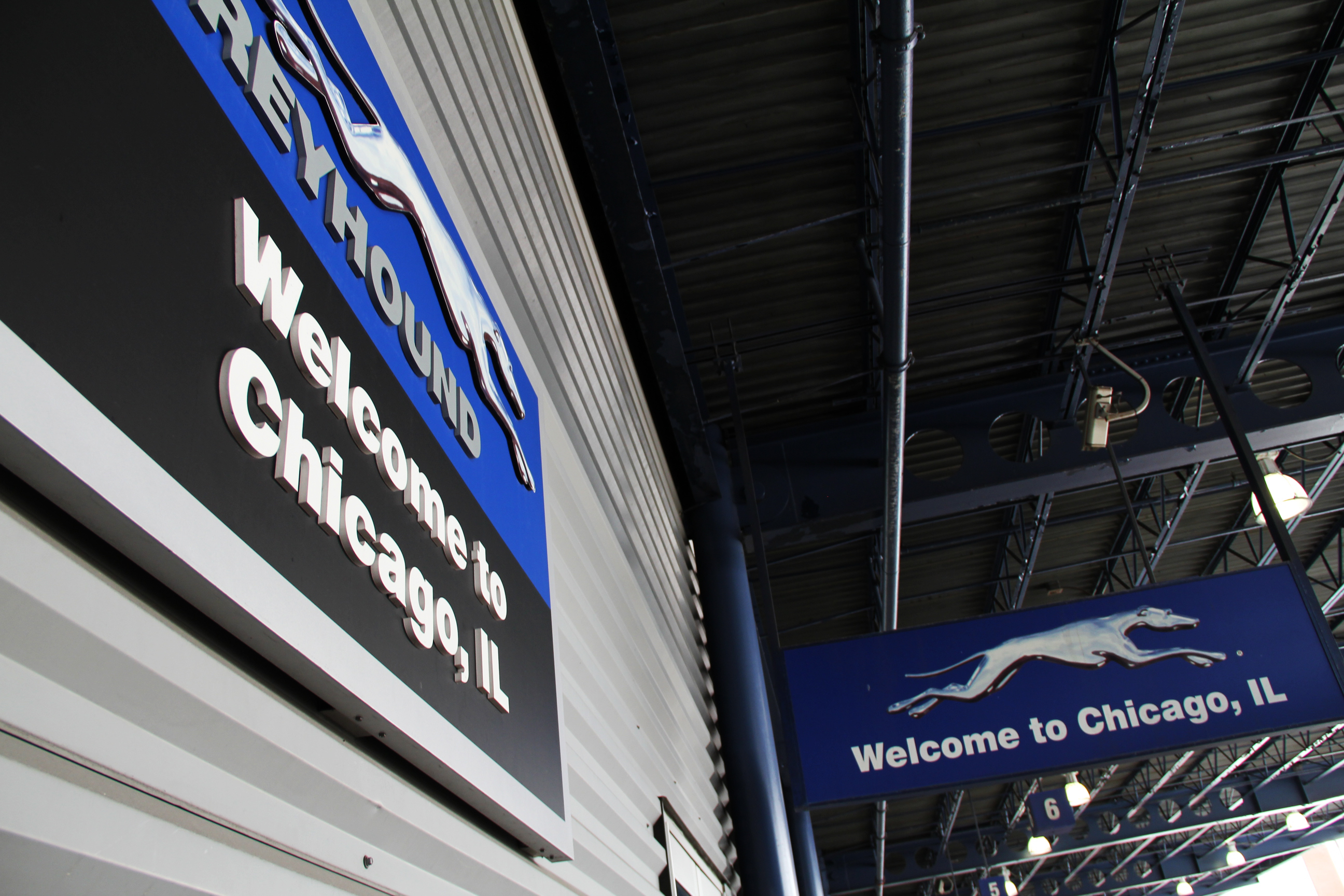
The signage upon entering the station

Greyhound first proposed building the new station on Addison Road, on the northwest side. Community opposition led Greyhound to choose the present site on Harrison Street. The new terminal designed by Nagle, Hartray & Associations was smaller than the old one, with glass doors on the east and west sides of the station to board buses. A skylit atrium allows in natural light at the center of the station. Architecture critic Paul Gapp wrote, “it's a pity that this good-looking bus terminal was not built downtown, where it belongs.”

In 2021, when Flixbus purchased Greyhound, the Chicago station and 32 others were not included in the sale. Instead, those stations were sold to Twenty Lake Holdings for $140 million. Following the sale of numerous other Greyhound stations in cities across the country, the Chicago station was put up for sale in early 2023. The 88,000 square foot site would likely sell for $20-$25 million and allow for the construction of two high rise towers. The DePaul University's Chaddick Institute of Metropolitan Development has asked the city to save the station and put it under public ownership, noting that the high passenger numbers and often unseasonable Chicago weather. The loss of the station would make Chicago the largest American city without an intercity bus station.

The Chicago Department of Transportation has been supportive of putting the station in public ownership and applied for a federal grant to do so. Putting the station in public ownership would allow the city to serve other bus operators which currently stop outside Chicago Union Station. Under public ownership, it would operate similarly to an airport, operated by the city and funded by fees paid by bus operators.

== See also ==
- Transportation in Chicago
- List of intercity bus stops in Illinois
