= Staunton station =

Rail station in Staunton, Virginia, US

Staunton, VA
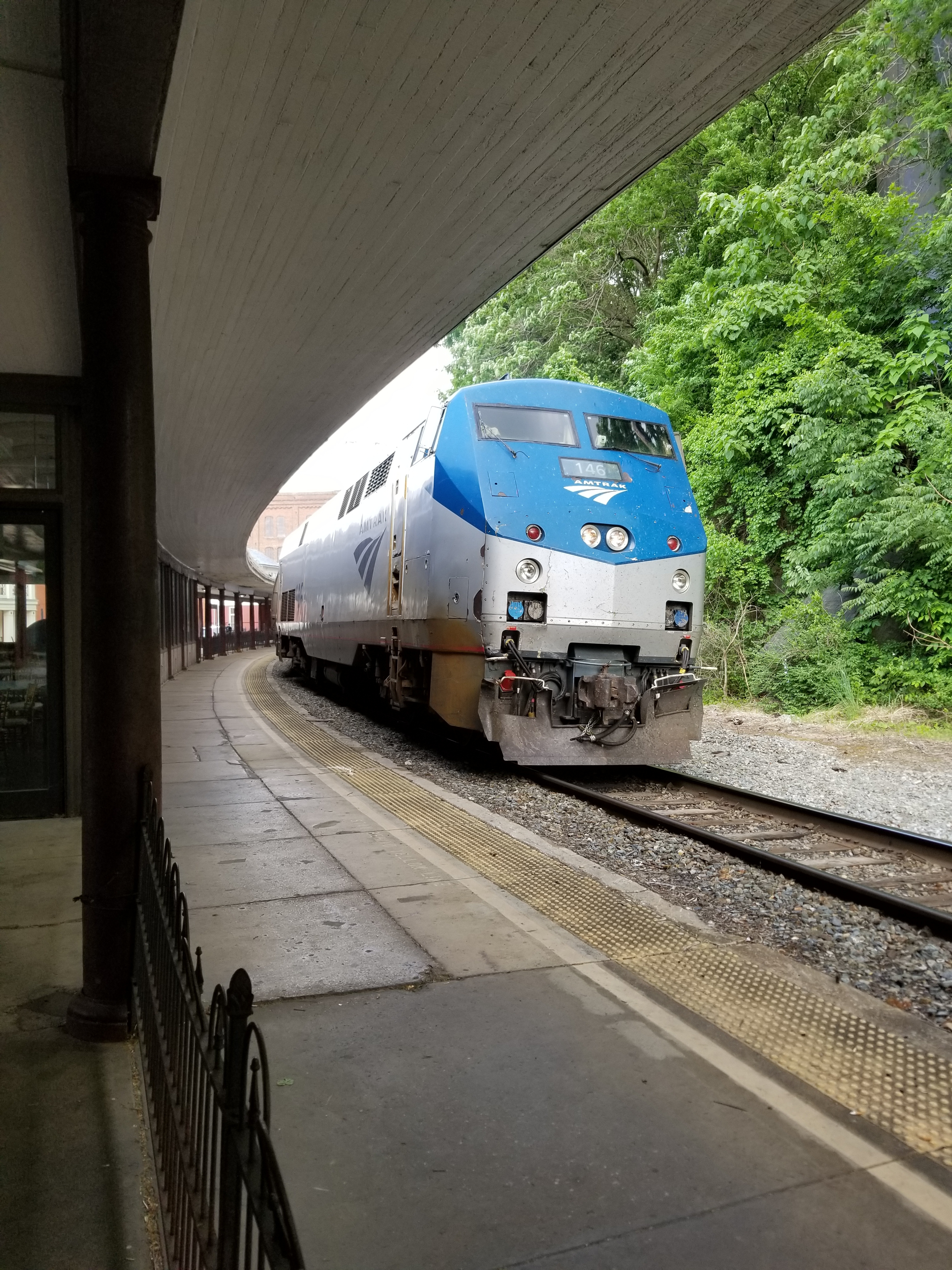
- Locomotive at the station in 2021

General information
- Location: 1 Middlebrook Avenue; Staunton, Virginia; United States
- Coordinates: 38°8′51″N 79°4′19.2″W
- Owner: MH Staunton, LLC
- Line: Buckingham Branch Railroad
- Platforms: 1 side platform
- Tracks: 1
- Connections: Staunton Trolley: Green Line Brite Bus Blue Ridge Community Connector BRCC and JMU

Construction
- Parking: short & long term
- Accessible: Platform only

Other information
- Station code: Amtrak: STA

History
- Opened: 1886 (signal house)

Passengers
- FY 2025: 5,519 (Amtrak)

Services
Preceding station	Amtrak	Following station
Clifton Forge toward Chicago	Cardinal	Charlottesville toward New York
Former services
Preceding station	Amtrak	Following station
Clifton Forge toward Chicago	James Whitcomb Riley 1974-1977	Charlottesville toward Washington, D.C. or Newport News
Clifton Forge toward Chicago	James Whitcomb Riley and George Washington 1971-1974	Charlottesville toward Washington, D.C. or Newport News
Preceding station	Chesapeake and Ohio Railway	Following station
Swoope toward Cincinnati	Main Line	Brand toward Washington, D.C. or Phoebus
Location

Staunton station is an Amtrak train station in Staunton, Virginia, located in the downtown Wharf Area Historic District of the city. It is served by Amtrak's Cardinal, which runs between New York and Chicago. The station has restricted restrooms and benches, but no ticket office.

== History ==
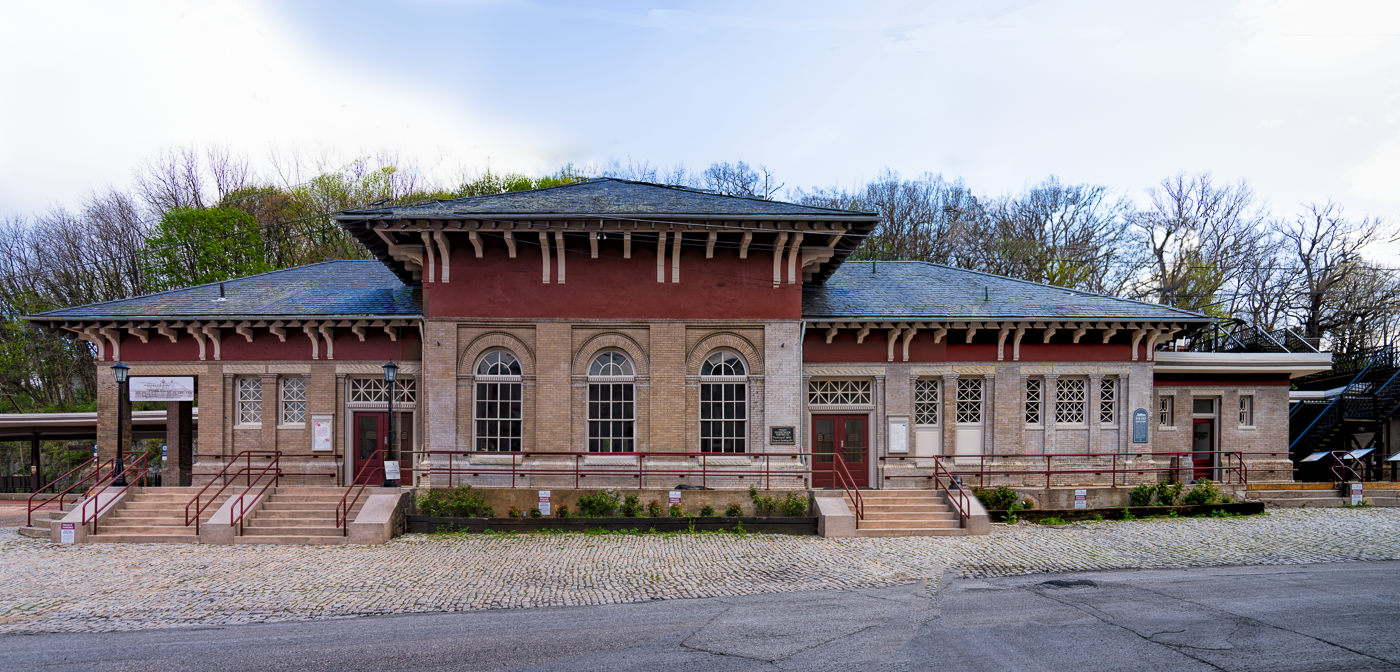
The 1902-built station in use as a restaurant in 2020

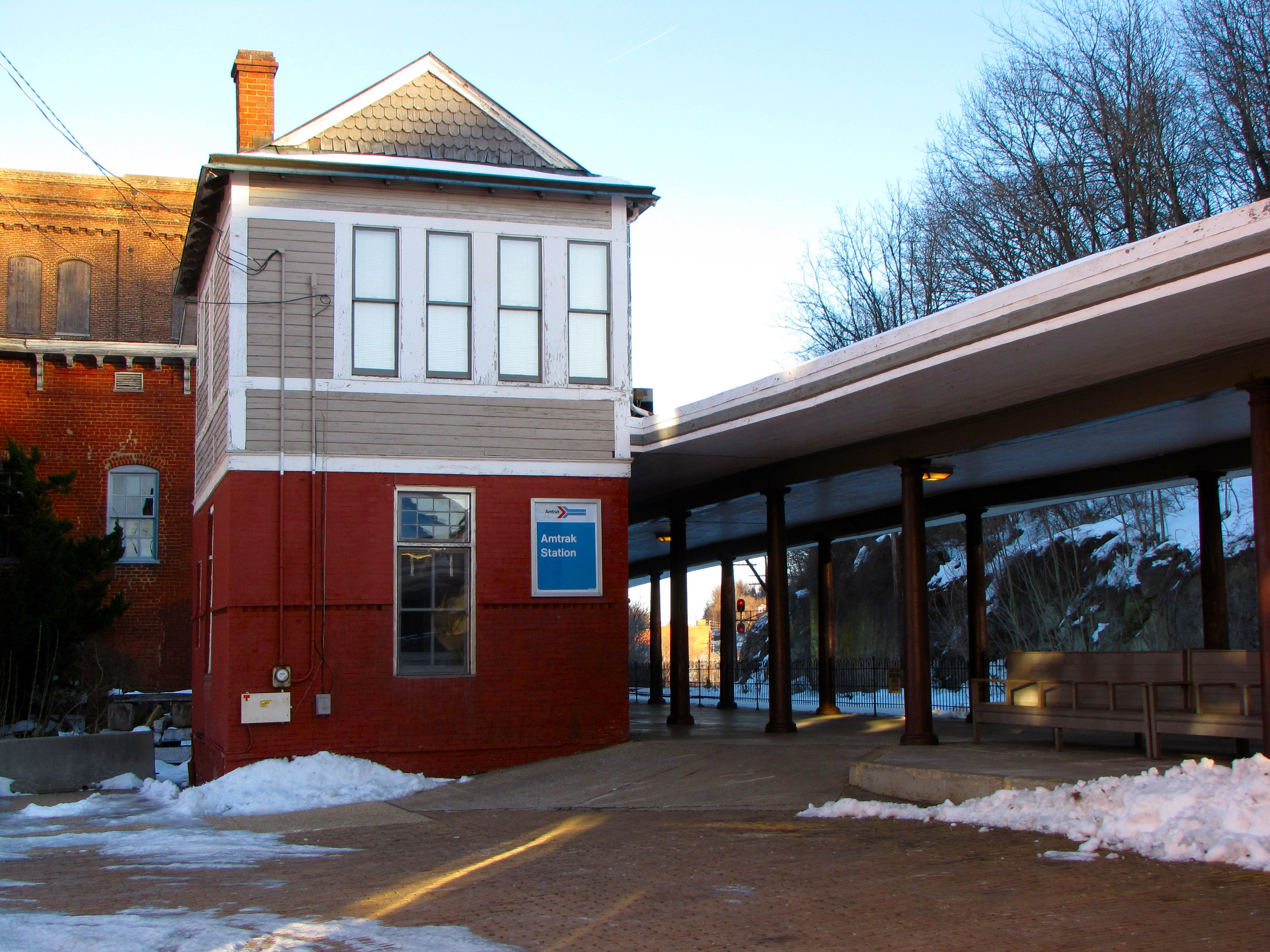
The station in 2009

The site of the station has been a railroad depot since 1854:

The present railroad station is the third one on this site. The first station was destroyed by [Union] General Hunter's troops in June of 1864. A runaway train at the turn-of-the-century [in 1890] destroyed the second station.

— Staunton in the Civil War

The third and existing station building was designed by Staunton architect Thomas Jasper Collins and built by the Chesapeake and Ohio Railway in 1902.

The current station facility is the former telegraph tower from when the Staunton station functioned as a full passenger and freight railroad depot. While the platform still functions as the railroad platform for loading and unloading passengers, the former station passenger and freight buildings are now occupied by a reception hall for events, replacing a restaurant. Next to the station is a Chessie System caboose.
