= Metro Magazine =

Metro
- Categories: Trade magazine
- Frequency: 10 per year
- Founded: 1904
- Company: Bobit Business Media
- Country: United States
- Based in: Torrance, California
- Language: English
- Website: metro-magazine.com
- ISSN: 1098-0083

Metro Magazine is a trade magazine for bus and rail transit and motorcoach operators, published in the United States since 1904, taking its current name in 1975. It is published monthly, except for July and December, by Bobit Business Media. The magazine is headquartered in Torrance, California.

== History ==
First published in 1904 as Electric Traction Weekly, the magazine became a monthly in 1912 and changed its name to the Electric Traction and Bus Journal in 1932. That name was relatively short-lived, being replaced by Mass Transportation in 1935. Its publisher at that time was Kenfield-Davis Publishing Company. In 1959, new owner Hitchcock Publishing renamed the magazine Modern Passenger Transportation, but in 1961 this was changed to Metropolitan Transportation and in 1965 yet again, to simply Metropolitan. In 1964 Bobit Publishing (now Bobit Business Media) purchased Metropolitan and in 1975 shortened the name to Metro (or Metro Magazine), which the magazine itself writes as METRO.
