= Cincinnati Bus Station =

Intercity bus station in Cincinnati, Ohio

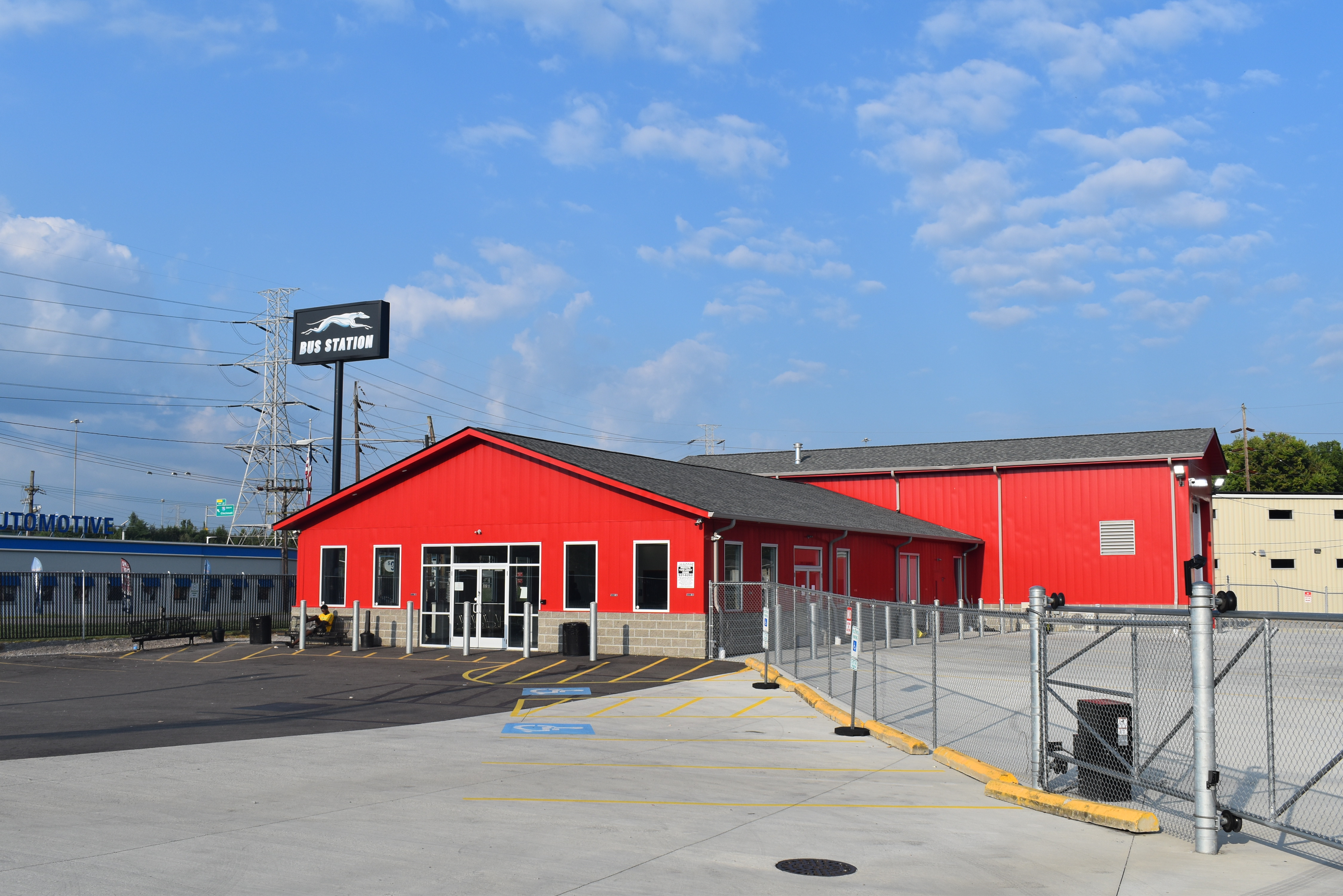
- The Cincinnati Bus Station in August 2025

General information
- Location: 398 E Galbraith Rd, Arlington Heights, Ohio
- Coordinates: 39.212741°N 84.459401°W
- Operator: Greyhound Lines
- Bus routes: 15
- Bus operators: Barons Bus Lines; Greyhound Lines
- Connections: Metro 43

Construction
- Parking: yes

Other information
- Website: Official website

History
- Opened: August 25, 1977
- Rebuilt: November 1, 2022

Passengers
- 382,868 (2008)
Location

The Cincinnati Bus Station is an intercity bus station in Arlington Heights, a suburb of Cincinnati, Ohio. The station, managed by Greyhound Lines, also serves Barons Bus Lines. The current location opened in 2022.

Cincinnati has seen intercity bus transit since at least 1932, when a Greyhound opened on Walnut Street. Numerous other bus stations operated through the mid 20th century, culminating with the opening of a new Greyhound station in 1977. This station would last until 2022, when service was moved to Arlington Heights.

== Attributes ==
The bus station building sits in Arlington Heights, just over the border from Cincinnati proper. The terminal is bordered by Galbraith Road to the south, Elliott Avenue to the north and Waldman Drive to the east. The main entrance is located on Waldman Drive. The bus station is managed by Greyhound Lines, but also serves Barons Bus Lines. Fifteen routes serve the station on a daily basis.

== History ==
=== Early stations ===
One of the earliest bus stations in Cincinnati opened on April 30, 1932 on Walnut Street near 7th Street with a ceremonial parade. The station served the Pennsylvania, Southeastern, Atlantic, Central, and Capital divisions of Greyhound, and the independent King Brothers Transportation Co., Ohio Bus Co. and Buckeye Stages.

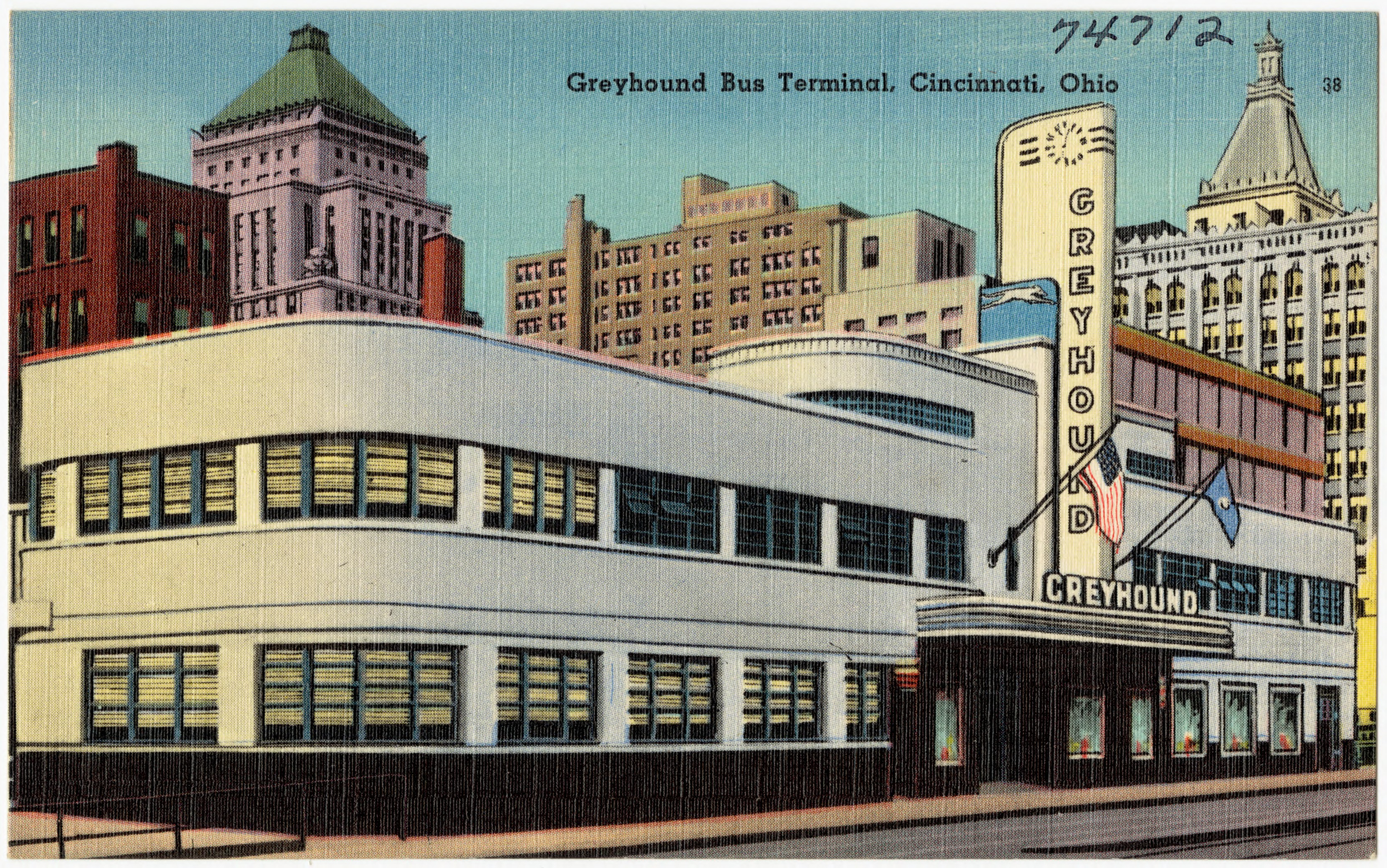
The 1942 Greyhound station

Within a decade, this station would become too small for Greyhound. Therefore, a new station was planned at the southwest corner of 5th and Sycamore streets. Construction began in October 1941 under J. & E. Contractors. The cut stone and steel station would cost $325,000 and include a restaurant and barber shop, 16 loading bays and second floor offices for Greyhound executives. A June 10, 1942 ribbon cutting was held by Mayor James Garfield Stewart with the first buses departing at 2am on the 11th. Upon opening, the station served 8,726 daily passengers on 300 scheduled buses operated by Greyhound Lines, King Bros. Lines, Ohio Bus Line Co., Blue Ribbon Lines, Greenfield-Cincinnati Bus Co. and Croswell Bus Co.

Numerous other terminals operated over the years serving Trailways and other carriers. For instance, a new station was planned for Indianapolis & Southeastern Trailways at the northeast corner of 5th and Sycamore streets, with an opening on May 1, 1946. A previous station for the company was located at 123 East Court Street.

By the 1960s, both the Greyhound and Trailways stations were beginning to show their age and both companies began to search for new locations. Trailways was looking to move from the corner opposite Greyhound at 5th and Sycamore streets a block away to 4th and Sycamore streets. By 1969, Procter and Gamble, the owners of the land on which the station was located, were looking to redevelop the site for an office tower. Trailways was able to secure a lease with the city, but by 1977 had moved again to 12th Street and Reading Road.

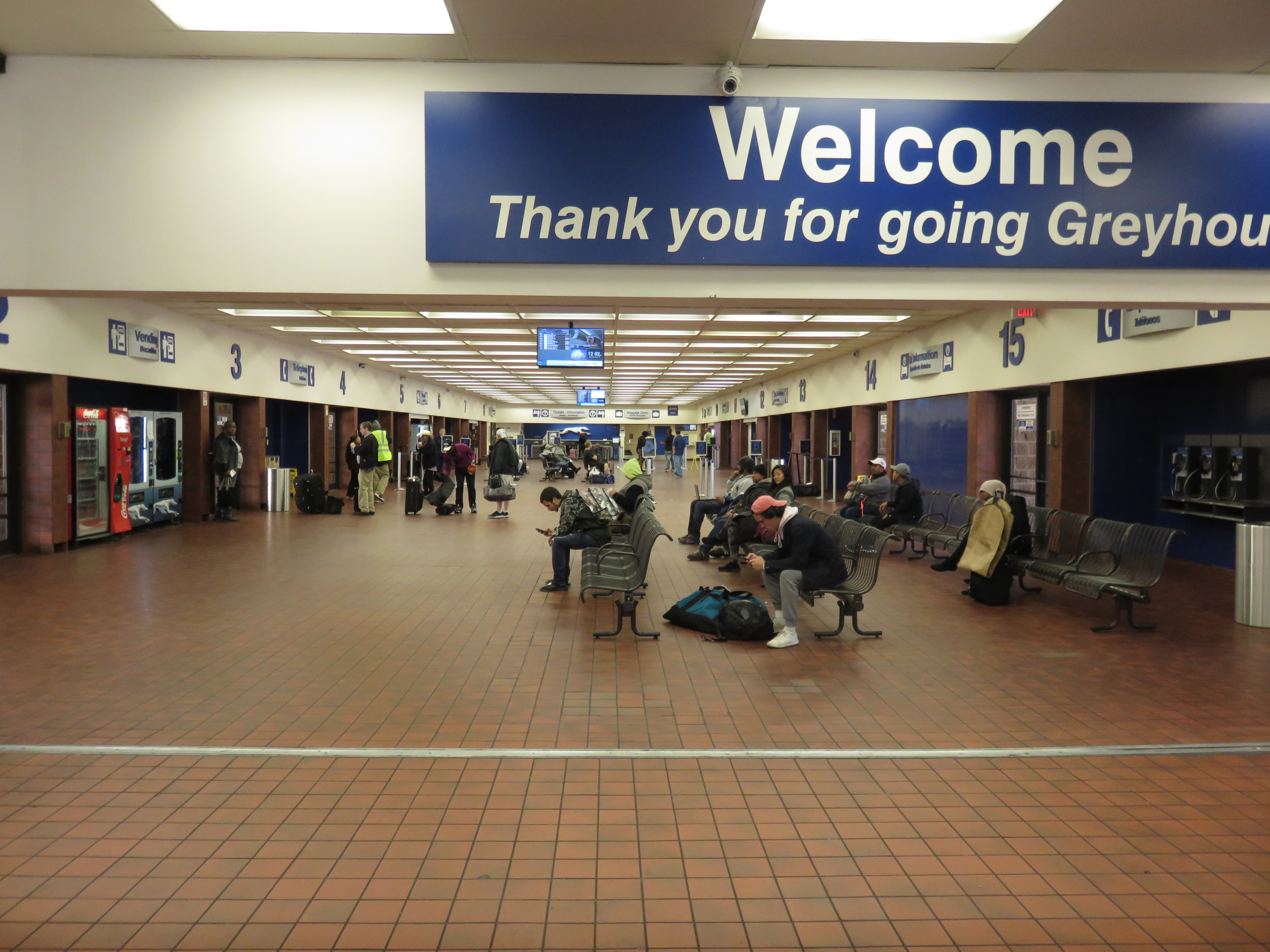
The interior of the 1977 station

Meanwhile, it was proposed that Greyhound utilize a portion of the Queensgate II Block C redevelopment site bounded by 6th, 7th, and Plum streets, and Central Avenue. Alternative sites suggested in the early 1970s were at the Cincinnati Union Terminal, where space would be made for both Greyhound and local SORTA buses, and at a former Penn Central freight depot on the east side of downtown. Ultimately, this last site was chosen at the corner of Court and Gilbert streets.

Greyhound paid Penn Central $475,000 for the property in 1976 and construction began on the $1.5 million 26,000 square foot terminal. The new station, designed by Brown & Head & Associates, and built by Universal Contracting Corp., would incorporate bright blue and white decor, red brick tile, 16 bus bays, a restaurant, cafeteria, gift shop, baggage claim, baggage lockers and other amenities.

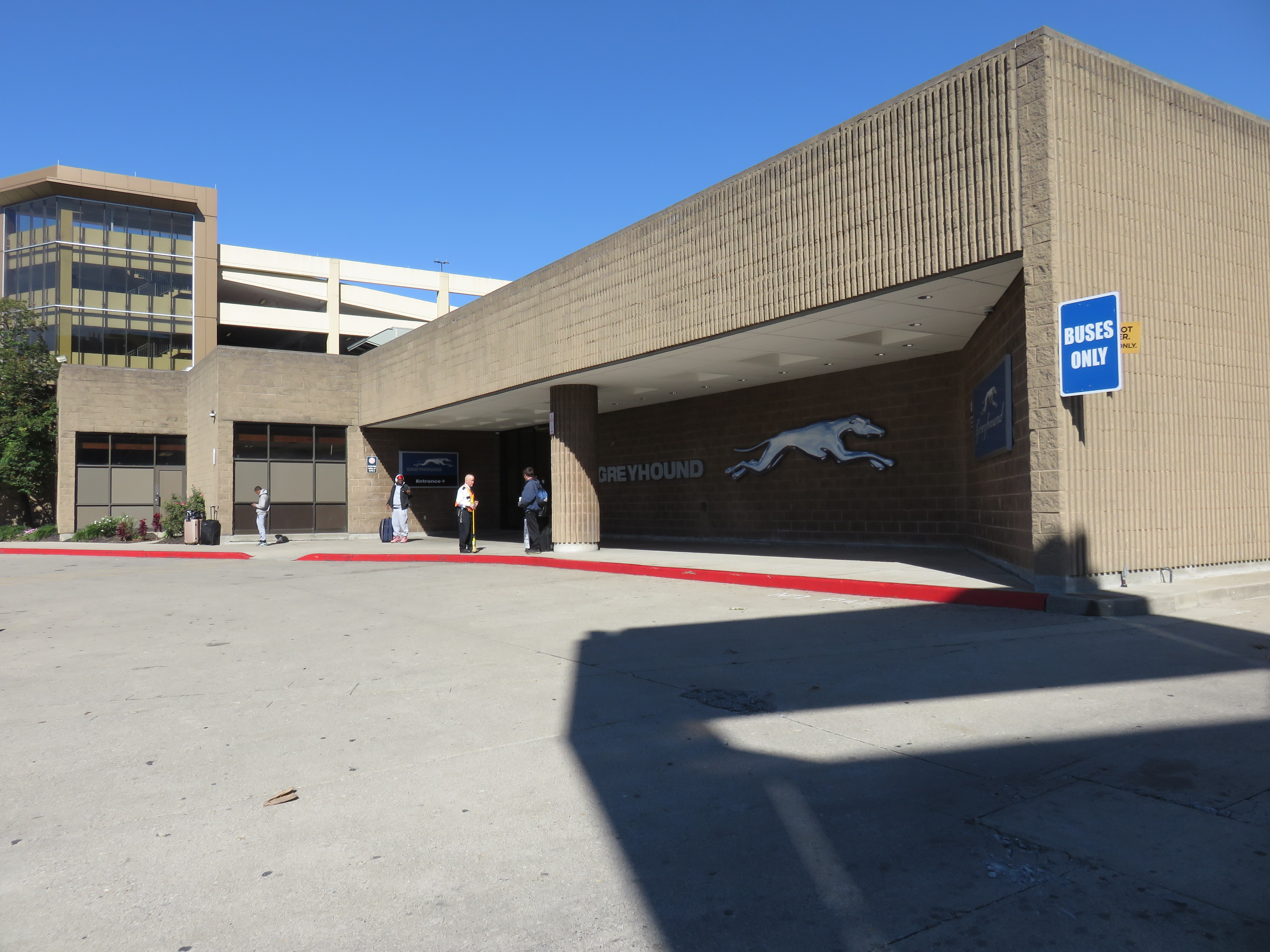
The 1977 station in 2018

On April 18, 1977, Greyhound moved out of the station at 5th and Sycamore, to a temporary facility while construction continued. Their old station was vacated to allow the construction of Central Trust Tower. The interim space was a former hardware store which had also been used by Trailways at 4th and Sycamore. Finally, on August 25, 1977, the new station opened at 12:01am. By 2008, the terminal saw 10,503 buses and 382,868 passengers annually. Forty-four buses would go to Cleveland each week, each capable of carrying 55 passengers.

=== Current station ===
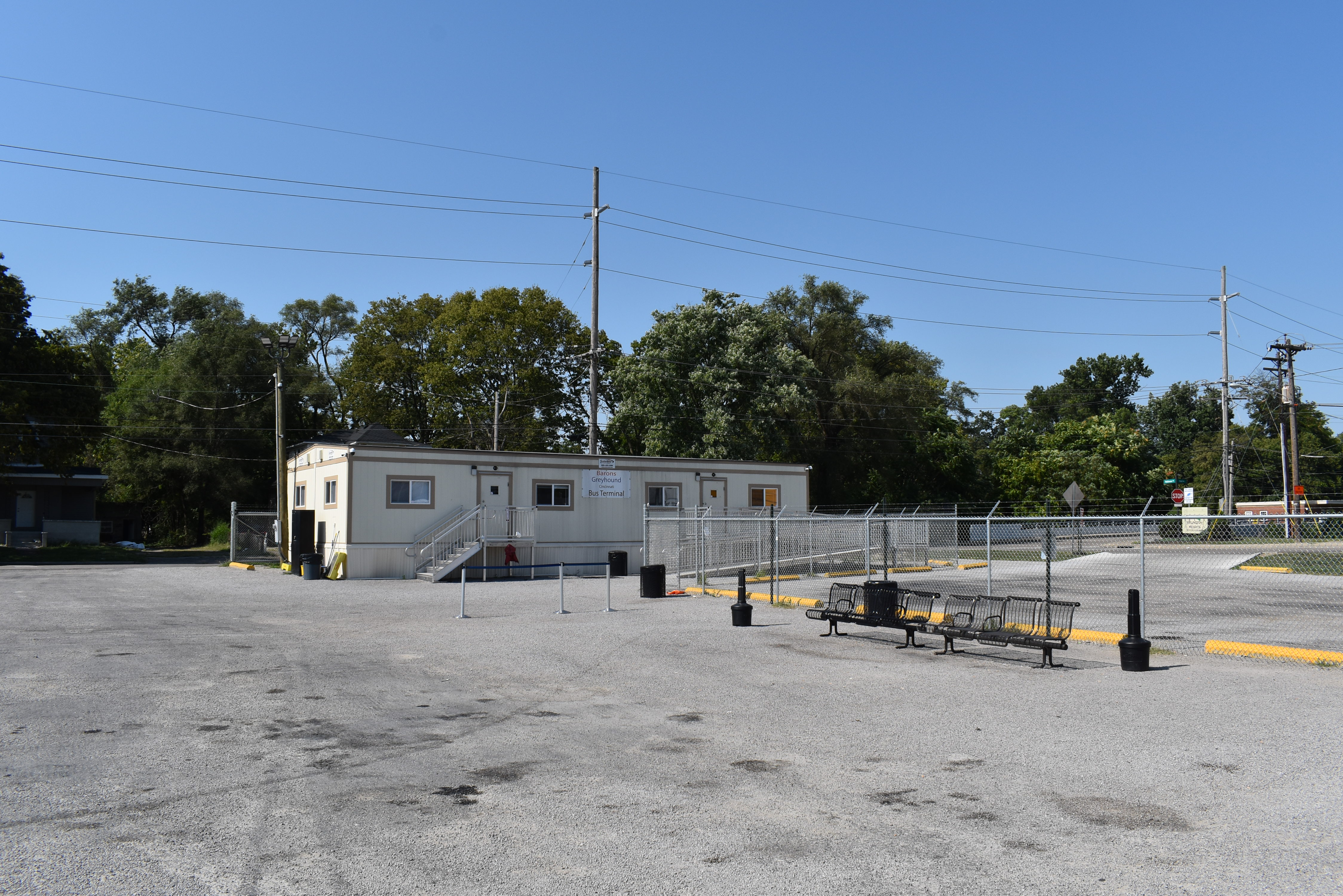
The temporary trailer in 2023

In 2021, Greyhound was sold to FlixMobility, the owner of Flixbus. However, this did not include any bus stations and later that year, the downtown Greyhound station was sold to Chavez Properties for $4.25 million with the intention of redeveloping the site. As a result, Barons Bus Lines announced in late October 2022 that it would move its operations to Arlington Heights the next month. On November 1, both Barons and Greyhound commenced services at the new Galbraith Road station, allowing the downtown station site to be redeveloped. A temporary trailer ticket office was originally constructed, until a permanent structure could be built. At the time, the facility lacked the amenities of the former station. It also is located in an area which is difficult to access without a car. This was somewhat alleviated on August 13, 2023, when the Route 43 Metro bus was extended to serve the station.

On September 1, 2023, Chavez Properties applied for a permit to demolish the 1977 station. Despite a dispute over whether the proposal for a parking lot violated city zoning, demolition was allowed to proceed.

== See also ==
- Cincinnati Union Terminal
