= Barons Bus Lines =

Intercity bus company based in Cleveland, Ohio

Barons Bus, Inc.
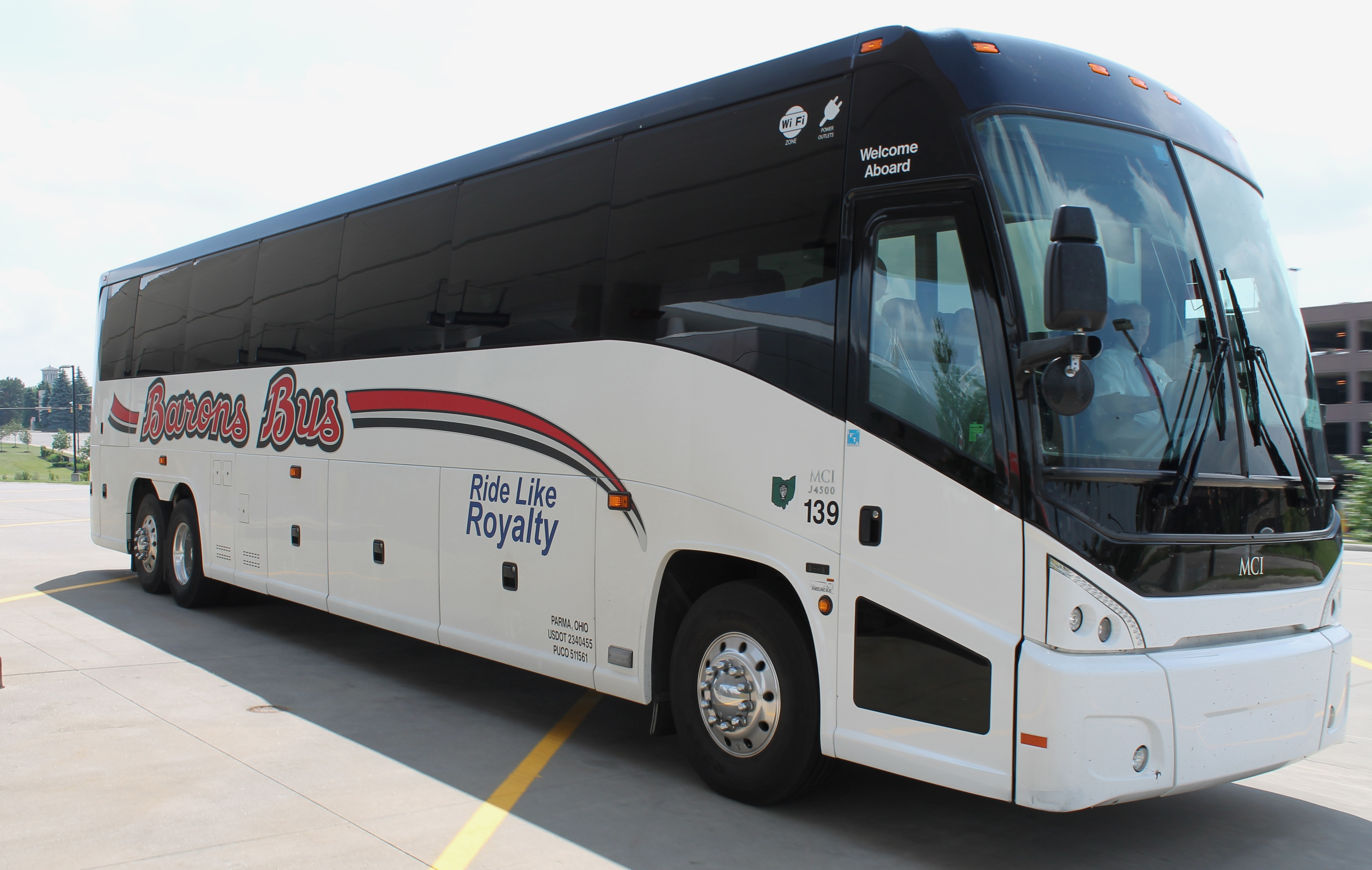
- Barons Bus coach in Akron, Ohio, 2013
- Founded: 2012
- Headquarters: Cleveland, Ohio, U.S.
- Alliance: Greyhound Lines
- Fleet: 48 buses
- Website: baronsbus.com

Barons Bus is an intercity bus company operating in the United States. It serves passengers in the U.S. states of Illinois, Indiana, Michigan, New York, North Carolina, Ohio, Pennsylvania, Virginia, and West Virginia. Barons Bus operates GoBus, a federally funded bus services that operates scheduled routes through rural parts of Ohio, and I-RIDE 79, a partnership between Barons Bus and the West Virginia Division of Public Transit. The company is based in Cleveland, Ohio.

In January 2019, Barons Bus received Metro Magazine's "Operator of the Year" award at the United Motorcoach Association Expo in Fort Lauderdale, Florida.

== History ==
Starting in 2012, the Goebel Family, former owners of Lakefront Lines (now Coach USA), opened an unassociated company under the name "Barons Bus". The company name originated from the former American Hockey League team based in Cleveland, the Cleveland Barons. In 2014, Barons Bus acquired Cleveland Southeastern Trails, a former bus company located in Bedford, Ohio. As of 2019, Barons Bus continues to expand, only operating new vehicles.

== Fleet ==
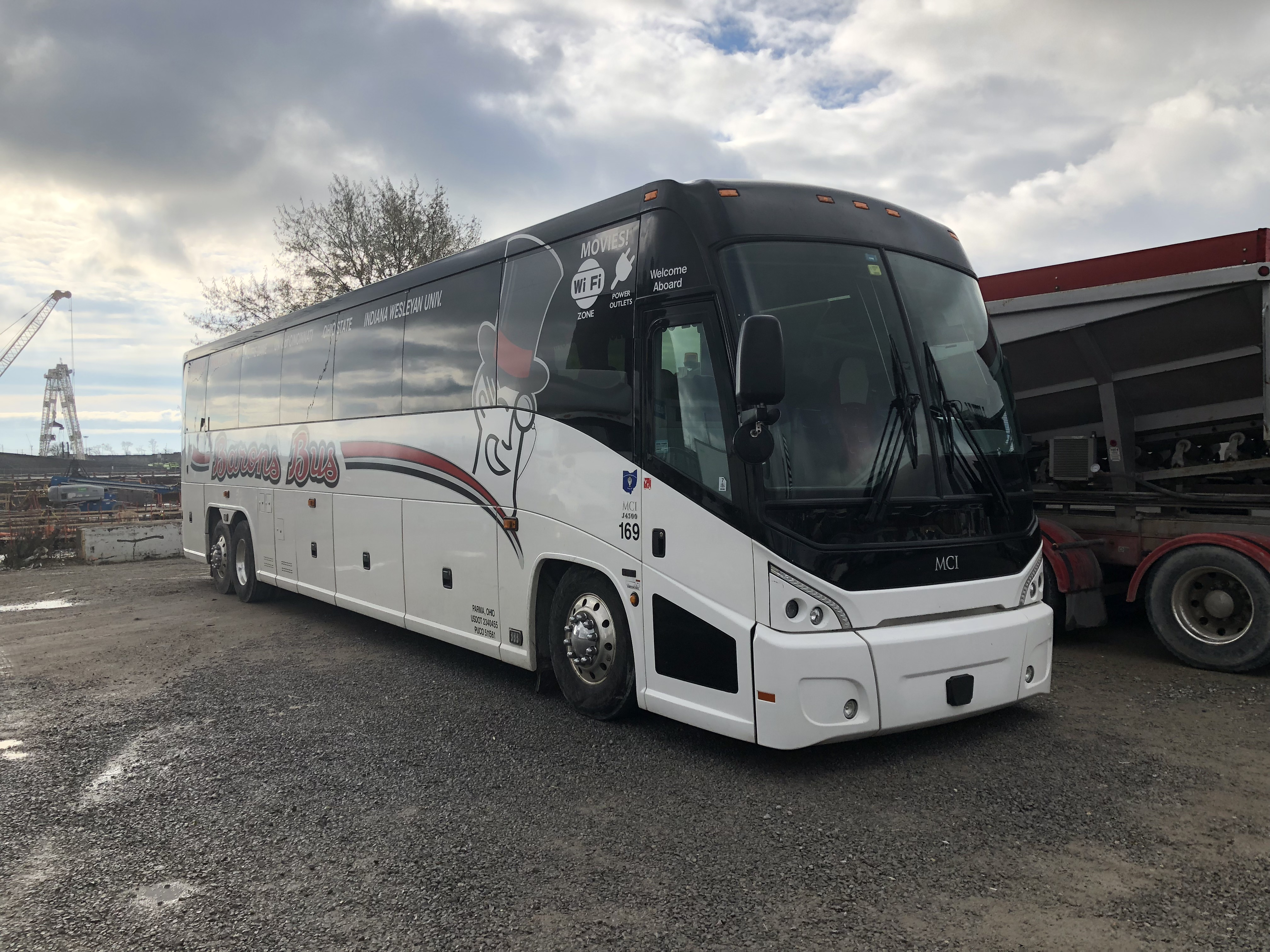
A Barons Bus MCI J4500 from Cleveland, Ohio in Toronto, Ontario - November 2018.

At company startup, Barons Bus operated with used "loaner" buses, provided by MCI, while the order for new buses was being completed. Upon acquisition of Cleveland Southeastern Trails in 2014, Barons Bus very briefly operated (4 or 5) 2008 Van Hool C2045s and (1) 2004 Prévost LeMirage XLII, before further liquidation.

For a few years, Barons Bus operated 3 different Van Hools for their line-run routes only, due to larger fuel capacity. Those buses were as follows: (1) 2016 Van Hool CX45; (2) 2017 Van Hool CX45.

As of February 2019, Barons Bus now operates a fleet of solely MCI J4500 motorcoaches. Their latest order of MCI's featured increased fuel capacity. The company's buses are typically three years old or newer.

== See also ==
- Intercity buses in the United States
