= DeJarnette Sanitarium =

Former psychiatric hospital in Staunton, Virginia, United States

Coordinates: 38.1312°N 79.0449°W

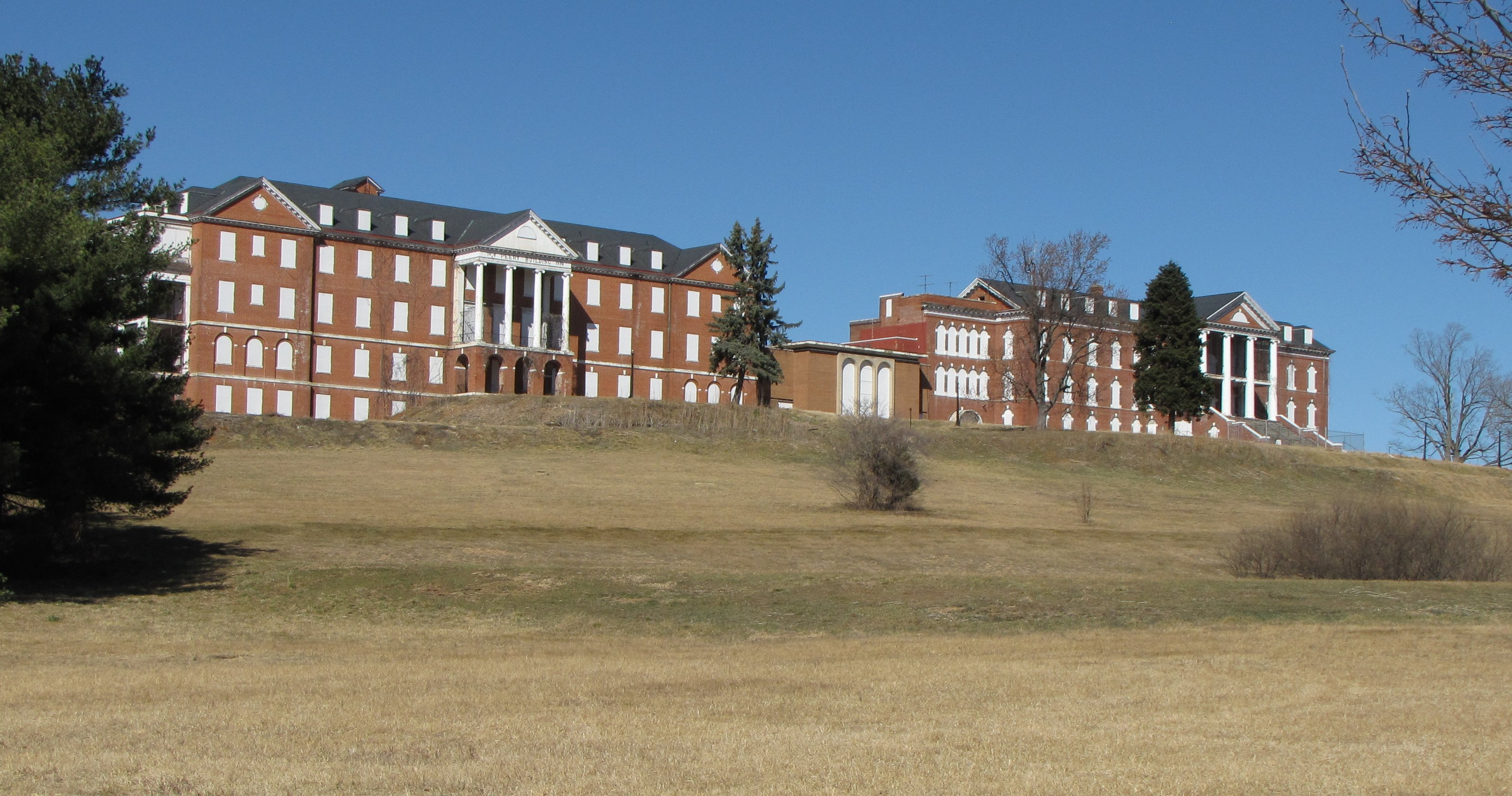
The old DeJarnette Center, seen in 2011

DeJarnette Sanitarium (also spelled DeJarnette Sanitorium), later known as the DeJarnette State Sanatorium and the DeJarnette Center for Human Development, was a psychiatric hospital in Staunton, Virginia, United States. Founded in 1932 by psychiatrist and eugenicist Joseph S. DeJarnette, it operated as a semi-private institution for mental-health treatment and became associated with the Virginia eugenics movement and state sterilization programs. The facility remained active under various names until 1996, when its services were relocated to a new site, leaving the original complex abandoned.

== History ==
The sanitarium was established in 1932 on land adjacent to Western State Hospital in Staunton, where Dr. Joseph DeJarnette had served as superintendent since 1906. He was well-known throughout Virginia for his enthusiastic and obsessive preoccupation with sterilizing people suffering from mental illness, as demonstrated by his participation in the Buck v. Bell Supreme Court Case.

Intended as a self-supporting, semi-private facility for "middle-income" people who were considered "mental defectives and drug abusers", Dejarnette Sanitarium provided mental-health care for those who could pay modest fees, in contrast to the publicly funded Western State Hospital. In 1934 the Virginia General Assembly formally renamed the institution the DeJarnette State Sanatorium. DeJarnette’s facility at Staunton embodied "the custodial ideals and therapeutic architecture of its era," linking its design and philosophy to broader state efforts to "segregate and reform" those labeled mentally unfit.

During DeJarnette’s tenure, the hospital promoted psychiatric treatments consistent with early-twentieth-century institutional practice, including occupational therapy and custodial confinement. Its operations reflected contemporary eugenic attitudes toward mental illness, disability, and heredity.

After DeJarnette’s retirement in 1943, the facility continued under state oversight. In 1975 the Commonwealth of Virginia consolidated its mental-health facilities, and the site became part of the state system as the DeJarnette Center for Human Development. The institution later specialized in adolescent psychiatric care. In 1996, its operations were moved to a new building nearby, forming the Commonwealth Center for Children and Adolescents, and the original 1930s structure was closed.

== Architecture ==
The original sanitarium complex was designed in the Georgian-Revival style, with red-brick façades, symmetrical wings, and classical porticos. The plan reflected early-twentieth-century theories of moral treatment and environmental therapy, emphasizing orderly architecture and landscaped grounds to promote calm among patients.

The interior included wards for both male and female patients, administrative offices, treatment rooms, and communal spaces intended to resemble a "rest home" rather than an asylum. Despite this façade, later accounts emphasize overcrowding, custodial confinement, and inhumane medical experiments during its operation.

== Eugenics and sterilization practices ==
DeJarnette was a prominent advocate of eugenics and compulsory sterilization. As superintendent of Western State Hospital and founder of the sanitarium, he supported the Virginia Sterilization Act of 1924, which authorized involuntary sterilization of patients deemed "unfit" to reproduce. He argued that hereditary mental defects endangered society and publicly praised Nazi Germany’s sterilization policies in the 1930s.

When the Nazis intensified their sterilization program by making it more far-reaching, Dejarnette composed a letter to the government of Virginia, arguing therein that "the state needed to extend the sterilization law to more closely resemble the comprehensive German law." American eugenicists like Dejarnette were envious of the Nazi eugenics efforts, since the Germans had already sterilized in excess of four-hundred thousand people. To this end, he stated that "the Germans are beating us at our own game and are more progressive than we are." Despite such observations, historian Stefan Kühl claims the sterilization and racial hygiene programs occurring earlier in the United States provided a "model" for Nazi Germany well into the late 1930s. Historians can now trace ideological connections between American eugenics policy and some of the "most unambiguously criminal Nazi programs" carried out across Europe during the era of the Second World War.

Patients committed to Western State and its affiliated institutions, including DeJarnette Sanitarium, were subjected to sterilization under auspices of these 1920s laws until the 1970s. It was not until 2001 that the Virginia General Assembly issued a formal resolution expressing "profound regret" for the state’s participation in eugenics and the suffering caused to those sterilized without consent.

== Decline and closure ==
By the late twentieth century, public mental-health policy in the United States shifted toward community-based treatment and deinstitutionalization. The DeJarnette facility’s aging infrastructure and negative associations with its eugenic past led to plans for relocation. In 1996 the hospital moved into a modern complex, and the original buildings were abandoned.

The derelict structures, still standing near the former Western State campus in Staunton, have become the focus of urban-exploration and "haunted asylum" narratives. Despite intermittent redevelopment proposals, the site remains closed to the public, and local authorities have imposed anti-trespassing measures to prevent entry.

== Legacy ==
The DeJarnette Sanitarium is frequently cited in discussions of the American eugenics movement and its ethical failures. Scholars identify it as a case study in how medical authority, class distinctions, and pseudoscientific theories of heredity shaped institutional psychiatry in the United States.

Public memory of the institution reflects both fascination with abandoned asylums and an evolving reckoning with eugenics in Virginia’s history. The building’s architecture and preservation status have attracted heritage and mental-health historians examining the intersection of architecture, medicine, and social policy.

== See also ==
- Western State Hospital (Virginia)
- Eugenics in the United States
- Buck v. Bell
- History of psychiatric institutions
- Deinstitutionalization

== Bibliography ==
- Allen, Garland E. (2008). "The Ideology of Elimination: American and German Eugenics, 1900–1945". In Francis R. Nicosia; Jonathan Heuner (eds.). Medicine and Medical Ethics in Nazi Germany: Origins, Practices, Legacies. New York and Oxford: Berghahn Books. pp. 13–39. ISBN 978-1-57181-386-2.
- Brocato, Amanda D. (January 2008). "The Campaign for Eugenics in Virginia: The Influence of Dr. J.S. DeJarnette". Augusta Historical Bulletin. 44 (1): 105–117. doi:10.14765/zzf.dok-1973.
- Dorr, Gregory Michael (2008). Segregation's Science: Eugenics and Society in Virginia. Charlottesville: University of Virginia Press. ISBN 978-0-81393-034-3.
- Dorr, Gregory Michael (2020). "DeJarnette, Joseph S. (1866–1957)". Encyclopedia Virginia. Virginia Humanities.
- Gordon, Bonnie (2018). "On Listening". In Claudrena N. Harold; Louis P. Nelson (eds.). Charlottesville 2017: The Legacy of Race and Inequity. Charlottesville: University of Virginia Press. ISBN 978-0-81394-190-5.
- Kevles, Daniel J. (1986). In the Name of Eugenics: Genetics and the Uses of Human Heredity. New York: Knopf. OCLC 5156113426.
- Kühl, Stefan (2002). The Nazi Connection: Eugenics, American Racism, and German National Socialism. Oxford and New York: Oxford University Press. ISBN 0-19-508260-5.
- Mad in America (2018). "The DeJarnette Sanitarium". Mad in America.
- Norris, Caroline (2017). "A History of Madness: Four Venerable Virginia Lunatic Asylums". Virginia Magazine of History and Biography. 125 (2): 138–182. ISSN 0042-6636.
- Powers, Kathy (2023). "Western State Hospital and the DeJarnette Center, Staunton VA". Historic Asylums UMW.
- RVA Ghosts (2022). "The DeJarnette Sanitarium". RVA Ghosts.
- Treadway, Chester (2021). "The Abandoned DeJarnette Sanitarium". Atlas Obscura.
- Whitehouse, Olivia (February 8, 2025). "Anti-trespassing measures taken at abandoned DeJarnette Sanitorium". WHSV-TV3 News.
- Whitman, James Q. (2017). Hitler's American Model: The United States and the Making of Nazi Race Law. Princeton and Oxford: Princeton University Press. ISBN 978-0-69117-242-2.

=== Further reading ===
- "The DeJarnette Sanitarium Records, 1932–1996 (Accession 50989)". Library of Virginia EAD Finding Aid.
