= John Quincy Adams Nadenbousch =

American politician and businessman

- Born: October 31, 1824; Berkeley County, Virginia
- Died: September 13, 1892 (aged 67); Martinsburg, West Virginia
- Spouse: Hester Jane Miller

John Quincy Adams Nadenbousch (31 October 1824 – 13 September 1892) was a businessman, Confederate officer during the American Civil War and local politician in Martinsburg, West Virginia.

== Early life ==
Born in Berkeley County, Virginia (later West Virginia) outside Martinsburg to Frederick Nadenbousch. His siblings included Susan E Seibert and Moses C. Nadenbousch.

In 1848, he married Hester Jane Miller. Early in life he had worked as a carpenter and proprietor of a Martinsburg lumber yard, and, by 1852, expanded his business affairs with the purchase of the Beeson flour mill, and soon established a distillery on the north side of Tuscarora Creek. The distillery he built in Martinsburg in 1857 was destroyed during the Civil War but was rebuilt in 1863 and became the Hannis Distilling Company.

== Militia service and Harper’s Ferry ==
Nadenbousch was instrumental in forming the Berkeley Border Guards, a pre-Civil War local militia unit. When the federal armory at Harpers Ferry was attacked by John Brown, on October 16, 1859, Nadenbousch's company was one of the first to respond.

== American Civil War ==
Following Virginia's secession, Nadenbousch's company was called into service and became Company D of the 2nd Virginia Infantry Regiment, which was part of the Stonewall Brigade under General Thomas J. "Stonewall" Jackson, and first engaged at the First Battle of Manassas. Following the battle, Nadenbousch personally brought home the bodies of three of his men, and buried them in the Old Norbourne Cemetery, in Martinsburg. Eventually becoming Colonel and commander of the regiment, Nadenbousch was twice wounded; first at the Second Manassas, in August, 1862, and, less than a year later, at the Battle of Chancellorsville, in May, 1863. On account of impaired health, and at his own request, Nadenbousch was relieved later that summer, from duty in the field, and assigned to the command of the post at Staunton, Virginia. He later resigned on April 12, 1864, and began his return to civilian affairs before the war concluded. In his obituary, Nadenbousch was noted for his courage, ability, and coolness; and said to be a favorite of General Jackson.

On May 25, 1863, Nadenbousch purchased the American Hotel in Staunton, Virginia at an auction from Samuel B. Brown and Aaron S. Lara. When the Union Army under David Hunter occupied Staunton in June 1864, Nadenbousch befriended one of Hunter's officers, David Hunter Strother, who agreed to spare the American Hotel and its adjoining warehouse when the Army destroyed the nearby train depots. Nadenbousch's loyalty to the Confederacy may have shifted and when Hunter left Staunton on June 10, he gave Nadenbousch a pass to "return home as a loyal citizen of the United States."

== Postwar businessman, citizen and politician ==
After the war, Nadenbousch continued work as a miller and distiller in Berkeley County, with interests in the Nadenbousch & Roush, at Union Mills and at Hannisville Mills (as a subsidiary to the Hannis Distilling Company of Philadelphia, Pennsylvania).

In 1876, Nagenbousch purchased the Martinsburg lot, on which the United States Hotel had stood. He then became a hotelier, constructing the Grand Central Hotel. It opened in December 1877, but Nagenbousch only operated it for about one year before renting it out to J. N. Woodward (formerly proprietor of Staunton's American Hotel) for several years after 1878. By 1881, he was said to be superintendent of one of the largest distilleries in the country. Nadenbousch also served as mayor, councilman, and trustee of Martinsburg. Beginning in 1870, he became Marshall of the Martinsburg Fire Company, and he also maintained membership in the Tuscarora Lodge of the Independent Order of Odd Fellow, and was an officer of the Berkeley County Agricultural and Mechanical Association.

== Personal life ==
He had at least one son, J. F. Nadenbousch, who died on June 1, 1884.

He died September 13, 1892, of paralysis, and was buried in Old Norbourne Cemetery, in Martinsburg.

A veterans organization in martinsburg was named the J. Q. A. Nadenbousch Camp of ex-Confederate veterans after him.
