= Virginia Hotel =

Coordinates: 38°8′56.3″N 79°4′16.2″W

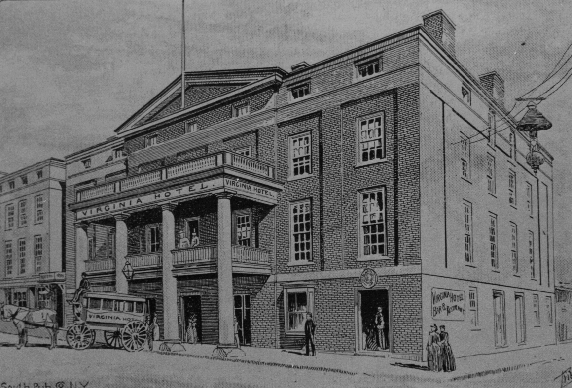
Artist's rendering of the Virginia Hotel, circa 1890. From a promotional book titled "Staunton, Virginia: Past, Present and Future".

The Virginia Hotel was built in 1847 in Staunton, Virginia, and quickly became known as one of the finest hostelries in the commonwealth. Built on the site of the old Washington Tavern, the northeast corner of Greenville Avenue at New Street, the Virginia Hotel gained fame during the American Civil War as the headquarters of Stonewall Jackson, and served, alternately, as a hospital for Confederate soldiers and as headquarters for conquering Union Gen. David Hunter. It also served as a meeting point for several U.S. Presidents.

After the war, the Virginia Hotel thrived under a succession of owners until, in the late 19th century, it was refurbished and renamed the New Virginia. In 1926, the Virginia's owner—Alexander T. Moore—announced he would demolish the historic structure to make way for a new hotel, which would adjoin the newer Stonewall Jackson Hotel (now the Hotel 24 South), of which he was also owner. Moore demolished the Virginia Hotel in October 1930, but the new hotel was never built due to financial constraints caused by the Great Depression. The lot sat empty for years, was used to house a gas station in the 1950s, and then built upon by the city of Staunton for a parking garage.
