= 2nd Virginia Infantry Regiment =

Confederate States Army unit

- Flag of Virginia, 1861
- Active: May 1861 – Spring 1865
- Disbanded: 1865
- Country: Confederate States of America
- Allegiance: Virginia
- Branch: Confederate States Army
- Type: Regiment
- Role: Infantry
- Engagements: American Civil War: First Battle of Bull Run; Battle of Kernstown I; Battle of Cross Keys; Battle of Port Republic; Battle of Gaines Mill; Second Battle of Bull Run; Battle of Fredericksburg; Battle of Gettysburg

Commanders
- Notable commanders: Colonel J.Q.A. Nadenbousch

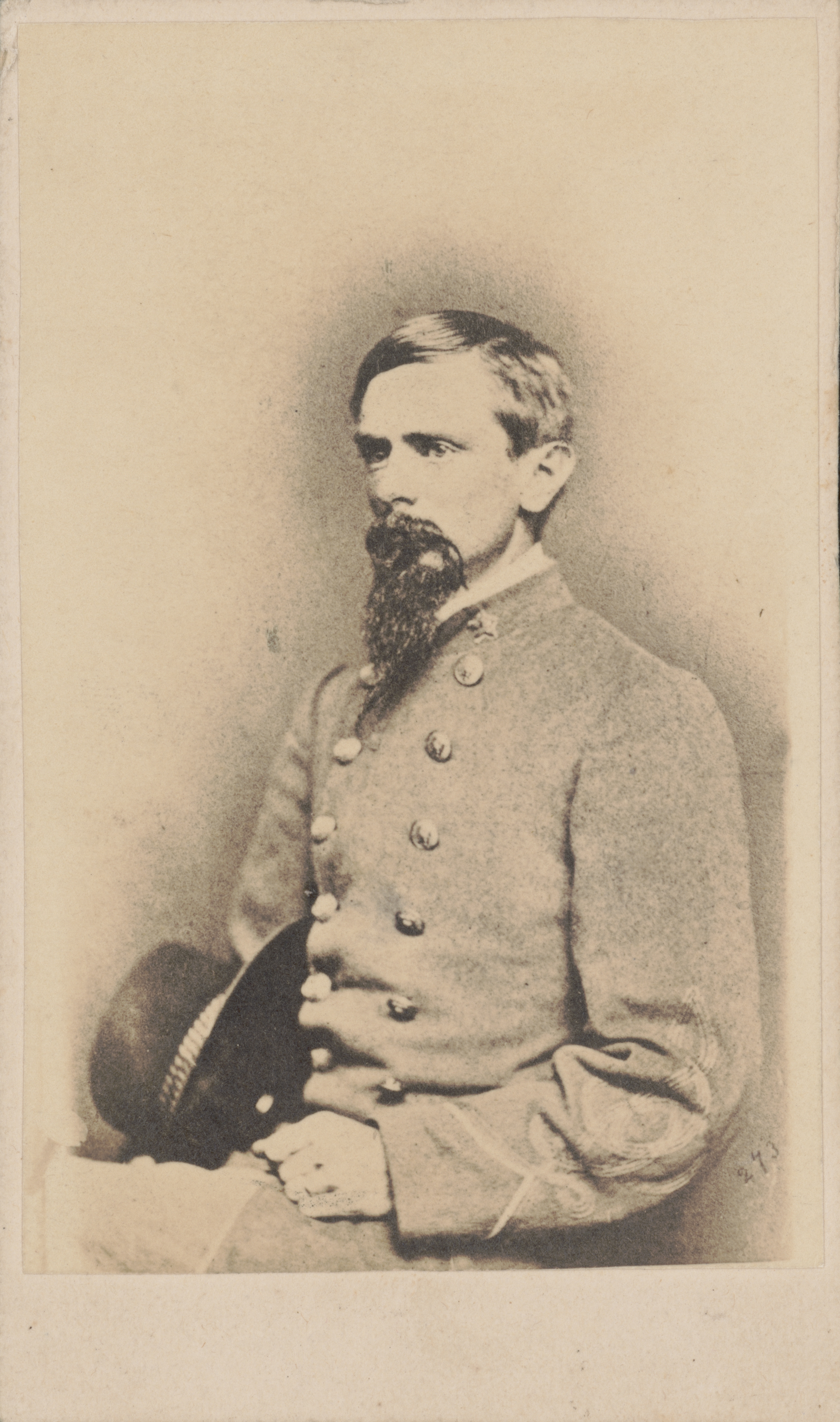
Major Bernard Likens Wolff of Co. D, 2nd Virginia Infantry

The 2nd Virginia Infantry Regiment was an infantry regiment raised in today's western Virginia and what became West Virginia during the American Civil War for service in the Confederate States Army. It would combine with the 4th, 5th, 27th, and 33rd Virginia infantry regiments and the Rockbridge Artillery Battery and fight as part of what became known as the Stonewall Brigade, mostly with the Army of Northern Virginia.

== Units ==
Sortable table
Company	Nickname	Recruited at	First Commanding Officer
A	Jefferson Guards	Jefferson County	John W. Rowan
B	Hamtramck Guards	Shepherdstown, Jefferson County	Vincent Moore Butler
C	Nelson Rifles	Millwood, Clarke County	William N. Nelson
D	Berkeley Border Guards	Martinsburg, Berkeley County	John Q.A. Nadenbousch
E	Hedgesville Blues	Hedgesville, Berkeley County	Raleigh T. Colston
F	Winchester Riflemen	Winchester, Frederick County	William L. Clark, Jr
G	Botts Greys	Charles Town, Jefferson County	Lawson Botts
H	Letcher Riflemen	Duffields, Jefferson County	James H.L. Hunter
I	Clarke Rifles	Berryville, Clarke County	Strother H. Bowen
K	Floyd Guards	Harpers Ferry, Jefferson County	George W. Chambers

== Campaigns ==
Private Samuel T. Cowley of Co. A, 2nd Virginia Infantry Regiment

The 2nd Virginia was assembled at Charles Town on April 18, 1861, then moved (gathering further units en route) to Harper's Ferry to seize the armory. Its ten companies were from the counties of Clarke, Frederick, Jefferson, and Berkeley.

As the volunteer units approached the armory, they heard a roar and saw a flash as Lt. Roger Jones and his U.S. army regulars blew up the arsenal at 10p.m. Capt. John Rowan and the Jefferson Guards led the volunteers into Harpers Ferry three hours later, meeting no opposition and noticing that while 15,000 weapons had been destroyed, townspeople had saved the buildings and weapon-producing machinery inside. That machinery was soon shipped to the Tredegar Iron Works in Richmond, Virginia for Confederate use.

VMI professor Thomas Jonathan Jackson arrived on Monday, April 29 and organized the volunteer craftsmen, laborers and farmers of the ten drilled companies into regiments, revolutionizing their notions of war in a short time. Col. Allen and Lt. Col. Francis Lackland had both graduated in the VMI class of 1849. Captains John W. Rowan (of the Jefferson Guards of Charles Town), Vincent Moore Butler (of the Hamtramck Guards of Shepherdstown), William N. Nelson (of the Nelson Rifles of Millwood) and George W. Chambers (of the Floyd Guards raised in Harpers Ferry) had military experience in Mexico. Throughout May (as the units were mustered officially into Virginia state service mid-month), Jackson assiduously drilled the men, 12 hours each day; they learned complex maneuvers and began jelling into a single unit.

The unit became part of the Army of the Shenandoah and evacuated Harpers Ferry on June 14, 1861, upon orders of General Joseph E. Johnston, who considered the location untenable. Troops burned the Shepherdstown bridge (private Henry Kyd Douglas realizing that his father was a stockholder in the property being destroyed) and joined Johnston's army four miles south of Charles Town. They would then change camp seven times in 17 days. Their first skirmish was on July 2, 1861, and involved no casualties, but lost the company's tents at what became known as the Battle of Hoke's Run or Falling Water. The 2nd Virginia was accepted into Confederate service in mid-July, then ordered on July 18 to Manassas Junction (traveling by railroad) to reinforce General P. G. T. Beauregard's Army of the Potomac. It gained its nickname at what became the First Battle of Manassas on July 21, 1861. In the previous months, the unit was sometimes known as "Virginia's First Brigade", which caused confusion as the 1st Virginia Infantry was established at Richmond in May 1861 and composed of regular Virginia troops. As part of the Stonewall Brigade, the 2nd Virginia fought under Generals T.J. Jackson, R.B. Garnett, Winder, Paxton, J.A. Walker, and W. Terry.

The 2nd Virginia fought at many famous battles throughout the conflict. In addition to First Manassas, it fought at Second Manassas (after First Kernstown and Jackson's Valley Campaign and with the Army of Northern Virginia from the Seven Days' Battles to Cold Harbor). It reported 90 casualties at First Kernstown, 25 at Cross Keys and Port Republic, 27 at Gaines' Mill, and 77 at Second Manassas. However, during part of the Maryland Campaign of 1863, it was detached to Martinsburg as provost guards. The regiment lost 2 killed and 19 wounded at Fredericksburg, had 8 killed and 58 wounded at Chancellorsville, and had about eight percent of the 333 men engaged at Gettysburg disabled. Later, the unit was involved in Jubal Early's operations in the Shenandoah Valley and finally surrendered at the end at Appomattox Court House on April 9, 1865, with 9 officers and 62 men. A notable death from the Regiment was that of Private John Wesley Culp, who was killed on his uncle's farm in Gettysburg (hence "Culp's Hill").

== Significant members ==
Its field officers were Colonels James W. Allen (who died at the Battle of Cold Harbor), Lawson Botts (of the Botts Greys, initially raised at Charles Town as Company G, killed in skirmishes shortly before Second Manassas), and John Q.A. Nadenbousch (initially of Company D, the Berkeley Border Guards, raised at Martinsburg); Lieutenant Colonels Francis Lackland (a VMI graduate of the same 1849 VMI class as Col. Allen, who would be hospitalized with pneumonia and die in September 1861); Raleigh T. Colston (initially of Company E, the Hedgesville Blues, and who became the unit's colonel after Nadenbousch was forced to retire following complications after the Battle of Gettysburg and who died at the Battle of Mine Run in November 1864), and William W. Randolph; and Majors Francis B. Jones, Edwin L. Moore, and Charles H. Stewart.

Dr. Hunter McGuire, who eventually would become the Second Corps' Chief Surgeon (and amputated Stonewall Jackson's arm after Chancellorsville and the leg of Isaac Trimble after Gettysburg), initially enlisted as a private in Company F. He became active with the Medical Society of Virginia and a president of the American Medical Association, and later contributed to the First Geneva Convention.

== See also ==
- Company D, 2nd Virginia Infantry
- List of Virginia Civil War units
- List of West Virginia Civil War Confederate units
