= Company D, 2nd Virginia Infantry =

Company D, 2nd Virginia Infantry, locally designated the Berkeley Border Guards, was an antebellum Virginia militia company and then a company of the 2nd Virginia Infantry, a Confederate infantry unit during the American Civil War.

This pre-war militia unit was present at the execution of John Brown, a famous abolitionist leader who, in 1859, led a raid on the United States Arsenal at Harpers Ferry, Virginia (now West Virginia). The unit's original leader was Captain John Quincy Adams Nadenbousch. They were stationed around Martinsburg, in what is now West Virginia.

During the Civil War, the company was a part of the original "Stonewall Brigade," commanded by General Thomas J. Jackson of Lexington, Virginia, originally a native of Clarksburg, Virginia (now West Virginia), and Jackson's Mill, near present-day Weston, West Virginia.

== Battles of Company D ==
- First Manassas
- Kernstown
- First Winchester
- Port Republic
- Gaines' Mill
- Malvern Hill
- Second Manassas
- Fredericksburg
- Chancellorsville
- Salem Church
- Second Winchester (The 2nd lost its battle flag at this battle)
- Gettysburg
- Payne's Farm
- Spotsylvania Court House
- Cedar Creek

== Reenactment ==
The unit is now part of a Civil War Reenacting unit out of Clarksburg, West Virginia. The group is led by Captain Chris Wright of Clarksburg. The unit does reenactments throughout West Virginia, Virginia, Pennsylvania, and Ohio. They have participated reenactments of such battles as The Battle of Philippi, Monocacy, Cedar Creek, and First Manassas. The group has also done living histories at Harpers Ferry and Gettysburg. The group is currently trying to gain entrance in the Antietam National Battlefield and other places. The unit currently belongs to the 10th Battalion ANV.

== See also ==
- List of Virginia Civil War units
