= Richmond Examiner =

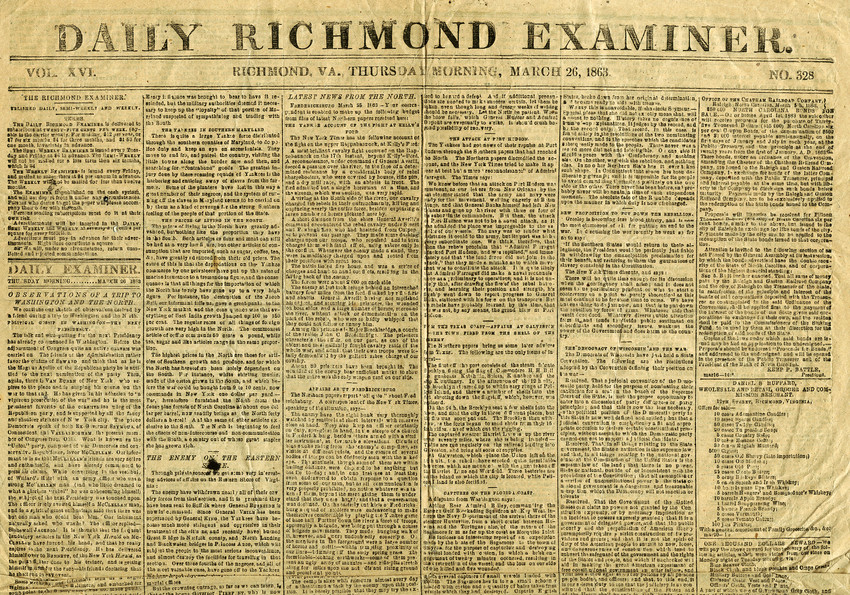
The Daily Richmond Examiner, March 26, 1863

The Richmond Examiner, a newspaper which was published before and during the American Civil War under the masthead of Daily Richmond Examiner, was one of the newspapers published in the Confederate capital of Richmond. Its editors viewed strong executive leadership as a threat to the liberties of its subscription readership. The paper published staunch and increasingly vitriolic opposition to the leadership and policies of Confederate President Jefferson Davis. Historians often consult the pages of the Examiner for insights into the growing problems faced by the Davis administration and the South as they faced the increasing prospect of defeat in the Civil War.

== History ==
The Examiner was first published as the Richmond Weekly Examiner. The newspaper published a weekly edition from 1848 until about 1863. As Richmond grew, demand for the paper increased and the Examiner began to publish a semi-weekly edition, the Richmond Semi-Weekly Examiner, in 1849. The Examiner began to publish a daily edition in 1861. At the time of Virginia's secession in April, Richmond editors had commenced the publication of four separate, independent daily newspapers. All of the papers supported the Confederate cause, especially as the would-be nation had selected Richmond as its new federal capital. However, the Examiner's executive editor, John Moncure Daniel, personally disliked President Jefferson Davis, and Daniel was not characterized by verbal self-restraint. In the words of the Encyclopedia Virginia, "Daniel was known for his mordant, combative personality and rapier-like pen."

=== American Civil War ===
As Davis promoted some of his Cabinet members and demoted others, and made similar reshuffles and changes to the Confederacy's team of military field commanders, Editor Daniel and his staff defended many of the men who had been held back by the Davis Administration. In sharp contrast to this supportive attitude towards those who had been lateraled or dismissed, the Examiner criticized men who had remained on Davis's team. These critiques took on greater and greater bitterness over time. In August 1864 the daily paper attacked the Treasurer of the Confederate States of America, Edward C. Elmore. The Southern treasury was virtually empty, and the Examiner insinuated that Treasurer Elmore had embezzled the Southern States' tiny remaining stock of hard money in order to enjoy a gambling spree. The enraged treasurer challenged Daniel to a duel, and wounded the crusading editor with a pistol shot.

On the military side, the Examiner championed the tactical skills of General Joseph E. Johnston, an officer disliked by President Davis. After Davis relieved Johnston from command over the Army of Tennessee in July 1864, the Examiner began to speak with despondency of the future prospects facing the Confederate States of America. Its editorial position may have caused further problems of morale in a capital city that would soon be hungry and besieged by the Union armies. The daily paper was itself hit by the siege of Richmond, and was unable to continue to publish as a broadsheet with a masthead. The paper struggled on in a half-sheet format without a masthead until the fall of Richmond and the Confederacy in April 1865.

=== Reconstruction ===
The Daily Richmond Examiner tried to continue to publish under Federal occupation, but was unable to do so. The newspaper ceased publication in July 1867, when it merged into the Richmond Enquirer. The Richmond Enquirer & Examiner was published from July 15, 1867 to December 31, 1869, when the newspaper changed its name back to simply Richmond Enquirer. The Library of Virginia has microfilm copies of the Examiner's weekly, semi-weekly, and daily editions for all of the years noted above, and has paper copies of the Semi-Weekly Examiner for the period of 1849–1863. The University of Virginia Library has copies from January 1861 through December 1865.
