= John N. Hendren =

American lawyer

John N. Hendren (August 3, 1822 – March 5, 1898) was a Virginia attorney and judge who served as the second Treasurer of the Confederate States of America, serving during the last year of the American Civil War.

Hendren was born in Staunton, Virginia. He was the nephew of locally prominent Presbyterian minister John Hendren. He attended The College of William & Mary, studied law, passed his bar exam, and established a prosperous legal practice in Staunton. He married, raised a family, and built a large mansion, "Selma."

Secretary of the Treasury Christopher Memminger resigned his post on July 18, 1864, and was replaced by fellow South Carolinian George Trenholm. However, Edward C. Elmore initially stayed on as Treasurer under Trenholm, but resigned in the autumn. Shortly afterward, Hendren posted his bond on October 10, 1864, and assumed the role of Treasurer. He stayed in his post until the fall of the Confederacy in April 1865.

Following the war, Hendren returned to Staunton and was a judge for Augusta County, Virginia.

== Notes ==
Preceded by Edward C. Elmore	Confederate States Treasurer; 1861–1864	Succeeded by none
