= John Moncure Daniel =

American diplomat and newspaper editor

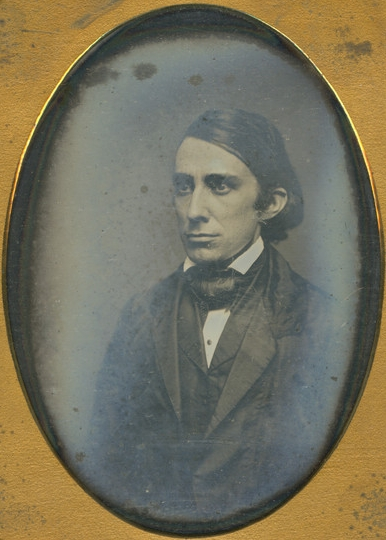
Daguerreotype portrait of John Moncure Daniel, by Jesse H. Whitehurst, c1861

John Moncure Daniel (October 24, 1825 – March 30, 1865) was the US minister to the Kingdom of Sardinia in 1854-1861. However, he is best known for his role as the executive editor of the Richmond Examiner, one of the chief newspapers of the Confederate States of America. Editorials written by Daniel and his editorial board have served as source materials for historians of the American Civil War.

== Early life ==
Daniel was born in Stafford County, Virginia, on October 24, 1825. He was the son of physician Dr. John M. Daniel and Eliza Mitchell Daniel. The young John discovered a talent for journalism and moved south within his native state to Richmond, Virginia. In 1847, he became one of the first writers for a weekly paper, the Richmond Examiner. Soon, he became a leading writer for the paper. Then, as its editor, he became a patron of Edgar Allan Poe and published several of Poe's poems.

== Diplomat ==
Daniel, as an editor aligned with the Democratic Party, was appointed in 1853 by the administration of President Franklin Pierce as the United States diplomat to the Kingdom of Sardinia. In 1853, Sardinia was a nation within Italy with its capital at Turin. Daniel was titled the chargé d'affaires for the first year of his time in Turin; in 1854, his title was advanced to minister. He was thus present in Italy during the Second Italian War of Independence, when Italian patriots united to secede from the Austrian Empire and create a new country of their own. For Daniel, this was an inspiring sight. His diplomatic stint ended in January 1861.

== Civil War editor ==
Back home in Richmond, Daniel re-established his editorial control over the Richmond Examiner, which had become a daily periodical. He and many other leading white citizens of Richmond were strong supporters of Southern secession from the United States, and their enthusiasm grew when the new Confederate States of America (CSA) chose Richmond as the fledgling nation's capital city. Daniel looked forward to his paper becoming a leading organ of the new slaveholding republic.

To Daniel's dismay, however, the young country had selected Jefferson Davis as its president. Daniel's editorials were less than enthusiastic about Davis from almost the start of his challenged presidency and were even more hostile as the war continued. The Davis administration made various changes to its cabinet and to its ranks of senior generals who were granted field commands, and to the Examiner, every Confederate policy change was wrong and every personnel shift was misguided. John Daniel's passionate advocacy has helped maintain the historical status and legacy of Confederate generals who might otherwise not have been remembered so well, such as Joseph E. Johnston.

Daniel's status and hostility to the administration grew to the point that he came to be seen by some as an informal leader of the Confederate opposition. In 1864, after at least one editorial in the Examiner had made hostile insinuations about the insolvency of the Confederacy and the love of CSA treasurer Edward C. Elmore for gambling at faro, the enraged treasurer challenged Daniel to a pistol duel. It was true that the Confederate treasury was empty of gold and silver, but Elmore succeeded in putting some lead into Daniel's leg.

In the wake of the dueling wound, Daniel's health rapidly declined. His editorials became despondent and he became a prophet of the defeat of the Confederacy. He died in Richmond on March 30, 1865, at age 39. The CSA and the Richmond Examiner both did not long survive him.

== See also ==
- List of Confederate duels

== Bibliography ==
- Bridges, Peter (2002). Pen of Fire: John Moncure Daniel. Kent, Ohio: Kent State University Press. ISBN 978-2910981761.
