= American Hotel (Staunton, Virginia) =

Coordinates: 38°8′51.9″N 79°4′19.6″W

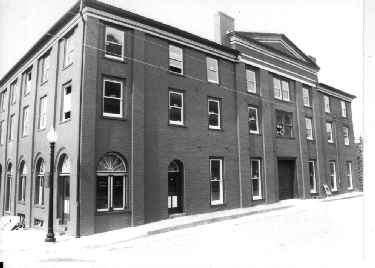
The historic American Hotel building

The American Hotel was a historic hotel located at 125 South Augusta Street in Staunton, Virginia. It was built in the downtown wharf district, directly across from the railroad station. It has since been repainted and houses several different businesses. Earlier in its existence, the hotel had a set of two pillars in the front of the building.

== History ==
In the late 1800s the Wharf area of Staunton was the site of the Virginia Central Railroad which crossed the Blue Ridge Mountains to Staunton, thus completing its route between the Shenandoah Valley and the state Capital in Richmond. The American Hotel was constructed by the Virginia Central Railroad in 1855, only one year after the railroad had reached Staunton.

During the American Civil War, the hotel served as a "receiving hospital" for Confederate sick and wounded. In 1864, when Union General Hunter occupied Staunton and burned the station, the American Hotel was spared, probably because the owner, John Quincy Adams Nadenbousch, had developed a relationship with Union officers.

In the first year of his presidency, Ulysses S. Grant took a brief vacation trip to White Sulphur Springs stopping overnight in Staunton at the American Hotel. When the news of his arrival spread, a music band that had previously served as Stonewall Jackson’s headquarters band assembled at the station opposite his Hotel room and serenaded Grant. Grant came out on hotel balcony and acknowledged the band by raising his hat. The incident was one of the first public acts of reconciliation after the American Civil War.

The Staunton Development Company was on the west end of the building in 1891 and the rest of the building was a shoe factory. Staunton Development Company wanted to renovate and update the Hotel in the Victorian style but did not have the finances.

In 1894, the American Hotel became Bowling Spotts & Co, a wholesale grocery. They were receivers over all the railroad systems of the country, from California to the Atlantic Coast. They specialized in the handling of Havana and domestic cigars, chewing and smoking tobacco, teas, spices, high grade canned goods and provisions of all kinds.

Between 1921 and 1929, the front part of the building was used as a railway express office. As most downtown cities declined in the 1960s, 1970s and 1980s, the building was no longer utilized.

In 1994, Restoration Concepts Inc attempted to rehabilitate the hotel, but the project was never approved. In 2003, Emerald City L.P. renovated the building for professional offices, a café and a banquet room. A two story parking garage was built and an elevator was installed. The building was totally renovated with fire sprinkler systems, fire escape stairways, new HVAC systems, and a complete electrical renovation. Frazier Associates of Staunton was the architect that oversaw the 2003 renovations.
