= R. E. Lee Camp Confederate Soldiers' Home =

Building and former home in Virginia, US

Coordinates: 37.5569°N 77.4748°W

- Interactive map of the R. E. Lee Camp Confederate Soldiers' Home area

General information
- Location: Richmond, Virginia, US
- Opened: January 1, 1885; 141 years ago

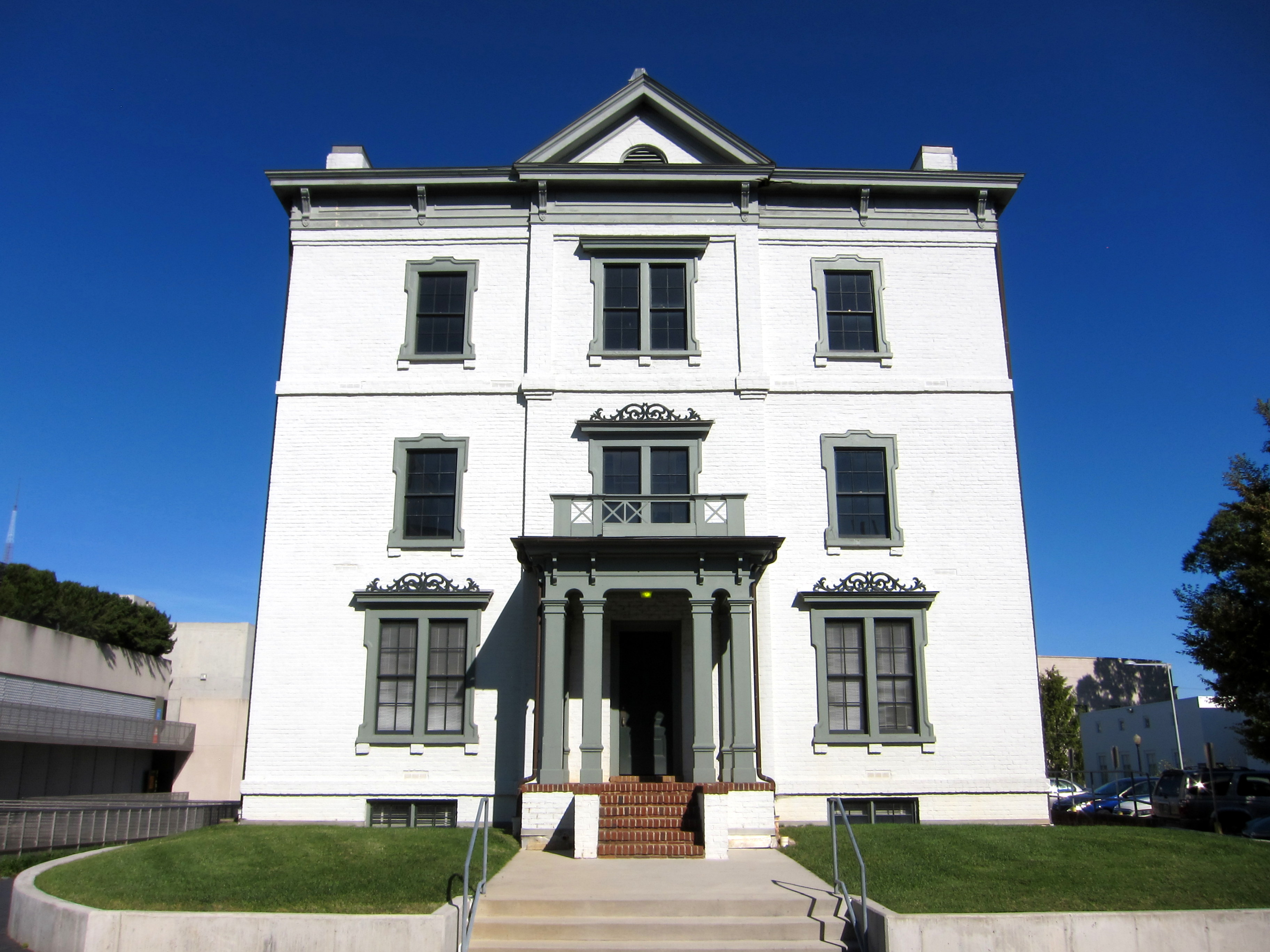

The R. E. Lee Camp Confederate Soldiers' Home was a support home for veterans of the Confederate States Army after the American Civil War. It was located in Richmond, Virginia, and was active from 1885 to 1941.

== 1885 founding ==
The home was founded on January 1, 1885, by the R. E. Lee Camp No. 1 as a support home for veterans of the Confederate States Army . The camp home was built with private funds from both Confederate and Union veterans (the Grand Army of the Republic being one of its biggest donators). Due to the bipartisan support of the home, the Confederate Soldiers' Home became a favorite meeting site for the Blue and Gray reunions.

== Activities (1885–1941) ==
The building complex included a hospital, a dining hall, a workshop, a recreation center, 10 cottages, a nondenominational chapel, and a laundry center, among other services for the veterans. Throughout the 56-year history of the home, from 1885 until the final resident died in 1941, the home saw around 3,000 total residents, with peak residency reaching 300 at one time during 1890–1910.

== Later uses (1941–present) ==
After the final resident died, the Commonwealth of Virginia was given ownership and designated it a Confederate memorial park. A notable practitioner at the home was Joseph DeJarnette, a vocal proponent of racism and eugenics (specifically the sterilization of the mentally ill) whose uncle, Daniel Coleman DeJarnette Sr., was part of the First and Second Confederate Congress as well as a member of the Virginia House of Delegates and the United States House of Representatives. The Virginia Museum of Fine Arts is now on the grounds of the R. E. Lee Camp Confederate Soldiers' Home.
