= The Valley of the Shadow =

The Valley of the Shadow is a digital history project about the American Civil War, launched in 1993 and hosted by the University of Virginia. It details the experiences of Confederate soldiers from Augusta County, Virginia and Union soldiers from Franklin County, Pennsylvania, United States.

Project founders William G. Thomas III and Edward L. Ayers referred to it as "an applied experiment in digital scholarship." The site contains scanned copies of four newspapers from each of the counties in addition to those of surrounding cities such as Richmond and New York: the Staunton Spectator (Staunton, Virginia; Whig), the Republican Vindicator (Staunton, Virginia; Democratic), the Franklin Repository and Transcript (Chambersburg, Pennsylvania; Republican), and the Valley Spirit (Chambersburg, Pennsylvania; Democratic). Elsa A. Nystrom and Justin A. Nystrom state about the site:

...the digital article challenges the user to select their own path through the material, following what most closely aligns with their specific interests – "alternative readings" in the words of the authors. Initially, their use of the digital medium seems fairly straightforward until one realizes just how much is there, and as an extension, how much one might miss inadvertently.

In 2022, on the 30th anniversary of the project, New American History released an updated version of the Valley of the Shadow with enhanced images and search features.
