= Edward C. Elmore =

Confederate office holder (~1826–1873)

Treasurer of the Confederate States of America
- In office March 6, 1861 – July 18, 1864
- President: Jefferson Davis
- Succeeded by: George Trenholm

Personal details
- Born: c. 1826
- Died: November 13, 1873 Pensacola, Florida, US
- Cause of death: Yellow fever
- Education: South Carolina College
- Known for: Treasurer of the Confederate States, Confederate duellist

Edward Carrington Elmore (c. 1826 – 1873) was an American politician. He served as the Treasurer of the Confederate States of America during the American Civil War. His signature appears on collectible Confederate currency, and he designed several of the Confederacy's coins.

== Biography ==
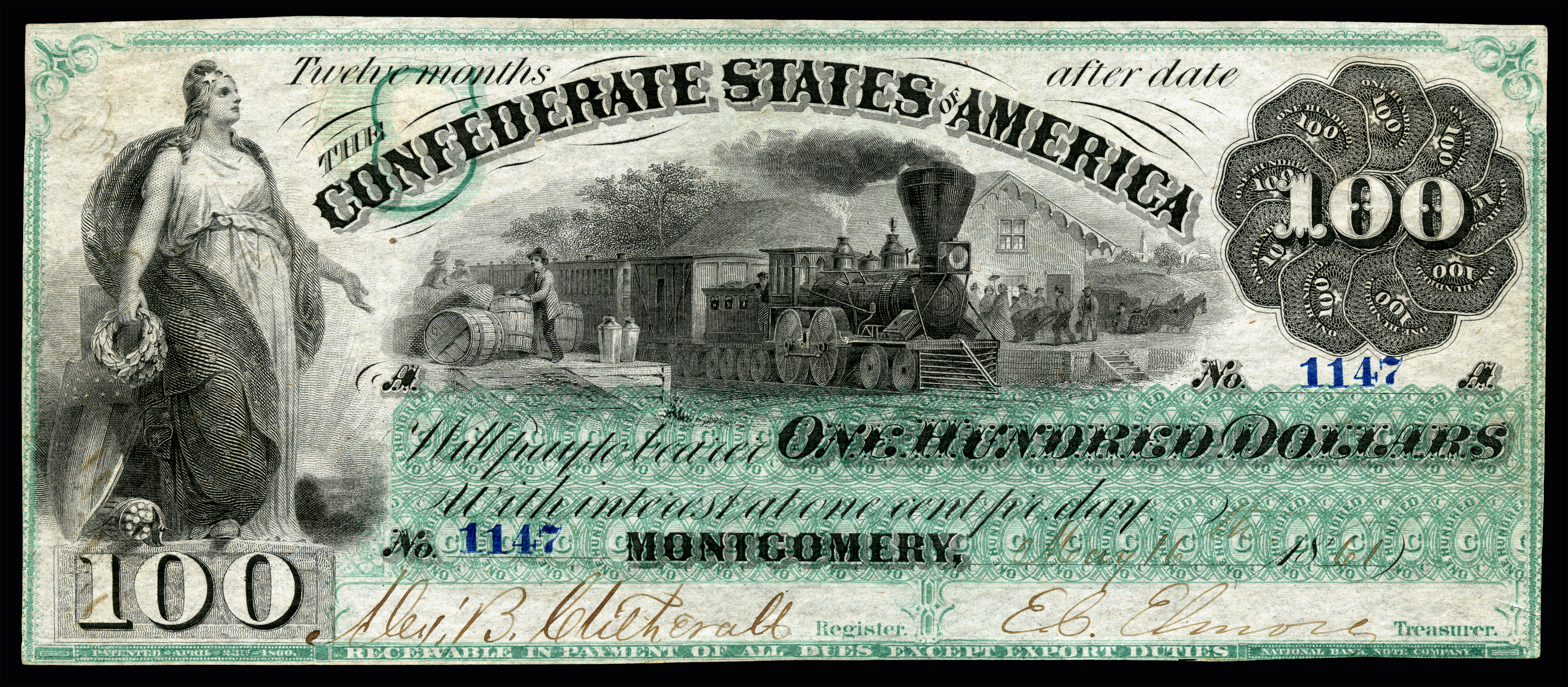
CSA first issue (1861) $100 signed by Elmore as Treasurer.

Elmore was a well-educated native of Columbia, South Carolina. Some accounts have him a native of Alabama; he was related to Judge John A. Elmore, who had been law partners with William Lowndes Yancey, and he "was related to leading families in Alabama and South Carolina." American Revolutionary War General John Archer Elmore was his grandfather. He received his education at South Carolina College. He became a prominent banker and married the daughter of a prominent family, Caroline Elizabeth Sims, on April 7, 1852. Shortly before the outbreak of the Civil War, he moved to Montgomery, Alabama.

Shortly after the creation of the Confederacy, President Jefferson Davis recommended Elmore as its first treasurer, a decision endorsed by the Confederate States Secretary of the Treasury Christopher Memminger and ratified by the Provisional Confederate Congress. He took office on March 6, 1861. In his official capacity, Elmore had to receive, count, keep, and disburse government funds in cooperation with the Congress and other agencies. All requisitions drawn upon the national treasury had first to pass Elmore's inspection before they could assume the form of executive warrants. Even a warrant approved by the Comptroller and sanctioned by Memminger was subject to Elmore's review before being paid.

Memminger resigned his post as Secretary of the Treasury on July 18, 1864, and was replaced by fellow South Carolinian George Trenholm. However, Elmore initially stayed on as Treasurer under Trenholm.

In August 1864, Elmore accused John Moncure Daniel, the controversial editor of the Richmond Examiner, of slandering him by accusing Elmore and Secretary of State Judah P. Benjamin of gambling away government funds at a private club. When no retraction was forthcoming from the newspaperman, Elmore demanded a duel. The two opponents met on Belle Isle, and Elmore wounded Daniels with his first shot. One sympathetic former soldier later wrote, "The result of this duel occasioned as many hearty congratulations among the true Confederates in Richmond as if it had been the announcement of a victory by General Lee over the Federal army."

Shortly afterward, Elmore resigned his position as Treasurer and was replaced by John N. Hendren on October 10, 1864.

Elmore died of yellow fever at Pensacola, Florida on November 13, 1873, in an outbreak that killed a total of 62 people in the city that year.

== See also ==
- List of Confederate duels

Preceded by none	Confederate States Treasurer; 1861–1864	Succeeded by John N. Hendren
