= Valley Hotel =

Historic building in Staunton, Virginia

Coordinates: 38°9′16″N 79°4′22.2″W

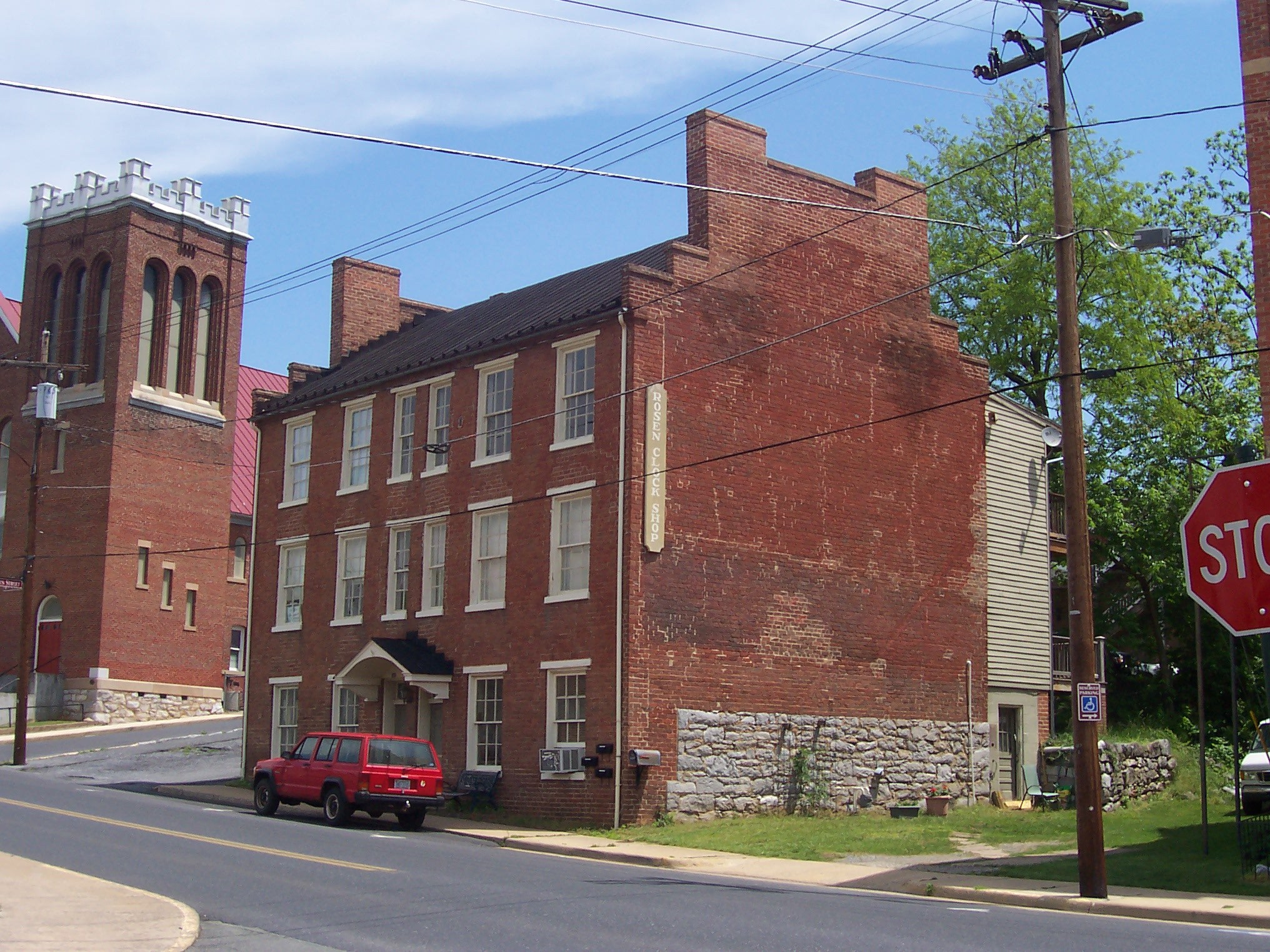
The former Valley Hotel Building.

The Valley Hotel is a historic building that was constructed in Staunton, Virginia built around 1815.

The Valley Hotel is located on Augusta Street across the street from a Baptist church (shown in picture). After it was a hotel, the building became a center for the African-American community. As of 2007, it housed a clock shop.
