= Joseph DeJarnette =

American physician and activist (1866–1957)

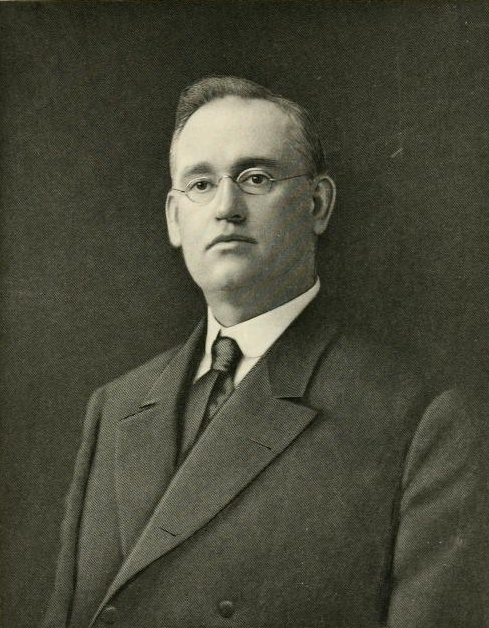

Director of Western State Hospital
- In office 1905–1943

Personal details
- Born: September 29, 1866 Spotsylvania County, Virginia, U.S.
- Died: September 3, 1957 (aged 90) Staunton, Virginia, U.S.
- Spouse: Chertsey Hopkins (m. 1906)
- Relatives: Daniel Coleman DeJarnette
- Education: Virginia Commonwealth University (MD)
- Profession: Physician

Joseph Spencer DeJarnette (September 29, 1866 – September 3, 1957) was the director of Western State Hospital (located in Staunton, Virginia) from 1905 to November 15, 1943. He was a vocal proponent of racial segregation and eugenics, specifically, the compulsory sterilization of the mentally ill.

== Early life ==
Joseph DeJarnette was born on his family's plantation, Pine Forest, in Spotsylvania County, Virginia to parents Elliott Hawes DeJarnette, formerly a Captain in the Confederate Army and Evelyn Magruder DeJarnette. The DeJarnettes were descended from French Huguenot immigrants who settled in Virginia during the colonial period and had been prominent Virginia planters for generations. An earlier Joseph DeJarnette had founded the "Spring Grove" plantation in nearby Caroline County in 1740, built a home about a half mile east of the modern Mattaponi River Bridge (Route 301), served as a local road overseer (as had his son Joseph Jr.) and debt collector, and came to own about 5000 acres between the Mattaponi River and Maracossic Creek. That Joseph's second son (this man's uncle), Daniel C. DeJarnette (1822-1881), had been the first family member to achieve political prominence, for he had served as one of Caroline County's representatives in the Virginia House of Delegates in 1853 and later in the U.S. House of Representatives as well as the Confederate Congress during the Civil War. His maternal grandfather Benjamin Henry Magruder (1808-1885) was also a prominent Virginia lawyer and legislator.

During this man's career, two distant relatives served in the Virginia House of Delegates, and were thus partly responsible for funding various state institutions at or with which Dr. DeJarnette worked. R.L. Dejarnette (1861-1922) represented Halifax County where the earlier Joseph's son James had settled after receiving land grants for his Revolutionary War Service. Edmund DeJarnette (1897-1966) served in the Virginia House of Delegates representing nearby Hanover and King William Counties.

== Early career and personal life ==
After graduating from the Medical College of Virginia in 1888, Dr. DeJarnette practiced at the R. E. Lee Camp Confederate Soldiers' Home in Richmond for a year before joining the staff of the Western Lunatic Asylum in Staunton. The asylum was renamed "Western State Hospital" in 1894. On February 14, 1906, he married a colleague, Dr. Chertsey Hopkins, a physician at Western State Hospital, as he was advised that being a married man was necessary for career advancement. She continued to practice medicine following the marriage and the couple had no children.

== Career ==
In 1906, DeJarnette worked with Aubrey Strode and Albert Priddy to establish the Virginia State Colony for Epileptics and Feebleminded in Lynchburg.

A devout Presbyterian, DeJarnette supported the temperance movement. He believed that sterilizing people with certain traits that he believed to be hereditary would prevent these traits from being passed on to future generations. "To this class of the unfit belong the insane, the epileptic, the alcoholic, hereditary criminal, the syphilitic, the imbecile and the idiot, and none of these should reproduce," DeJarnette wrote. "If proper steps be taken, the unfit can be made to grow annually smaller, and finally disappear entirely from our registers."

In the early 1920s, DeJarnette, began lobbying intensively for the Commonwealth of Virginia to pass a compulsory sterilization law. He became so frustrated with his opponents in the Virginia assembly that he said "When they voted against it, I really felt they ought to have been sterilized as unfit." When E. Lee Trinkle, a longtime political colleague of Strode and supporter of the eugenics movement, was elected Governor of Virginia in 1922, DeJarnette achieved an influential political supporter for his campaign. In order for the bill to pass the legislature, the men focused on changing public sentiment by broadening the public’s knowledge of eugenic science and the laws of hereditary defect. Governor Trinkle released a report on the critical financial condition of the Commonwealth. Within the report, Trinkle reported that one of the largest contributions to Virginia’s dire financial state was the increased spending on institutionalizing what he called "defectives". Trinkle advocated the compulsory sterilization law as a cost-saving strategy for public institutions that had experienced growth in the incarceration of what he referred to as feeble-minded and defective populations. Trinkle added that legalizing sterilization for the insane, epileptic, and feeble-minded persons would allow these patients to leave the institutions and not propagate their own kind. Virginia's "Eugenical Sterilization Act," was signed into law by Trinkle on March 20, 1924. DeJarnette testified against Carrie Buck as an expert witness in the important eugenics case Buck v. Bell, in which the United States Supreme Court affirmed the constitutionality of Virginia's eugenics law, in a case that has been questioned since but never expressly overruled.

In 1932, DeJarnette opened a self-supporting, semiprivate mental hospital for middle-income patients, adjacent to Western State which the General Assembly named the DeJarnette State Sanatorium after him. In 1933, when Adolf Hitler rose to power as Chancellor of Germany and established a zealous eugenics program, DeJarnette watched with interest and praised Nazi eugenics policy. In 1934, he begged the General Assembly to extend Virginia's sterilization law stating; "the Germans are beating us at our own game and are more progressive than we are."

In 1938, DeJarnette compared the progress of eugenics in the United States unfavorably with that in Nazi Germany, stating "Germany in six years has sterilized about 80,000 of her unfit while the United States with approximately twice the population has only sterilized about 27,869 to January 1, 1938 in the past 20 years... The fact that there are 12,000,000 defectives in the US should arouse our best endeavors to push this procedure to the maximum."

DeJarnette was also a poet of sorts. He wrote a poem entitled Mendel's Law: A Plea for a Better Race of Men, which he read in public on a number of occasions. An excerpt follows:

This is the law of Mendel,
And often he maken it plain,
Defectives will breed defectives,
And the insane breed insane.
Oh why do we allow these people
To breed back to the monkey's nest,
To increase our country's burdens
When we should only breed the best?

In 1943, State Hospital Board board removed him as superintendent of Western State due to concerns over his autocratic leadership style and the decrepit condition of the hospital. He remained in charge of the semi-private DeJarnette Sanatorium until 1947 and continued to advocate eugenics after the Nazi Holocaust was exposed at the end of World War II.

== Death and legacy ==
DeJarnette died in 1957 and was interred next to his wife, who had predeceased him, in her family cemetery in Bath County, Virginia.

The DeJarnette Sanatorium, opened in 1932, was named for him in his lifetime. In the 1960s, after his death, the name was changed to The DeJarnette Center for Human Development. It was converted to a children's mental hospital in 1975, at which time it ceased to be a private enterprise, and the state of Virginia took over operation of the facility. In 1996, a new complex known as the DeJarnette Center was constructed. Although eugenic sterilization continued in Virginia until 1979, by the turn of the 21st century eugenic ideas were widely rejected as pseudoscience. This has significantly harmed the reputation of DeJarnette and other 20th century eugenicists whose ideas were once considered scientific and progressive. In 2001, the Virginia General Assembly renamed the Dejarnette Center the Commonwealth Center for Children and Adolescents due to Dr. DeJarnette's involvement with eugenics.

== See also ==
- Racial Integrity Act of 1924
