= Commonwealth Center for Children and Adolescents =

Psychiatric hospital in Virginia, United States

Coordinates: 38°7′55″N 79°2′6.1″W

The Commonwealth Center for Children and Adolescents, formerly known as The DeJarnette Center for Human Development, is a children's mental hospital located in the city of Staunton, Virginia, in the United States.

At its present location, the facility has four units which house up to 12 patients each. It is the only mental health facility for children and adolescents operated by the Virginia Department of Behavioral Health and Developmental Services in the state (with the exception of a few beds available at other mental health hospitals for adolescents).

== History ==
Founded in 1932 as a private pay unit of the Western State Hospital, the DeJarnette Center for Human Development (formally the DeJarnette State Sanitarium) was named after Dr. Joseph DeJarnette, a prominent Virginia psychiatrist and strong supporter of eugenics, particularly the compulsory sterilization of the mentally ill.

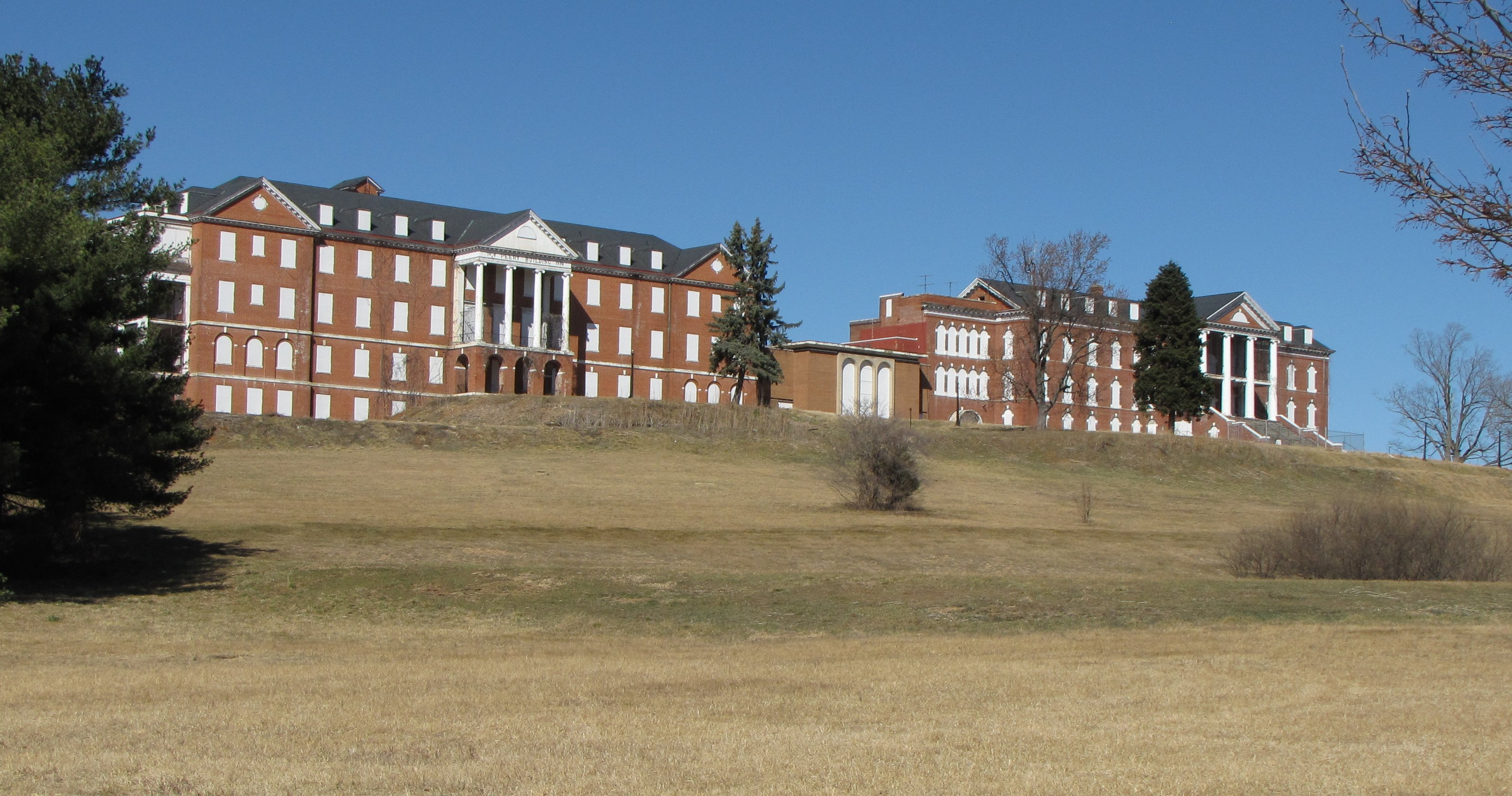
The old DeJarnette Center, seen in 2011

In 1975, the Commonwealth of Virginia assumed responsibility for the entire complex, and it was renamed "The DeJarnette Center for Human Development". The institution maintained financial independence from its foundation in 1932 until it was re-formatted in 1975, and at that time, was absorbed into the state-managed health-care system as it existed in the 1970s. At the time of the conversion, patients above the age of 21 were transferred to the relatively new campus of Western State Hospital, which had moved from downtown Staunton to its current location (parallel to the DeJarnette Center, on the opposite side of Richmond Road) during the early 1960s. As a matter of practicality, and perhaps to inaugurate the official transition from private to public funding, the cafeteria of the late 1940s was demolished and a new two-story building was constructed with an open lobby and cafeteria on the first floor, and administrative offices on the second floor. This final addition to the DeJarnette Center connected the original two buildings of the sanatorium, which were constructed in 1932 and 1938.

1981 was a year of drastic change for the center. In early 1981, the DeJarnette Center for Human Development began an effort to service patients throughout the year; prior to that time, the young patients were sent to their parents' homes or therapeutic foster homes each weekend and went for extended visits during the summer to their parents' homes. Additionally, the former Adolescent Unit of Western State Hospital was shut down, and minors of adolescent age were permanently transferred to the DeJarnette Center. This was the apex of the scope and size of the DeJarnette Center. A concrete above-ground pool was constructed, and was in operation until the late 1980s, at which time insurance costs became excessive.

In late 1987, the stock markets crashed, and the resulting economic turmoil expressed a terrible strain upon the taxpayer-supported funding of many public programs operated by the Commonwealth of Virginia at that time. By 1990, the impact of severe budget cuts became evident; facilities such as the DeJarnette Center, and the quality and relative luxuries (such as the swimming pool) of state-funded hospital operations, collapsed into a cesspool of underfunded community-based operations. Mental health care and services provided for by the Commonwealth of Virginia would never again see the funding priority which they had held during the 1970s and early 1980s.

In 1996, the DeJarnette Center relocated to a new 48-bed facility, adjacent to the grounds of Western State Hospital.

In 2001, the facility was renamed the Commonwealth Center for Children and Adolescents following a vote by the State Board of the Virginia Department of Mental Health, Mental Retardation and Substance Abuse Services.

In 2004, plans were made to demolish the original DeJarnette complex, and to replace it with a shopping mall and parking lot. However, plans for the project fell through when not enough tenants were secured for the proposed mall.

As of 2026, the campus of the former DeJarnette Center for Human Development still exists, though in a considerable state of disrepair. With it now being for sale and trees & bushes surrounding the facility being chopped down, It is still a popular site with urban explorers.
