= Moses Nadenbousch House =

Historic home in West Virginia

- U.S. National Register of Historic Places
- Location within West Virginia Location within the United States
- Location: 2540 Butler's Chapel Rd., near Martinsburg, West Virginia
- Coordinates: 39°32′6″N 77°59′30″W
- Area: 6 acres (2.4 ha)
- Built: 1885
- Architect: Nadenbousch, Moses
- Architectural style: Italianate
- NRHP reference No.: 04000032
- Added to NRHP: February 11, 2004

Moses Nadenbousch House, also known as Red Hill and Woodside Farm, is a historic home located near Martinsburg, Berkeley County, West Virginia. It was built in 1885 and is a 2 1/2-story, five-bay, "I"-house wood frame dwelling with Italianate-style details. It is set on a limestone foundation and has an intersecting gable roof. Also on the property is a shed, large bank barn (1903), and garage.

It was listed on the National Register of Historic Places in 2004.
