= Hotel 24 South =

Historic hotel in Staunton, Virginia, US

Coordinates: 38°8′56.9″N 79°4′13.7″W

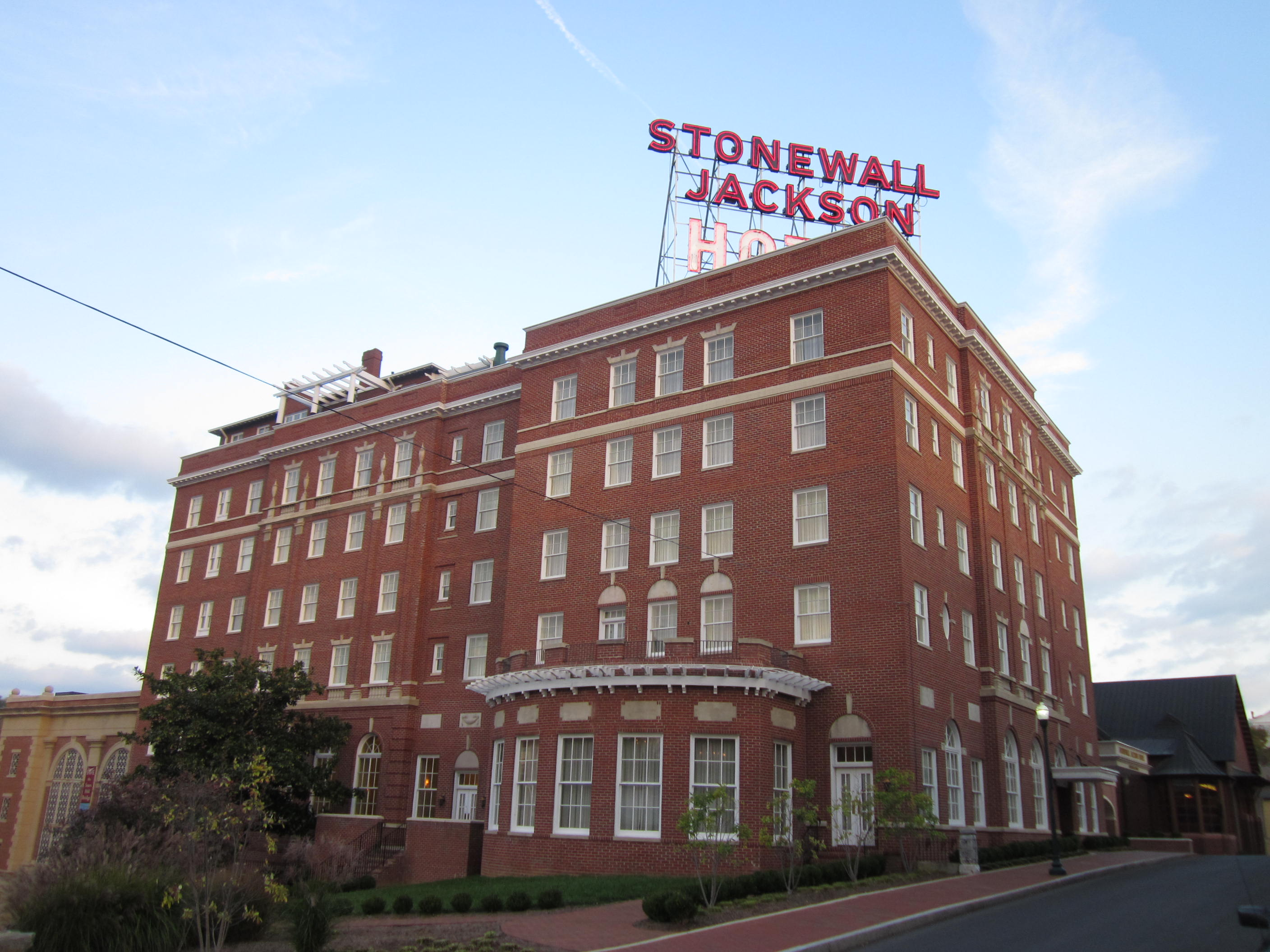
- The hotel in 2011, before it was renamed

General information
- Location: 24 S Market St., Staunton, Virginia, USA, 24401
- Opening: 1924
- Operator: Crestline Hotels & Resorts

Design and construction
- Architect: H.L. Stevens

Other information
- Number of rooms: 124

Website
- hotel24south.com

The Hotel 24 South is a historic hotel in Staunton, Virginia, opened in 1924.

== History ==
The hotel was built in 1924 as the Stonewall Jackson Hotel. Designed by H.L. Stevens, it is considered an excellent example of the architect's work in the Colonial Revival style. A working 1924 Wurlitzer organ, believed to be the only one of its kind, is located in the mezzanine of the hotel. The organ has been precisely restored to its original condition and tone. The hotel's famous neon sign was erected about 1950, and was known for many years as "a major downtown landmark".

The hotel completed a major restoration in 2005, at a cost of $19.3 million, and a further renovation in 2017 that cost $2 million. It was valued at $6 million in 2020.

After public protests in June 2020, the owners of the hotel, Staunton Hotel, LLC, announced its name, in honor of Confederate general Stonewall Jackson, would be changed. In July 2020, the lettering with the hotel's name was removed from the facade. In August 2020, after further protests, the enormous neon sign was removed from the roof, and on September 1, 2020, the hotel was officially renamed Hotel 24 South, for the hotel's address of 24 South Market Street and its grand opening year of 1924.

The hotel is operated by Crestline Hotels & Resorts and is a member of Historic Hotels of America, an official program of the National Trust for Historic Preservation

== See also ==
- List of Historic Hotels of America
