= Western State Hospital (Staunton, Virginia) =

Hospital in Virginia, US

Geography
- Location: Staunton, Virginia, United States

History
- Founded: 1828

Links
- Lists: Hospitals in Virginia

- Western State Hospital Complex
- U.S. National Register of Historic Places
- U.S. Historic district
- Virginia Landmarks Register
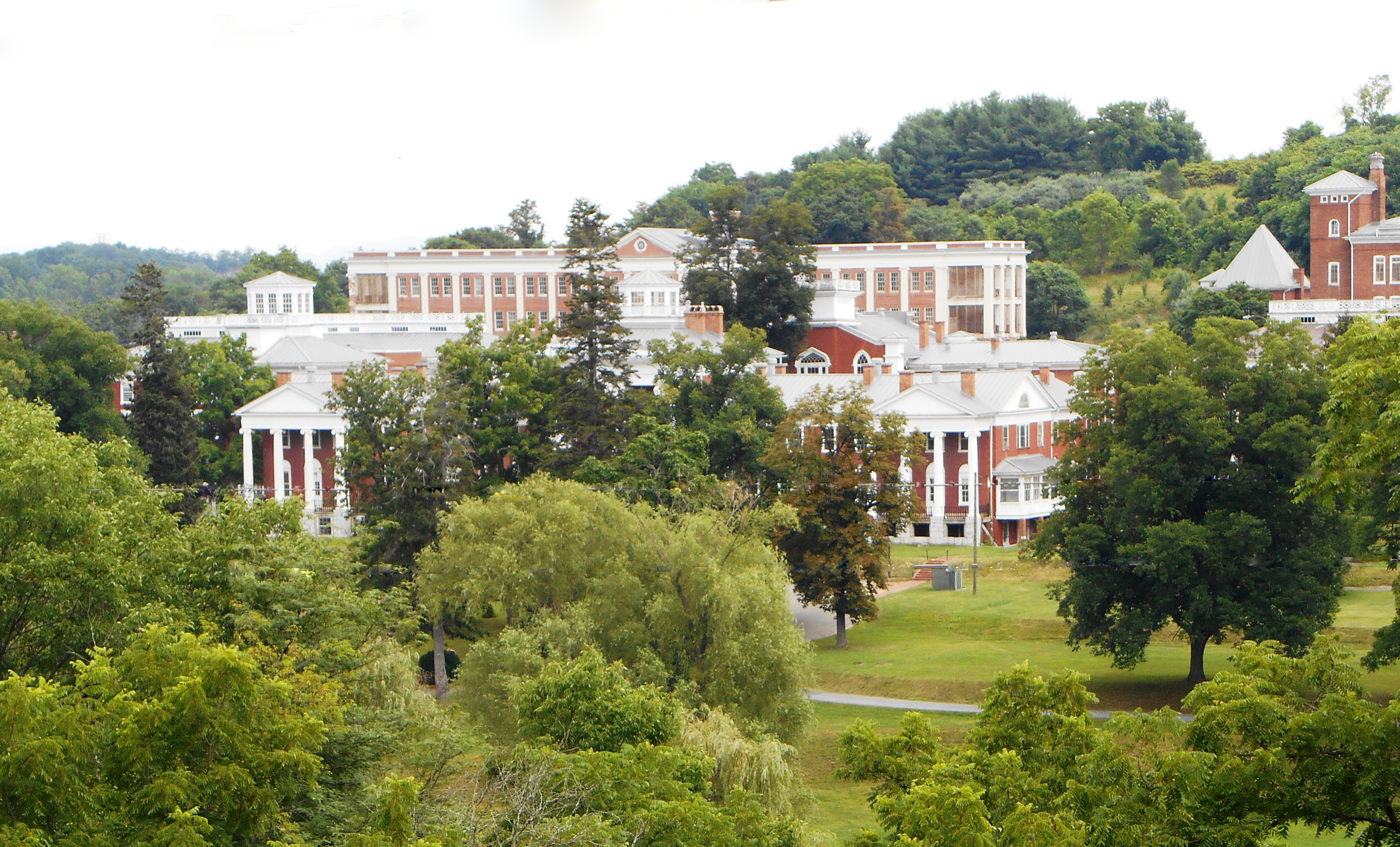
- Overview of original complex

- Location within Virginia Location within the United States
- Location: Jct. of U.S. 11 and U.S. 250, Staunton, Virginia
- Coordinates: 38°8′43″N 79°4′5″W
- Area: 43.9 acres (17.8 ha)
- Built: 1828
- Architect: William Small; Wiliam D. Phillips, Neilson, J.C; DeJarnette, Dr. Joseph, Commonwealth of Virginia
- Architectural style: Greek Revival, Classical Revival, Art Deco, Late 19th And Early 20th Century American Movements, Agricultural Vernacular
- NRHP reference No.: 69000362, 07000082, 07000766, 10000097
- VLR No.: 132-0009

Significant dates
- Added to NRHP: November 25, 1969, February 21, 2007, July 24, 2007, March 23, 2010
- Designated VLR: May 13, 1969, January 15, 1985, December 6, 2006, June 6, 2007, December 17, 2009

Western State Hospital, called Western State Lunatic Asylum in its early years, is a hospital for the mentally ill in Staunton, Virginia, which admitted its first patient on July 24, 1828.

== History ==
Around 1825, significant changes in transportation occurred with improvements to Virginia roads. The most prominent road traveled was an old Iroquois warpath and colonial wagon trail that became the Valley Turnpike in the 1830s. Travel for Americans became "swifter, safer, and more convenient" and the increase in traffic through Staunton helped development and allowed easy transportation of patients throughout the state. In 1828, the ground's location was on the outskirts of Staunton, but still very close to the downtown district and some residential areas. After the 1828 presidential election, a national trend towards humanitarian causes along with location catalyzed the project's construction in Staunton specifically: "Staunton was destined to become renowned for educating two groups that had been left out of the traditional academic process- the handicapped and women." Once the setting for a hospital was decided, the next step was the construction of a suitable structure. The hospital was renamed Western State Hospital in 1894.

In its early days, the facility was a resort-style asylum. It had terraced gardens where patients could plant flowers and take walks, roof walks to provide mountain views, and many architectural details to create an atmosphere that would aid in the healing process. However, by the mid-19th century, this utopian model of care had vanished, replaced by overcrowding in the facility and the warehousing of patients. Techniques such as "ankle and wrist restraints, physical coercion, and straitjackets" were used. After the passage of the Eugenical Sterilization Act of 1924 in Virginia, patients were forcibly sterilized at Western State until the law authorizing the practice was repealed in the 1970s. Electroshock therapy and lobotomies were also practiced at the facility. Joseph DeJarnette, a noted eugenicist, was director of the hospital from 1906 to 1943.

Western State was listed on the National Register of Historic Places on November 25, 1969, but vacated the property in the 1970s when the hospital moved to its present site near Interstate 81. The original facility was then converted to the Staunton Correctional Center, a medium-security men's penitentiary. The prison closed in 2003, and the site was left vacant for several years. In 2005, the state of Virginia gave the property to the Staunton Industrial Authority. A campus of residences called The Villages at Staunton was planned, and the first condominiums went on sale in early 2008. In 2018, a portion of the complex debuted as The Blackburn Inn and Conference Center, which was then inducted into Historic Hotels of America, the official program of the National Trust for Historic Preservation, that same year.

=== Western State Hospital Complex ===
The Western State Hospital Complex is a national historic district that encompasses 22 contributing buildings and 4 contributing structures. Notable buildings include the Dairy Barn (1927-1930, 1952), Milk House (1946), Boiler Plant (c. 1895), coal trestle (c. 1899), Wheary Building (1935), Laundry and Personnel Quarters (1865), Male and Female Patient Wards (Building #36, 1875), Byrd Building (Building #37, 1928), Doctors' Residences (1898-1939), The Main Building or Administration Building (Building 12, 1825-1828), The North Building (Building 7, 1835-1840), The chapel (Building 13, 1843, 1851), and Ward 3 (Building 6, 1842).

== See also ==
- Commonwealth Center for Children and Adolescents
