= Staunton, Virginia =

Independent city in Virginia

Staunton
- Independent city
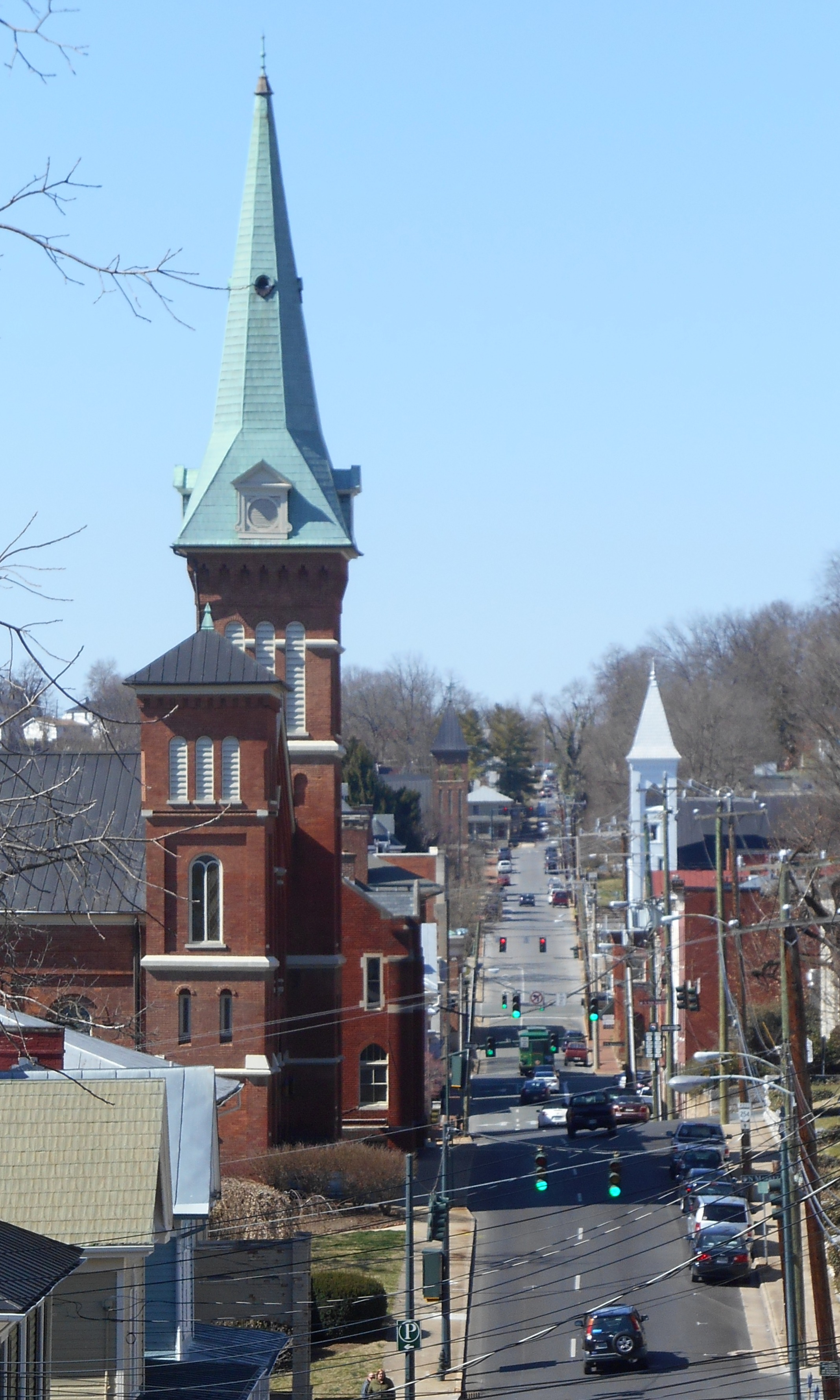
- Frederick Street

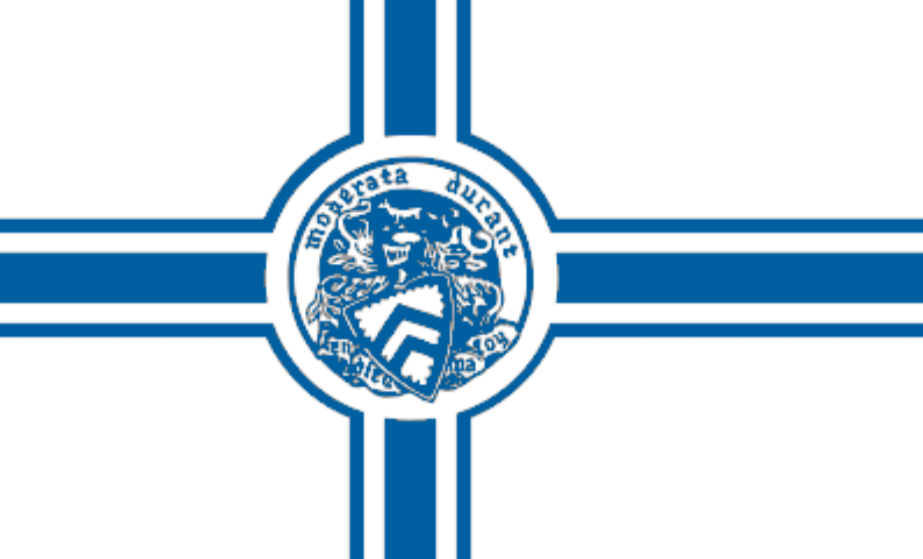
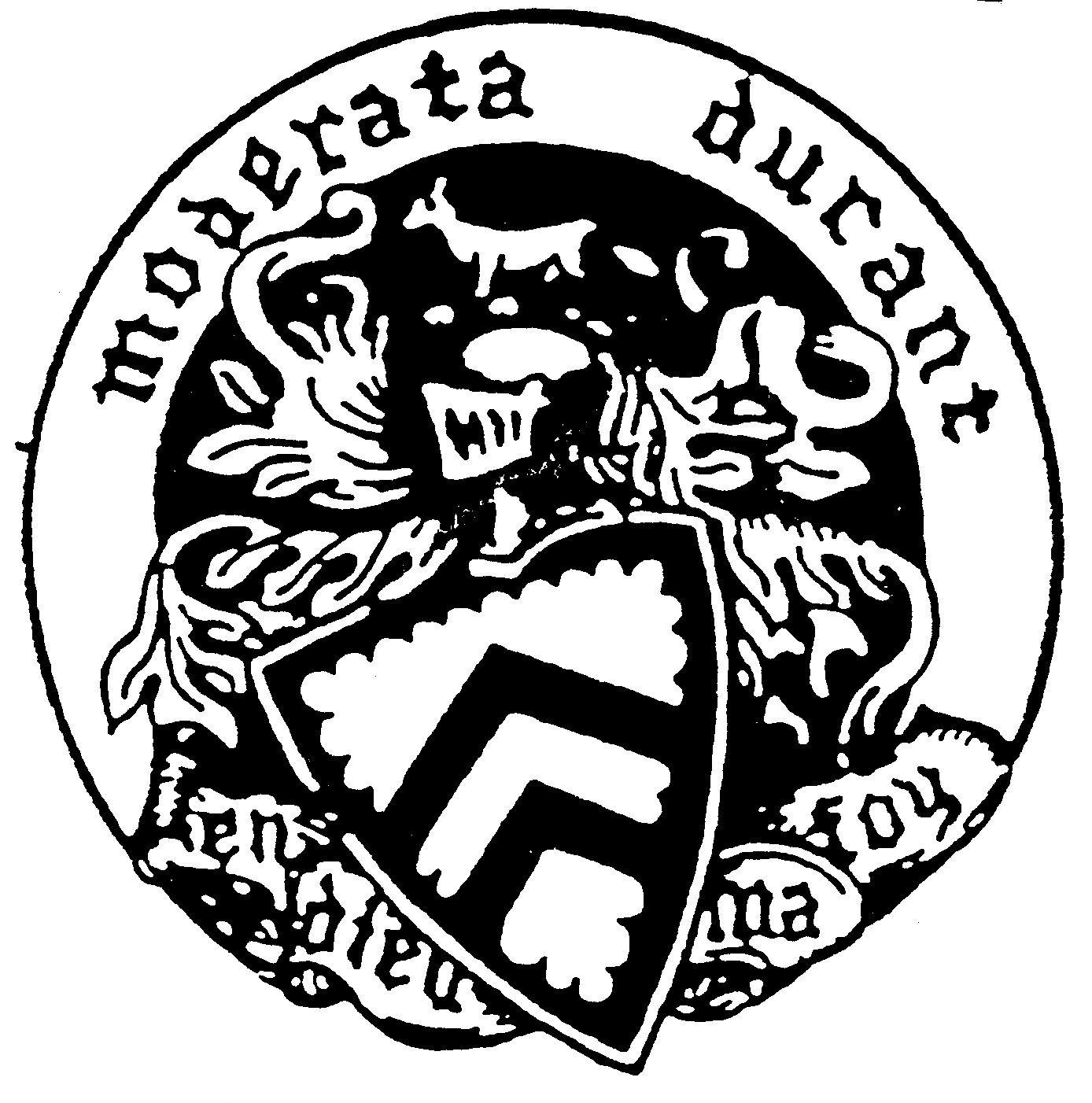
- Flag Seal
- Nickname: Queen City of the Shenandoah Valley
- Location of Staunton in the Commonwealth of Virginia

- Location within Shenandoah Valley Location within Virginia Location within the United States
- Coordinates: 38°9′29″N 79°4′35″W
- Country: United States
- State: Virginia
- County: None (Independent city)
- Incorporated: 1801
- Founder: Lady Rebecca Staunton (named for)

Government
  - Type: Council-manager government
  - City Manager: Leslie M. Beauregard
  - Mayor: Michele Edwards
  - House Delegate: Ellen Campbell (R)
  - State Senator: Chris Head (R)

Area
  - Total: 19.98 sq mi (51.74 km^{2})
  - Land: 19.92 sq mi (51.59 km^{2})
  - Water: 0.058 sq mi (0.15 km^{2})
- Elevation: 1,417 ft (432 m)

Population (2020)
  - Total: 25,750
  - Estimate (2025): 26,801 ▲
  - Density: 1,293/sq mi (499.1/km^{2})
- Time zone: UTC−5 (Eastern (EST))
  - Summer (DST): UTC−4 (EDT)
- ZIP Codes: 24401–24402
- Area code(s): 540, 826
- FIPS code: 51-75216
- GNIS feature ID: 1500154
- Website: www.staunton.va.us

Staunton (/ˈstæntən/ STAN-tən) is an independent city in the U.S. Commonwealth of Virginia. As of the 2020 census, the population was 25,750. In Virginia, independent cities are separate jurisdictions from the counties that surround them, so the government offices of Augusta County are in Verona, which is contiguous to Staunton. Staunton is a principal city of the Staunton-Stuarts Draft Metropolitan Statistical Area, which had a 2020 population of 125,433. Staunton is known for being the birthplace of Woodrow Wilson, the 28th U.S. president, and as the home of Mary Baldwin University, historically a women's college. The city is also home to Stuart Hall, a private co-ed preparatory school, as well as the Virginia School for the Deaf and Blind. It was the first city in the United States with a fully defined city manager system.

== History ==
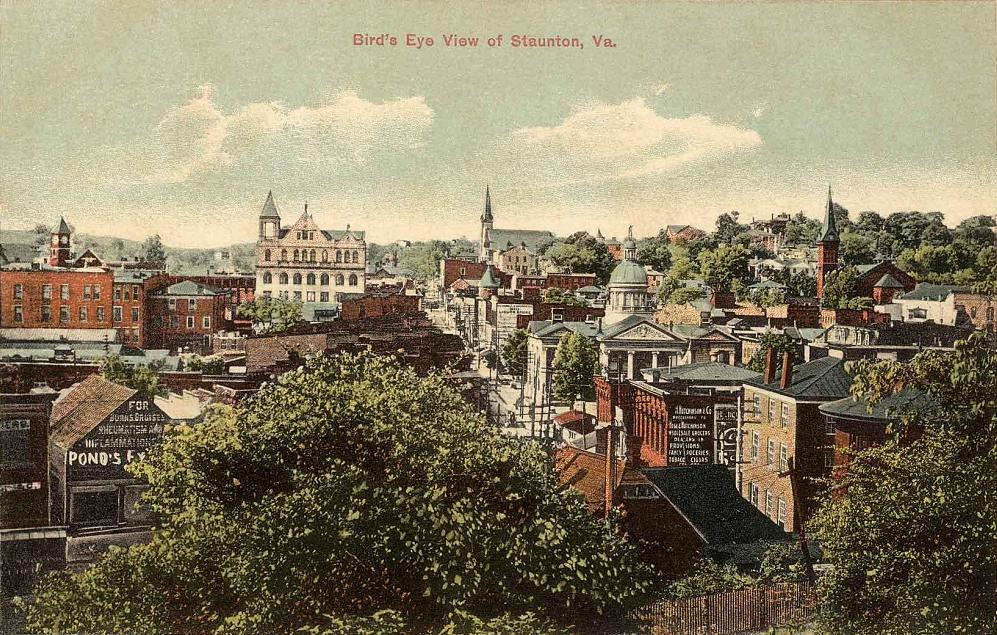
Bird's-eye view c. 1910

The area was first settled in 1732 by John Lewis and family. In 1736, William Beverley, a wealthy planter and merchant from Essex County, was granted by the Crown over 118,000 acres (48,000 hectares; 480 square kilometres; 184 square miles) in what would become Augusta County. Surveyor Thomas Lewis in 1746 laid out the first town plat for Beverley of what was originally called Beverley's Mill Place. Founded in 1747, it was renamed in honor of Lady Rebecca Staunton, wife to Royal Lieutenant-Governor Sir William Gooch. Because the town was located at the geographical center of the colony (which then included West Virginia), Staunton served between 1738 and 1771 as regional capital for much of what was later known as the Northwest Territory, with the westernmost courthouse in British North America prior to the Revolution. By 1760, Staunton was one of the major "remote trading centers in the backcountry" which coordinated the transportation of the vast amounts of grain and tobacco then being produced in response to the change of Britain from a net exporter of produce to an importer. Staunton thus played a crucial role in the mid 18th century expansion of the economies of the American Colonies which, in turn, contributed to the success of the American Revolution. It served as capital of Virginia in June 1781, when state legislators fled Richmond and then Charlottesville to avoid capture by the British.

Like most of colonial Virginia, slavery was present in Staunton. For instance, in 1815, a slave named Henry ran away from John G. Wright's Staunton plantation. Wright placed an ad in the Daily National Intelligencer in Washington, D.C. seeking Henry's return. It notes that Henry was an excellent cook and was widely travelled, having been as far as the West Indies.

=== The Civil War and immediately prior ===
In August 1855, President Franklin Pierce visited Staunton. He gave a speech at the Virginia Hotel, in which he stated that his "feelings revolted from the idea of a dissolution of the union." He said that "[i]t would be the Iliad of innumerable woes, from the contemplation of which he shrank."

Located along the Valley Pike, Staunton developed as a trade, transportation and industrial center, particularly after the Virginia Central Railroad arrived in 1854. Factories made carriages, wagons, boots and shoes, clothing and blankets. In 1860, the Staunton Military Academy was founded. By 1860, Staunton had at least one pro-Union, pro-slavery (the Staunton Spectator) and at least one pro-secession, pro-slavery newspaper (the Staunton Vindicator). The Spectator ran editorials before the war urging its citizens to vote for union, while the Vindicator ran, e.g., stories reporting on "unruly" slaves mutilating themselves to escape being sold.

On May 23, 1861, shortly after the firing on Fort Sumter began the American Civil War, Virginians voted on whether to ratify articles of secession from the Union and join the Confederate States. The articles were overwhelmingly approved throughout the Commonwealth, even in the majority of the counties that would later become West Virginia. The vote in Staunton was 3,300 in favor of secession, with only 6 opposed. During the war, the town became an important Shenandoah Valley manufacturing center, a staging area, and a supply depot for the Confederacy.

On June 6, 1864, Union Major General David Hunter arrived with 10,000 troops to cut supply, communication and railway lines useful to the Confederacy. The next day, they destroyed the railroad station, warehouses, houses, factories and mills. Union soldiers looted the stores and warehouses and confiscated supplies.

=== Postbellum Staunton ===
On July 10, 1902, Staunton became an independent city. In 1908, Staunton adopted the city manager form of government. Charles E. Ashburner was hired by Staunton as the nation's first city manager.

On January 26, 1926, Staunton adopted Lady Rebecca Staunton's coat of arms for use as the city's official coat of arms and its flag.

=== Western State Hospital ===
Staunton is also home to the former Western State Asylum, a hospital for the mentally ill, which originally began operations in 1828. The hospital was renamed Western State Hospital in 1894.

In its early days, the facility was a resort-style asylum. It had terraced gardens where patients could plant flowers and take walks, roof walks to provide mountain views, and many architectural details to create an atmosphere that would aid in the healing process. However, by the mid 19th Century, this utopian model of care had vanished, replaced by overcrowding in the facility and the warehousing of patients. Techniques such as "ankle and wrist restraints, physical coercion, and straitjackets" were used. After the passage of the Eugenical Sterilization Act of 1924 in Virginia, patients were forcibly sterilized at Western State until the law authorizing the practice was repealed in the 1970s. Later, electroshock therapy and lobotomies were practiced at the facility.

When Western State vacated the property and moved its adult patients to its present site near Interstate 81, the facility was renamed the Staunton Correctional Center and turned into a medium-security men's penitentiary. The prison closed in 2003, and the site was left vacant for several years. In 2005, the state of Virginia gave the original property to the Staunton Industrial Authority. It is now a condominium complex called The Villages at Staunton.

A separate complex, The DeJarnette State Sanatoruim, was constructed in 1932 and acted as a location for patients with the ability to pay for their treatment. Dr. DeJarnette was the superintendent of the sanatorium from its opening until his retirement in 1947.

== Geography ==
According to the United States Census Bureau, the city has a total area of 20 square miles (52 km^{2}), virtually all of which is land. Staunton is located in the Shenandoah Valley in between the Blue Ridge and Allegheny Mountains of the Appalachian Mountains. It is drained by Lewis Creek. Lewis Creek flows into the Middle River, which flows into the Shenandoah River, which flows into the Potomac, and eventually to the Chesapeake Bay.

=== Climate ===
According to the Köppen Climate Classification system, Staunton has a humid subtropical climate, abbreviated "Cfa" on climate maps.

Climate data for Staunton water treatment plant (1991−2020 normals, extremes 1893−present)
Month	Jan	Feb	Mar	Apr	May	Jun	Jul	Aug	Sep	Oct	Nov	Dec	Year
Record high °F (°C)	79 (26)	82 (28)	89 (32)	94 (34)	95 (35)	102 (39)	106 (41)	103 (39)	100 (38)	97 (36)	88 (31)	79 (26)	106 (41)
Mean daily maximum °F (°C)	42.4 (5.8)	45.8 (7.7)	53.8 (12.1)	64.7 (18.2)	72.7 (22.6)	80.3 (26.8)	84.1 (28.9)	82.7 (28.2)	76.7 (24.8)	66.4 (19.1)	55.2 (12.9)	45.8 (7.7)	64.2 (17.9)
Daily mean °F (°C)	33.6 (0.9)	36.2 (2.3)	43.3 (6.3)	53.6 (12.0)	62.1 (16.7)	70.1 (21.2)	73.9 (23.3)	72.4 (22.4)	66.2 (19.0)	55.3 (12.9)	45.3 (7.4)	37.1 (2.8)	54.1 (12.3)
Mean daily minimum °F (°C)	24.7 (−4.1)	26.6 (−3.0)	32.8 (0.4)	42.5 (5.8)	51.6 (10.9)	59.9 (15.5)	63.8 (17.7)	62.2 (16.8)	55.7 (13.2)	44.2 (6.8)	35.5 (1.9)	28.4 (−2.0)	44.0 (6.7)
Record low °F (°C)	−16 (−27)	−12 (−24)	−3 (−19)	12 (−11)	26 (−3)	34 (1)	41 (5)	37 (3)	22 (−6)	18 (−8)	2 (−17)	−13 (−25)	−16 (−27)
Average precipitation inches (mm)	2.88 (73)	2.38 (60)	3.43 (87)	3.26 (83)	4.06 (103)	4.11 (104)	4.15 (105)	3.97 (101)	4.21 (107)	2.61 (66)	2.62 (67)	2.96 (75)	40.64 (1,032)
Average snowfall inches (cm)	5.4 (14)	6.8 (17)	4.1 (10)	0.1 (0.25)	0.0 (0.0)	0.0 (0.0)	0.0 (0.0)	0.0 (0.0)	0.0 (0.0)	0.0 (0.0)	0.4 (1.0)	4.8 (12)	21.6 (55)
Average precipitation days (≥ 0.01 in)	8.6	7.4	9.4	10.7	13.3	11.3	11.5	11.8	9.5	8.4	7.5	9.1	118.5
Average snowy days (≥ 0.1 in)	2.2	2.6	1.6	0.1	0.0	0.0	0.0	0.0	0.0	0.0	0.2	2.0	8.7
Source: NOAA

== Demographics ==
Historical population
Census	Pop.	Note	%±
1860	3,875		—
1870	5,120		32.1%
1880	6,664		30.2%
1890	6,975		4.7%
1900	7,289		4.5%
1910	10,604		45.5%
1920	10,623		0.2%
1930	11,990		12.9%
1940	13,337		11.2%
1950	19,927		49.4%
1960	22,232		11.6%
1970	24,504		10.2%
1980	21,857		−10.8%
1990	24,461		11.9%
2000	23,853		−2.5%
2010	23,746		−0.4%
2020	25,750		8.4%
2025 (est.)	26,801	▲	4.1%
U.S. Decennial Census; 1790-1960 1900-1990; 1990-2000 2010 2020

=== Racial and ethnic composition ===
Staunton city, Virginia – Racial and ethnic composition Note: the US Census treats Hispanic/Latino as an ethnic category. This table excludes Latinos from the racial categories and assigns them to a separate category. Hispanics/Latinos may be of any race.
Race / Ethnicity (NH = Non-Hispanic)	Pop 1980	Pop 1990	Pop 2000	Pop 2010	Pop 2020	% 1980	% 1990	% 2000	% 2010	% 2020
White alone (NH)	19,206	21,077	19,728	19,584	19,959	87.87%	86.17%	82.71%	82.47%	77.51%
Black or African American alone (NH)	2,443	3,072	3,305	2,859	2,882	11.18%	12.56%	13.86%	12.04%	11.19%
Native American or Alaska Native alone (NH)	26	31	51	41	65	0.12%	0.13%	0.21%	0.17%	0.25%
Asian alone (NH)	48	101	110	182	320	0.22%	0.41%	0.46%	0.77%	1.24%
Native Hawaiian or Pacific Islander alone (NH)	x	x	2	3	11	x	x	0.01%	0.01%	0.04%
Other race alone (NH)	18	11	50	61	155	0.08%	0.04%	0.21%	0.26%	0.60%
Mixed race or Multiracial (NH)	x	x	342	503	1,270	x	x	1.43%	2.12%	4.93%
Hispanic or Latino (any race)	116	169	265	513	1,088	0.53%	0.69%	1.11%	2.16%	4.23%
Total	21,857	24,461	23,853	23,746	25,750	100.00%	100.00%	100.00%	100.00%	100.00%

=== 2020 census ===
As of the 2020 census, Staunton had a population of 25,750. The median age was 41.2 years, 18.4% of residents were under the age of 18, and 22.1% were 65 years of age or older. For every 100 females there were 86.5 males, and for every 100 females age 18 and over there were 82.5 males age 18 and over.

97.9% of residents lived in urban areas, while 2.1% lived in rural areas.

There were 11,374 households in Staunton, of which 23.8% had children under the age of 18 living in them. Of all households, 37.6% were married-couple households, 19.8% were households with a male householder and no spouse or partner present, and 34.8% were households with a female householder and no spouse or partner present. About 38.0% of all households were made up of individuals and 17.1% had someone living alone who was 65 years of age or older.

There were 12,316 housing units, of which 7.6% were vacant. The homeowner vacancy rate was 1.9% and the rental vacancy rate was 4.7%.

Racial composition as of the 2020 census
Race	Number	Percent
White	20,207	78.5%
Black or African American	2,935	11.4%
American Indian and Alaska Native	84	0.3%
Asian	323	1.3%
Native Hawaiian and Other Pacific Islander	12	0.0%
Some other race	466	1.8%
Two or more races	1,723	6.7%
Hispanic or Latino (of any race)	1,088	4.2%

=== 2000 census ===
As of the census of 2000, there were 23,853 people, 9,676 households, and 5,766 families residing in Staunton. The population density was 1,210.3 people per square mile (467.3/km^{2}). There were 10,427 housing units at an average density of 529.1 per square mile (204.3/km^{2}). The racial makeup of the city was 83.29% White, 13.95% Black or African American, 0.22% Native American, 0.46% Asian, 0.01% Pacific Islander, 0.52% from other races, and 1.55% from two or more races. Hispanic or Latino of any race were 1.11% of the population.

There were 9,676 households, out of which 24.9% had children under the age of 18 living with them, 44.4% were married couples living together, 11.7% had a female householder with no husband present, and 40.4% were non-families. Of all households, 34.7% were made up of individuals, and 14.3% had someone living alone who was 65 years of age or older. The average household size was 2.19 and the average family size was 2.81.

In the city, the population was spread out, with 19.8% under the age of 18, 10.2% from 18 to 24, 27.8% from 25 to 44, 24.1% from 45 to 64, and 18.0% who were 65 years of age or older. The median age was 40 years. For every 100 females, there were 89.1 males. For every 100 females aged 18 and over, there were 87.0 males.

The median income for a household in the city was $32,941, and the median income for a family was $44,422. Males had a median income of $30,153 versus $22,079 for females. The per capita income for the city was $19,161. About 7.7% of families and 11.7% of the population were below the poverty line, including 15.9% of those under age 18 and 10.7% of those age 65 or over.

== Economy ==
=== Top employers ===
According to Staunton's 2015 Comprehensive Annual Financial Report, the top employers in the city are:

#	Employer	# of Employees
1	Western State Hospital	500-599
2	Staunton City Schools	500-599
3	Mary Baldwin University	250-499
4	City of Staunton	250-499
5	Walmart	250-499
6	Fisher Auto Parts	250-499
7	Home Instead Senior Care	100-249
8	Cadence, Inc.	100-300
9	VDOT	100-249
10	Virginia School for the Deaf and the Blind	100-249

== Arts and culture ==
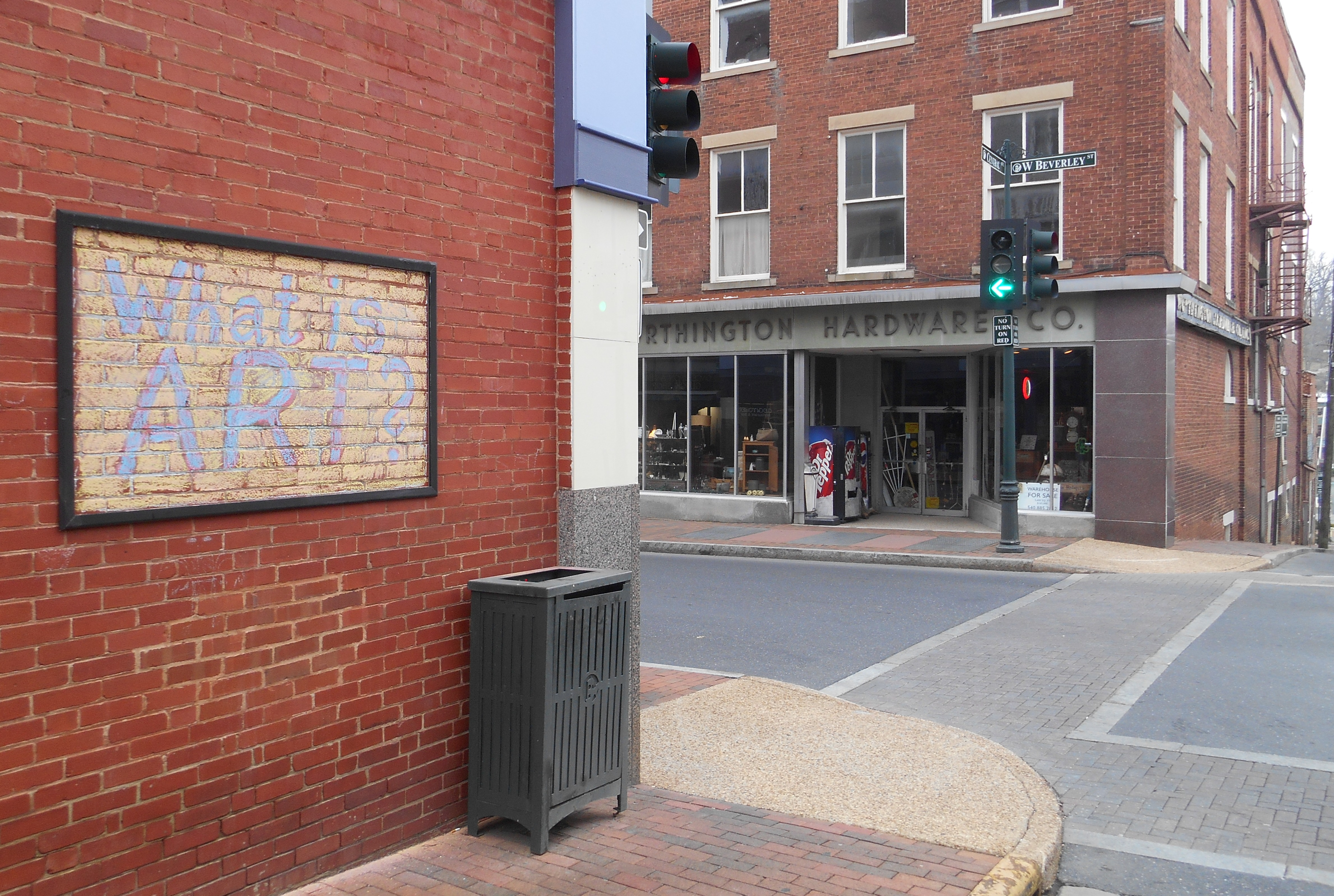
The "What is ART?" sign on the side of the Clocktower Building at the intersection of Beverley St. and Central Ave. in downtown Staunton

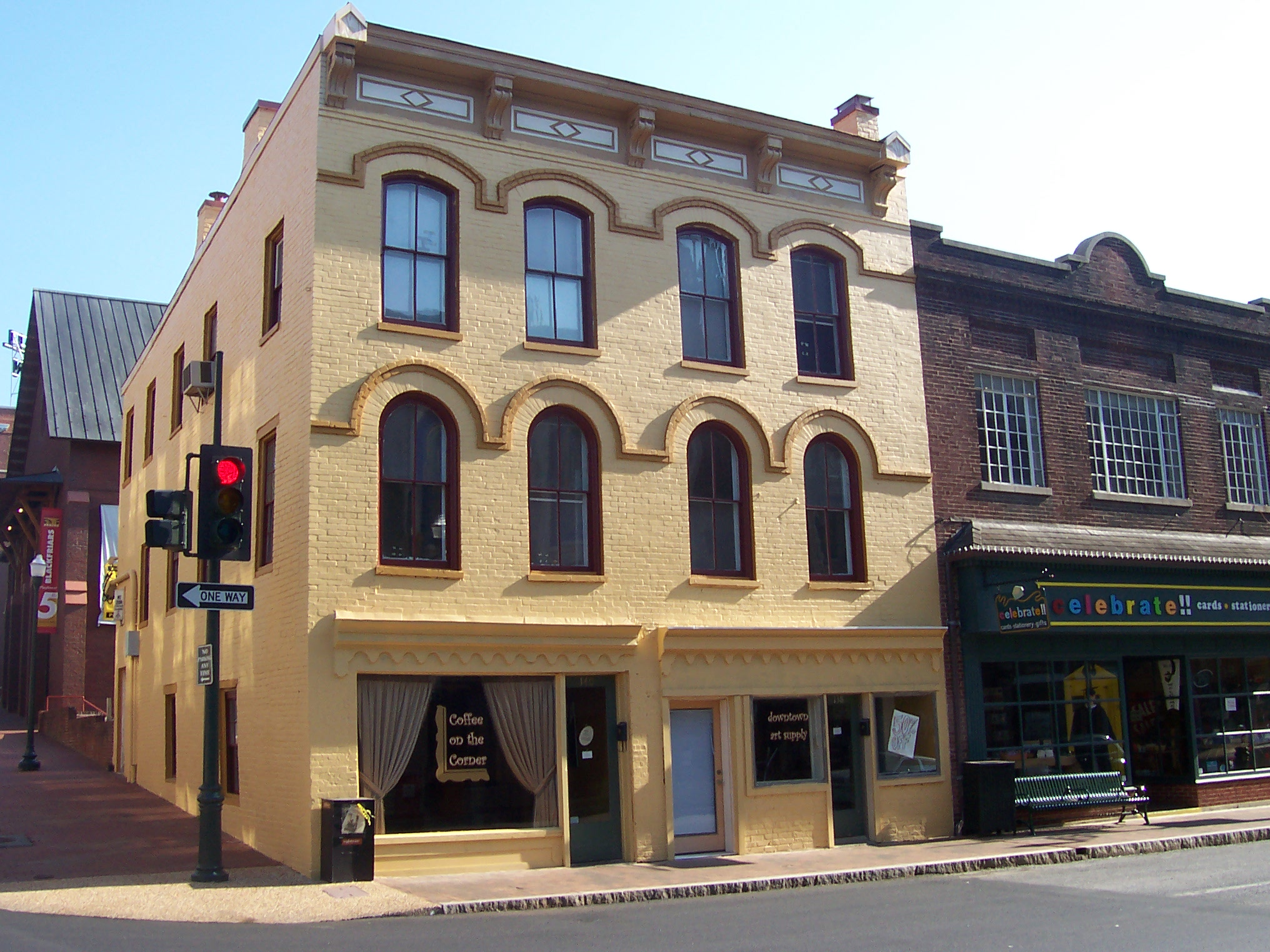
The By & By Café and Beer Garden, with Blackfriars Playhouse and the Hotel 24 South behind

Staunton is home to the American Shakespeare Center, a theatrical company centered at the Blackfriars Playhouse, a replica of Shakespeare's Blackfriars Theatre. In 2012, it also became the home of the Heifetz International Music Institute, named for renowned violinist Daniel Heifetz, a summer music school and festival dedicated to the artistic growth and career development of some of the World's most talented and promising classical musicians. The Woodrow Wilson Presidential Library is open for visitors, as well as the Museum of American Frontier Culture, which provides insight into life in early America.

The Staunton Music Festival – which celebrated its 20th year in 2017 – features multiple concerts each day, with programs of music from the Renaissance to the present. The festival takes place during the early part of August annually. All performances take place at historic venues in downtown Staunton.

The Queen City Mischief and Magic festival - which celebrated its 4th year in 2019 - is a new but quickly-growing festival for Harry Potter fans, attracting over 10,000 people in its 3rd year. Visitors from all over the east coast come to take part in games, events, and shopping throughout downtown. Businesses contribute the activities for the festival and the majority of West Beverley St is shut down for the weekend event.

Staunton is also the center of numerous galleries and art schools, the widely regarded Beverley Street Studio School and its associated Co-Art Gallery. In addition, Staunton is home to the Hypnagogia Film Collective, a collection of avant-garde experimental filmmakers.

Staunton is home to the Statler Brothers, country music legends who until 1994 performed free concerts at the annual Fourth of July celebration, accompanied by other country music artists. Statler Brothers members Don Reid, Harold Reid, and Phil Balsley grew up in the city. Lew DeWitt was also a notable member of the Statlers who grew up in Staunton.

=== Film ===
Downtown Staunton and Sherwood Avenue were used in the American Civil War film Gods and Generals. The local Shenandoah Valley Railroad as well as a number of nearby houses were used in filming of Hearts in Atlantis. In 1993, a portion of the Showtime production of Assault at West Point: The Court-Martial of Johnson Whittaker was filmed here. In the summer of 2006, some scenes for the movie Evan Almighty were also filmed in Staunton. Some scenes for Familiar Strangers were also filmed in Staunton in 2007. In 2013, scenes from the documentary film Rita Dove: An American Poet were filmed in and around Staunton's Temple House of Israel synagogue.

=== Attractions ===
Staunton is home to nearly 200 buildings designed by architect Thomas Jasper Collins (1844–1925), who worked in various styles during the Victorian era. His firm, T. J. Collins & Sons, is still in business.

The city was once home to about ten hotels, but only one of them is still in operation - Hotel 24 South. This hotel, formerly known as the "Stonewall Jackson Hotel", was renovated in the early 2000s, and is now in operation as both a hotel and a conference center. The Ingleside Resort is no longer in operation. During World War II it was used by the INS as a detention center for enemy aliens held under Executive Order 9066. Some of the hotels that are no longer in operation are The Virginia Hotel, the Eakleton Hotel, the Valley Hotel, the American Hotel and the Hotel Beverley. All of these buildings are still standing except for the Virginia Hotel, which was demolished in 1930 to make way for a planned addition to the Stonewall Jackson Hotel which was never built. The New Street Parking Garage now stands on the site.

=== National Register of Historic Places ===
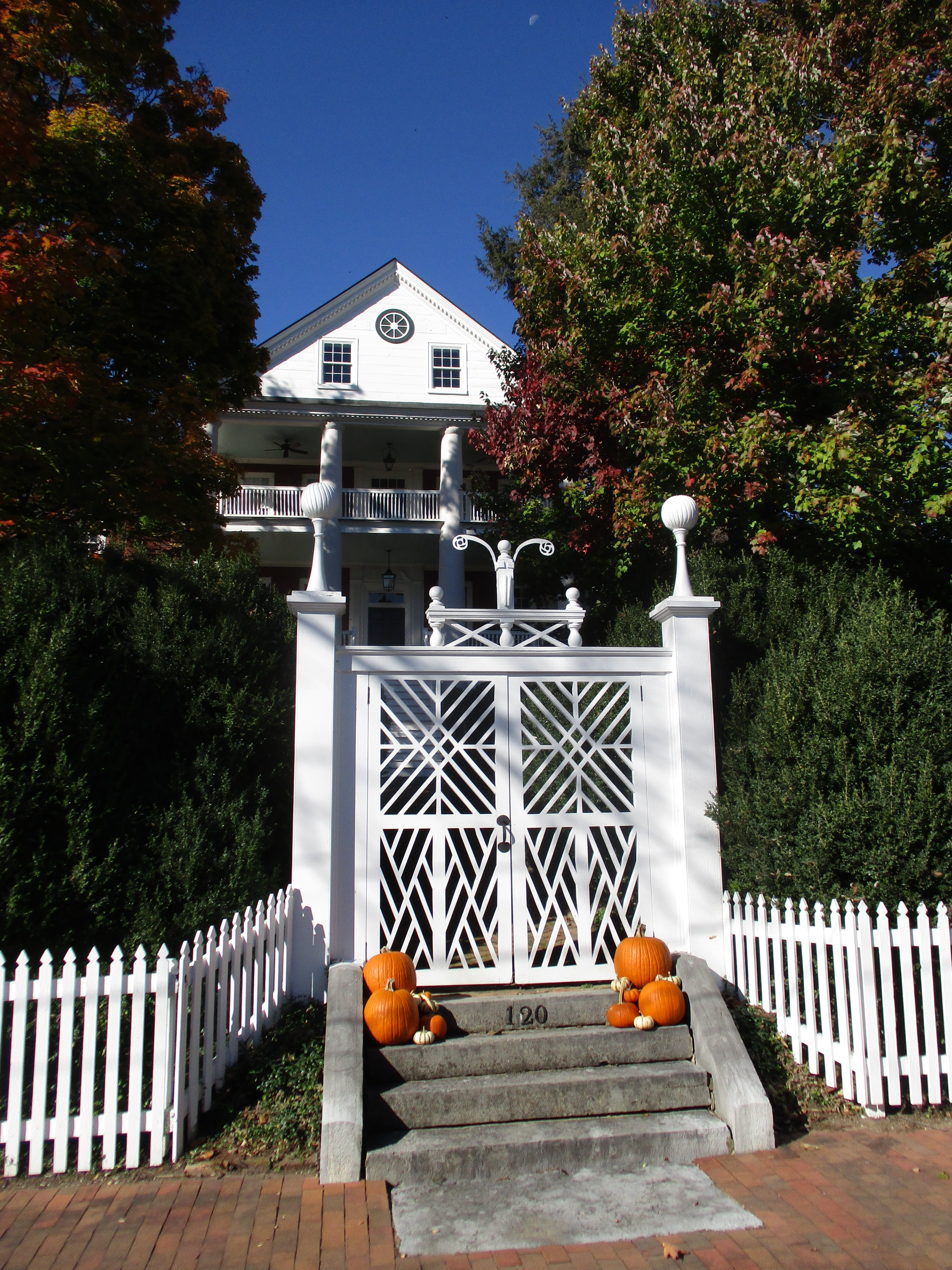
Stuart House with gate, pumpkins and last-quarter Moon

Buildings in Staunton on the National Register of Historic Places include:

- Beverley Historic District, downtown commercial vicinity
- Booker T. Washington High School, former high school for "colored" students.
- The Oaks, at 437 East Beverley Street. An 1840s structure, it was modified and enlarged in 1888 by famed Civil War cartographer Jedediah Hotchkiss.
- Sears House, a "bracketed cottage" frame house built around 1860.
- Staunton Coca-Cola Bottling Works, former Coca-Cola bottling plant in modernist structure.
- Stuart House, Jefferson-inspired 18th-century Federal-style home.
- Waverly Hill, a Georgian-revival house designed in 1929 by renowned architect William Bottomley with a landscape designed by Arthur Shurcliff.

== Sports ==
In 1894, Staunton fielded a baseball team in the original Virginia League: The Staunton Hayseeds. In 1914, the city fielded a team in the Virginia Mountain League: The Staunton Lunatics. The Lunatics moved to Harrisonburg in July 1914, just before the league disbanded. From 1939 to 1942, the city fielded a team in the second Virginia League: the Staunton Presidents. Staunton currently has no minor league baseball, but the Staunton Braves represent the city in the Valley Baseball League, a collegiate summer baseball league that plays in the Shenandoah Valley.

== Parks and recreation ==
- Betsy Bell and Mary Gray Wilderness Parks — a 70-acre (280,000 m^{2}) mountaintop park with a 1,959 feet (597 m) observation platform
- Gypsy Hill Park — a 214-acre (870,000 m^{2}) multi-use facility with a golf course, football and baseball stadiums, gymnasium, lake, two playgrounds, three youth baseball fields, public swimming pool, volleyball court, horseshoe pits, tennis courts, the Gypsy Express mini-train, the Duck Pond, a skate park, a bandstand, and several pavilions. Until the Staunton city parks were integrated, Gypsy Hill Park was only open to whites except for one day a year, which was set aside for other races to use the park.
- Montgomery Hall Park — a 148-acre (600,000 m^{2}) multi-use facility with softball and soccer fields, tennis courts, disc golf course, playgrounds, picnic shelters, hiking and mountain biking trails, and a swimming pool (which was renovated in 2016 after being closed since 2010.) The offices of the Department of Parks and Recreation are at the Irene Givens Administration building, which also includes a kitchen, activity room, and conference room which are available for public use. Montgomery Hall Park was opened in 1950 after much agitation by non-white residents of Staunton. Before segregation ended in the mid-1960s, Montgomery Hall park was the only park in the city open to African-Americans
- Booker T. Washington Community Center — formerly the segregated Booker T. Washington High School, although according to the court which decided Bell v. Staunton Board of Education, the term "high school" was a misnomer, as the school also contained "first, second, and seventh grade classes and two special mentally retarded classes as well as the eighth through the twelfth grades."
- Nelson Street Teen Center — closed (as of 2011) due to budget cuts.
- Landes Park - a small, one-acre park named after Walter James Landes, Jr. in 1993. Near downtown Staunton.
- Reservoir Hill Park - a small four-acre park located at the old city reservoir.
- Men's Green Thumb Park - approximately two acres and was created through a joint sponsorship by the Men's Green Thumb Garden Club and United Virginia Bank National Valley, 1960–1970.
- Knowles Park - Knowles Park is a small parcel of land directly across from the main entrance of Gypsy Hill Park.
- Woodrow Park (Sears Hill) - approximately five acres and is located in the Sears Hill District of Staunton. The park was named in honor of President Woodrow Wilson and features a scenic overlook of historic downtown Staunton.

== Government ==
United States presidential election results for Staunton, Virginia
Year	Republican		Democratic		Third party(ies)	
Year	No.	%	No.	%	No.	%
1880	361	31.61%	781	68.39%	0	0.00%
1884	499	38.38%	771	59.31%	30	2.31%
1888	161	60.30%	101	37.83%	5	1.87%
1892	549	35.17%	919	58.87%	93	5.96%
1896	556	39.63%	713	50.82%	134	9.55%
1900	375	35.48%	612	57.90%	70	6.62%
1904	162	24.92%	458	70.46%	30	4.62%
1908	347	37.76%	514	55.93%	58	6.31%
1912	65	6.61%	632	64.23%	287	29.17%
1916	311	37.33%	511	61.34%	11	1.32%
1920	705	42.86%	931	56.60%	9	0.55%
1924	549	34.12%	1,022	63.52%	38	2.36%
1928	1,026	58.33%	733	41.67%	0	0.00%
1932	551	35.43%	988	63.54%	16	1.03%
1936	568	34.05%	1,091	65.41%	9	0.54%
1940	687	39.39%	1,042	59.75%	15	0.86%
1944	847	42.10%	1,159	57.60%	6	0.30%
1948	1,323	49.49%	914	34.19%	436	16.31%
1952	2,578	73.07%	945	26.79%	5	0.14%
1956	2,908	74.93%	843	21.72%	130	3.35%
1960	2,789	69.17%	1,233	30.58%	10	0.25%
1964	2,969	52.27%	2,705	47.62%	6	0.11%
1968	4,434	61.40%	1,729	23.94%	1,058	14.65%
1972	5,531	78.25%	1,416	20.03%	121	1.71%
1976	4,681	59.53%	2,951	37.53%	231	2.94%
1980	4,819	60.79%	2,658	33.53%	450	5.68%
1984	6,137	74.88%	2,012	24.55%	47	0.57%
1988	5,775	69.29%	2,457	29.48%	102	1.22%
1992	4,989	54.04%	2,851	30.88%	1,392	15.08%
1996	4,526	53.66%	3,162	37.49%	747	8.86%
2000	4,878	57.29%	3,324	39.04%	312	3.66%
2004	5,805	60.29%	3,756	39.01%	68	0.71%
2008	5,330	48.39%	5,569	50.56%	116	1.05%
2012	5,272	47.03%	5,728	51.10%	210	1.87%
2016	5,133	45.61%	5,333	47.38%	789	7.01%
2020	5,695	43.84%	6,981	53.74%	314	2.42%
2024	5,778	42.40%	7,592	55.72%	256	1.88%

Staunton operates under a council-manager form of government. In 1908, Staunton was the first city in the United States to give an appointed employee authority over city affairs through statute. In 1912, Sumter, South Carolina, was the first U.S. city to implement the council-manager form of city government. The city of Staunton refers to itself on its website as the "birthplace of President Woodrow Wilson, and the city manager form of government."

The Shenandoah Valley was one of the first areas of the South to break away from a Solid South voting pattern, and Staunton was no exception. It went Republican in every presidential election from 1948 to 2004. In 2008, however, Barack Obama narrowly carried the city, becoming the first Democrat to do so since Franklin D. Roosevelt's last victory in 1944. Democrats have won every national and state election in Staunton since then. In 2024, Staunton became one of the few counties or county-equivalents to shift left despite the decisive loss of Kamala Harris; it voted for her by a double-digit margin, the first time it did so for a Democrat since 1944.

Staunton is part of Virginia's 6th congressional district.

== Education ==
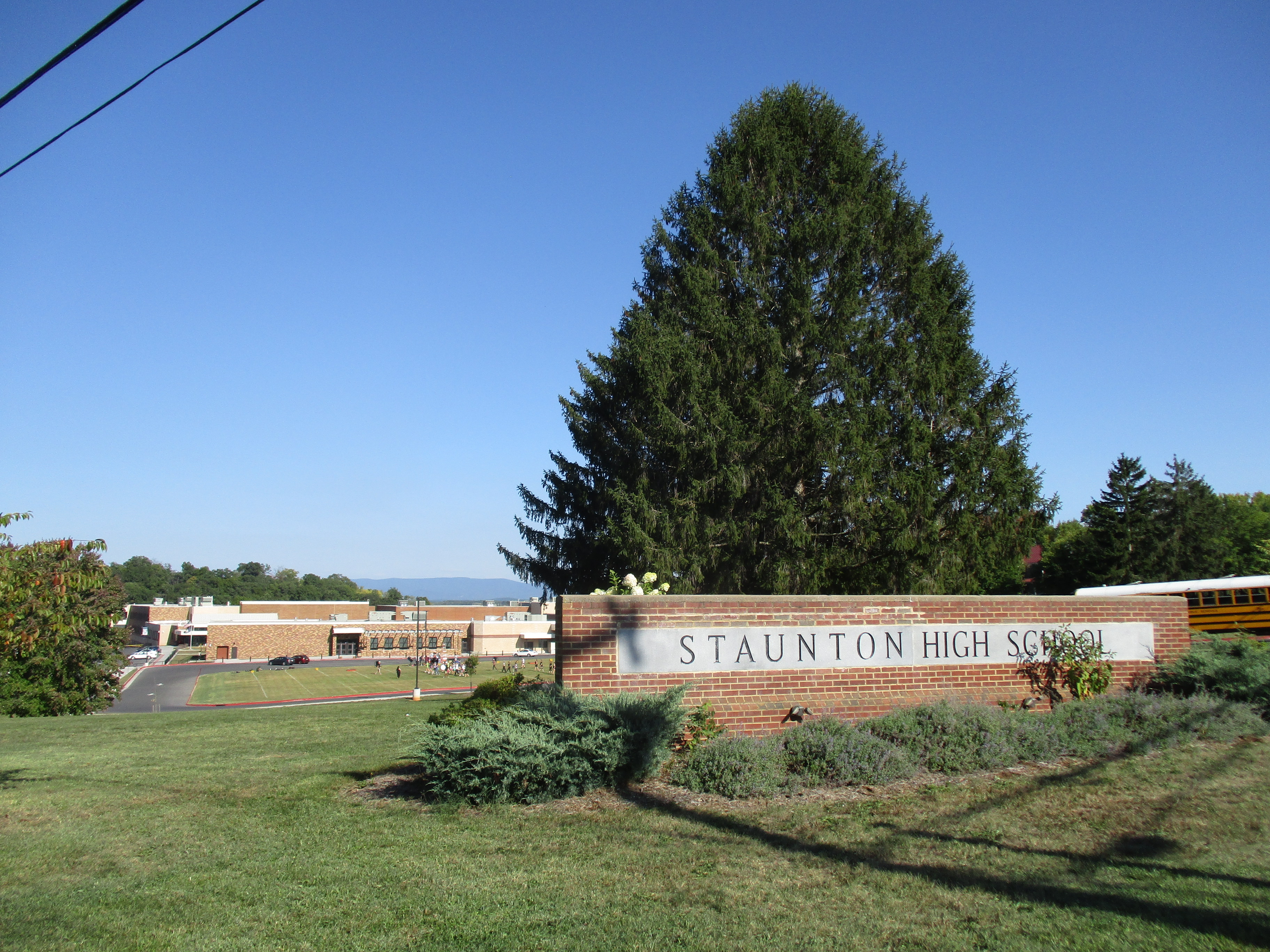
Staunton High School

Staunton City Schools is the school district of the city.

Black Virginians were largely barred from education until Reconstruction. The first school in Staunton which allowed African-Americans to attend was established by the Freedmen's Bureau under the supervision of the commanding general of the occupying Union army in late 1865. Arrangements were made to bring in women from the North as teachers, and the jury rooms of the Augusta County Courthouse, located at 1 E. Johnson Street, were to be used as classrooms. The court protested this plan, however, and it is possible that another location was found.

In 1964 the Staunton chapter of the NAACP threatened the city with a lawsuit if they did not immediately desegregate the public schools. The City School Board, headed by Thomas W. Dixon, declined to take further action, contending that the schools were already desegregated as ten black children had been allowed to attend previously all-white schools. Attorneys for the city of Staunton submitted a plan for the desegregation of its public schools in 1965 by eliminating all negro schools in time for the 1967–1968 school year, which was approved by the Department of Health, Education and Welfare. However, the implementation of this plan was delayed to such an extent that a group of African-American parents brought suit in the United States District Court for the Western District of Virginia against the city. This case, Bell v. School Board of Staunton, was decided on January 5, 1966, with the court stating that the delay was a violation of the rights of the students under the Fourteenth Amendment and ordering that the schools and their faculty be desegregated in time for the 1966–1967 school year.

The Staunton city school district was one of 21 in Virginia which take elementary school students out of class for Bible lessons on a voluntary basis, a practice known as Weekday Religious Education. Although the U.S. Supreme Court ended taxpayer-funded religious education in 1948 in McCollum v. Board of Education, four years later they opened the door to privately funded voluntary classes held during school hours but away from school premises in Zorach v. Clauson. In 2005, a group of parents in Staunton asked the school board to halt the practice. The challenge was successful, and the Bible classes are no longer being taught as of April 2017.

=== Public ===
District schools:

- T.C. McSwain Elementary School
- A.R. Ware Elementary School
- Bessie Weller Elementary School
- Shelburne Middle School
- Staunton High School
- Dixon Educational Center (includes Genesis Alternative Education Program)

State-operated:

- Virginia School for the Deaf and Blind

=== Private ===
- Stuart Hall School—preparatory school (boarding for coed, day school for coed)
- Grace Christian School—Coed Christian School for Pre-K to 12th Grade
- C. F. Richards Jr. Academy—coed Seventh-Day Adventist school
- Mary Baldwin University—Private liberal arts college, formerly a women's college
- Raw Learning—democratic/free school

Former:

- Staunton Military Academy

== Media ==
- The News Leader, local newspaper. Owned by the Gannett Company.
- WHSV—ABC affiliate in Harrisonburg
- WKDW-AM—Clear Channel Communications
- WQSV-LP—Community radio station

== Infrastructure ==
=== Transportation ===
==== Roads and highways ====
The main highways through Staunton include U.S. Route 11, U.S. Route 11 Business, U.S. Route 250, Virginia State Route 252, Virginia State Route 254, Virginia State Route 261 and Virginia State Route 262. U.S. Route 11 and U.S. Route 250 are the most prominent roads passing directly through Staunton, with US 11 following a northeast to southwest alignment (but signed north–south), and US 250 following a northwest to southeast alignment (but signed east–west). US 11 Business follows a slower route through downtown compared to the main US 11 routing which passes just outside downtown. State Routes 252 and 254 are minor roads leading to nearby rural areas of adjacent Augusta County. State Route 261 provides a better route for trucks following US 11 and US 250 through the city. State Route 262 forms a limited access beltway around the outskirts of Staunton. Interstate 64 and Interstate 81 both pass just outside the city limits and provide the main high-speed, high-volume roads to the Staunton region.

==== Public transportation ====
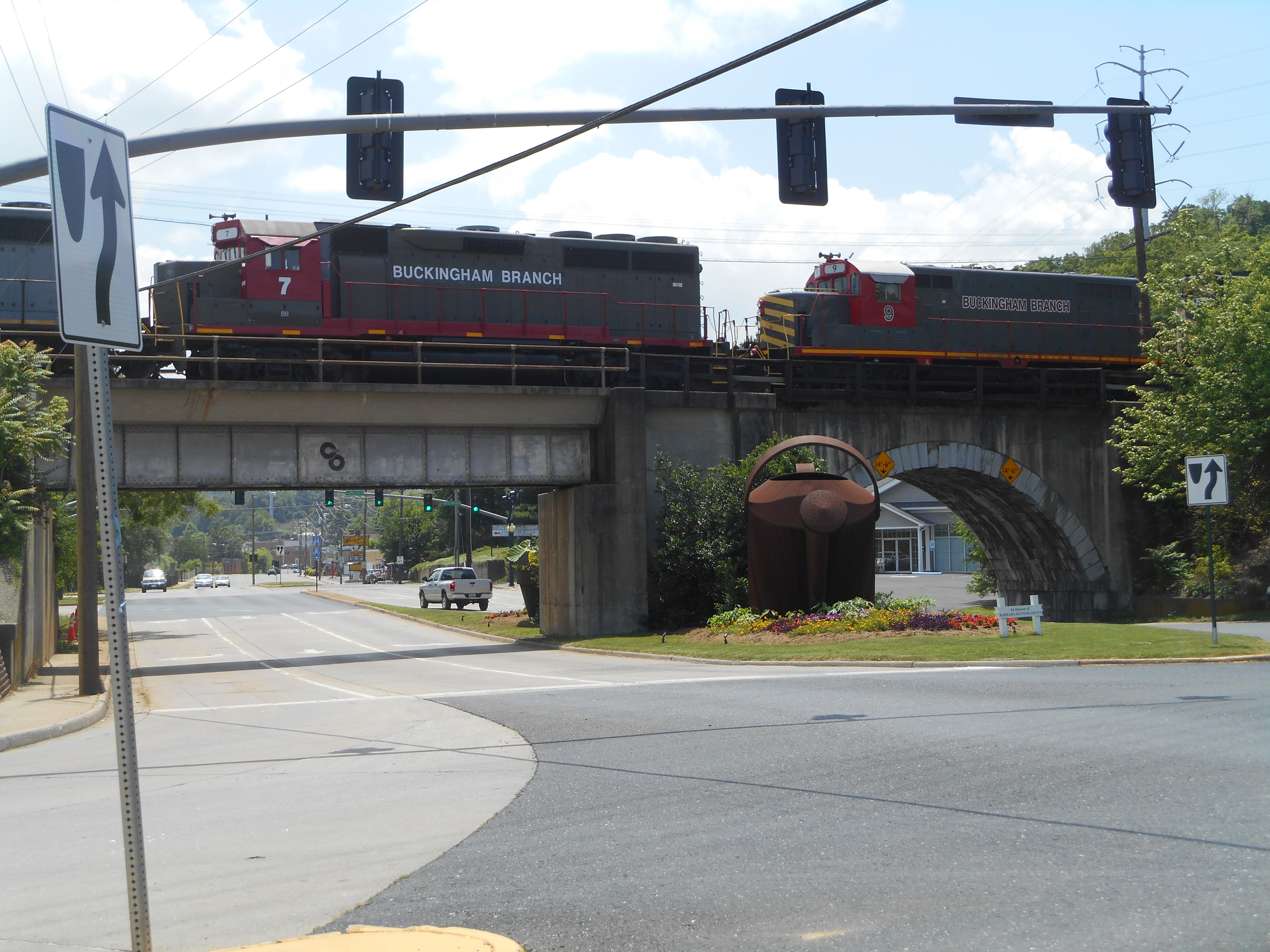
Big Watering Can with Buckingham Branch locomotives

Staunton is served by Amtrak's Cardinal. The train station, which is located downtown, is the closest station to the nearby cities of Harrisonburg and Lexington. The Buckingham Branch also has a small railyard.

Staunton had a municipal bus system during the 20th century, known as the Staunton Transit Service, but it was dissolved in 1989. In 1944, World War II veteran S. Melvin Johnson wrote to Truman Gibson, assistant to William H. Hastie, advisor to Secretary of War Henry L. Stimson, regarding segregated seating on the Staunton Transit Service and stating that returning African-American soldiers would not stand for such conditions. This letter was an indication of the role that African-American veterans would later play in the American civil rights movement. In 1946, after the United States Supreme Court decision Irene Morgan v. Commonwealth of Virginia, which found that Virginia's segregated seating law was unconstitutional with respect to interstate bus routes, Ethel New, a black woman from Lynch, Kentucky, was arrested for violating the law because she had purchased an intrastate ticket. New suffered a miscarriage subsequent to her arrest and sued Greyhound Lines and the arresting officer in Staunton. In September 1947, meeting in Staunton, the Virginia Supreme Court of Appeals upheld the all-white jury's verdict exonerating both the bus line and the officer.

Blue Ridge Intercity Transit Express (BRITE) provides fixed-route transit bus service in Staunton on three routes: the Downtown Trolley, West Route, and North Route. The Coordinated Area Transportation Services (CATS) operates a demand-response service throughout the Staunton area, as well as a fixed shuttle service between the downtown areas of Staunton and Waynesboro. Virginia Breeze provides intercity bus service between Blacksburg and Washington, with a stop in Staunton.

The city is adjacent to the northernmost junction of I-81 and I-64. Virginia State Route 262 forms a partial beltway around the city, and both US 250 and US 11 pass through the city.

The nearest commercial airport is Shenandoah Valley Regional Airport in Weyers Cave, Virginia.

=== Health care ===
- Commonwealth Center for Children and Adolescents (formerly the DeJarnette Center after eugenicist Joseph DeJarnette) psychiatric facility
- Western State Hospital, psychiatric facility

== Notable people ==
- Diana Adams, dancer
- Charles W. Anderson, awarded the Medal of Honor
- John Brown Baldwin, legislator
- Mary Julia Baldwin, educator
- Phil Balsley, baritone singer for The Statler Brothers
- Randolph C. Berkeley, major general in the United States Marine Corps and a Medal of Honor recipient
- Larry Boerner, baseball pitcher
- Allen Caperton Braxton, segregationist and Staunton representative to the revanchist Virginia state constitutional convention of 1902
- Willis McGlascoe Carter, educator, newspaper editor, and civil rights activist.
- John Breckinridge, senator and attorney general
- James Brown, 1st Secretary of State of Kentucky, U.S. Senator from Louisiana, U.S. Minister to France.
- Joseph Calhoun, congressman
- William Christian, soldier and politician
- Gertrude Harris Boatwright Claytor, poet
- George M. Cochran, Virginia Supreme Court justice
- John E. Colhoun, senator and lawyer
- Francis Collins, director of the National Institutes of Health
- Joseph DeJarnette, psychiatrist and eugenicist
- Lew DeWitt, tenor singer for The Statler Brothers
- Joseph W. Fifer (1840–1938), served as the 19th Governor of Illinois from 1889 to 1893.
- Dave Fultz, baseball center fielder
- Armistead C. Gordon, author, professor of English at the University of Virginia
- William Haines, film actor and interior designer
- Wade H. Haislip, United States Army general
- Emmett Hanger, politician
- Kenton Harper, printer, soldier and politician
- George Moffett Harrison, judge
- Alexander Hart, Confederate States Army major
- John N. Hendren, judge and Treasurer of the Confederate States of America
- Henry W. Holt, Chief Justice of the Virginia Supreme Court of Appeals
- Thomas D. Howie, teacher and military officer
- Alexander Humphreys, physician
- Parry Wayne Humphreys, congressman
- Carroll Knicely, editor and publisher
- Shannon Lucas, drummer
- Sampson Mathews, soldier and politician
- Jerry May, baseball catcher for the Pittsburgh Pirates and Kansas City Royals
- Samuel Augustus Merritt, delegate and judge
- Perry L. Miles, U.S. Army brigadier general
- Charles R. Miller, U.S. Army major general
- James Coffield Mitchell, congressman
- Samuel Morgan, businessman, builder and manufacturer
- Ethel Moses, actress and dancer
- Eustace Mullins, American white supremacist
- Wilton Persons, chief assistant to Dwight D. Eisenhower and superintendent of Staunton Military Academy
- Louise M. Powell, American nurse and educator, led the University of Minnesota School of Nursing during its formative years
- Don Reid, lead singer and songwriter for The Statler Brothers
- Harold Reid, bass singer for The Statler Brothers
- Tony Schiavone, Commentator for All Elite Wrestling (AEW)
- Larry Sheets, baseball outfielder and designated hitter
- Mark Shue, musician, Guided by Voices
- John B. Stephenson, sociologist
- Alexander Hugh Holmes Stuart, congressman, secretary of the interior, and chairman of the Committee of Nine
- Jacob Swoope, politician
- Malfourd W. Trumbo, politician and judge
- A. J. Turner, teacher of music, first director of Stonewall Brigade Band
- Thomas Wilson, congressman
- Woodrow Wilson, 28th President of the United States
- Larry Woodall, baseball catcher
- Jacob Yost, congressman

=== Sister cities ===
- Vişeu de Sus, Romania
- Dabas, Hungary

== See also ==
- National Register of Historic Places listings in Staunton, Virginia
