= National Register of Historic Places listings in Staunton, Virginia =

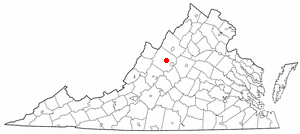
Location of Staunton in Virginia

This is a list of the National Register of Historic Places listings in Staunton, Virginia.

This is intended to be a complete list of the properties and districts on the National Register of Historic Places in the independent city of Staunton, Virginia, United States. The locations of National Register properties and districts for which the latitude and longitude coordinates are included below, may be seen in an online map.

There are 37 properties and districts listed on the National Register in the city, including 1 National Historic Landmark.

This National Park Service list is complete through NPS recent listings posted April 24, 2026.

== Current listings ==
| | Name on the Register | Image | Date listed | Location | Description |
|---|---|---|---|---|---|
| 1 | Augusta County Courthouse | Augusta County Courthouse | October 26, 1982 (#82001826) | 1 E. Johnson St. 38°08′56″N 79°04′20″W | |
| 2 | Mary Baldwin College, Main Building | Mary Baldwin College, Main Building | July 26, 1973 (#73002227) | Mary Baldwin University campus 38°09′04″N 79°04′17″W | |
| 3 | Beverley Historic District | Beverley Historic District | July 14, 1982 (#82004598) | U.S. Route 250 and State Route 254; 38°08′57″N 79°04′22″W | |
| 4 | Breezy Hill | Breezy Hill | July 8, 1982 (#82004599) | 1220 N. Augusta St. 38°09′37″N 79°04′10″W | |
| 5 | Catlett House | Catlett House | July 15, 1982 (#82004600) | 303 Berkeley Pl. 38°09′03″N 79°04′06″W | |
| 6 | Cobble Hill Farm | Cobble Hill Farm | February 25, 2004 (#04000105) | 101 Woodlee Rd. 38°10′20″N 79°03′53″W | |
| 7 | Fairview Cemetery | | August 13, 2025 (#100012124) | 11 Lambert Street; 38°09′53″N 79°04′05″W | |
| 8 | Goodloe House | | November 10, 2022 (#100008392) | 25 Ridgeview Rd. 38°09′40″N 79°04′00″W | |
| 9 | Gospel Hill Historic District | Gospel Hill Historic District | February 14, 1985 (#85000299) | Roughly bounded by E. Beverly, N. Market, E. Frederick, and Kalorama Sts. 38°09′06″N 79°04′01″W | |
| 10 | Hilltop | Hilltop | June 19, 1979 (#79003298) | Mary Baldwin University campus 38°09′07″N 79°04′17″W | |
| 11 | Arista Hoge House | Arista Hoge House | July 15, 1982 (#82004601) | 215 Kalorama St. 38°08′55″N 79°04′11″W | |
| 12 | Kable House | Kable House | June 19, 1979 (#79003299) | 310 Prospect St. 38°09′15″N 79°04′09″W | |
| 13 | Robert E. Lee High School | Robert E. Lee High School | March 10, 2009 (#09000122) | 274 Churchville Ave. 38°09′25″N 79°04′40″W | |
| 14 | J.C.M. Merrillat House | J.C.M. Merrillat House | September 16, 1982 (#82004602) | 521 E. Beverley St. 38°09′09″N 79°03′55″W | |
| 15 | Thomas J. Michie House | Thomas J. Michie House | September 9, 1982 (#82004603) | 324 E. Beverley St. 38°08′59″N 79°04′03″W | |
| 16 | C.W. Miller House | C.W. Miller House | June 19, 1979 (#79003300) | 210 N. New St. 38°09′07″N 79°04′20″W | |
| 17 | Montgomery Hall Park | Montgomery Hall Park | February 15, 2018 (#100002139) | 1000 Montgomery Ave. 38°08′44″N 79°05′30″W | |
| 18 | National Valley Bank | National Valley Bank | June 19, 1979 (#79003301) | 12-14 W. Beverly St. 38°08′58″N 79°04′23″W | |
| 19 | Newtown Historic District | Newtown Historic District | September 8, 1983 (#83003318) | Roughly bounded by Lewis St. and S. Jefferson Sts., the former Chesapeake and Ohio railroad line, and Allegheny and Churchville Aves., including Thornrose Cemetery; 38°09′00″N 79°04′40″W | |
| 20 | Oakdene | Oakdene | November 24, 1982 (#82001827) | 605 E. Beverley St. 38°09′08″N 79°03′52″W | |
| 21 | The Oaks | The Oaks | June 19, 1979 (#79003302) | 437 E. Beverly St. 38°09′06″N 79°03′58″W | |
| 22 | Old Main | Old Main | August 13, 1974 (#74002246) | 235 W. Frederick St. 38°09′02″N 79°04′36″W | |
| 23 | Rose Terrace | Rose Terrace | June 19, 1979 (#79003303) | 150 N. Market St. 38°09′08″N 79°04′16″W | |
| 24 | Sears House | Sears House | February 23, 1972 (#72001530) | Sears Hill Rd. in Woodrow Wilson City Park; 38°08′45″N 79°04′20″W | |
| 25 | Staunton Coca-Cola Bottling Works | Staunton Coca-Cola Bottling Works | August 19, 2024 (#100010736) | 709 North Augusta Street; 38°09′22″N 79°04′21″W | |
| 26 | Staunton National Cemetery | Staunton National Cemetery | February 26, 1996 (#96000034) | 901 Richmond Ave. 38°08′25″N 79°02′59″W | |
| 27 | Staunton Steam Laundry | | August 18, 2022 (#100008023) | 110 West Hampton, 709 Hall, and 710 Robertson Sts. 38°08′36″N 79°04′32″W | |
| 28 | Steephill | Steephill | February 23, 1984 (#84003599) | 200 Park Boulevard; 38°09′22″N 79°05′16″W | |
| 29 | Stuart Addition Historic District | Stuart Addition Historic District | May 3, 1984 (#84003604) | Roughly bounded by Augusta, Sunnyside, Market, and New Sts. 38°09′11″N 79°04′19″W | |
| 30 | Stuart House | Stuart House | May 5, 1972 (#72001531) | 120 Church St. 38°08′51″N 79°04′33″W | |
| 31 | Trinity Episcopal Church | Trinity Episcopal Church | May 5, 1972 (#72001532) | Beverley and Lewis Sts. 38°08′56″N 79°04′31″W | |
| 32 | Virginia School for the Deaf and the Blind | Virginia School for the Deaf and the Blind | November 12, 1969 (#69000361) | E. Beverly St. and Pleasant Terrace; 38°09′02″N 79°03′50″W | |
| 33 | Booker T. Washington High School | Booker T. Washington High School | September 3, 2014 (#14000550) | 1114 W. Johnson St. 38°08′51″N 79°04′54″W | |
| 34 | Waverly Hill | Waverly Hill | July 8, 1982 (#82004604) | 3001 N. Augusta St. 38°10′10″N 79°02′40″W | |
| 35 | Western State Hospital Complex | Western State Hospital Complex | November 25, 1969 (#69000362) | Junction of U.S. Routes 11 and 250; also 301 Greenville Ave. and the southeastern corner of the junction of U.S. Routes 11 and 250; 38°08′42″N 79°04′02″W | Boundaries repeatedly increased at 301 Greenville Ave., on February 21, 2007, July 24, 2007, and March 23, 2010 |
| 36 | Wharf Area Historic District | Wharf Area Historic District | November 9, 1972 (#72001533) | Middlebrook Ave. between S. New and S. Lewis Sts., including S. Augusta St. to Johnson St.; also east to Lewis Creek; 38°08′51″N 79°04′23″W | Lewis Creek represents a boundary increase of July 19, 1982 |
| 37 | Woodrow Wilson Birthplace | Woodrow Wilson Birthplace | October 15, 1966 (#66000926) | N. Coalter St. between Beverly and Frederick Sts. 38°09′02″N 79°04′08″W | |

== See also ==
- List of National Historic Landmarks in Virginia
- National Register of Historic Places listings in Virginia
- National Register of Historic Places listings in Augusta County, Virginia
