= T. J. Collins =

American architect

Thomas Jasper Collins (August 2, 1844 - October 6, 1925), commonly known as T. J. Collins, was an American architect. He served in the Union Army during the American Civil War and later became an architect, practicing first in Washington, D.C., before moving to Staunton, Virginia in 1890. His firm became T. J. Collins & Sons which continued to operate in the 1990s under the management of Collins' grandson. He is credited with the design of numerous courthouses in Virginia and over 200 buildings in Staunton from 1891 to 1911. T.J. Collins retired in 1911; the firm was then run by his sons William and Samuel Collins.

A number of Collins' and the firm's works are listed on the National Register of Historic Places.

Works include:

- Augusta County Courthouse, 1 E. Johnson St., Staunton, Virginia (Collins, T. J.), NRHP-listed
- Augusta Military Academy, N of Staunton on U.S. 11, Fort Defiance, Virginia (Collins, T. J.), NRHP-listed
- 1921 expansion of Augusta Stone Church, N of Staunton on U.S. 11, Fort Defiance, Virginia (Collins, T. J.), NRHP-listed
- Bath County Courthouse, built 1913–14, across the road to the north of Oakley Farm
- Beverley Historic District, U.S. 250 and VA 254, Staunton, Virginia (Collins, T. J.), NRHP-listed
- Breezy Hill, 1220 N. Augusta St., Staunton, Virginia (Collins, T. J.), NRHP-listed
- Cobble Hill Farm, 101 Woodlee Rd., Staunton, Virginia (Collins, T. J. and Sons), NRHP-listed
- Fishburne Military School, 225 S. Wayne Ave., Waynesboro, Virginia (Collins, T. J., & Sons), NRHP-listed
- Gospel Hill Historic District, Roughly bounded by E. Beverly, N. Market, E. Frederick and Kalorama Sts., Staunton, Virginia (Collins, T. J. & Son), NRHP-listed
- Arista Hoge House, 215 Kalorama St., Staunton, Virginia (Collins & Hackett), NRHP-listed
- Kable House, 310 Prospect St., Staunton, Virginia (Collins, T. J. & Son), NRHP-listed
- C. W. Miller House, 210 N. New St., Staunton, Virginia (Collins, T. J.), NRHP-listed
- National Valley Bank, 12-14 W. Beverly St., Staunton, Virginia (Collins, T. J. & Son), NRHP-listed
- Oakley Farm, 1921-22 remodelling to Colonial Revival style, 11865 Sam Snead Highway (US 220) Warm Springs, Virginia (Collins, T. J. & Sons), NRHP-listed
- Rockingham County Courthouse, Courthouse Square Harrisonburg, Virginia (Collins, T. J.), NRHP-listed
- Staunton station of the Chesapeake and Ohio Railway, Middlebrook Avenue, Staunton, Virginia.
