= Catlett House =

Catlett House may refer to:

- Catlett House (Catlettsburg, Kentucky), listed on the National Register of Historic Places in Boyd County, Kentucky
- Catlett House (Staunton, Virginia), listed on the National Register of Historic Places in Staunton, Virginia
