= Temple House of Israel =

Jewish congregation in Staunton, Virginia, USA

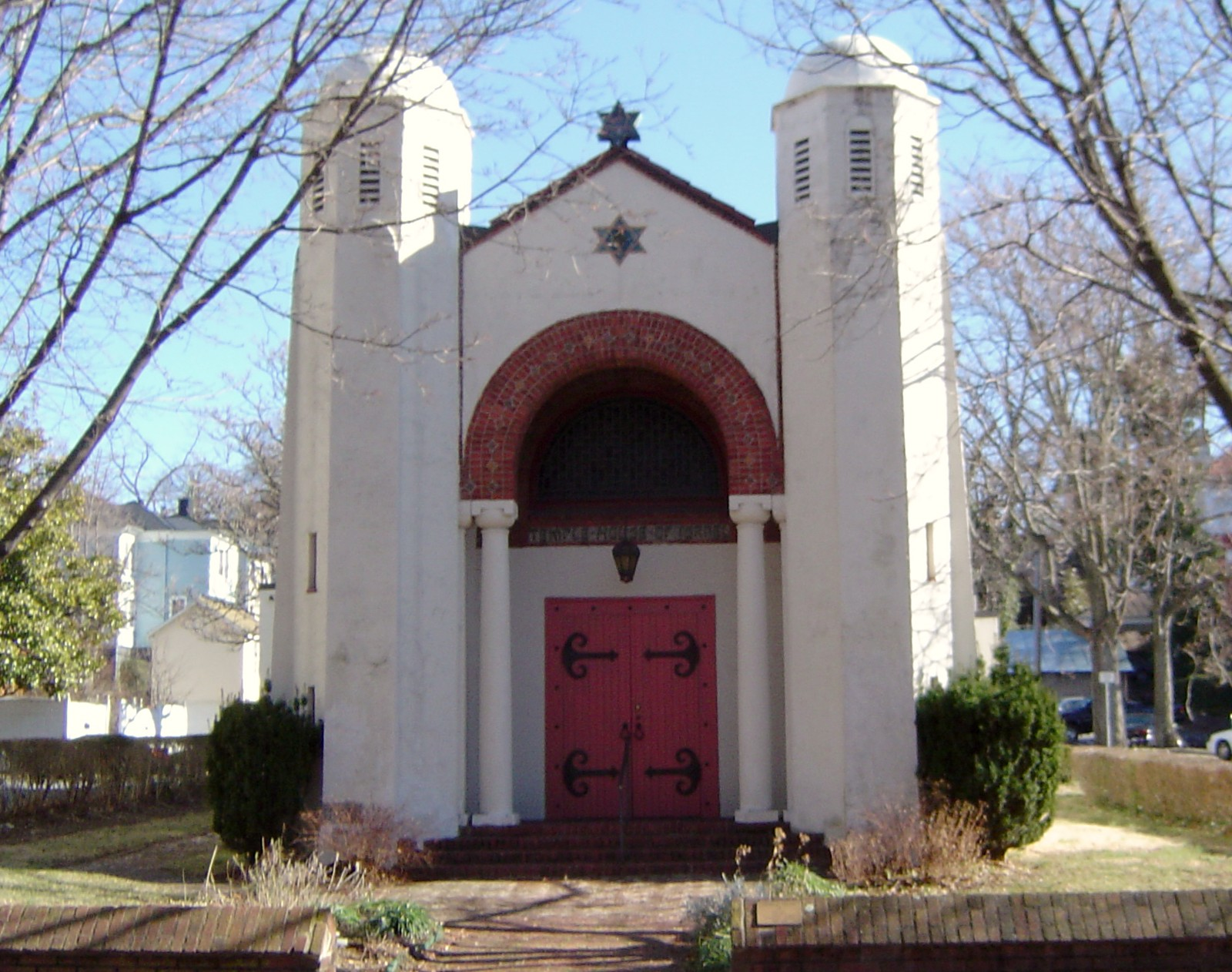
- Temple House of Israel synagogue

- Location in Virginia

Religion
- Affiliation: Reform Judaism
- Ecclesiastical or organizational status: Synagogue
- Leadership: Rabbi Randi Nagel
- Status: Active
- Religious features: Charles Connick glass screen

Location
- Location: 15 North Market Street, Staunton, Virginia
- Country: United States
- Interactive map of Temple House of Israel
- Coordinates: 38°09′17″N 79°04′16″W

Architecture
- Architects: Sam Collins of; T.J. Collins & Sons
- Type: Synagogue
- Style: Moorish Revival
- Founder: Major Alexander Hart
- Established: 1876 (as a congregation)
- Completed: 1925
- Materials: Mercer tiles

Website
- thoi.org
- Temple House of Israel
- U.S. Historic district – Contributing property
- Part of: Gospel Hill Historic District (ID85000299)
- Designated CP: February 14, 1985

Temple House of Israel is a Reform Jewish congregation and synagogue located at 15 North Market Street, in Staunton, Virginia, in the United States. Founded in 1876 by Major Alexander Hart, it originally held services in members' homes, then moved to a building on Kalorama street in 1885, the year it joined the Union for Reform Judaism.

In 1925 the congregation constructed its current building at 15 North Market Street, a contributing property to the Gospel Hill historic district. The Moorish Revival structure was designed by Sam Collins of T.J. Collins and son, and includes Mercer tiles, and windows and a glass screen by Charles Connick of Boston.

As of 2019, Rabbi Randi Nagel served Temple House of Israel as rabbi.

== Early history ==
Temple House of Israel was founded in 1876 in Staunton, Virginia by Major Alexander Hart, who had fought for the Confederate States of America in the American Civil War. Hart served as the congregation's president and minister until at least 1893.

Services were held in members' homes for more than eight years. In 1884 the congregation acquired the Hoover School building at 200 Kalorama Street, at the corner of Market Street, and in February 1885 began holding services there. The building still stands, diagonally opposite the Hotel 24 South. That same year the synagogue joined the Union of American Hebrew Congregations (now the Union for Reform Judaism).

The congregation purchased land north of Staunton for a cemetery in 1886, and held its first burial there in 1887. The cemetery, on North Augusta Street between Woodland Drive and Lee Street, is still used for burials today.

At the turn of the 20th century, House of Israel had no rabbi, but held services twice a week, Friday nights from 8:00 to 9:00 pm, and Saturday from 10:30 to 11:30 am. The congregation also ran a religious school. By 1907 Staunton's Jewish population was an estimated 40 people. House of Israel had fifteen member families, and still held services twice a week. However, the congregation still had no rabbi, and the religious school no longer functioned.

Fannie Barth Strauss, instructor and later assistant professor of Latin and German at Mary Baldwin College from 1918 to 1954, re-established the Hebrew school at House of Israel in 1916. In 1919, though the synagogue still had no rabbi, the school held classes once a week, and had two teachers and twelve students. Strauss would serve as the school's principal from its re-establishment until at least 1964, and also served as the synagogue's treasurer from 1946 until at least 1964.

== Move to Market Street ==
By 1924 the congregation had outgrown its Kalorama Street building, and it purchased a lot at 115 North Market Street from Mary Baldwin College for $7,150 (today $134,000). Sam Collins of T.J. Collins and son designed a new Moorish Revival building there, constructed at a cost of $17,000 (today $312,000).

The one-story stucco building had a twin gable roof with 3 bays. Decorated with "Early Assyrian motifs", the facade presented "[f]lanking twin towers with suppressed buttresses", and a "[l]arge arched opening in [the] central bay, supported by unusual columns", and included Mercer tiles. All the windows, and a glass screen, were created by Charles Jay Connick of Boston, who also created famous windows for a number of religious buildings, including the rose windows of St. Patrick's Cathedral and the Cathedral of Saint John the Divine in New York City. The windows (sixteen in total) and screen cost $700 (today $13,000), and featured fruits or plants grown in the Land of Israel, including "olives, grapes, citron, pomegranate, and others".

In 1947, a kitchen and small social hall were constructed at the back of the building, and a south bay was added to the sanctuary; Sam Collins was again the architect. To provide more room for the religious school, the social hall was expanded in 1965. The building was a contributing property to the successful 1984 National Register of Historic Places nomination of Gospel Hill as a historic district.

During the early 1970s, Frank M. Waldorf was the congregation's rabbi. He went on to serve for 30 years as rabbi at Temple Sinai in Brookline, Massachusetts. After Waldorf, Temple House of Israel entered into a "joint rabbi" arrangement with Congregation Beth El of Harrisonburg, Virginia, where rabbis would serve for two-thirds of their time at Beth El, and the rest at House of Israel. The first rabbi hired under this arrangement was Robert Kraus (also in the early 1970s).

== 1980s to present ==
The congregation remained small; in 1983, membership was only 28 families. That year Douglas D. Weber was hired as rabbi of both Temple House of Israel and Beth El, and the "joint rabbi" arrangement became "permanent". From 1984 to 1988 Lynne Landsberg filled that role. The 30th female rabbinic graduate of the Union for Reform Judaism, she had previously served as student rabbi at Temple House of Israel from 1979 to 1981, then as associate rabbi of Manhattan's Central Synagogue until 1984. She subsequently took on a number of roles at the Union for Reform Judaism, and, after a serious and disabling accident in 1999, became the senior adviser on disability issues at the Religious Action Center for Reform Judaism.

Rabbis Daniel Fink and Laura Rappaport jointly led Temple House of Israel and Beth El from 1988 to 1992. During the 1990s the two congregations were served by Jonathan Biatch, then Jacqueline Romm Satlow, followed, from 1997 to 2003, by Ariel J. Friedlander as rabbi.

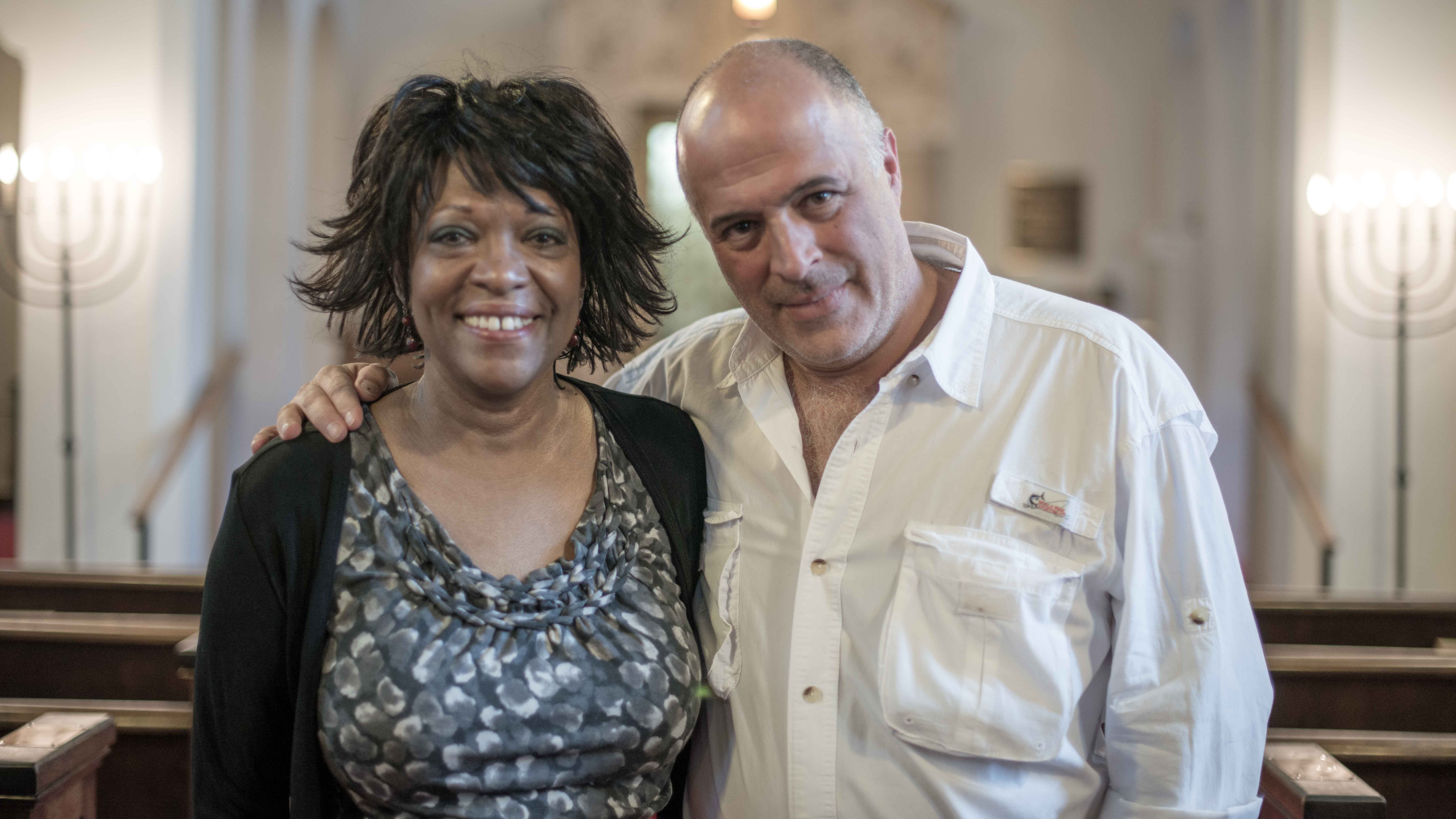
Rita Dove and Eduardo Montes-Bradley in the Temple House of Israel sanctuary for the filming of Rita Dove: An American Poet

In 2003, Joe Blair became the rabbi of Temple House of Israel and Beth El; the two congregations combined had 120 member families. Blair received B.A. and Master of Computer Science degrees from the University of Virginia, and a Juris Doctor from The College of William & Mary Law School. After working in the computer field for 15 years, and briefly as a general practice attorney, he returned to school, attending the Reconstructionist Rabbinical College, from which he graduated with a Masters in Hebrew Letters in 1996. In 2004 he was appointed an adjunct professor of religion at Mary Baldwin College. A member of Toastmasters International, to which he attributed his speaking abilities, he also moderated a conversion forum on Jewish.com. In 2008 Blair was one of 18 rabbis chosen nationally to participate in the Synagogues: Transformation and Renewal elite training program. Blair left Temple House of Israel in 2018, to become the rabbi of Temple Israel of Charleston, West Virginia.

Peter Grumbacher joined as part-time interim rabbi in 2018. After receiving his ordination from Hebrew Union College-Jewish Institute of Religion in 1972, he served as full-time rabbi of Congregation Beth Emeth in Wilmington, Delaware until his retirement in 2009, and subsequently as interim rabbi of Beth El Congregation in Winchester, Virginia. Rabbi Randi Nagel was elected as Rabbi of the congregation in 2019.

== On film ==
Temple House of Israel served as a location for the documentary film Rita Dove: An American Poet produced by Heritage Film Project. Filming took place in December 2013.
