= Oakdene =

Oakdene may refer to:

- Oakdene (Baltimore, Maryland), part of the Green Spring Valley Historic District in Baltimore County, Maryland, U.S.
- Oakdene (Staunton, Virginia), a historic home listed on the NHRP in Virginia
- Oakdene, Gauteng, a suburb of Johannesburg, South Africa
- Oakdene Place, listed on the NRHP in Floyd County, Georgia, U.S.
- SS Oakdene, a 1942 coaster
