= Cornelius T. Jordan =

American politician

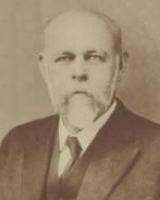

Member of the Virginia Senate from the 9th district
- In office January 12, 1916 – January 14, 1920
- Preceded by: William H. Landes
- Succeeded by: F. Percy Loth

Personal details
- Born: Cornelius Theodore Jordan; December 30, 1855 Salem, Virginia, U.S.
- Died: January 28, 1924 (aged 68) Miami, Florida, U.S.
- Party: Independent
- Spouse: Mary Moser
- Education: Roanoke College

Cornelius Theodore Jordan (December 30, 1855 – January 28, 1924) was an American educator and politician who served as a member of the Virginia Senate, representing the state's 9th district. In 1915, he ran for Senate as an independent, defeating Democratic incumbent William H. Landes. After caucusing with the chamber's Democrats during his four-year term, he won the party's nomination in 1919 but was bested in the general election by Independent F. Percy Loth. From 1896 to 1899, he was the President of New Mexico College of Agriculture and Mechanic Arts, which would later become New Mexico State University.

Academic offices
| Preceded by Samuel P. McCrea | President of New Mexico State University; 1896–1899 | Succeeded by Frederic W. Sanders |
Senate of Virginia
| Preceded by William H. Landes | Virginia Senator for the 9th District; 1916–1920 | Succeeded by F. Percy Loth |
