= Woodrow Wilson Presidential Library =

Library and museum in Virginia

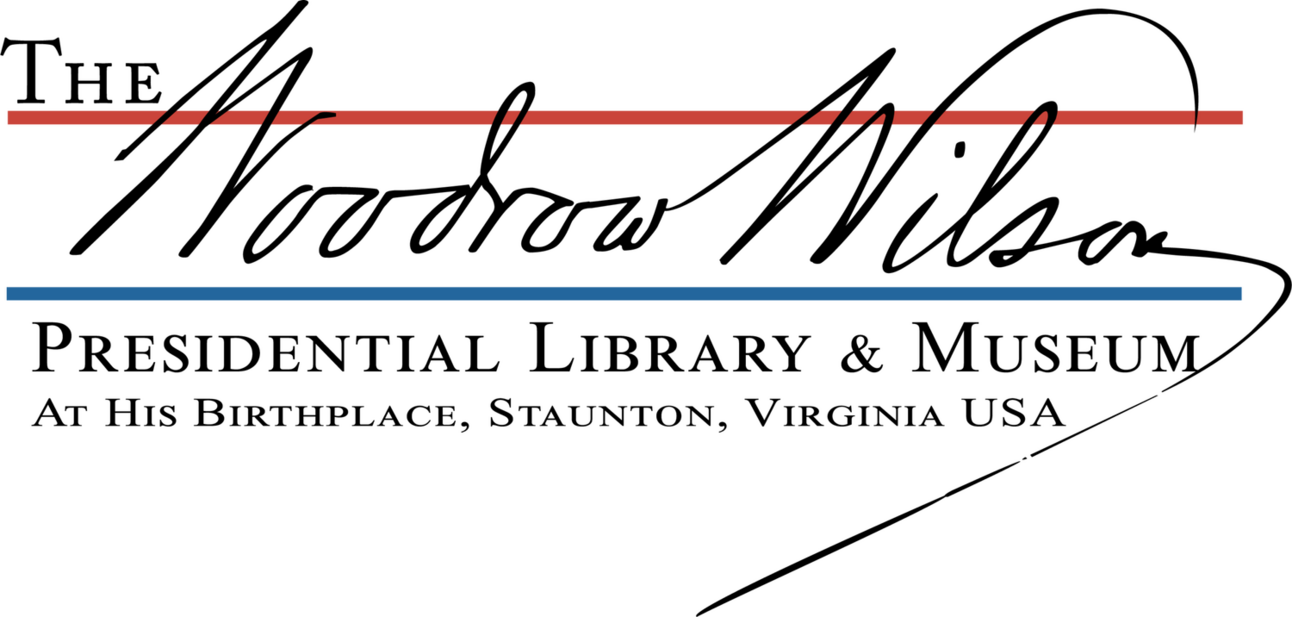
- Interactive map of the Woodrow Wilson Presidential Library area

General information
- Location: Staunton, Virginia, United States
- Named for: Woodrow Wilson
- Operator: Woodrow Wilson Presidential Library Foundation

Website
- woodrowwilson.org
- Woodrow Wilson Presidential Library Foundation
- U.S. National Register of Historic Places
- U.S. National Historic Landmark
- U.S. Historic district – Contributing property
- Virginia Landmarks Register
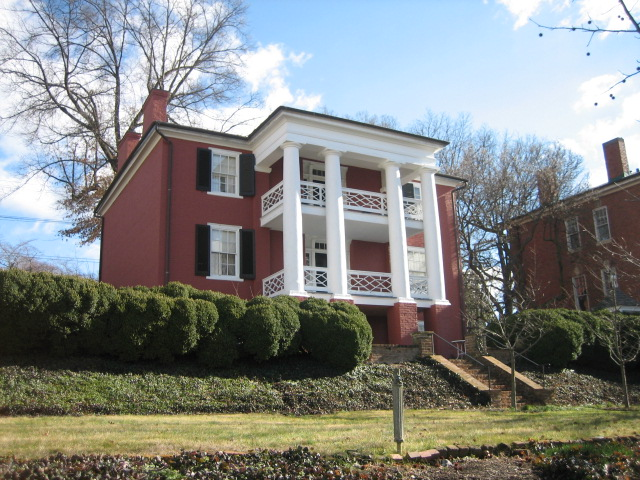
- Woodrow Wilson Birthplace

- Location within Virginia Location within the United States
- Coordinates: 38°9′1″N 79°4′9″W
- Built: 1846
- Architectural style: Greek Revival
- Part of: Gospel Hill Historic District (ID85000299)
- NRHP reference No.: 66000926
- VLR No.: 132-0004

Significant dates
- Added to NRHP: October 15, 1966
- Designated NHL: July 19, 1964
- Designated CP: February 14, 1985
- Designated VLR: September 9, 1969

The Woodrow Wilson Presidential Library and Museum is a complex located in Staunton, Virginia. It contains the President's birthplace, known as the Manse, a museum that explores the life and times of Woodrow Wilson (1856–1924), a 6,800 square feet (630 m^{2}) Research Library, a gift shop, and several other buildings that are not open to the public. Like all United States presidential libraries for administrations prior to that of Herbert Hoover, Wilson's is not part of the Federal National Archives' presidential library system.

== The Birthplace Manse ==
The Woodrow Wilson Birthplace is referred to as the Manse, which is the name of a Presbyterian minister's home. It was built in 1846 by the Staunton First Presbyterian Church. It has 12 rooms with 12 fireplaces and cost around $4,000 to build. The Wilson family moved into the house in 1855 as his father was ordained as a Presbyterian pastor and called to serve as a pastor in Staunton. At that time the family consisted of his parents—Jessie Woodrow Wilson and Joseph Ruggles Wilson—and their two daughters Marion and Annie, who were about four and two years old, respectively. Thomas Woodrow Wilson was born in what is now called the "birth room" on December 28, 1856. The Wilsons left the Manse in 1858 when Joseph Wilson accepted a call from a congregation in Augusta, Georgia.

Wilson continued to visit Staunton throughout his life often referring to it as home. After his 1912 presidential election, Wilson and Ellen visited Staunton over his birthday in December of that year and spent two nights in the Manse as a guest of his good friend Rev Frazier who was then the Minister at the First Presbyterian Church of Staunton. After the Wilsons moved out of the Manse it remained the Presbyterian minister's until the 1920s. It was after the former President's death in 1924 that his widow Edith Bolling Galt Wilson along with former cabinet members and Staunton community members decided to create a Birthplace museum to commemorate Wilson's life.

The Woodrow Wilson Birthplace Foundation was officially incorporated in 1938, and the house was restored to its 1850s look over the next 80 years, which included removing bathrooms, changing light fixtures, and stripping paint. The house was opened to the public in 1941, being formally dedicated as a museum by President Franklin D. Roosevelt. The property was designated a National Historic Landmark in 1964, and was added to the National Register of Historic Places in 1966. It is located in the Gospel Hill Historic District.

== The Library ==
The Woodrow Wilson Presidential Library houses Woodrow Wilson materials from during and immediately after his lifetime, memoirs of those who worked with him, and governmental volumes concerning World War I. The library is located at 235 East Beverley Street in Staunton, Virginia. It boasts the third-largest collection of Wilson's papers. Wilson's official papers are located at The Library of Congress. Princeton University also maintains a large collection of Wilson papers from his tenure as Professor and President of the university. The Woodrow Wilson Library focuses on the digitization of all of the President's papers and other materials in order to make the papers more accessible to the general public. It is open to researchers by appointment only.

== The Museum ==
The Museum—opened to the public in 1990—is on North Coalter street two doors down from the Manse and in front of the library. The 8,000-square-foot (740 m^{2}) Museum contains eight museum galleries that focus on the life and times of Wilson. Highlights of the museum include the president's 1919 Pierce-Arrow limousine and an interactive trench exhibit based on a World War I trench.

== See also ==
- List of residences of presidents of the United States
- List of National Historic Landmarks in Virginia
- National Register of Historic Places listings in Staunton, Virginia
- Woodrow Wilson Boyhood Home
