= Oakley Farm (Warm Springs, Virginia) =

Historic house in Virginia, United States

- U.S. National Register of Historic Places
- Virginia Landmarks Register
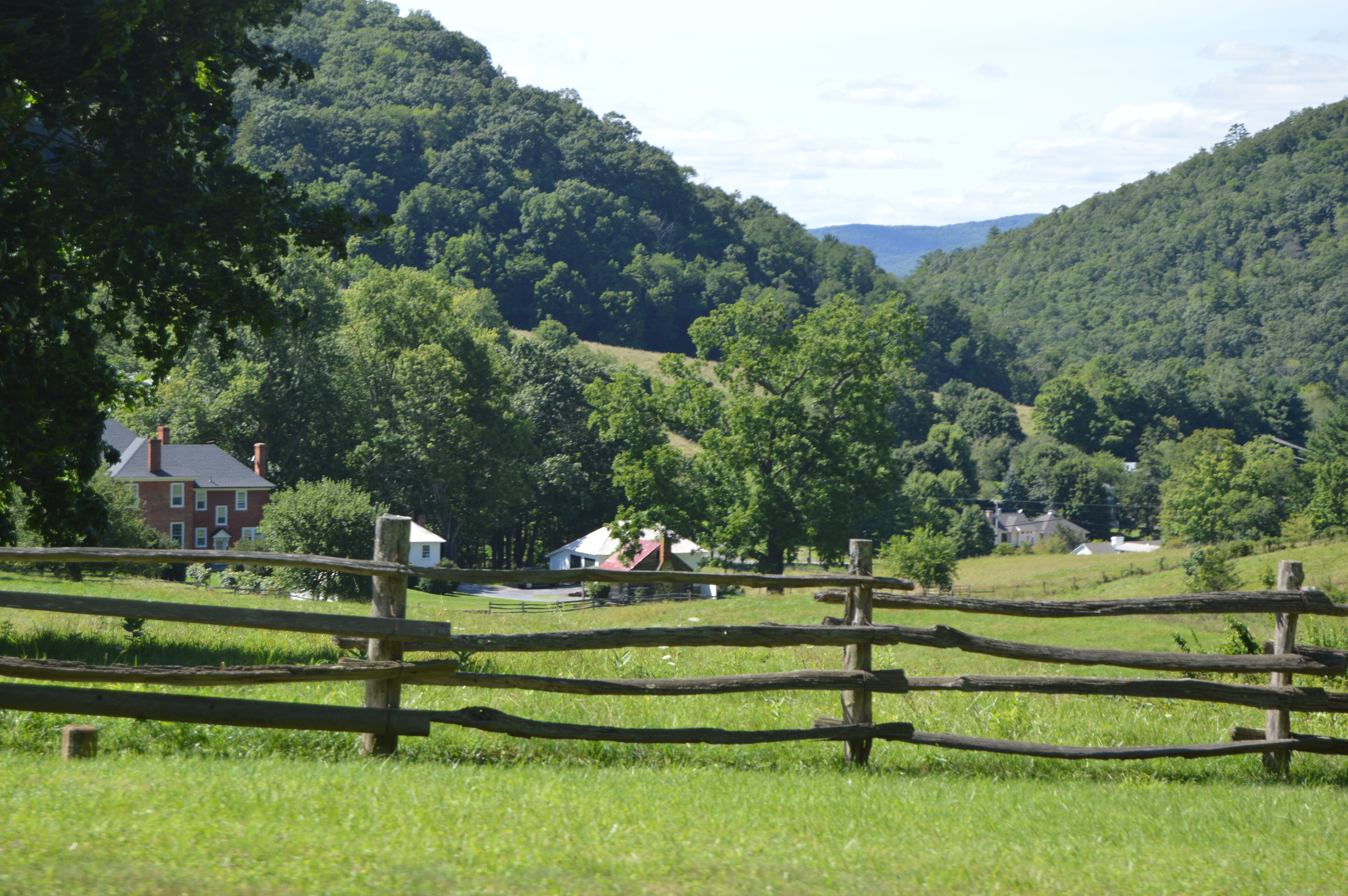
- Roadside view of the farmstead

- Location within Virginia Location within the United States
- Location: 11865 Sam Snead Highway (US 220), Warm Springs, Virginia
- Coordinates: 38°02′33″N 79°47′23″W
- Area: 60 acres (24 ha)
- Built: c.1834, 1921-22
- Architect: T.J. Collins & Sons; et al.
- Architectural style: Federal, Greek Revival
- NRHP reference No.: 07000803
- VLR No.: 008-0040

Significant dates
- Added to NRHP: August 8, 2007
- Designated VLR: June 6, 2007

Oakley Farm, located at 11865 Sam Snead Highway (US 220) in Warm Springs, Virginia, includes the brick house named Oakley that was built starting in 1834, and completed before 1837, as a two-story side-passage form dwelling with a one-story front porch with transitional Federal / Greek Revival detail. It was later expanded and modified to a one-room-deep center passage plan dwelling with a two-story ell.

The house was expanded and remodeled to Colonial Revival style during 1921–22, "according to a design apparently conceived by the Staunton architectural firm T. J. Collins and Sons." A two-story kitchen and service wing was added. Also on the property are a contributing laundry and wood house and a garage, both built in 1922; a 19th-century log cabin that may originally have served as a slave cabin; a Long Barn and a machinery shed (ca. 1905); two stables of Colonial Revival design dating to the 1920s or early 1930s; and a fieldstone wall. It includes Federal and Greek Revival architecture. Oakley Farm was listed on the National Register of Historic Places in 2007. The listing included ten contributing buildings and five other contributing structures on 60 acres (24 ha).
