= Rita Dove: An American Poet =

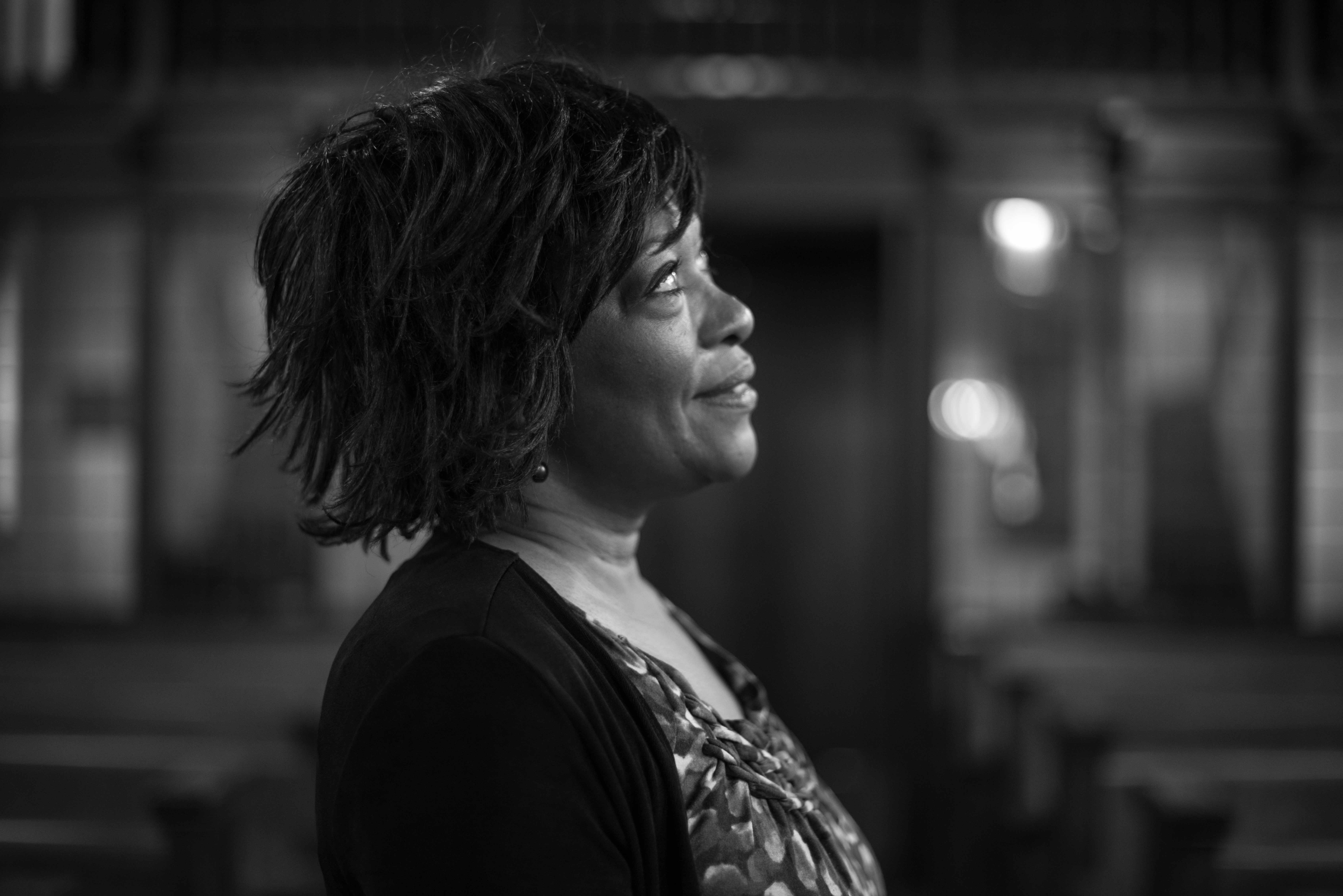
- Photo by Montes-Bradley.
- Directed by: Eduardo Montes-Bradley
- Produced by: Heritage Film Project
- Starring: Rita Dove
- Music by: Judith Shatin, Franz Peter Schubert, Johann Sebastian Bach
- Distributed by: Alexander Street Press Filmakers Library, Kanopy
- Release date: January 31, 2014
- Running time: 50 minutes
- Country: United States
- Language: English

Rita Dove: An American Poet is a 2014 documentary film produced, directed and edited by Eduardo Montes-Bradley. It is a biographical sketch of U.S. Poet Laureate and National Medal of Arts winner Rita Dove.

The film explores the poet's life, exposing fundamental facts of Dove's childhood and formative years growing up in Akron, Ohio in the 1950s and during the turbulent 1960s.

== Synopsis ==
Rita Dove: An American Poet is structured in 11 parts (chapters): Prologue, nine consecutive "books" – simulating the preference shown by Dove in recent works – and the Epilogue. Each book, identified with Roman numerals, targets a different aspect in the life and whereabouts of Rita Dove, each of them introduced by the poet reading a poem significant to the theme.

Each part is made of a series of in-depth, on-camera interviews with Poet Laureate Rita Dove, which were conducted and recorded between September 2012 and October 2013. They are interspersed with hundreds of still images and several hours of home movies, many of which were recorded by her father Ray A. Dove as a way of recording family life in the 1950s and 1960s.

== Production and filming ==
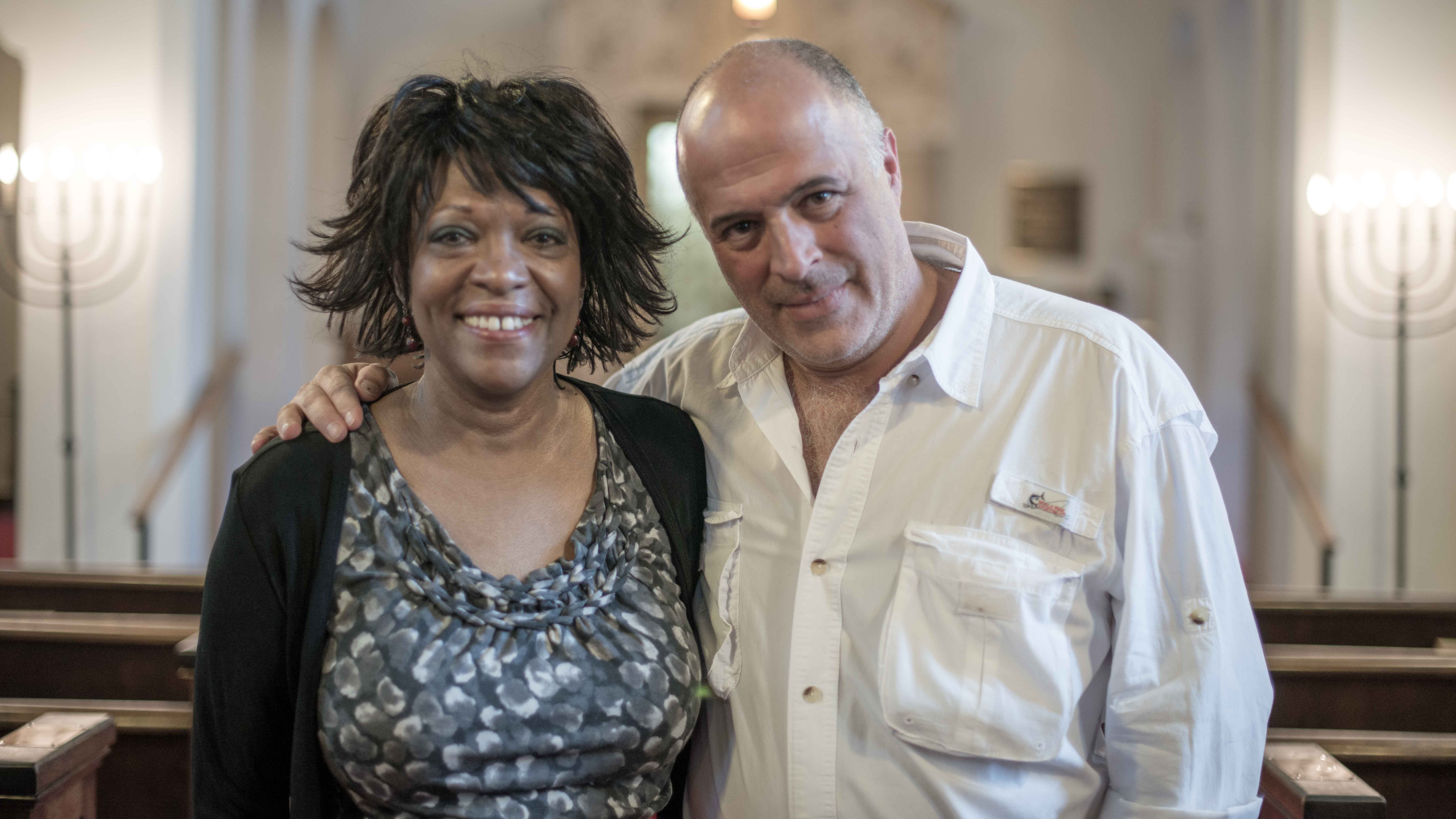
Montes-Bradley and Rita Dove on set

Rita Dove began as a series of conversations between Rita Dove and the filmmaker which took place in Charlottesville between September 2012 and October 2013. The conversations were later edited and combined with hundreds of still images and several hours of home movies from the Dove family's collection. Most of the film's images are the results of the efforts of Rita Dove's father (Ray A. Dove) to record their family's life in the 1950s and 1960s.

The principal interview with Rita Dove took place in September 2012 and was conducted at the writer's residence in Charlottesville, Virginia. Additional filming took place in Temple House of Israel and in the streets of Staunton. The inserts of Rita Dove reading were filmed at the director's house near Charlottesville.

Funding for Rita Dove was partially raised by a sponsorship by the International Documentary Foundation.

== Release ==
Rita Dove premiered at The Paramount, on January 31, 2014, where it was presented as a Martin Luther King Day headliner by the Office for Diversity and Equity, Lifetime Learning, Alumni and Parent Engagement and the Department of English, College of Arts and Sciences at the University of Virginia.

== Soundtrack ==
Three composers are credited on the film: Judith Shatin, Franz Peter Schubert, and Johann Sebastian Bach. Shatin's "Tower of the Eight Winds" Music for violin & Piano has the strongest musical presence in the score. Shatin's compositions were performed by The Borup-Ernst Duo and recorded on the label of the American Composers Forum (Innova).

== Reception ==
Rita Dove: An American Poet received favorable reviews from The Video Review Magazine for Libraries and C-Ville Weekly. Both outlets cited the use of family photos and other footage as highlights, with Lawrence A. Garretson of C-Ville Weekly stating that it helped "achieve its own kind of cinematic lyricism—visual poetry that pays homage to Dove's own techniques".
