= William H. Landes =

American politician (1858–1931)

Member of the Virginia Senate from the 9th district
- In office January 20, 1915 – January 12, 1916
- Preceded by: Edward Echols
- Succeeded by: Cornelius T. Jordan

32nd Mayor of Staunton, Virginia
- In office 1898–1908
- Preceded by: Alexander H. Fultz
- Succeeded by: Hampton H. Wayt

Personal details
- Born: William Henry Landes; December 13, 1858 Warm Springs, Virginia, U.S.
- Died: December 30, 1931 (aged 73) Staunton, Virginia, U.S.
- Party: Democratic
- Spouse: Hester Virginia Link
- Education: University of Virginia

William Henry Landes (December 13, 1858 – December 30, 1931) was an American lawyer and politician who served ten years as mayor of Staunton, Virginia and briefly as a member of the Virginia Senate. A Democrat, he won a January 1915 special election to succeed Edward Echols in the Senate but lost reelection later that year to Independent Cornelius T. Jordan.

Senate of Virginia
Preceded by Edward Echols	Virginia Senator for the 9th District; 1915–1916	Succeeded by Cornelius T. Jordan
