= Edward Echols =

American politician

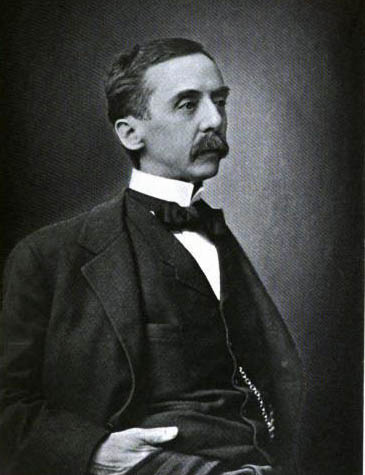

President pro tempore of the Virginia Senate
- In office January 8, 1908 – December 19, 1914
- Preceded by: Henry T. Wickham
- Succeeded by: C. Harding Walker

Member of the Virginia Senate from the 9th district
- In office January 10, 1906 – December 19, 1914
- Preceded by: John N. Opie
- Succeeded by: William H. Landes
- In office December 4, 1889 – December 1, 1897
- Preceded by: Absalom Koiner
- Succeeded by: John N. Opie

18th Lieutenant Governor of Virginia
- In office January 1, 1898 – January 1, 1902
- Governor: James Hoge Tyler
- Preceded by: Robert Craig Kent
- Succeeded by: Joseph Edward Willard

Member of the Virginia House of Delegates for Augusta and Staunton City
- In office December 5, 1883 – December 4, 1889
- Preceded by: J. Marshall Hanger
- Succeeded by: George M. Cochran Jr.

Personal details
- Born: September 2, 1849 Union, Virginia, U.S.
- Died: December 19, 1914 (aged 65) Staunton, Virginia, U.S.
- Party: Democratic
- Spouse: Margaret Young Echols (m.1895)
- Children: 2
- Parent: John Echols (father)
- Education: Washington College; University of Virginia
- Profession: Attorney

Edward Echols (September 2, 1849 – December 19, 1914) was a U.S. political figure from the Commonwealth of Virginia. Echols held office as the 18th Lieutenant Governor of Virginia from 1898 to 1902.

Edward Echols was born in Monroe County (now in West Virginia). There is some confusion over his birth year, but he is listed in the 1850 census as being one year old in September 1850. He and his family moved to Staunton, Virginia, after the Civil War. He also served for six years in the Virginia House of Delegates and for a total of twelve years in the Senate of Virginia. His father, John Echols, was a brigadier general in the Confederate Army during the American Civil War. Echols served as the National Valley Bank's third president from 1905 to 1915.

His house at Staunton, known as Oakdene, was added to the National Register of Historic Places in 1982.

== Sources ==
- Richmond Evening Journal. December 19, 1914.
- Lyon Gardiner Tyler (1906). Men of Mark in Virginia. Men of Mark Pub. Co. p. 111. "Edward Echols Virginia."

Political offices
Preceded by Robert Craig Kent	Lieutenant Governor of Virginia; 1898–1902	Succeeded by Joseph Edward Willard
Senate of Virginia
Preceded by John N. Opie	Virginia Senator for the 9th District; 1906–1914	Succeeded by William H. Landes
Preceded by Henry T. Wickham	President pro tempore of the Virginia Senate; 1908–1914	Succeeded by C. Harding Walker
