= Robert Craig Kent =

American politician

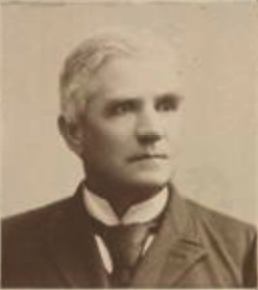

17th Lieutenant Governor of Virginia
- In office 1894–1898
- Governor: Charles Triplett O'Ferrall
- Preceded by: James Hoge Tyler
- Succeeded by: Edward Echols

Member of the Virginia House of Delegates from Wythe County
- In office December 4, 1889 – December 6, 1893
- Preceded by: David H. Porter
- Succeeded by: R. W. Sanders

Personal details
- Born: Robert Craig Kent; November 28, 1828 Wythe County, Virginia, U.S.
- Died: April 30, 1905 (aged 76) Wytheville, Virginia, U.S.
- Party: Democratic
- Spouse: Anastasia Pleasants Smith Kent (m.1867)
- Children: 7
- Education: Princeton University
- Profession: Attorney

Robert Craig Kent (November 28, 1828 – April 30, 1905) was an attorney and political figure from the Commonwealth of Virginia. A graduate of Princeton University, Kent was admitted to the Virginia Bar in 1853 and commenced the practice of law in Wytheville. After several years of successful private practice, Kent was elected as the Commonwealth's Attorney for Wythe County, then twice to the Virginia House of Delegates. In 1894, he won election to a four-year term as the 17th Lieutenant Governor of Virginia.

== Sources ==
- Lyon Gardiner Tyler (1915). Encyclopedia of Virginia Biography, Under the Editorial Supervision of Lyon ... Lewis historical publishing company.

Political offices
Preceded by James Hoge Tyler	Lieutenant Governor of Virginia; 1894–1898	Succeeded by Edward Echols
