= John N. Opie =

American politician (1844–1906)

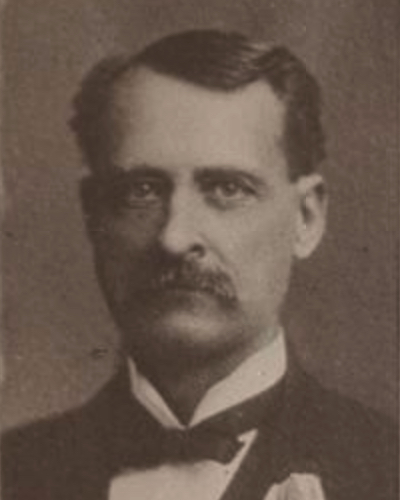

Member of the Virginia Senate from the 9th district
- In office December 1, 1897 – January 10, 1906
- Preceded by: Edward Echols
- Succeeded by: Edward Echols

Member of the Virginia House of Delegates for Augusta and Staunton City
- In office December 5, 1883 – December 2, 1885 Serving with Edward Echols
- Preceded by: James H. Skinner
- Succeeded by: Alexander B. Lightner

Personal details
- Born: John Newton Opie; March 13, 1844 Jefferson, Virginia, U.S.
- Died: January 26, 1906 (aged 61) Staunton, Virginia, U.S.
- Party: Democratic
- Spouses: Isabel Harman; Ida Fletcher
- Education: Virginia Military Institute

Military service
- Allegiance: Confederate States
- Branch/service: Confederate States Army
- Years of service: 1861–1865
- Rank: Captain
- Battles/wars: American Civil War; Battles of Bull Run; Battle of Cross Keys; Battle of Harpers Ferry; Battle of Antietam; Jones–Imboden Raid; Battle of Fairfield; Battle of Brandy Station; Battle of Piedmont

John Newton Opie (March 13, 1844 – January 26, 1906) was an American politician who served as a member of the Virginia Senate. His autobiography "A Rebel Cavalryman", detailed his service during the Civil War as an enlisted soldier and later Captain.

A believer in Women's suffrage, John N. Opie advocated for the right before Virginia's senate in 1904, for which he was called "...rather radical in his beliefs." Women's suffrage in Virginia was later achieved in 1920, fourteen years after his death.

Senate of Virginia
Preceded by Edward Echols	Virginia Senator for the 9th District; 1897–1906	Succeeded by Edward Echols
