= Allen Caperton Braxton =

American politician

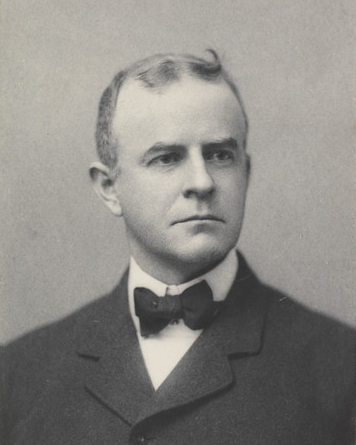
- Born: March 6, 1862; Monroe County, Virginia, US
- Died: March 22, 1914 (aged 52); Staunton, Virginia, US
- Occupation: Lawyer
- Spouse: Mary Patterson Miller (m. 1913)

Allen Caperton Braxton (March 6, 1862 – March 22, 1914) was a Virginia lawyer and member of the Virginia Constitutional Convention of 1901–1902. He is considered the founder of the Virginia State Corporation Commission, and was president of the Virginia Bar Association in 1906-07.

== Biography ==
Braxton was born at his grandfather's home in Monroe County shortly before West Virginia seceded from Virginia and became a state in its own right. He took pride in his ancestors, particularly Carter Braxton (who signed the Declaration of Independence) at whose ancestral estate Chericoke in King William County, Virginia he spent most of his childhood. His maternal grandfather was U.S. Senator Allen T. Caperton. Braxton was mostly home schooled but spent time at Pampatike academy. His father, Dr. Tomlin Braxton, died when young Allen was 16, so he left school to support his siblings. He tutored the children of West Virginia Supreme Court Justice Patton, and later worked as a civil engineer and bookkeeper, among other jobs.

After reading law and taking a single course at the University of Virginia, Braxton received a license top practice law in Virginia in 1883, and moved to Staunton. He was twice elected commonwealth's attorney and city attorney, serving from 1885 to 1889. He then established a private law firm, which prospered and ultimately opened a second office in Richmond, Virginia.

Braxton represented Staunton and Augusta County in the state constitutional convention of 1901-02, where he served on committees concerning Corporations, the Judiciary and Final Revision, as well as assisted the Committee on Finance and Banking. He supported the convention's mostly successful efforts to erase the gains in civil rights for African-Americans made during Reconstruction, and also effectively disenfranchised half of the Commonwealth's poor white voters. His work on the corporation committee led to the creation of the State Corporation Commission in 1902. Braxton promoted the commission as an independent agency that would balance the interests of consumers and common carriers, subject to review only by the Virginia Supreme Court. Braxton also successfully supported adopting that new constitution without submitting it to the electorate for approval.

Welcoming the American Bar Association to Virginia for its twenty-sixth annual meeting in 1903, Braxton declared, "No state is more peculiarly American than Virginia." Braxton was a delegate to the Democratic National Convention in 1904, before his term as President of the Virginia Bar Association. He never held statewide elective office, although rumors held him as a possible Democratic vice-presidential candidate in 1904, as well as a potential primary opponent to Senator Thomas S. Martin the following year. Braxton moved to Richmond in 1904 to serve as counsel to the Richmond, Fredericksburg and Potomac Railroad.

Besides expertise in corporate law, Braxton wrote on constitutional issues, including the Eleventh and Fifteenth Amendments, the respective subjects of his best-known addresses to the Virginia State Bar Association, other than those advocating revision of the state Constitution in 1901. In particular, Braxton considered the Fifteenth Amendment an abomination aimed at the South; and thus justified the poll tax and other methods to limit black citizens' voting rights. In preparation for the constitutional convention, Braxton wrote to Booker T. Washington concerning how much education the commonwealth should provide to black children, suggesting that not much "book-learning" was required.

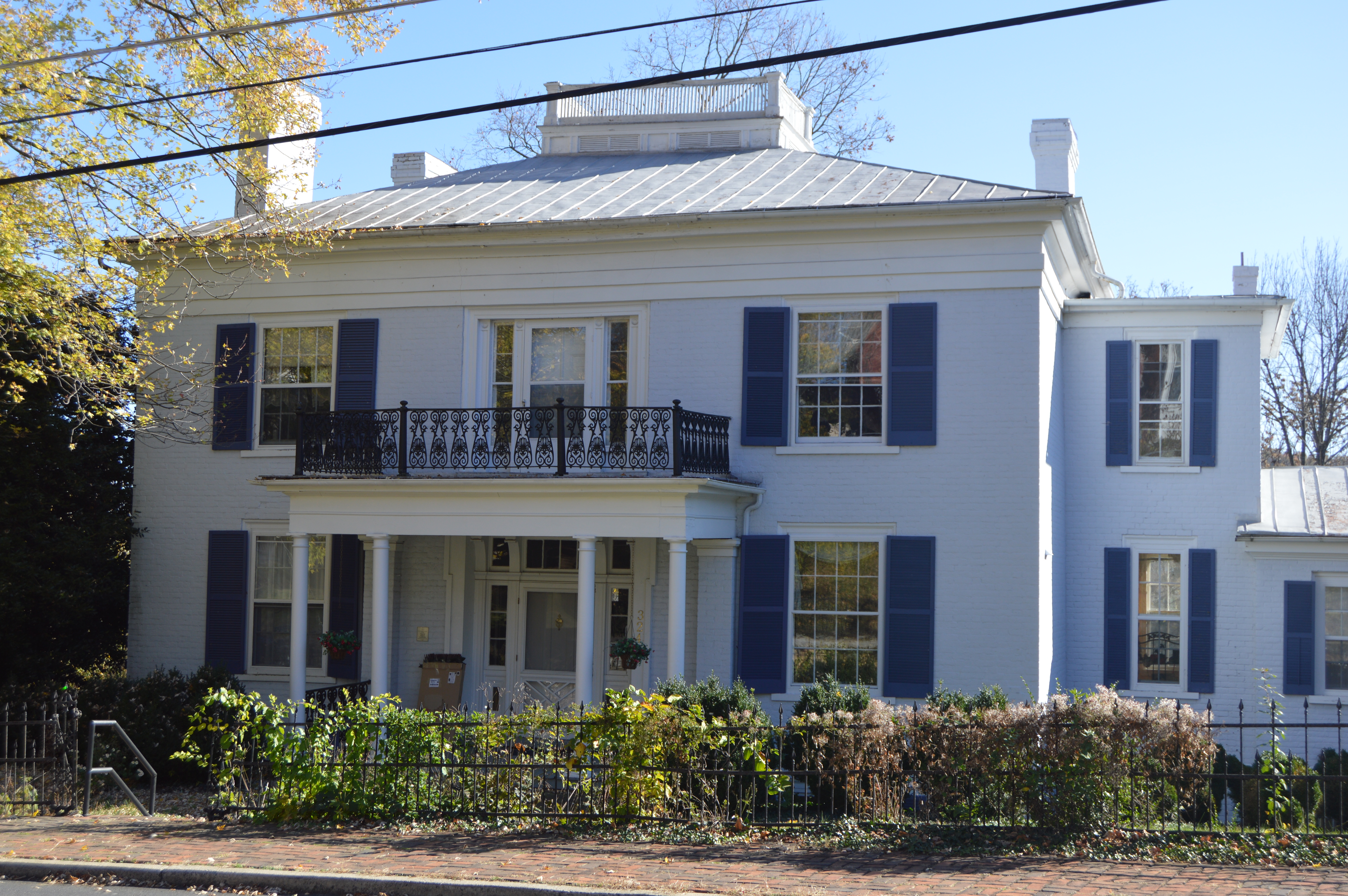
Braxton's home in Stanton

Late in his life, in Atlantic City, Braxton married the nurse who helped him recover from a serious illness.

The University of Virginia acquired his papers. His home at Staunton, known as the Thomas J. Michie House, was added to the National Register of Historic Places in 1982.
