= John Echols =

American politician

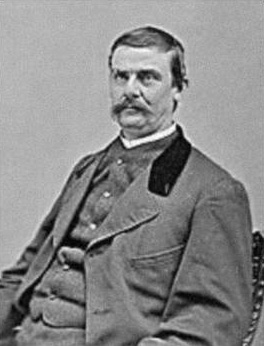

Member of the Virginia House of Delegates for Augusta and Staunton City
- In office December 5, 1877 – December 7, 1881
- Preceded by: Alexander H. H. Stuart
- Succeeded by: James H. Skinner

Member of the Virginia House of Delegates from Monroe County
- In office January 12, 1852 – December 5, 1853
- Preceded by: Christopher J. Beirne
- Succeeded by: J. Tiffany

Personal details
- Born: March 20, 1823 Lynchburg, Virginia, U.S.
- Died: May 24, 1896 (aged 73) Staunton, Virginia, U.S.
- Resting place: Thornrose Cemetery, Staunton, Virginia
- Party: Democratic
- Spouse(s): Mary Jane Caperton (m. 1844) Mary Helen Cochran Reid
- Children: 6, including Edward
- Education: Virginia Military Institute; Washington College; Harvard University

Military service
- Allegiance: Confederate States
- Branch/service: Confederate States Army
- Years of service: 1861–1865
- Rank: Brigadier general
- Battles/wars: American Civil War: First Battle of Bull Run; Valley Campaign; Battle of Droop Mountain; Battle of New Market; Siege of Petersburg

John Echols (March 20, 1823 – May 24, 1896) was a general in the Confederate States Army during the American Civil War.

== Early and family life ==
John Echols was born in Lynchburg, Virginia. He joined the Virginia Military Institute in 1840 and resigned in the next year; being made an honorary graduate in 1843. He received further education at Washington College and at Harvard College. A tall imposing man, standing 6 feet 4 inches tall, Echols quickly became a leader among his peers. Echols married twice. His first wife was a sister of Senator Allen T. Caperton (also of what became West Virginia). After she died, he married Mrs. Mary Helen Cochran Reid, a widow from New York City.

== Early legal and political career ==
On becoming a lawyer in 1843 he settled in Union, Monroe County (now West Virginia). Echols represented Monroe County in the Virginia House of Delegates 1852–1853 and in the Virginia Secession Convention of 1861.

== Confederate service ==
Both Echols and Allen T. Caperton voted for Virginia's secession from the United States on April 17, 1861 at the Richmond convention. When the secession ordinance was put to public vote on May 23 Monroe County voted 1,085 to 79 in favor of secession. Echols offered his service to Virginia. He gathered a group of volunteers and was commissioned as a lieutenant colonel. On May 6, 1861, General Robert E. Lee ordered Lieutenant Colonel Echols to call out and muster in volunteer forces, not to exceed two regiments, to rendezvous these men at Staunton for Joseph E. Johnston's fledgling army.

Echols was then assigned command of the 27th Virginia Infantry, leading the regiment in the fighting at the First Battle of Manassas under Stonewall Jackson. He was soon promoted to colonel, serving in the Valley Campaign. He was severely wounded at the First Battle of Kernstown on March 23, disabling him for several weeks. Echols was promoted to brigadier general on April 16, 1862 during his convalescence.

Later in the year, he was assigned to command a brigade of the army of Western Virginia. He participated as a brigade commander in William W. Loring's Kanawha Valley Campaign of 1862 and the occupation of the Kanawha Valley in September. After Loring withdrew to the mountains, Echols replaced him in command of the Department of Western Virginia. He promptly reoccupied Charleston, but was forced to retreat by a superior enemy force.

Echols resigned his departmental command in the fall of 1862, and, during the following summer, served upon the three-man court of inquiry held in Richmond to investigate the cause of the fall of Vicksburg. Later in the year, he commanded the Confederate forces in the Battle of Droop Mountain, stubbornly resisting a series of Federal attacks. In May 1864, he commanded John C. Breckinridge's right wing at the Battle of New Market in the Shenandoah Valley.

General Robert E. Lee recalled Echols' Brigade to rejoin the Army of Northern Virginia near Cold Harbor during the Siege of Petersburg. On August 22, 1864, he was given charge of the District of Southwestern Virginia, and on March 29, 1865, Echols was assigned command of the western department of Virginia, relieving General Breckinridge, who had joined the staff of President Jefferson Davis. On April 2, Echols, with nearly 7,000 men, began a hasty march to unite with Lee.

He reached Christiansburg, Virginia, on April 10, where he received a telegram announcing Lee's surrender at Appomattox Courthouse. At a solemn council of war, Echols decided to march to unite with Johnston's army, and Echols led two brigades southward towards North Carolina. Subsequently, he accompanied President Davis to Augusta, Georgia.

== Postwar career ==
Monroe County had been included in the new state of West Virginia without its consent and the new state government would not allow ex-Confederates to practice law. After the war, Echols resumed the practice of law in Staunton. He helped select the members of the Committee of Nine, a group of state leaders who worked to ensure that the state be readmitted into the Union and former Confederates could once again hold political office.

Echols returned to the Virginia House of Delegates 1878–1881, representing Staunton and Augusta County. While there, he sided with the Funders against the Readjusters, which briefly reunited Republicans and liberal Democrats, and tried to allocate some of Virginia's massive wartime debt to West Virginia and had supported Reconstruction.

He rebuilt his fortune and became President of the Staunton National Valley Bank. When the hastily agglomerated Chesapeake, Ohio and Southwestern Railroad went bankrupt, he became its Receiver and General Manager. He lived in Kentucky the last ten years of his life as he managed the railroad's affairs.

== Death and legacy ==
He died at Oakdene the residence of his son, Edward Echols (later lieutenant governor of Virginia), at Staunton, where he is buried in Thornrose Cemetery. The General Echols House located in Union, Monroe County, West Virginia, is significant for its association with John Echols, A Brigadier General in the army of the Confederate States of America. The house possesses additional distinction as one of Monroe County's oldest and best preserved examples of Greek Revival architecture.

== See also ==
- List of American Civil War generals (Confederate)
- Brig. Gen. John Echols House
