= Wharf Area Historic District =

Historic district in Virginia, United States

- U.S. National Register of Historic Places
- U.S. Historic district
- Virginia Landmarks Register
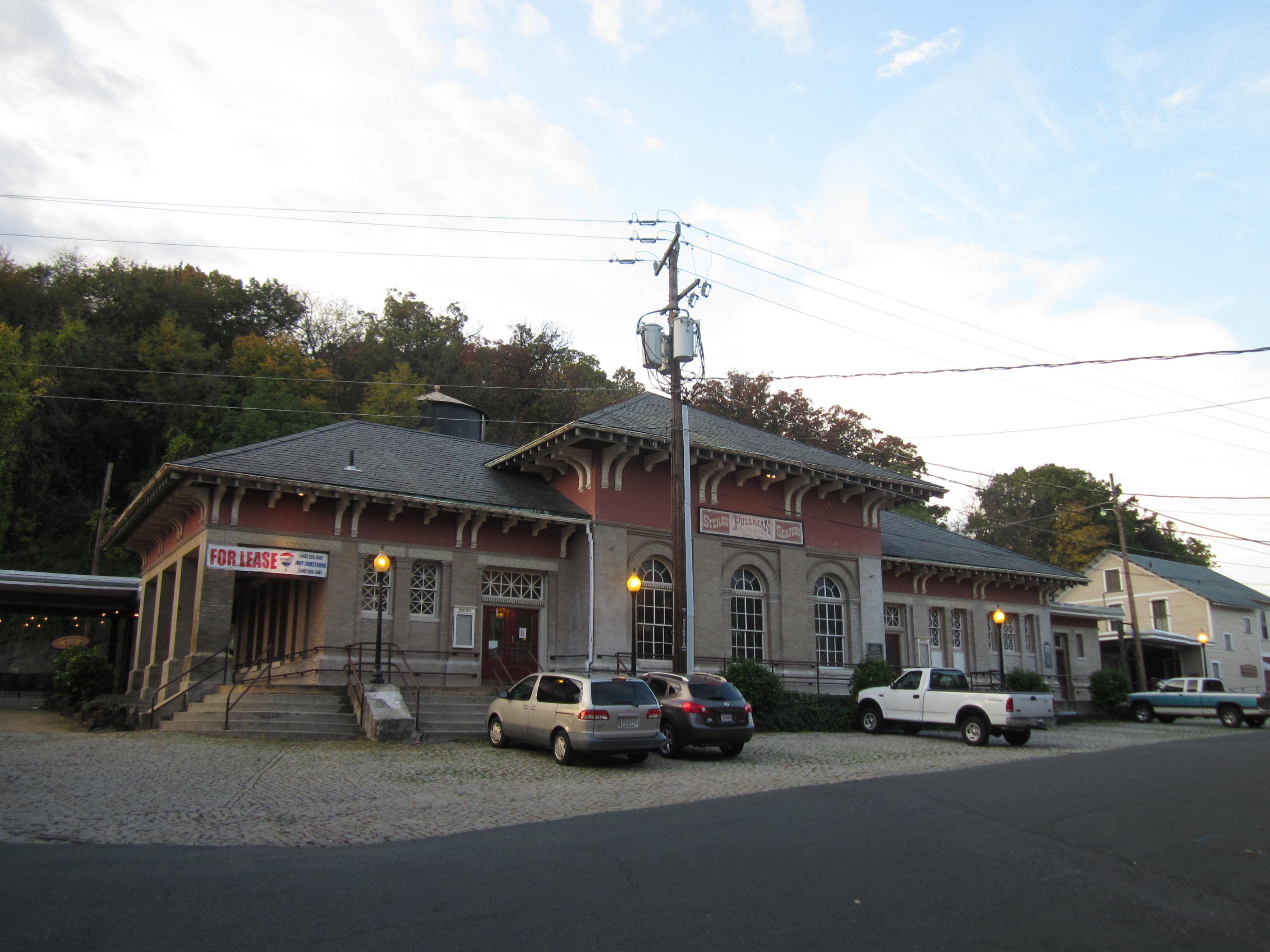
- Former Chesapeake and Ohio railway station

- Location within Virginia Location within the United States
- Location: Middlebrook Ave. between S. New and S. Lewis Sts., including S. Augusta St. to Johnson St., Boundary extended on E to Lewis Creek, Staunton, Virginia
- Coordinates: 38°8′50″N 79°4′22″W
- Area: 16.9 acres (6.8 ha)
- Architectural style: Greek Revival, Queen Anne, Federal, Pratt & Warren truss
- NRHP reference No.: 72001533, 82004605 (Boundary Increase)
- VLR No.: 132-0014

Significant dates
- Added to NRHP: November 9, 1972, July 19, 1982 (Boundary Increase)
- Designated VLR: December 21, 1971, December 16, 1980

Wharf Area Historic District is a national historic district located at Staunton, Virginia. The district encompasses 22 contributing buildings and 4 contributing structures. It is a warehouse and commercial district characterized by rows of late-19th century and early-20th century storefronts and an elongated plaza framed by small warehouses. The buildings are characteristically two- and three-story, brick structures in a variety of popular architectural styles including Greek Revival, Federal, and Queen Anne. Notable buildings and structures include the Railroad Water Tower, American Hotel (c. 1854), John Burns Building (1874), Erskine Building (1904), and Chesapeake and Ohio Railroad Station (1902).

It was added to the National Register of Historic Places in 1972, with a boundary increase in 1982.
