= The Oaks (Staunton, Virginia) =

Historic house in Virginia, United States

- U.S. National Register of Historic Places
- U.S. Historic district – Contributing property
- Virginia Landmarks Register
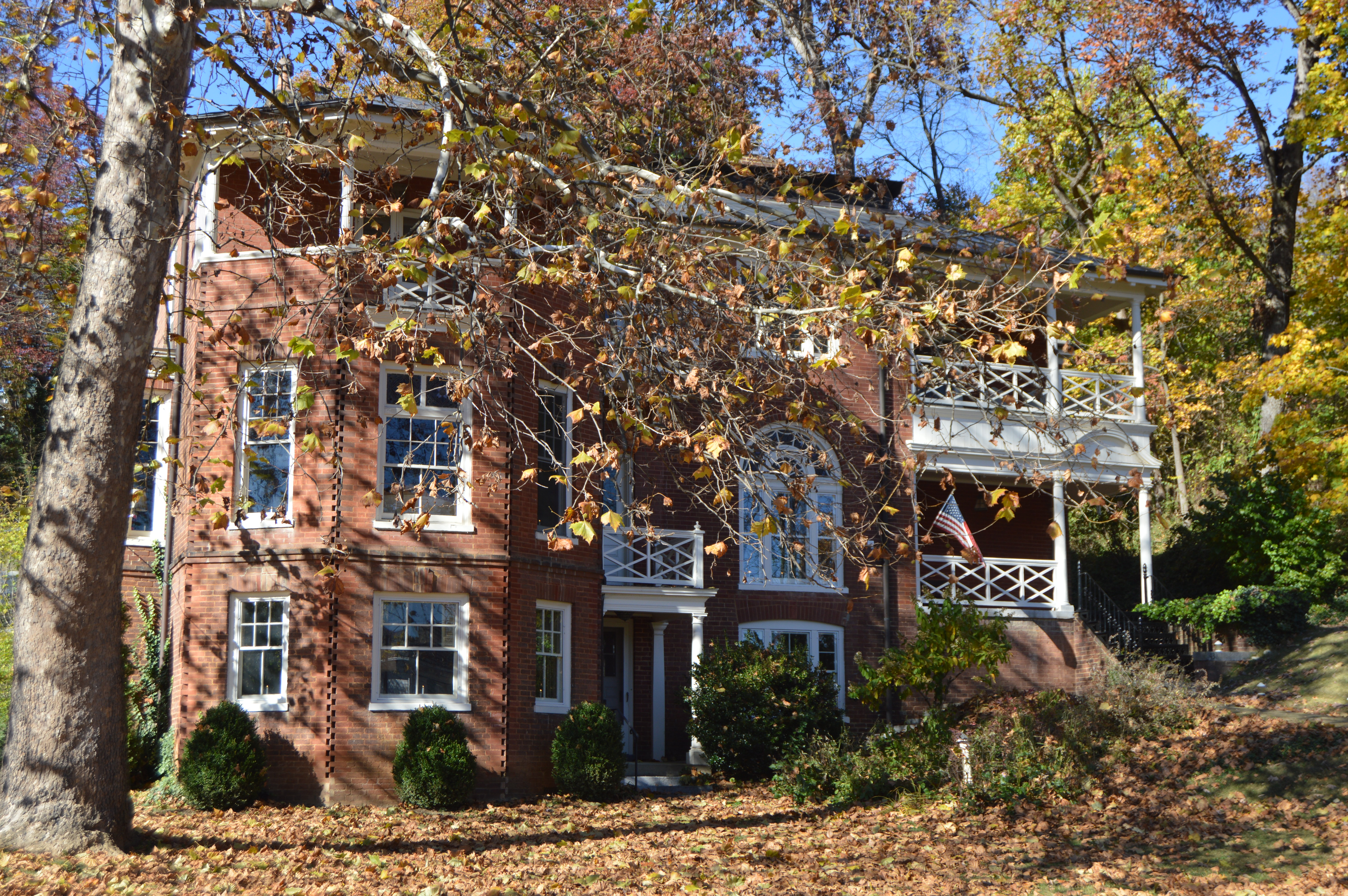
- Front of the house

- Location within Virginia Location within the United States
- Interactive map showing The Oaks’ location
- Location: 437 E. Beverly St., Staunton, Virginia
- Coordinates: 38°9′5″N 79°3′57″W
- Area: 1.4 acres (0.57 ha)
- Built: 1888
- Built by: Maj. Jedeiah Hotchkiss
- Architect: Winslow & Wetherell
- Part of: Gospel Hill Historic District (ID85000299)
- NRHP reference No.: 79003302
- VLR No.: 132-0021

Significant dates
- Added to NRHP: June 19, 1979
- Designated CP: February 14, 1985
- Designated VLR: December 19, 1978

From 1868 until his death in 1899, The Oaks was the home of Major Jedediah Hotchkiss. Hotchkiss made his mark in a number of fields including mapmaking, surveying, land and coal speculation, and education. During the Civil War, Hotchkiss first served under Gen. Robert E. Lee as topographical engineer, and then joined Gen. Stonewall Jackson's staff in the same capacity, soon becoming one of the General's closest aides. His campaign maps, now housed at the Library of Congress, are considered by Civil War historians to be among the finest ever made. Hotchkiss returned to Staunton after the war ended and began speculating in land and minerals. He also lectured and wrote extensively about Virginia's geology, geography, and Civil War history.

== History ==
There was a house on the site when Hotchkiss bought the property in 1868. A large addition to the rear of this original house appears on his 1884 map, and tax records for this period reveal a doubling of assessed building value in 1876 and another significant rise again in 1884. The chalet-style rear wing could have been built around this time. The main front was erected in 1888 on the site of the original building, perhaps incorporating part of the original foundations into its own. Assisted by the Boston architectural firm of Winslow & Wetherell, it is believed that much of the credit for the design and detailing of The Oaks goes to Hotchkiss, who supervised its construction very closely until its completion in 1890.

The Oaks is in private ownership.

== Architecture ==
Defying conventional style categorization, The Oaks's exterior displays many elements of the Shingle Style, although -it is·executed in brick. The somewhat restrained facade belies the richness of its interior which features seven magnificent mantelpieces executed by local craftsmen, tongue-and-groove cedar paneling and wainscoting, stained-glass windows, brass lighting fixtures, built-in cupboards, bookshelves, and a unique stand-up desk.

Unique in its design, The Oaks is difficult to categorize using conventional stylistic terms. The 21-room, 3-story structure exhibits some elements of the Shingle Style, although it is executed in brick, with various bonding patterns. The rather restrained facade is organized into three main bays, and the whole is crowned by a complex hip roof with carved modillion blocks in the cornice. The front of the lot is surrounded by an iron fence with an acorn motif on the posts.

The right bay consists of a recessed entrance with a sleeping porch above. Both these porches, as well as the sleeping porch on the top level ·of the left bay, are recessed under the roof line, a typical feature of the Shingle Style. The central bay is dominated by a 3-part, round-headed window on the second level; a stained-glass window with oak and floral motifs is fitted into the semicircular arch. Three doors, placed one above the other, originally led to small balconies. The protruding, 5-sided bay on the left features brick string courses and an open wedge pattern of rubbed bricks forming the joints between each side. Both side elevations have protruding bays with stained-glass panels in the windows on the second level. The rear portion of the house is a 3-story, brick chalet-style structure. The gable roof has extremely wide eaves which extend approximately 4 feet from the walls. Unusually large triangular wooden brackets with chamfered edges support the rafters which have carved ends. There are two small wooden balconies off the top-story windows on the north and south sides of this wing. There are also two outbuildings on the property. One is a 2-bay carriage house with segmental-arched openings which have been made rectangular with large concrete lintels; a loft is located under the shed roof. The other outbuilding appears to have been built in two stages and is now connected to the main house by a raised walkway. Although its original use is not known, part of it at one time did house Hotchkiss's gravity-flow water system.

The main hall is located on the second level of the central bay. This huge room has an open staircase of oak, pine and mahogany with paneled wainscoting and turned balusters; there is a bench built along the staircase wall. Nine-panel doors lead into the adjoining music room and library. The library is located in the protruding left bay and features Hotchkiss's unusual stand-up desk, a built-in bookcase covering an entire wall and a nicely paneled mantelpiece with slender, turned colonettes in the overmantel and small display shelves flanking the fireplace opening. The music room's woodwork is all painted an ivory color. This was originally the parlor and is located in the right bay behind the entrance porch. On the first level, the largest room is the original dining room. The unusual built-in cupboard has paneled and glass doors, mirrors and spiral colonettes. Across the hall from the dining room is the old breakfast room which contains the door to Hotchkiss's enormous walk-in safe located under the entrance porch (it was here that he housed all his now highly- valued map collection). The third level contains the bedrooms which open onto a huge central hall. It is less ornate than the main living level, but there are two mantelpieces of note.

The older rear wing of The Oaks connects to the front section in all three levels. In the basement of the wing is a large fireplace opening, which indicates that this room was probably the original kitchen. The second level of the wing now contains a small kitchen behind an additional dining room. In this room is a very simple mantelpiece which consists of pilasters supporting an undecorated frieze and mantel shelf. The original staircase of the wing remains in a hall between this dining room and the newer front addition. The third level of the wing contains an additional bedroom and bath. The flooring of the back wing is random-width pine, and all of the woodwork and molding is much simpler than that in the 1888 front section of The Oaks.
