= Augusta County Courthouse =

Historic courthouse in Virginia, US

- U.S. National Register of Historic Places
- U.S. Historic district – Contributing property
- Virginia Landmarks Register
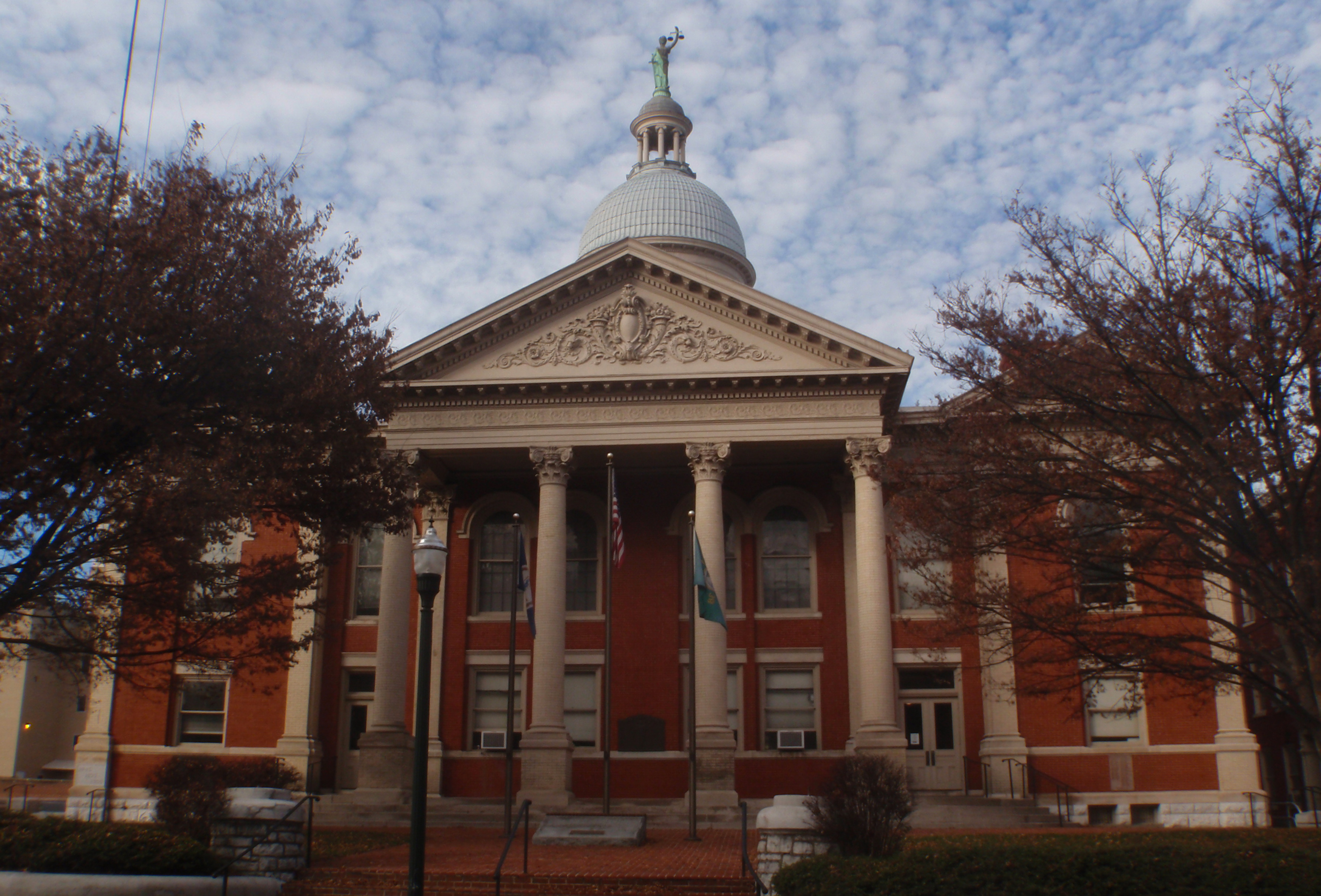

- Location within Virginia Location within the United States
- Location: 1 E. Johnson St., Staunton, Virginia
- Coordinates: 38°8′55″N 79°4′21″W
- Area: 1 acre (0.40 ha) or less
- Built: 1901
- Architectural style: Beaux Arts
- NRHP reference No.: 82001826
- VLR No.: 132-0001

Significant dates
- Added to NRHP: June 15, 1982
- Designated VLR: June 15, 1982

The Augusta County Courthouse is a two-story, red brick, public building in Staunton, Virginia. It was listed on the National Register of Historic Places (NRHP) in 1982. It was designed by T.J. Collins, and construction ended in the autumn of 1901. It is located in the Beverley Historic District. It is the fifth court house constructed on the site, the first having been a log building constructed in 1755.

The building has a two-story, four-bay central portico, with one-bay hyphens connecting to one-bay wings on either side, a domed cupola, with extensive ornamentation on the pediments and the capitals of the yellow, pressed brick columns. The entrances are on the hyphens, rather than the central pavilion, with a stone belt course around the entire structure. Design follows the Beaux Arts architectural style.

Its historical significance is in its unique architecture, as well as its history and records, some dating back to the Colonial era.
