= Kable House =

Historic house in Virginia, United States

- U.S. National Register of Historic Places
- Virginia Landmarks Register
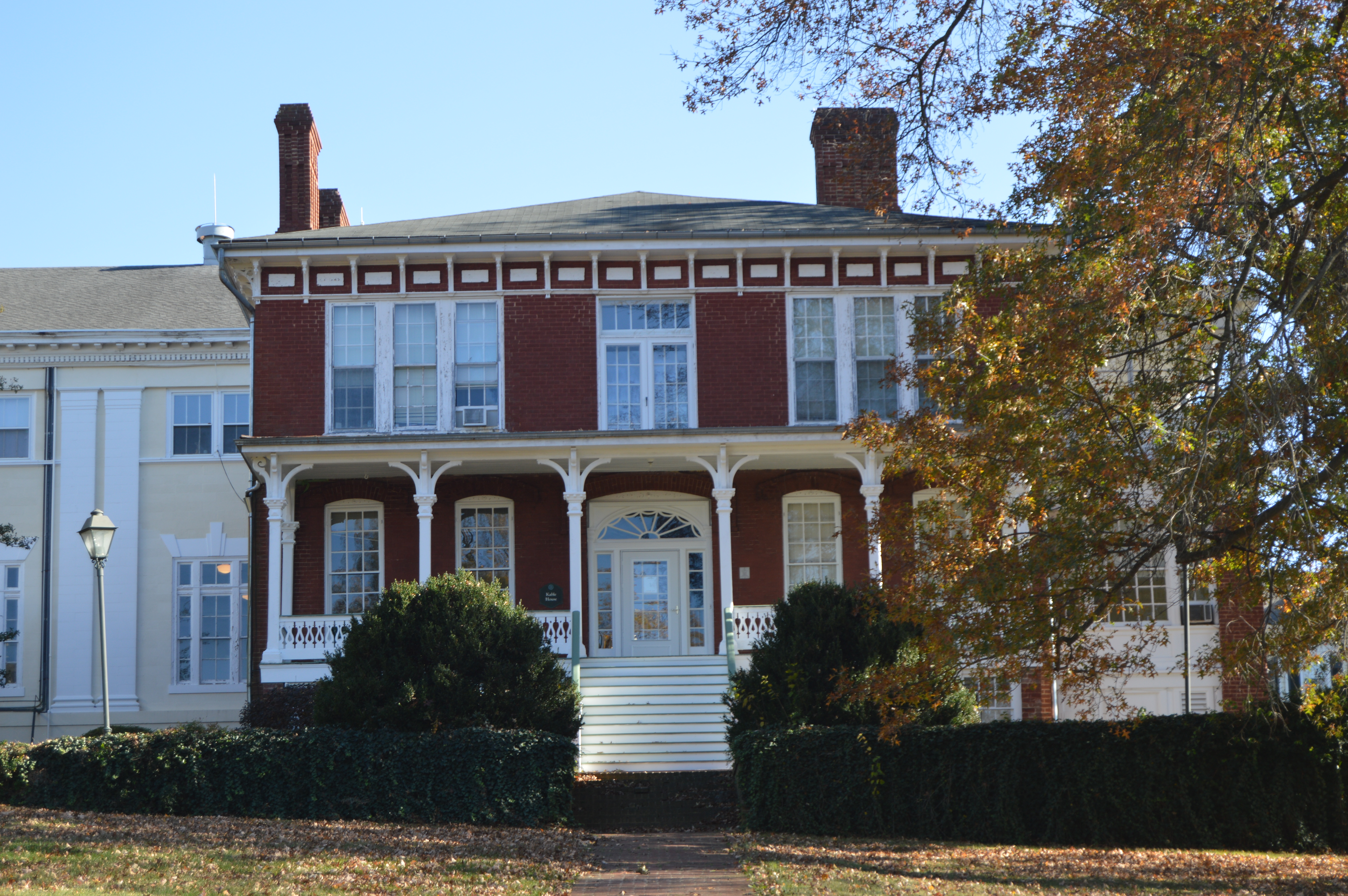
- Front of the house

- Location within Virginia Location within the United States
- Location: 310 Prospect St., Staunton, VA
- Coordinates: 38°9′14″N 79°4′9″W
- Area: 1 acre (0.40 ha) or less
- Built: 1873
- Architect: T.J. Collins & Son
- Architectural style: Italianate
- NRHP reference No.: 79003299
- VLR No.: 132-0022

Significant dates
- Added to NRHP: June 19, 1979
- Designated VLR: December 19, 1978

The Kable House is an Italianate building from 1873 on the Mary Baldwin University campus. It was added to the National Register of Historic Places on June 19, 1979. It is a two-story, five-bay brick house on a raised basement.

Construction started in 1873, and was completed in 1874, for John W. Alby. In 1884, Captain William Hartman Kable purchased the house and opened the Staunton Male Academy (which was renamed again in 1886 to Staunton Military Academy, at the same location) in the building.

The house was remodeled in 1917 by T.J. Collins architectural firm, and added indoor plumbing and a kitchen, as well as some modifications to the exterior.

Staunton Military Academy continued to operate until 1976, at which time the building was purchased by Mary Baldwin College.
