= Breezy Hill =

Historic house in Virginia, United States

- U.S. National Register of Historic Places
- Virginia Landmarks Register
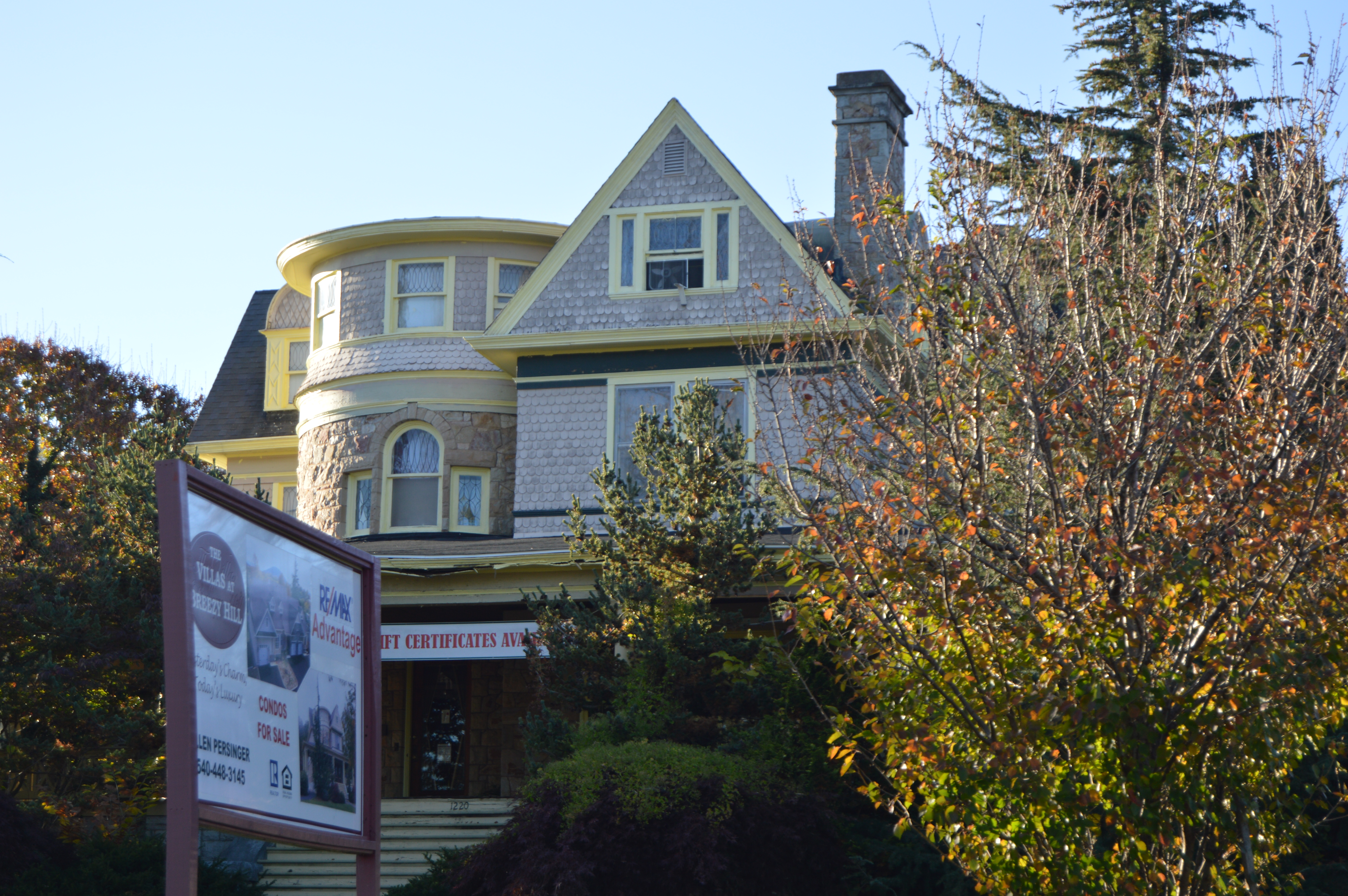
- Front of the house

- Location within Virginia Location within the United States
- Location: U.S. 250 and VA 254, Staunton, Virginia
- Coordinates: 38°8′57″N 79°4′22″W
- Area: 3 acres (1.2 ha)
- Built: 1896-1909
- Architect: T.J. Collins
- Architectural style: Queen Anne, Shingle Style
- NRHP reference No.: 82004599
- VLR No.: 132-0030

Significant dates
- Added to NRHP: July 8, 1982
- Designated VLR: February 16, 1982

Breezy Hill is a villa in Staunton, Virginia. It was listed on the National Register of Historic Places (NRHP) in 1982. It was designed by T.J. Collins, and construction lasted from 1896 to 1909 under the supervision of its owner, Mrs. Thomas P. Grasty. It has about 30 rooms and is built with a blending of Queen Anne and Victorian style architecture. It is a three-story, two-bay structure on a sloping, three acre lot, and is constructed of limestone, fieldstone, and patterned shingles, on a foundation of coursed limestone.

The south bay is a turret with two Palladian windows on the second floor and includes the main entrance, and the north bay has a projecting gable. The lower story is uncoursed fieldstone, as is the second story of the turret bay. The remainder is fish scale shingles, unpainted and weathered. A one-story verandah with coupled Ionic columns and a balustrade with lattice-style railing wraps three sides of the structure, with a flight of steps in the front-center.

Its historical significance is in its unique architecture, as well as its history.
