= Thomas J. Michie House =

Historic house in Virginia, United States

- U.S. National Register of Historic Places
- U.S. Historic district – Contributing property
- Virginia Landmarks Register
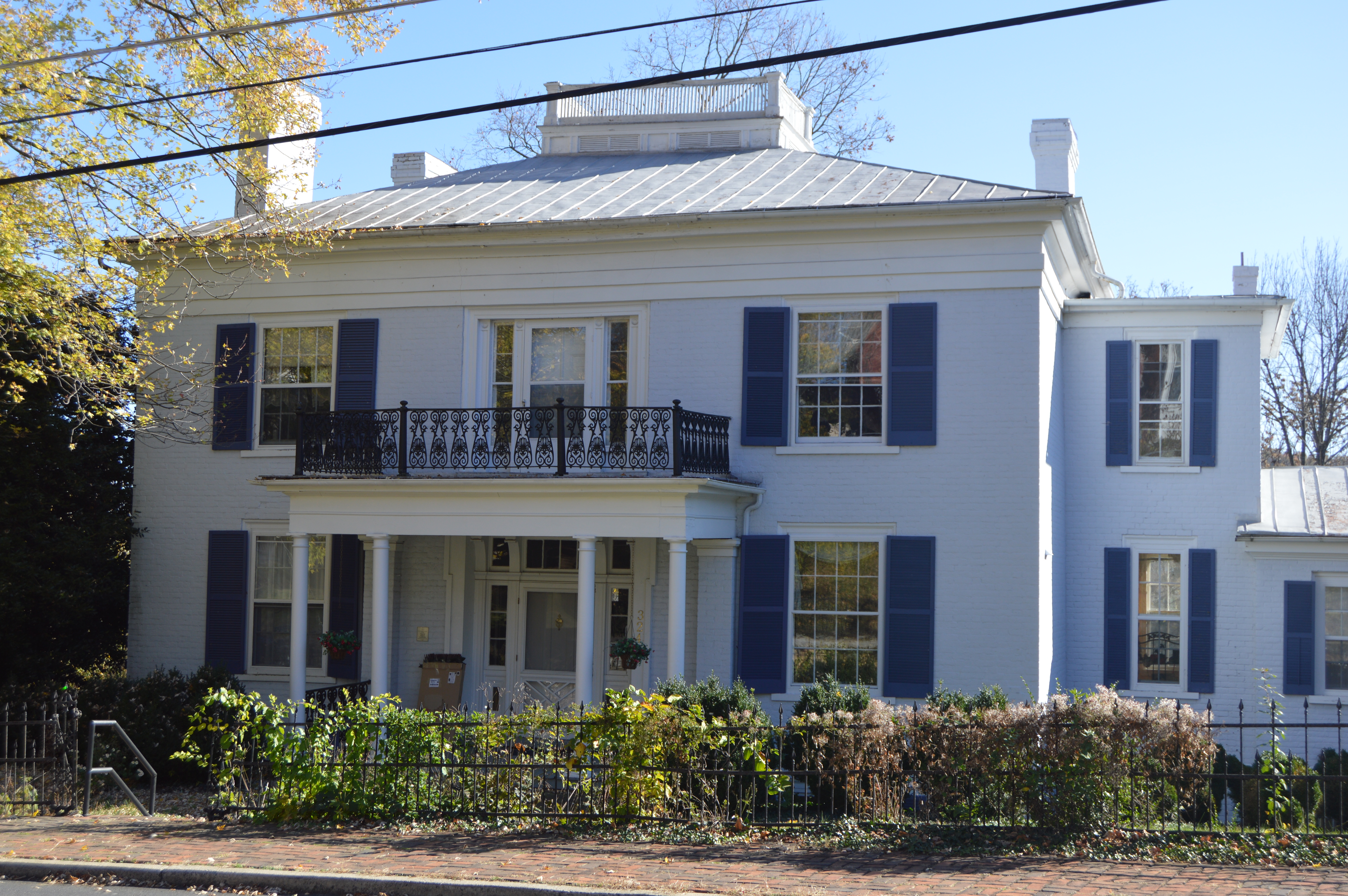
- Front of the house

- Location within Virginia Location within the United States
- Location: 324 E. Beverley St., Staunton, Virginia
- Coordinates: 38°8′59″N 79°4′3″W
- Area: 1.2 acres (0.49 ha)
- Built: 1847-1848
- Architectural style: Greek Revival
- Part of: Gospel Hill Historic District (ID85000299)
- NRHP reference No.: 82004603
- VLR No.: 132-0033

Significant dates
- Added to NRHP: September 9, 1982
- Designated CP: February 14, 1985
- Designated VLR: July 20, 1982

Thomas J. Michie House is a historic home located at Staunton, Virginia. It was built in 1847–1848, and is a three-story, three-bay, Greek Revival style brick dwelling with a two-story wing. The total size is 7,100 square feet. The front facade features a one-story, flat-roofed entrance porch supported by four slender Tuscan order columns. The interior has two elaborate country Federal mantels taken from a nearby 1820 country home. It was built by Thomas J. Michie, who represented Augusta County in the Virginia House of Delegates and may be of the same family that built Michie's Tavern in Charlottesville, Virginia as well as Michie Stadium at West Point Military Academy. It was later the home of jurist Allen Caperton Braxton (1862-1914) and Henry W. Holt (1864-1947) who was the Chief Justice of the Virginia Supreme Court.

It was added to the National Register of Historic Places in 1982. It is located in the Gospel Hill Historic District.
