= Gospel Hill Historic District =

Historic district in Virginia, United States

- U.S. National Register of Historic Places
- U.S. Historic district
- Virginia Landmarks Register
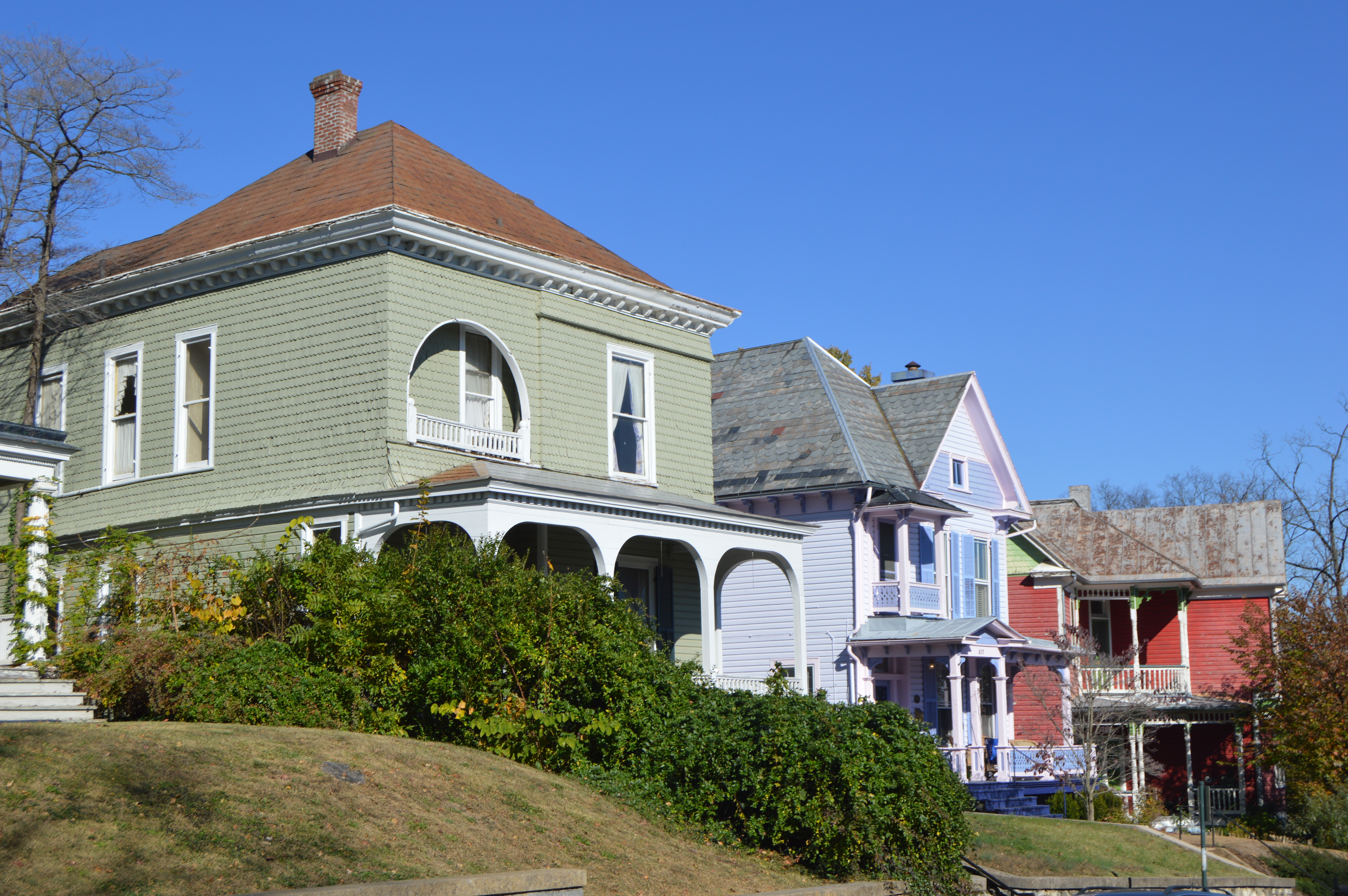
- Houses on Berkeley Place

- Location within Virginia Location within the United States
- Location: Roughly bounded by E. Beverly, N. Market, E. Frederick and Kalorama Sts., Staunton, Virginia
- Coordinates: 38°9′6″N 79°4′1″W
- Area: 68.1 acres (27.6 ha)
- Architect: T.J. Collins & Sons, et al.
- Architectural style: Late 19th And 20th Century Revivals, Late Victorian
- NRHP reference No.: 85000299
- VLR No.: 132-0035

Significant dates
- Added to NRHP: February 14, 1985
- Designated VLR: January 17, 1984

Gospel Hill Historic District is a national historic district located at Staunton, Virginia. The district encompasses 180 contributing buildings in a primarily residential section of Staunton. The district is characterized by an abundance of fine homes, ranging in size from cottages to mansions and dating from 1840 to 1930. It was added to the National Register of Historic Places in 1985.

== Contributing properties ==
The buildings include distinguished examples of a century of architectural styles from Greek Revival to Bungalow. Notable buildings include "Kalorama" (c. 1800), "Capote" (1905), Effinger House (c. 1898), and Temple House of Israel (1925). Located in the district are the separately listed Woodrow Wilson Birthplace, Catlett House, Arista Hoge House, J. C. M. Merrillat House, Thomas J. Michie House, Oakdene, and The Oaks.
