= J. C. M. Merrillat House =

Historic house in Virginia, United States

- U.S. National Register of Historic Places
- U.S. Historic district – Contributing property
- Virginia Landmarks Register
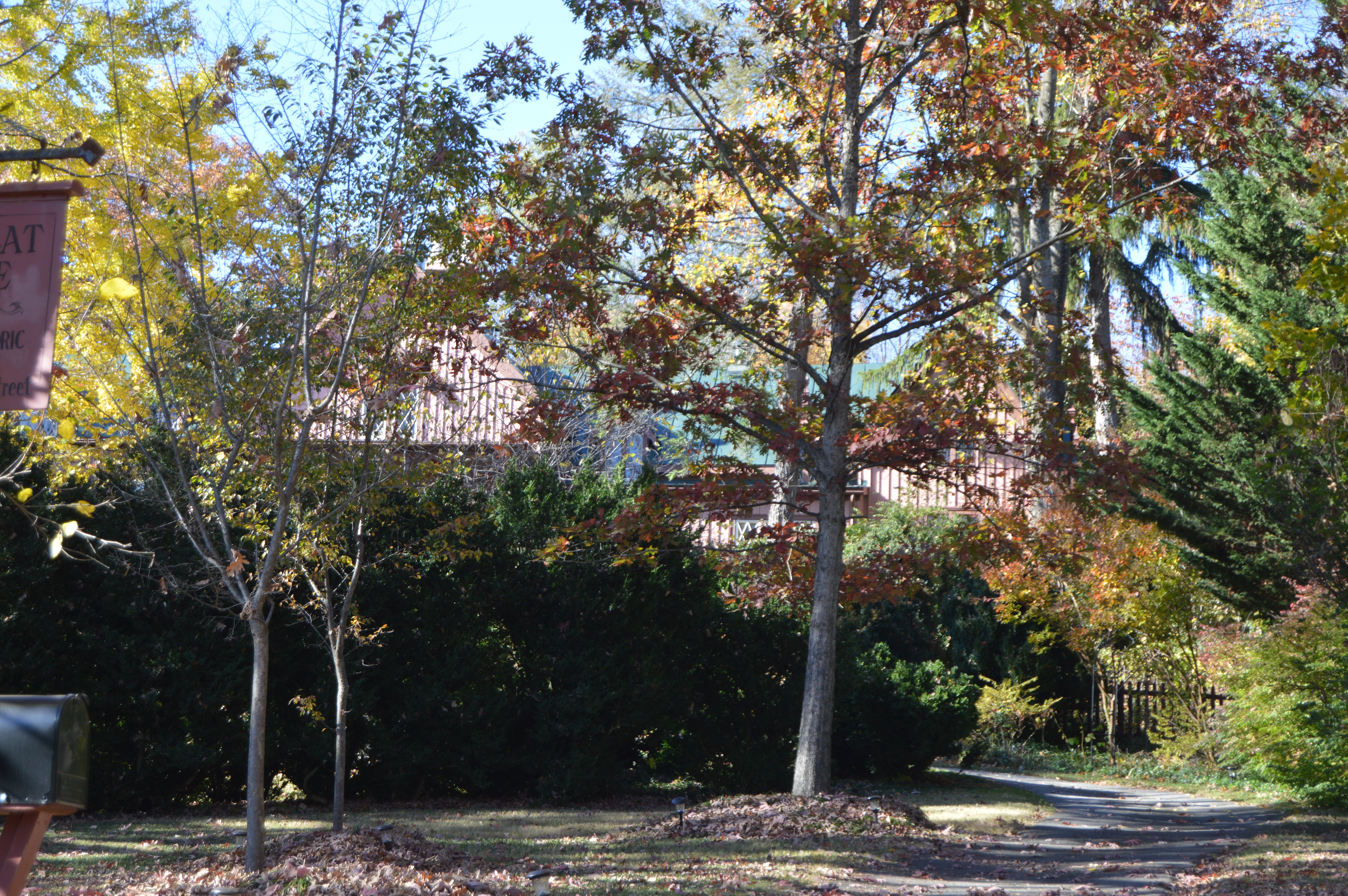
- Front of the house

- Location within Virginia Location within the United States
- Location: 521 E. Beverley St., Staunton, Virginia
- Coordinates: 38°9′7″N 79°3′57″W
- Area: 2.1 acres (0.85 ha)
- Built: 1851
- Architectural style: Gothic Revival
- Part of: Gospel Hill Historic District (ID85000299)
- NRHP reference No.: 82004602
- VLR No.: 132-0028

Significant dates
- Added to NRHP: September 16, 1982
- Designated CP: February 14, 1985
- Designated VLR: September 15, 1981

J. C. M. Merrillat House, also known as Hunter House, is a historic house located at Staunton, Virginia. It was built in 1851, and is a two-story, five-bay, Gothic Revival style frame cottage with a two-story wing. It has board-and-batten siding and a gable roof interrupted by a large central gable with a finial. The front facade features a one-story porch supported by large brackets. It was built by Dr. J. C. M. Merrillat, a prominent early administrator at the nearby Virginia School for the Deaf and Blind.

It was added to the National Register of Historic Places in 1982. It is located in the Gospel Hill Historic District.
