= Cobble Hill Farm =

- U.S. National Register of Historic Places
- Virginia Landmarks Register
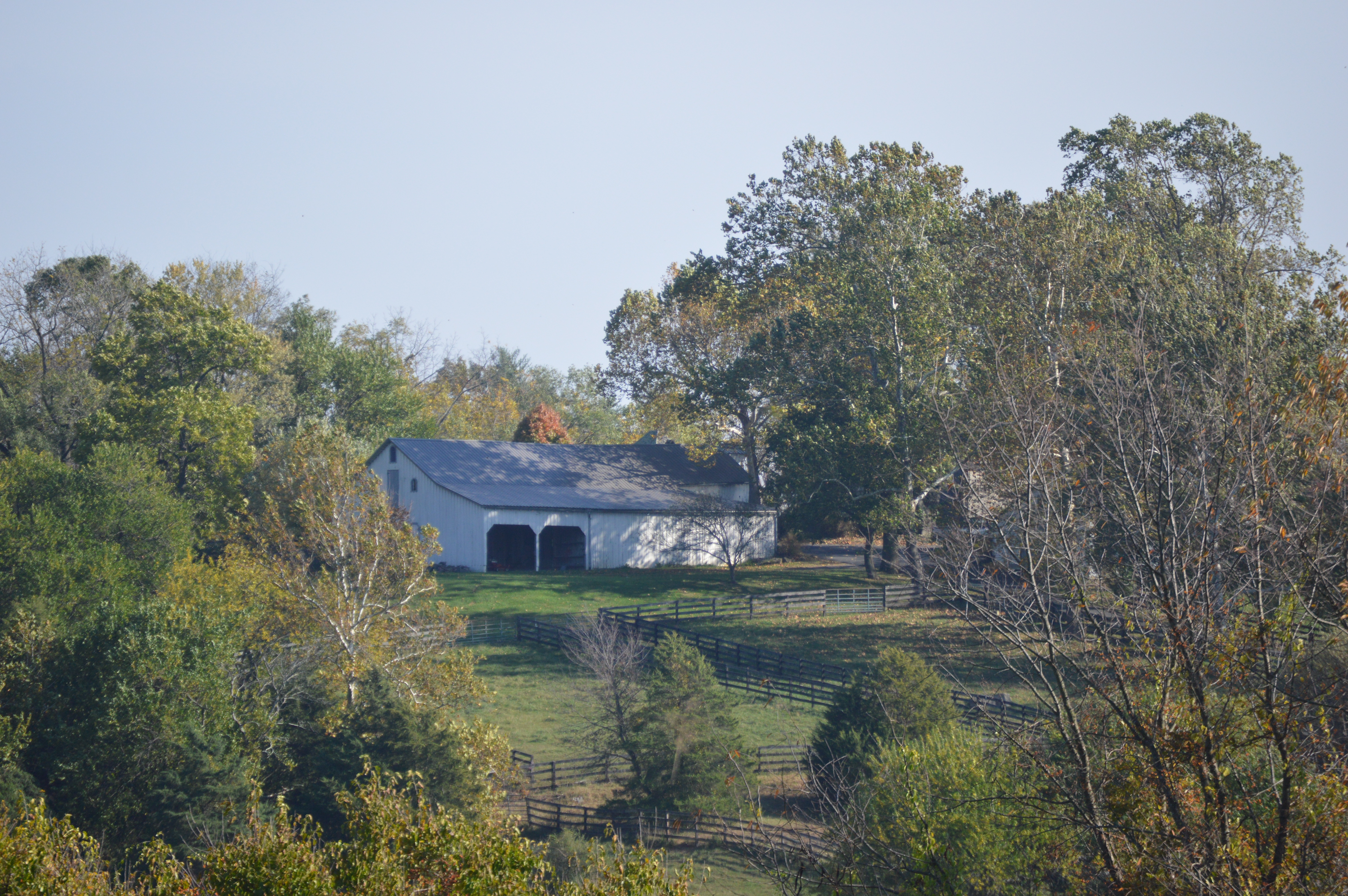
- Distant view of one of the barns

- Location within Virginia Location within the United States
- Location: 101 Woodlee Rd., Staunton, Virginia
- Coordinates: 38°10′31″N 79°4′4″W
- Area: 196 acres (79 ha)
- Built: 1937
- Architect: Sam Collins; T.J. Collins and Sons
- Architectural style: Tudor Revival, French Eclectic
- NRHP reference No.: 04000105
- VLR No.: 132-5013

Significant dates
- Added to NRHP: June 19, 1979
- Designated VLR: December 3, 2003

Cobble Hill Farm is a 196-acre farm in Staunton, Virginia. It was listed on the National Register of Historic Places (NRHP) in 2004. It is composed of three parcels: two tenant farms and the Cobble Hill parcel. The Cobble Hill house is a 2 1/2-story masonry house with a steep-gabled roof, with accents in the Tudor Revival and French Eclectic styles, with a formal garden and pool. It has a one-story, side-gabled porch, with a large, coursed-stone chimney near the entry porch. The roof surfaces are all finished with wood shingles. The building was designed in 1936 by Sam Collins, and built in 1937 for William Ewing's widow.

One of the tenant farms lies across the street and is accessed from Woodlee Rd., and contains a frame, two-story, three-bay, center hall plan vernacular farmhouse, plus several outbuildings, with 46 acres of land. The second tenant farm consists of a frame, side-gabled, three-bay, 2 1/2-story I house with an ell addition, and sits on 63 acres of farm land.

Cobble Hill Farm has several contributing sites and structures, including a garden, pool, shed complex, dairy and feed barns, a summerhouse, a tower, and the buildings of the tenant parcels.

It is still a functional farm, producing sheep and hay. Its area of historical significance is in architecture and engineering.
