= National Valley Bank =

Historic commercial building in Virginia, United States

- U.S. National Register of Historic Places
- U.S. Historic district – Contributing property
- Virginia Landmarks Register
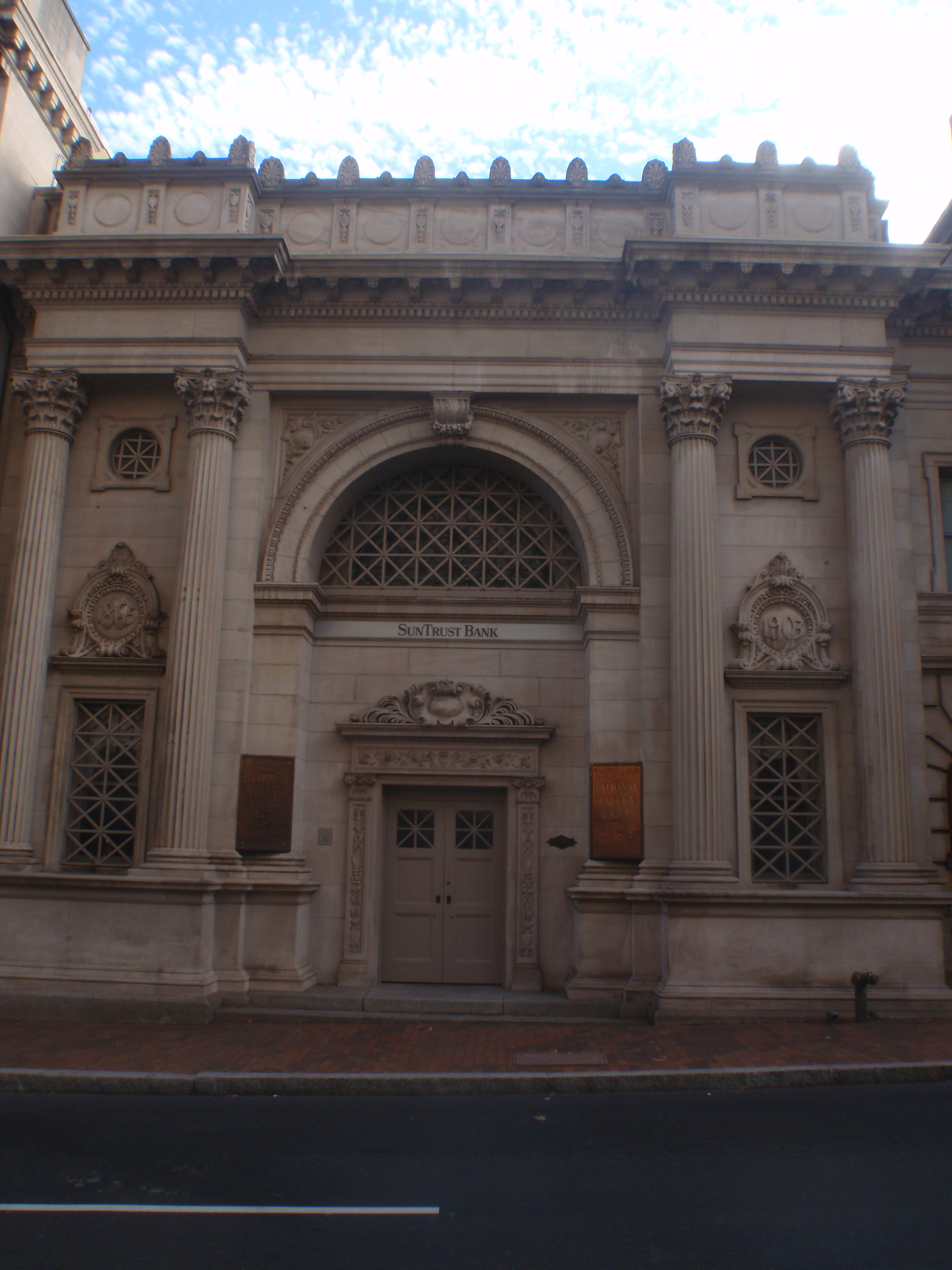
- National Valley Bank, December 2011

- Location within Virginia Location within the United States
- Location: 12-14 W. Beverly St., Staunton, Virginia
- Coordinates: 38°8′57″N 79°4′24″W
- Area: less than one acre
- Built: 1903
- Architect: Collins, T.J. & Son
- Architectural style: Beaux Arts
- NRHP reference No.: 79003301
- VLR No.: 132-0023

Significant dates
- Added to NRHP: June 19, 1979
- Designated VLR: December 19, 1978

National Valley Bank, also known as United Virginia Bank, is a historic bank building located in Staunton, Virginia. It was built in 1903 and is a one-story, three-bay, Beaux Arts-style building constructed of granite, brick and carved limestone. Its design was based on the Roman Arch of Titus. It features semi-engaged, fluted columns of the Corinthian order flanking the central entrance. The interior features a coffered plaster ceiling. General John Echols (1823-1896) founded the bank in 1865 and served as its first president. His son Edward Echols, who built Oakdene, served as the National Valley Bank's third president from 1905–1915.

It was added to the National Register of Historic Places in 1979. It is located in the Beverley Historic District.
