= Catlett House (Staunton, Virginia) =

Historic house in Virginia, United States

- U.S. National Register of Historic Places
- U.S. Historic district – Contributing property
- Virginia Landmarks Register
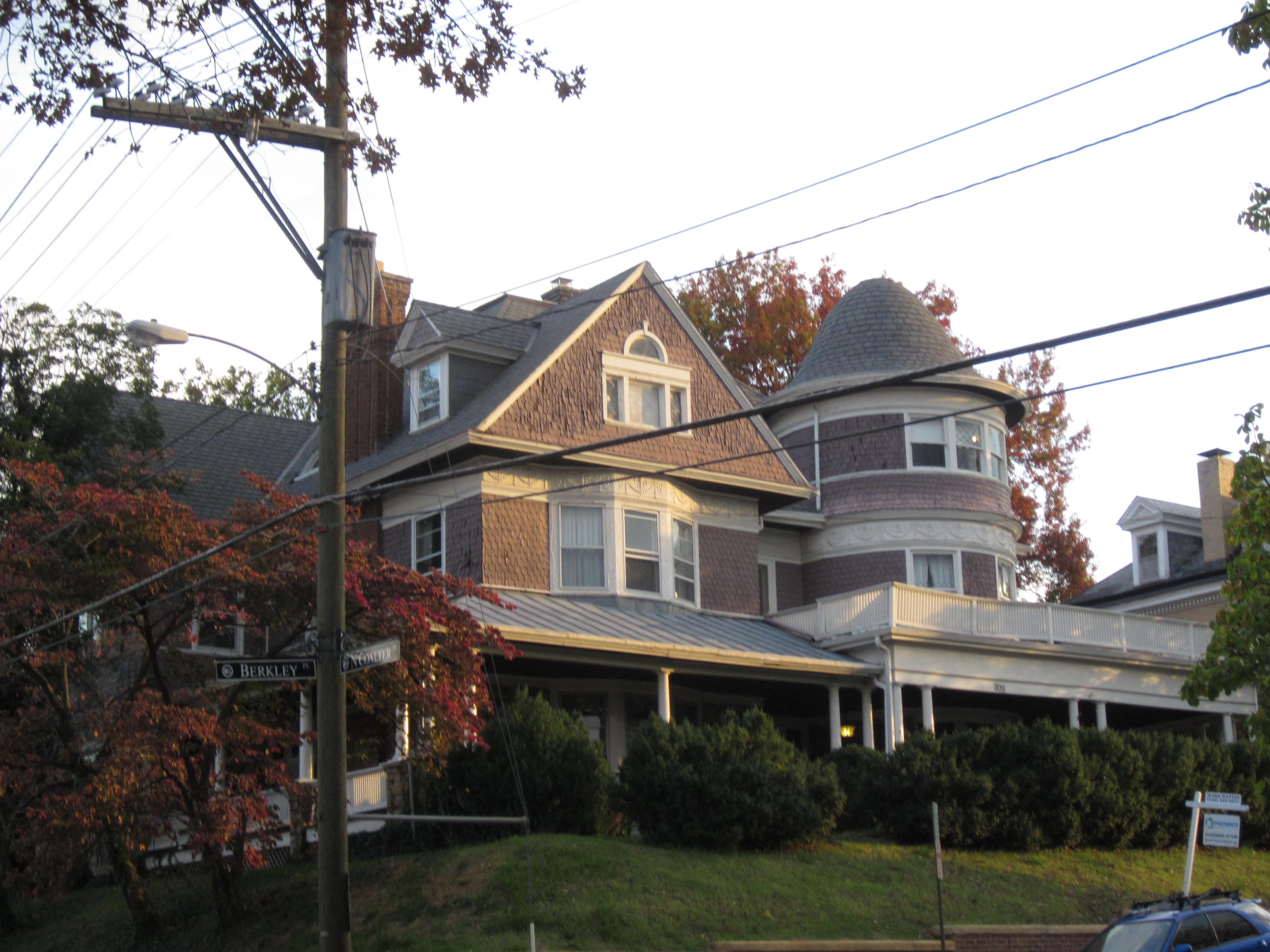
- Front facade of the Catlett House

- Location within Virginia Location within the United States
- Location: 303 Berkeley Pl. Staunton, Virginia
- Coordinates: 38°9′2″N 79°4′7″W
- Area: 1 acre (0.40 ha) or less
- Built: 1897
- Architectural style: Queen Anne
- Part of: Gospel Hill Historic District (ID85000299)
- NRHP reference No.: 82004600
- VLR No.: 132-0032

Significant dates
- Added to NRHP: July 15, 1982
- Designated CP: February 14, 1985
- Designated VLR: May 18, 1982

The Catlett House is a detached Queen Anne style building from 1897 in Staunton, Virginia. It was listed on the National Register of Historic Places (NRHP) in 1982. It is located in the Gospel Hill Historic District. Construction was begun in 1896 by R.H. Catlett, who died in the same year, and completed in 1897 for his widow, Fannie Catlett.

The three-story, three-bay building is on a raised corner lot in the city's Gospel Hill neighborhood. It has shingled outer walls on the two upper floors, with rough-faced stone on the foundation and first floor. It has a hipped and gable roof with large projecting gables and a rounded tower, which has a bell shaped roof with dark brown shingles. The front facade is split into three bays, with a projecting gable and a round turret on the ends, connected by a plain central bay. The ground floor has a wide verandah wrapping three sides of the house. It has nine fireplaces, and twenty-one leaded glass windows on the first floor. The house, formerly used as a retirement home for women is now the Berkeley House Bed & Breakfast.

Its significance in the NRHP is due to its architecture.
