= Arista Hoge House =

Historic house in Virginia, United States

- U.S. National Register of Historic Places
- U.S. Historic district – Contributing property
- Virginia Landmarks Register
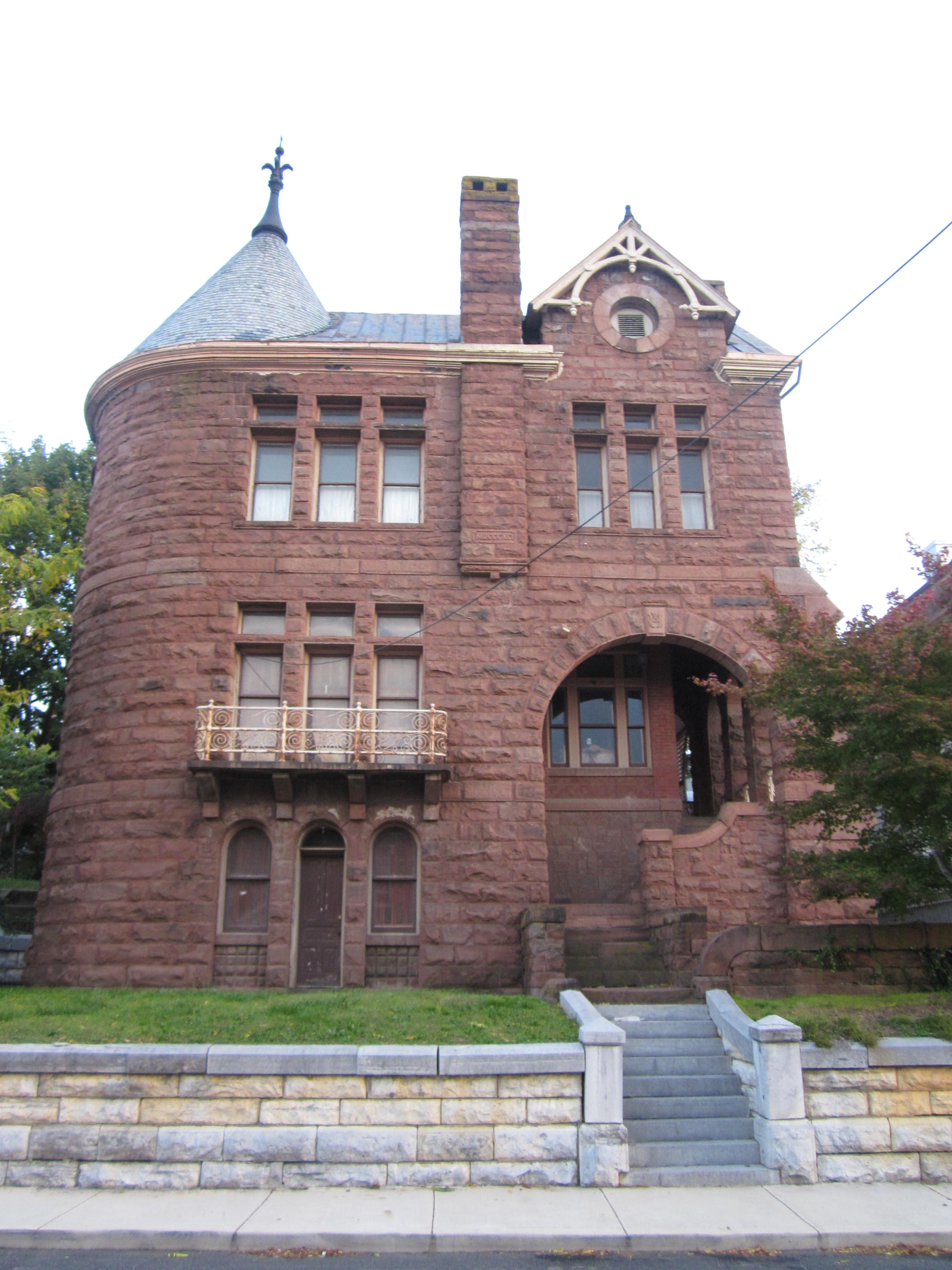
- Front facade of the Arista Hoge House

- Location within Virginia Location within the United States
- Location: 215 Kalorama Street, Staunton, Virginia
- Coordinates: 38°8′54″N 79°4′13″W
- Area: 0.2 acres (0.081 ha)
- Built: 1882
- Architectural style: Richardsonian Romanesque
- Part of: Gospel Hill Historic District (ID85000299)
- NRHP reference No.: 82004601
- VLR No.: 132-0015

Significant dates
- Added to NRHP: 1982
- Designated CP: February 14, 1985
- Designated VLR: May 18, 1982

The Arista Hoge House (also known as Kalorama Castle) in Staunton, Virginia is a private residence first built in 1882, with a massive and historically significant facade added in 1891. It was listed on the National Register of Historic Places (NRHP) in 1982. It is located in the Gospel Hill Historic District. Its historic significance lies in its unique architecture

A Richardsonian Romanesque style facade of rough-cut brownstone with a metal gabled roof was added to the existing Italianate Style house. The facade is a two-bay, two-story structure with a full basement, while the main building is only two stories. The two bays of the facade are separated by a central stone chimney. The western side wall of the facade forms a rounded turret with a conical slate roof, and each story has triple one-by-one windows, round-headed on the lowest level and square-headed on the upper two floors. The eastern bay also has the triple windows motif, topped by a gable end with a round window. The front steps are on the east wall and recessed under an archway. The door has stained-glass panels and its landing is laid with colored tiles.

The original building is brick Italianate, with a porch addition built in the 1890s, around the same time the facade was built.

The building was deemed worthy of historical recognition as an example of the changing tastes in local architecture in the late 19th century, being a brick Italianate main house, with a Romanesque facade, a Queen Anne style side-porch and a western Colonial Revival porch.
