= Oakdene (Staunton, Virginia) =

Historic house in Virginia, United States

- U.S. National Register of Historic Places
- U.S. Historic district – Contributing property
- Virginia Landmarks Register
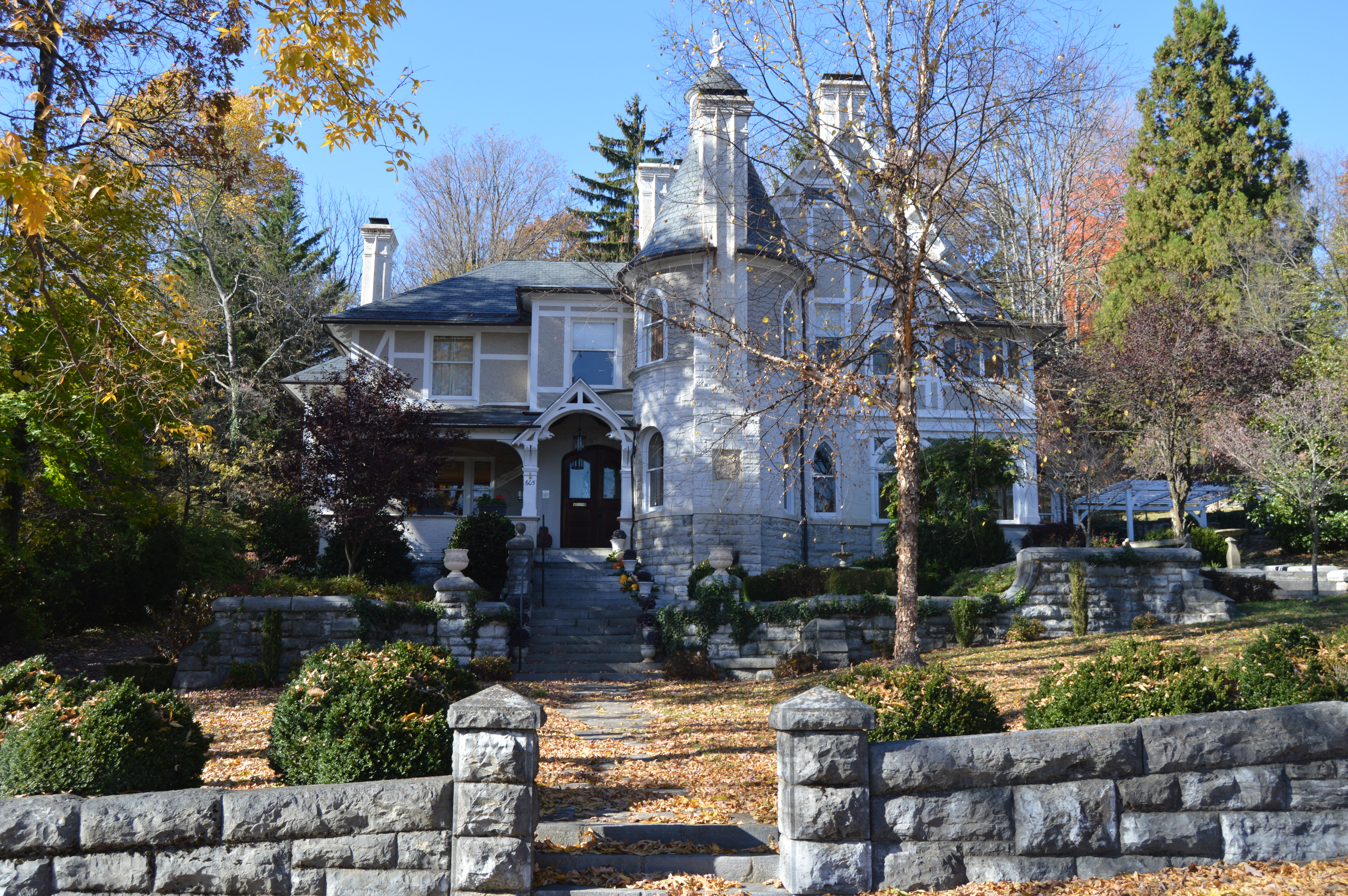
- Front of the house

- Location within Virginia Location within the United States
- Location: 605 E. Beverley St., Staunton, Virginia
- Coordinates: 38°9′7″N 79°3′54″W
- Area: less than one acre
- Built: 1893
- Architectural style: Queen Anne
- Part of: Gospel Hill Historic District (ID85000299)
- NRHP reference No.: 82001827
- VLR No.: 132-0027

Significant dates
- Added to NRHP: November 24, 1982
- Designated CP: February 14, 1985
- Designated VLR: September 15, 1981

Oakdene is a historic home located at Staunton, Virginia. It was built in 1893, and is a large 2 1/2-story, Queen Anne style frame dwelling with an irregular plan. It has a great variety of textures and materials, and features a carved entrance porch, a central turret with a chimney up the middle two sun porches, several tall chimneys with elaborately corbelled caps and decorative brickwork, and a turret with a conical roof. The main roof is of slate and is composed of both hipped and gabled elements. Oakdene was built for Edward Echols, who served as lieutenant governor of Virginia from 1898 to 1902 and was president of the local National Valley Bank. His father General John Echols died at Oakdene in 1896.

It was added to the National Register of Historic Places in 1982. It is located in the Gospel Hill Historic District.
