= Beverley Historic District =

Historic district in Virginia, United States

- U.S. National Register of Historic Places
- U.S. Historic district
- Virginia Landmarks Register
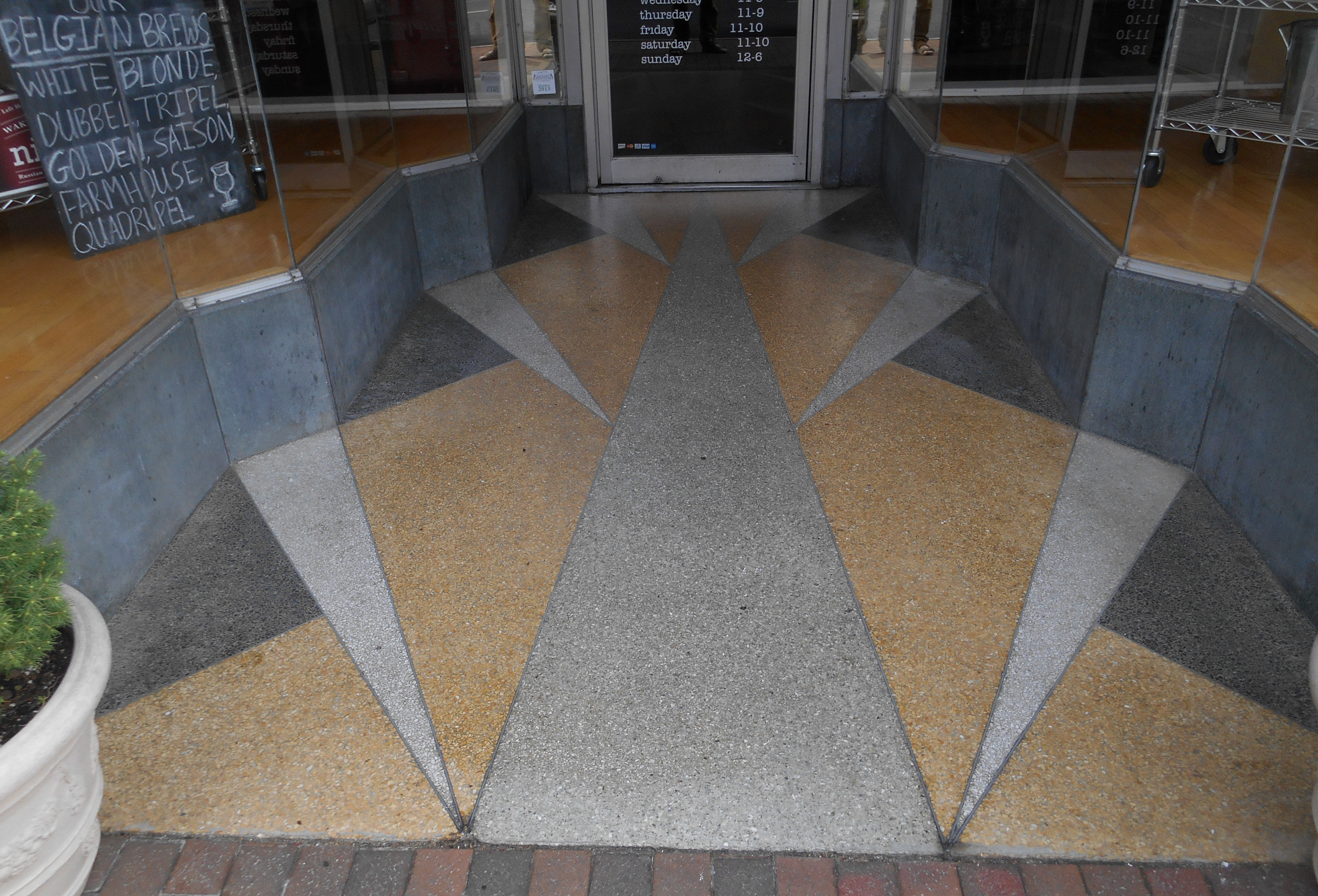
- Terrazzo entryway on Beverley Street

- Location within Virginia Location within the United States
- Location: U.S. 250 and VA 254, Staunton, Virginia
- Coordinates: 38°8′57″N 79°4′22″W
- Area: 30 acres (12 ha)
- Architect: Collins, T.J.; Et al.
- Architectural style: Italianate, Romanesque
- NRHP reference No.: 82004598
- VLR No.: 132-0024

Significant dates
- Added to NRHP: July 14, 1982
- Designated VLR: November 20, 1979

Beverley Historic District is a national historic district located at Staunton, Virginia. The district encompasses 131 contributing buildings in downtown Staunton. It is a compact commercial district characterized by a well-preserved collection of 19th-century buildings. The buildings are characteristically two- to four-story, brick structures in a variety of popular architectural styles including Romanesque Revival and primarily Italianate. Notable buildings include the old YMCA (1890), Hoover House Hotel (1893-1894), Putnam Organ Works Store (1894), City Hall (c. 1877, 1927), Odd Fellows Hall (c. 1895), U.S. Post Office (1936), and the Masonic Temple building (1895-1896). Located in the district are the separately listed National Valley Bank and the former Augusta County Courthouse.

It was added to the National Register of Historic Places in 1982.
