= Mary Baldwin =

Mary Baldwin may refer to:

- Mary-Ann Baldwin (born 1956/1957), American marketing executive and politician
- Mary Briscoe Baldwin (1811–1877), American missionary educator
- Mary Julia Baldwin (1829–1897), American educator after whom Mary Baldwin University is named
- Mary Wilson, Baroness Wilson of Rievaulx (née Baldwin, 1916–2018), English poet and the wife of Harold Wilson
- Mary Baldwin Hyde (1867–1938), American wife of Sidney Dillon Ripley I
- Mary Baldwin University, American private women's university
