= Rose Terrace (Staunton, Virginia) =

Historic building in Virginia, US

- Mary Baldwin University, Rose Terrace
- U.S. National Register of Historic Places
- Virginia Landmarks Register
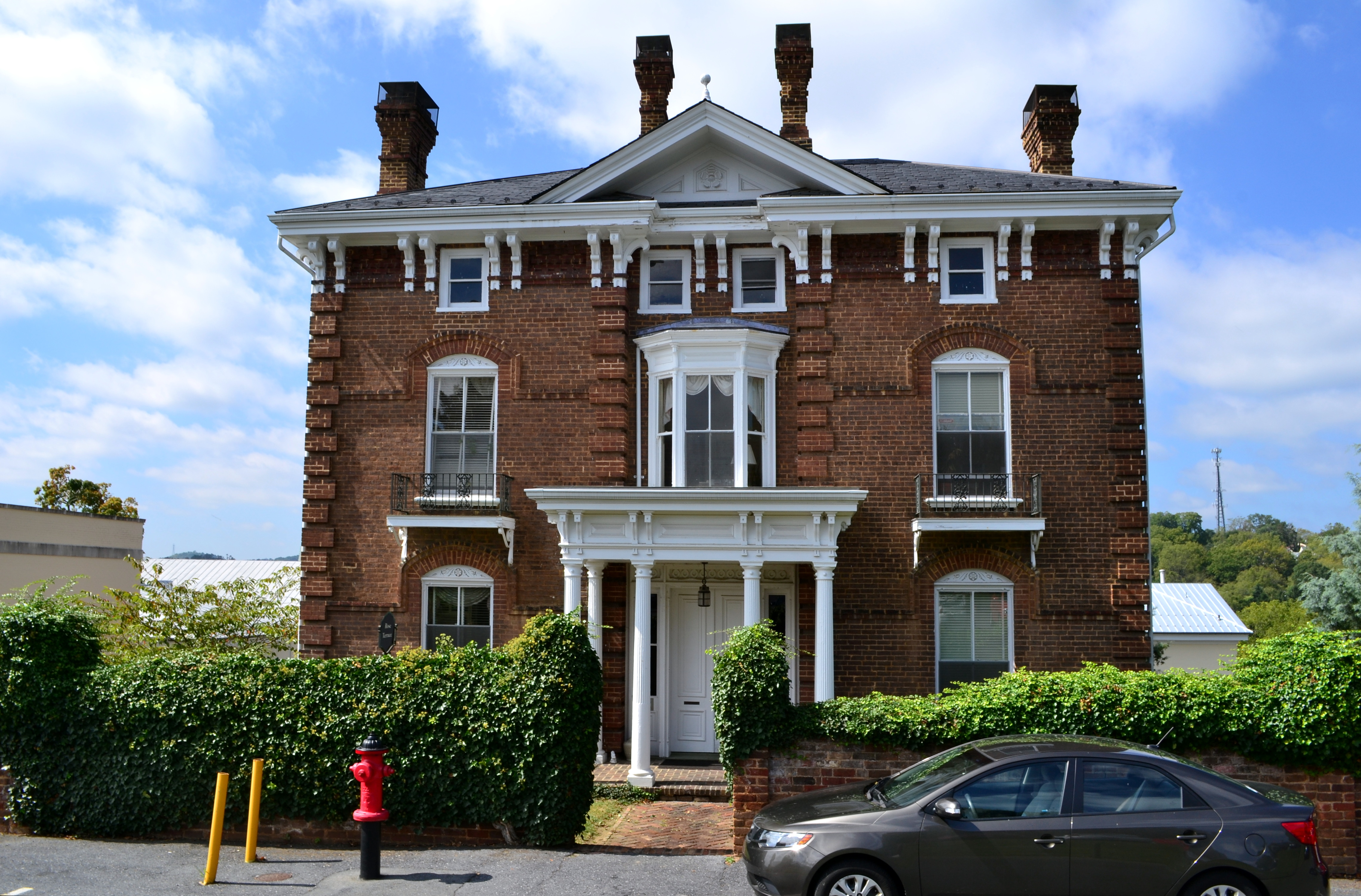

- Location within Virginia Location within the United States
- Location: Mary Baldwin University campus, Staunton, Virginia
- Coordinates: 38°9′8.45″N 79°4′15.55″W
- Area: 1 acre (0.40 ha)
- Built: c. 1875
- Architectural style: Italianate
- NRHP reference No.: 79003303
- VLR No.: 132-0017

Significant dates
- Added to NRHP: June 19, 1979
- Designated VLR: December 19, 1978

The Rose Terrace building is a historic building on the Mary Baldwin University campus in Staunton, Virginia. It was built about 1875, and is a 2 1/2-story, three-bay, L-shaped, brick Italianate-style building. It has a hipped roof and six handsome, tall chimneys with elaborately corbelled caps. Also on the property is a contributing small two-story outbuilding known as "Little House."

Rose Terrace was originally a single family residence, then housed Augusta Sanitarium from 1910 to 1919. The building was purchased by Mary Baldwin College in 1919. It was once used as the college president's home, and also served as a student dormitory. The building currently houses the offices of the Shakespeare & Performance graduate program.

It was listed on the National Register of Historic Places (NRHP) in 1979.

== See also ==
Hilltop, Main, and C. W. Miller House, are other NRHP-listed building on the campus.
