= Lebbeus Bailey =

- Born: May 12, 1763; Hanover, Province of Massachusetts Bay
- Died: December 6, 1827 (aged 64); Barnstable County, Massachusetts, U.S.
- Resting place: Ledge Cemetery, Yarmouth, Maine, U.S.
- Citizenship: United States
- Occupation: Clockmaker

Lebbeus Bailey (May 12, 1763 – December 6, 1827) was an American clockmaker, prominent in the late 18th and early 19th centuries. After setting up his first business in Massachusetts, he came to prominence after moving to North Yarmouth in today's Maine, where he made clocks, sleigh bells and jewelry.

== Life and career ==
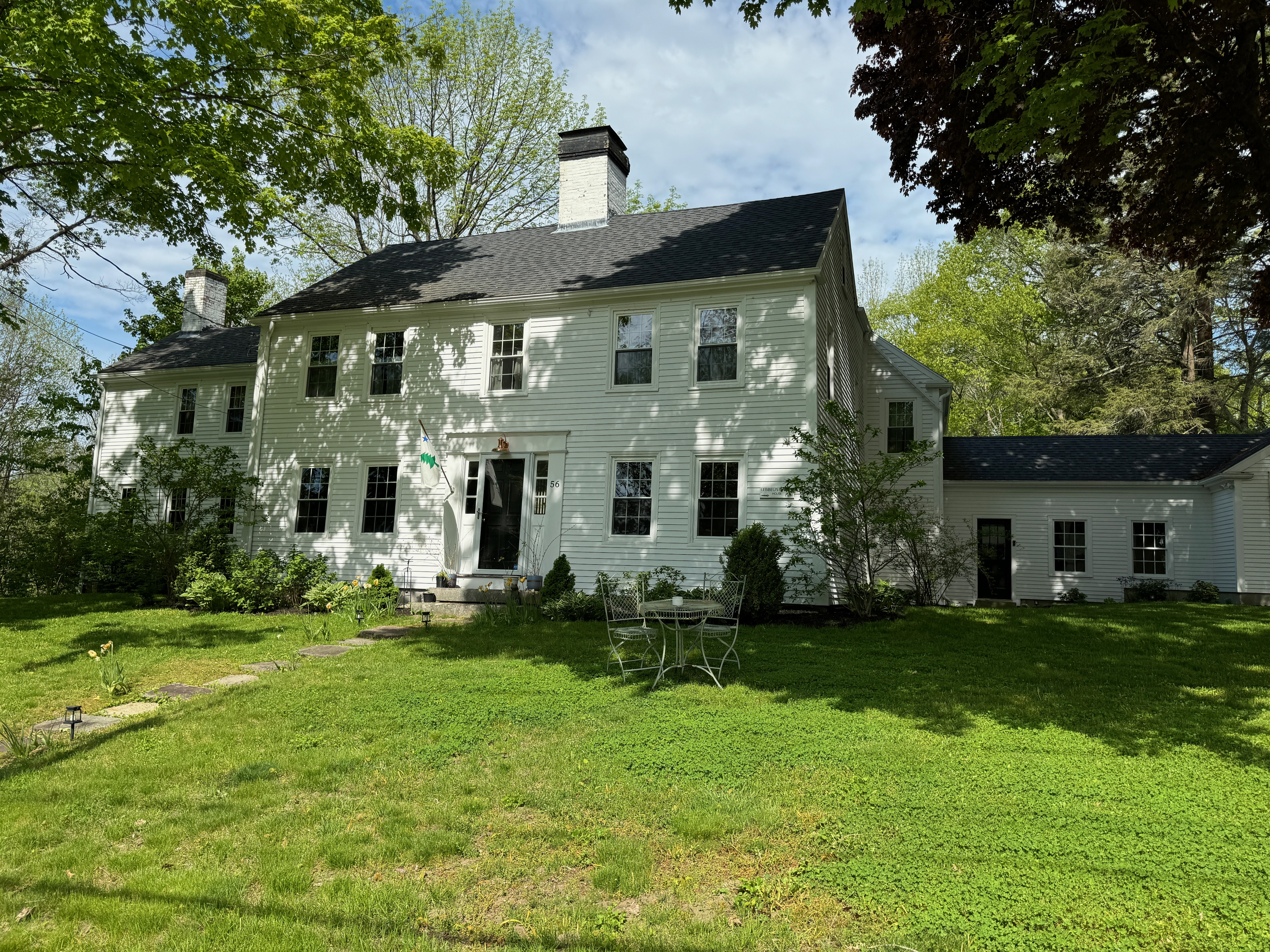
56 East Main Street, in Yarmouth, Maine, now known as the Lebbeus Bailey House

Bailey was born in 1763 in Hanover, Province of Massachusetts Bay, to Colonel John Bailey and Ruth Randall, the sixth of their nine children and one of their four sons. His sister, Ruth, married William Stockbridge, father of merchant William Reed Stockbridge.

After serving an apprenticeship with his older brothers Calvin and John II, Bailey was listed as a clockmaker in his own right in Hanover between 1784 and 1791.

He married Sarah Silvester Myrick on August 22, 1790, in Scituate, Massachusetts. They had eight children: Lebbeus Jr. (born 1791), Rufus William (1793), Mary Myrick (1795), Elizabeth Dawes (1797), Henry (1800), Timothy Myrick (1802), Joseph Stockbridge (1804) and Edward (1807). Rufus became a noted scholar, and founded the Augusta Female Seminary in Staunton, Virginia.

The year following his marriage, he moved north to North Yarmouth, Province of Massachusetts Bay (now Maine). He set up a foundry beside Yarmouth's harbor, in the town's Lower Falls area, in which he produced tall clocks, shelf clocks, "sleigh bells, and in fact every kind of metal work of which his customers had need", noted Yarmouth's town historian William Hutchinson Rowe. He was also a jeweler, and made the medals and jewels that were worn by the local Masons of Casco Bay Lodge. Bailey and his family lived nearby, at today's 56 East Main Street. There, he "always had the best garden in the neighborhood, and the best fruit," noted Revd. Joseph Stockbridge.

Bailey went into business with his son, Lebbeus Jr., in 1816, the company being known as Lebbeus Bailey & Son.

== Death ==
Bailey died in Barnstable, Massachusetts, in 1827, aged 64. His wife survived him by 28 years, and was interred beside him in Yarmouth's Ledge Cemetery.
