= C. W. Miller House =

- U.S. National Register of Historic Places
- U.S. Historic district – Contributing property
- Virginia Landmarks Register
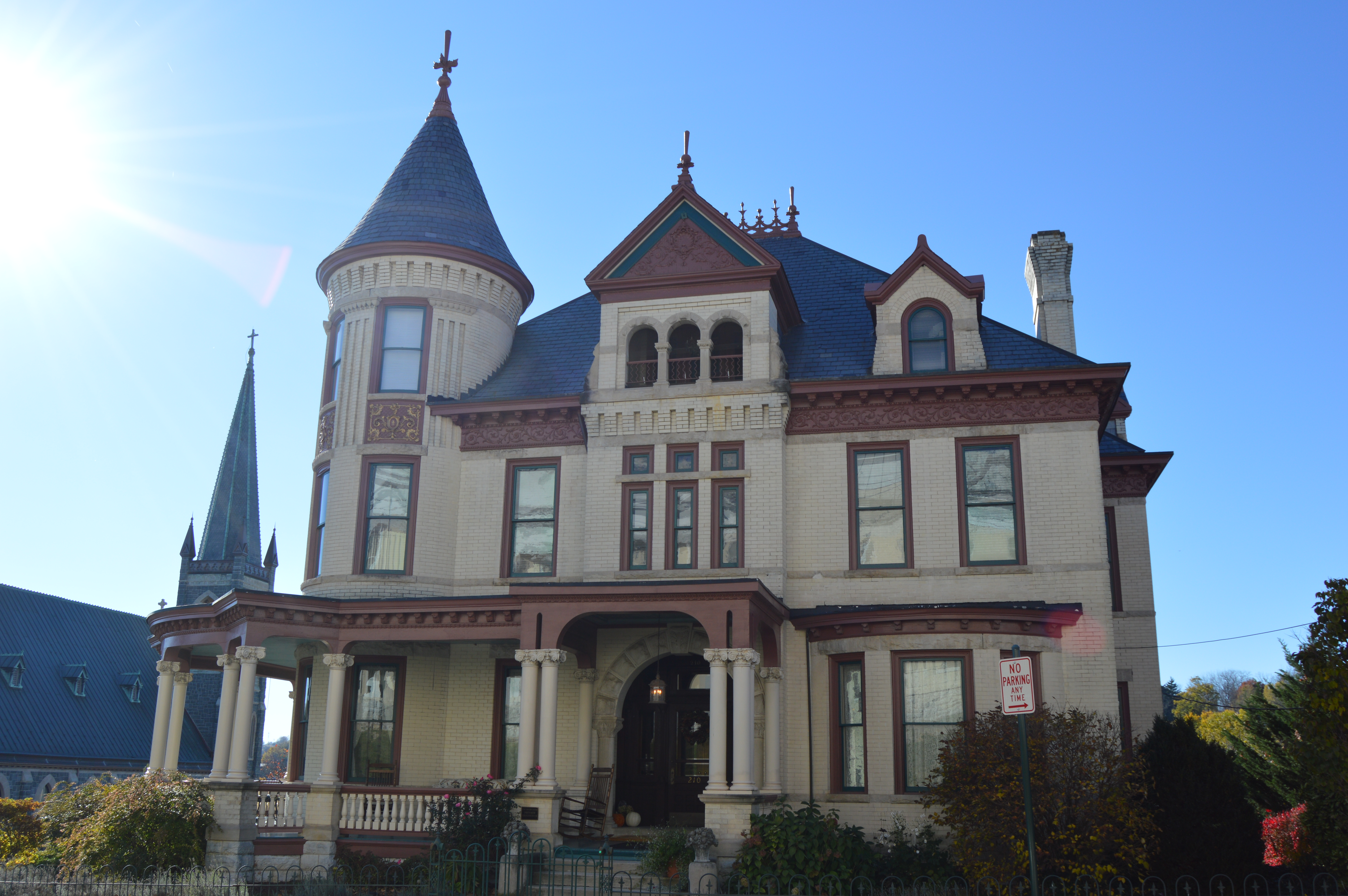
- Front of the house

- Location within Virginia Location within the United States
- Location: 210 N. New St., Staunton, Virginia
- Coordinates: 38°9′7″N 79°4′21″W
- Area: less than one acre
- Built: 1899-1900
- Architect: Collins, T.J.
- Architectural style: Chateauesque
- NRHP reference No.: 79003300
- VLR No.: 132-0018

Significant dates
- Added to NRHP: June 19, 1979
- Designated VLR: December 19, 1978

C. W. Miller House is a historic home located adjacent to the campus of Mary Baldwin University at Staunton, Virginia. It was built in 1899–1900, and is a 2 1/2-story, three-bay, brick and stone building in a Châteauesque / Romanesque Revival style. It features four decorated brick chimneys with elaborately corbelled caps, a one-story wraparound porch, and a three-story round tower at the corner of the house. At one time the house was sold to Mary Baldwin College for the music school, but has since returned to private ownership.

It was added to the National Register of Historic Places in 1979. It is located in the Stuart Addition Historic District.

== See also ==
Hilltop, Main, and Rose Terrace, are other NRHP-listed building on the campus.
