= Hilltop (Staunton, Virginia) =

- U.S. National Register of Historic Places
- Virginia Landmarks Register
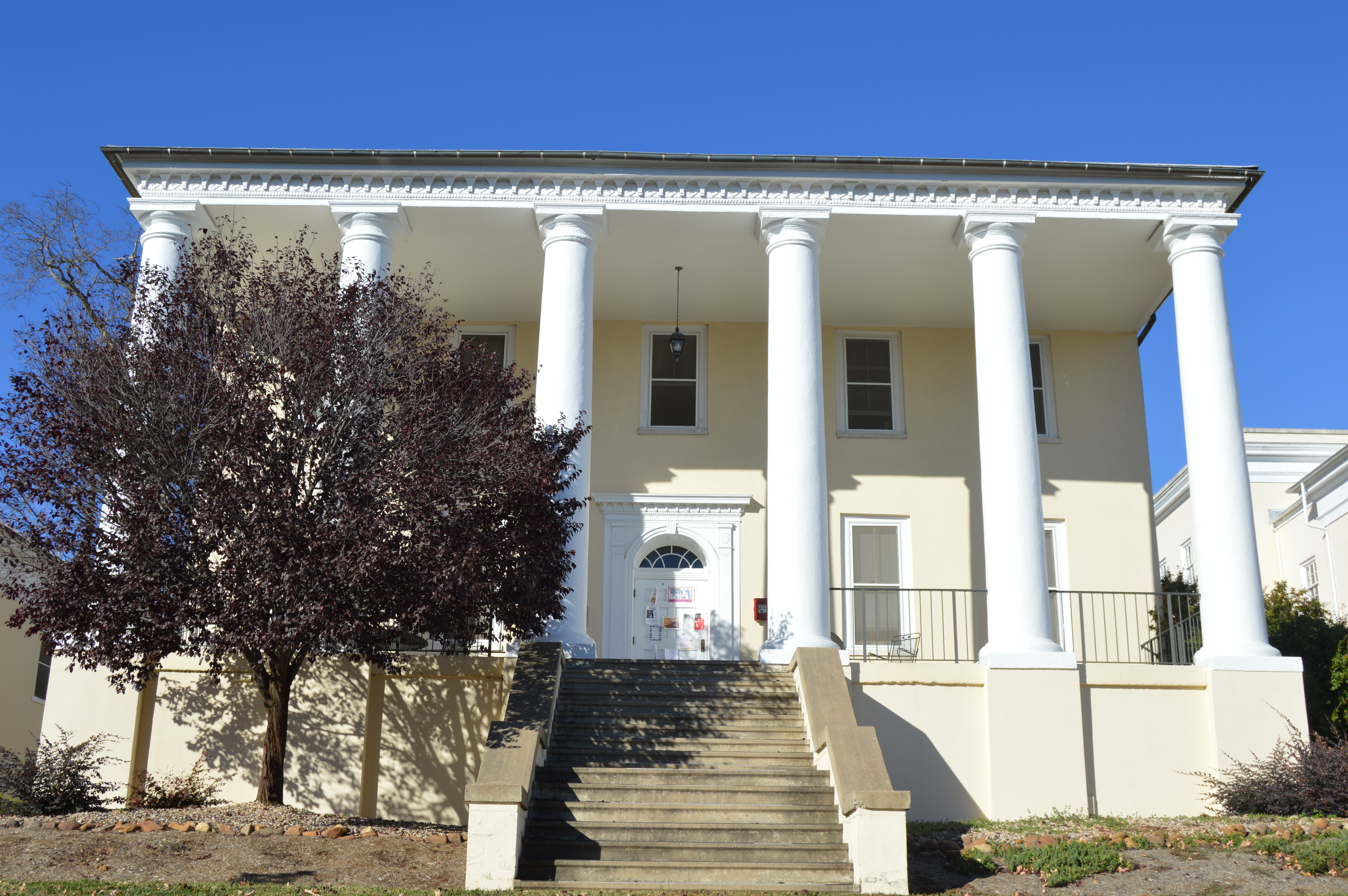
- Looking up toward the facade

- Location within Virginia Location within the United States
- Location: Mary Baldwin University campus, Staunton, Virginia
- Coordinates: 38°9′6″N 79°4′17″W
- Area: Less than 1 acre (0.40 ha)
- Built: c. 1810
- NRHP reference No.: 79003298
- VLR No.: 132-0002

Significant dates
- Added to NRHP: June 19, 1979
- Designated VLR: December 18, 1978

Hilltop is a historic building on the Mary Baldwin University campus in Staunton, Virginia. The original section was built about 1810, with a large brick wing added in 1904. It is a two-story, five-bay, stuccoed brick building. It features a huge two-story hexastyle portico with massive Tuscan order columns. Originally built as a private dwelling, it was converted to dormitory use. In 1991, it was completely restored thanks to the patronage of heiresses Margaret Hunt Hill and Caroline Rose Hunt.

It was listed on the National Register of Historic Places (NRHP) in 1979.

== See also ==
Other NRHP-listed buildings on campus are the Mary Baldwin University, Main Building, C. W. Miller House, and Rose Terrace.
