= Cedar Creek and Belle Grove National Historical Park =

National Historical Park of the United States

- U.S. National Register of Historic Places
- U.S. National Historic Landmark District
- U.S. National Historical Park
- Virginia Landmarks Register
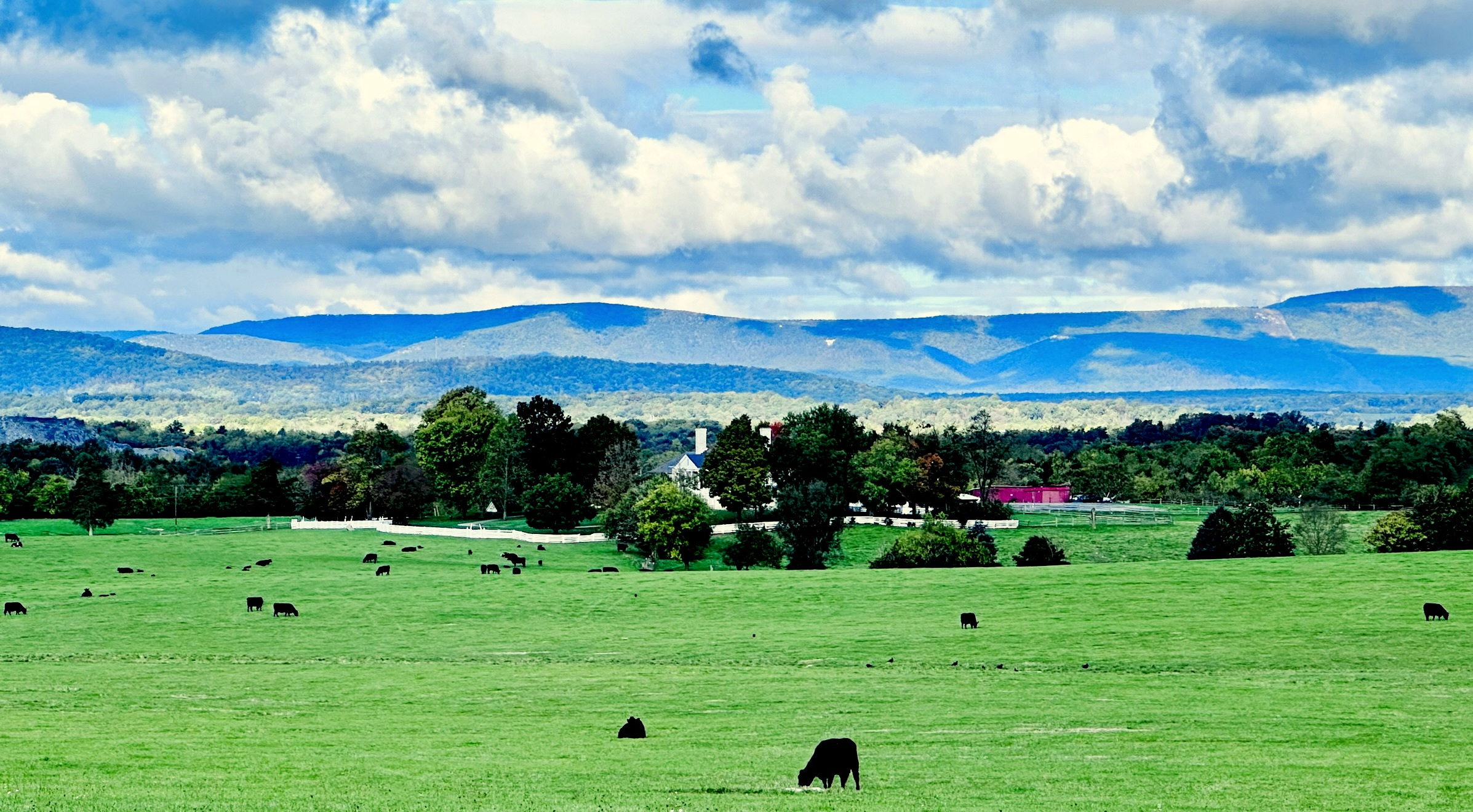
- Cedar Creek and Belle Grove National Historical Park including the Belle Grove manor house

- Location within Virginia Location within the United States
- Location: Frederick, Shenandoah, and Warren counties, Virginia, USA
- Nearest city: Middletown, Virginia
- Coordinates: 39°0′43″N 78°18′14″W
- Area: 3,712 acres (1,502 ha)
- Built: 1797
- Architect: Hite, Isaac
- Architectural style: Federal
- Website: Cedar Creek and Belle Grove National Historical Park
- NRHP reference No.: 69000243
- VLR No.: 034-0002

Significant dates
- Added to NRHP: August 11, 1969
- Designated NHLD: August 11, 1969
- Designated NHP: December 19, 2002
- Designated VLR: November 5, 1968

Cedar Creek and Belle Grove National Historical Park became the 388th unit of the United States National Park Service when it was authorized on December 19, 2002. The National Historical Park was created to protect several historically significant locations in the Shenandoah Valley of Northern Virginia, notably the site of the American Civil War Battle of Cedar Creek and the Belle Grove Plantation.

Although there are over 3,700 acres within the park's authorized boundary, over half of this is still privately owned. Much of the battlefield is not accessible to the public, but the park offers ranger-led and self-guided driving tours of the battlefield via public roads. Nearly all of the remaining land (approximately 1,500 acres) and buildings are preserved and administered by partner sites which predate the park. Since summer 2010, the park has offered interpretive ranger programs at key partner sites, including Cedar Creek Battlefield Foundation headquarters, Belle Grove Plantation, and Hupp's Hill Civil War Park. The American Battlefield Trust and its federal, state and local partners have acquired and preserved 727 acres (2.94 km^{2}) of the battlefield through November 2021, some of which has been acquired by the National Park Service and incorporated into the park.

In 2012, the park acquired land on which sits a monument to the 8th Vermont Infantry and now offers access through semi-regular programs at the site. In March 2013, the park opened a Visitor Contact Station in Middletown, Virginia, featuring interpretive exhibits and information on how visitors can experience the park.

The Cedar Creek Battlefield and Belle Grove is also a U.S. National Historic Landmark, and the 900-acre (360 ha) "Cedar Creek Battlefield and Belle Grove" is listed on the National Register of Historic Places.

The plantation house of Belle Grove (1797) is open to the public and operates independently as part of the National Trust for Historic Preservation.

The listed area is in Frederick County and Warren County.

== See also ==
- List of National Historic Landmarks in Virginia
- National Register of Historic Places listings in Frederick County, Virginia
- National Register of Historic Places listings in Warren County, Virginia
