= Claudia Brind-Woody =

American business executive

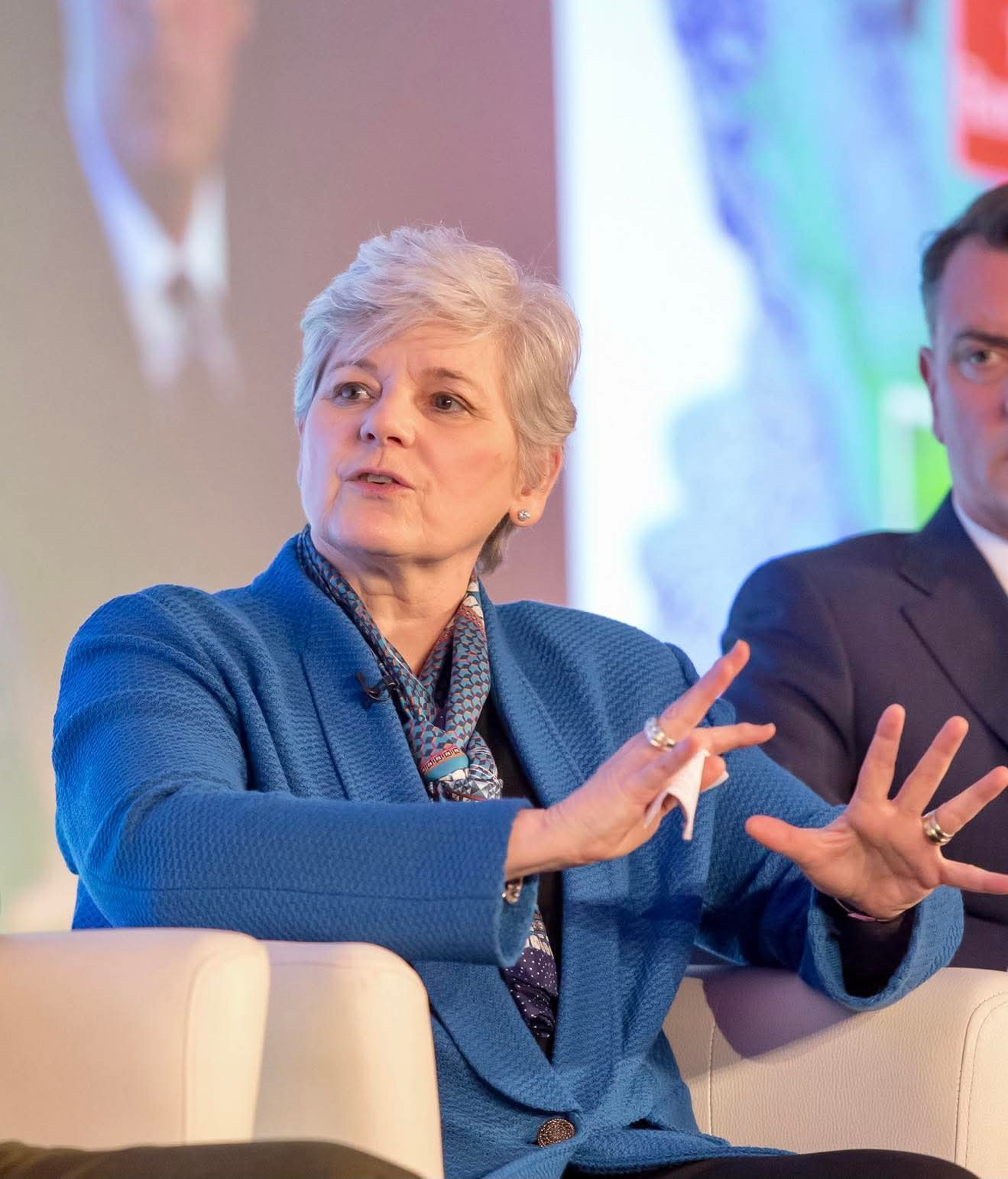
- Claudia Brind-Woody speaking at an Economist event
- Born: Virginia, U.S.
- Education: Mary Baldwin College (BA); Georgia State University (JD); University of Tennessee (MS); University of Texas at Austin (MBA)
- Occupation: Business executive

Claudia Lavergne Brind-Woody is an American business executive. She worked for IBM for over 28 years where she ran multiple global teams including being the Vice President and Managing Director of intellectual property at IBM. Currently she is an Executive Coach and Consultant.

== Early life and education ==
Around 1956 Brind-Woody was a toddler in Southern Virginia. On being asked when she first knew that she was LGBT:

I was about 12 when I knew I was different, but I didn’t have a word for it. The local library in my small factory town in Southern Virginia didn’t have much in the way of resources on the topic, but I knew I was different, and looking back, I could tell that absolutely I was lesbian.

Brind-Woody attended Mary Baldwin College, graduating (Phi Beta Kappa) summa cum laude in 1977. Brind-Woody entered the University of Tennessee-Knoxville, earning a master's degree in Higher Education Administration. During this time she was an Assistant Basketball coach under Pat Summitt of the Tennessee Lady Volunteers basketball team, who was - upon retirement - the most successful college basketball coach in history. After completing her masters, she served as Assistant Women's Athletics Director.

Those of us who were lesbians and working in college athletics were very circumspect. We wanted opportunities for all women in athletics, and we made the assessment that being out wasn't worth jeopardizing opportunities for other women.

Brind-Woody was also the Assistant Women's Athletics Director at the University of Texas at Austin. She earned an MBA from the University of Texas where she was awarded the Kozmetsky prize. Brind-Woody gained a JD degree from Georgia State University where she graduated magna cum laude.

== Professional life ==
Early in her career, Brind-Woody spent three years as the Assistant Dean of the College & Graduate School of Business at the University of Texas at Austin. It was in this role where Brind-Woody first came out at work. She also worked for the Atlanta Committee for the Olympic Games.

=== IBM ===
Brind-Woody joined IBM in 1996. She led the IBM Global Intellectual Property Licensing division. Brind-Woody led a source code licensing team, IBM's Divestiture Practice, the IP Partnership program, and IP Management Solutions.

== LGBT & diversity ==
Brind-Woody is the Global Co-Chair for the LGBT Executive Taskforce at IBM. This taskforce has sponsored initiatives to make IBM a more welcoming place to LGBT employees. For example, IBM rolled out Straight Ally Training and Certification to 440,000 IBM employees worldwide. IBM was one of the founding members of the Stonewall Global Diversity Champions Programme and sponsors the Stonewall Leadership program.

Brind-Woody has been the keynote speaker at numerous global forums: European Commission on LGBT Rights in Brussels (2008), International conference on LGBT Human Rights in Copenhagen (2009), Europride Business Forums in Zurich and Warsaw (2009, 2010), Company Pride Platform (2010), L-Women at Work conference in Amsterdam (2011), Out & Equal Executive Forum in San Francisco (2012), Prague Pride Business Forum, and the Slovakia Business Forum. She has been a keynote speaker for Out & Equal Workplace Advocates, WorkPlace Pride, and the Danish Trade Council. She was a panellist for The Economist Pride and Prejudice event in London.

Brind-Woody has also served on the board of directors or advisory board of

- Out & Equal Workplace Advocates (US)
- Lambda Legal (US)
- Workplace Pride (Netherlands)
- OUTstanding (UK)
- Wybernet (Switzerland)
- Stonewall Global Diversity Champions Programme (UK)
- Gay Star News Advisory Board
- The Economist Pride & Prejudice Advisory Board

== Awards and honors ==
In 2011 she won the Out & Equal Trailblazer award and was named as one of GO's 100 women we love. In 2012 Brind-Woody was named in The Guardian's 100 most influential LGBT people of the year. In 2013, 2014, and 2015 she was named in the Financial Times's Top 50 OUTstanding list, then in 2016 she entered in their hall of fame. In 2015, Daily Telegraph included Brind-Woody on its list of Top 50 LGBT Executives. In 2019 she was named one of the most powerful LGBTQ+ people in tech by Business Insider.

Website: https://www.claudiabrindwoody.com
