= Mary Baldwin University, Main Building =

Historic academic building in Virginia, US

- Mary Baldwin College, Main Building
- U.S. National Register of Historic Places
- Virginia Landmarks Register
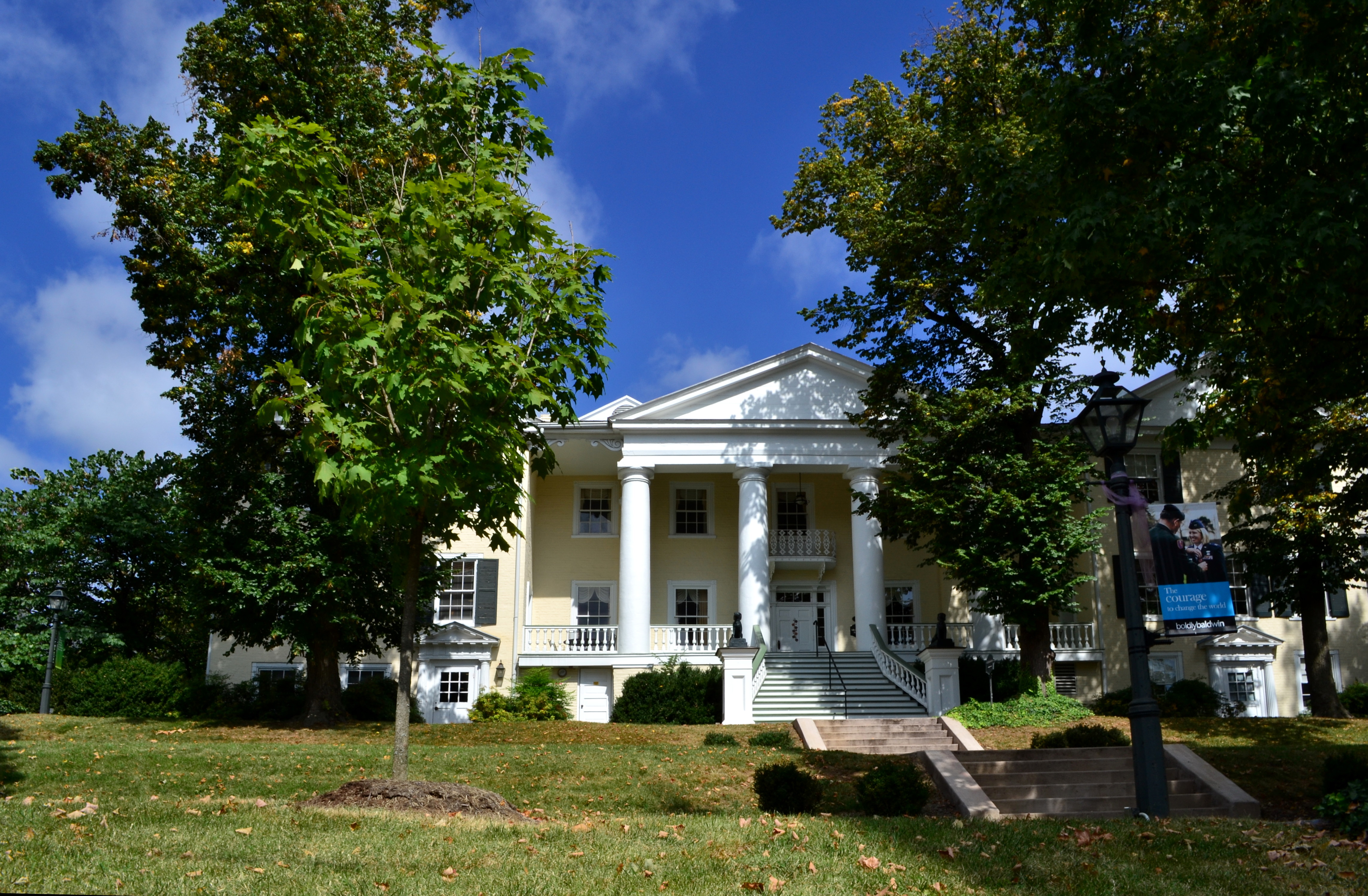

- Location within Virginia Location within the United States
- Location: Mary Baldwin University campus, Staunton, Virginia
- Coordinates: 38°9′4″N 79°4′18″W
- Area: 1 acre (0.40 ha)
- Built: 1844
- Architectural style: Greek Revival
- NRHP reference No.: 73002227
- VLR No.: 132-0016

Significant dates
- Added to NRHP: July 26, 1973
- Designated VLR: June 17, 1973

The Mary Baldwin University, Main Building is a historic building on the Mary Baldwin University campus in Staunton, Virginia. It was built in 1844, and is a Greek Revival style educational building. It consists of a two-story, five bay central section, flanked by three-bay two-story wings with full basement and projecting gable ends. The front facade features a four-bay portico with four Greek Doric order columns supporting a Doric entablature and pediment.

It was listed on the National Register of Historic Places (NRHP) in 1973.

== See also ==
Hilltop, C. W. Miller House, and Rose Terrace are other NRHP-listed buildings on the campus.
