= Rufus William Bailey =

American educator (1793–1863)

Portrait photograph of Rufus Bailey

Rufus William Bailey (April 13, 1793 – April 25, 1863) was the founder of Augusta Female Seminary (later Mary Baldwin College), in Staunton, Virginia, and also president of Austin College, in Huntsville, Texas. Born in North Yarmouth, Maine, to clockmaker Lebbeus Bailey and Sarah Myrick, Bailey graduated from Dartmouth College in 1813. He was ordained as a Congregational minister but later joined the Presbyterian Church. In 1842 he founded Augusta Female Seminary. After serving as principal for seven years, he resigned to become the Virginia agent for the American Colonization Society. Bailey was a prolific writer whose works include English Grammar (1853) and The Scholar's Companion (1856).

Bailey became a professor of languages at Austin College in Huntsville, Texas, in 1858. He served as president of the college from 1858 until his death.
