= Stuart Addition Historic District =

Historic district in Virginia, United States

- U.S. National Register of Historic Places
- U.S. Historic district
- Virginia Landmarks Register
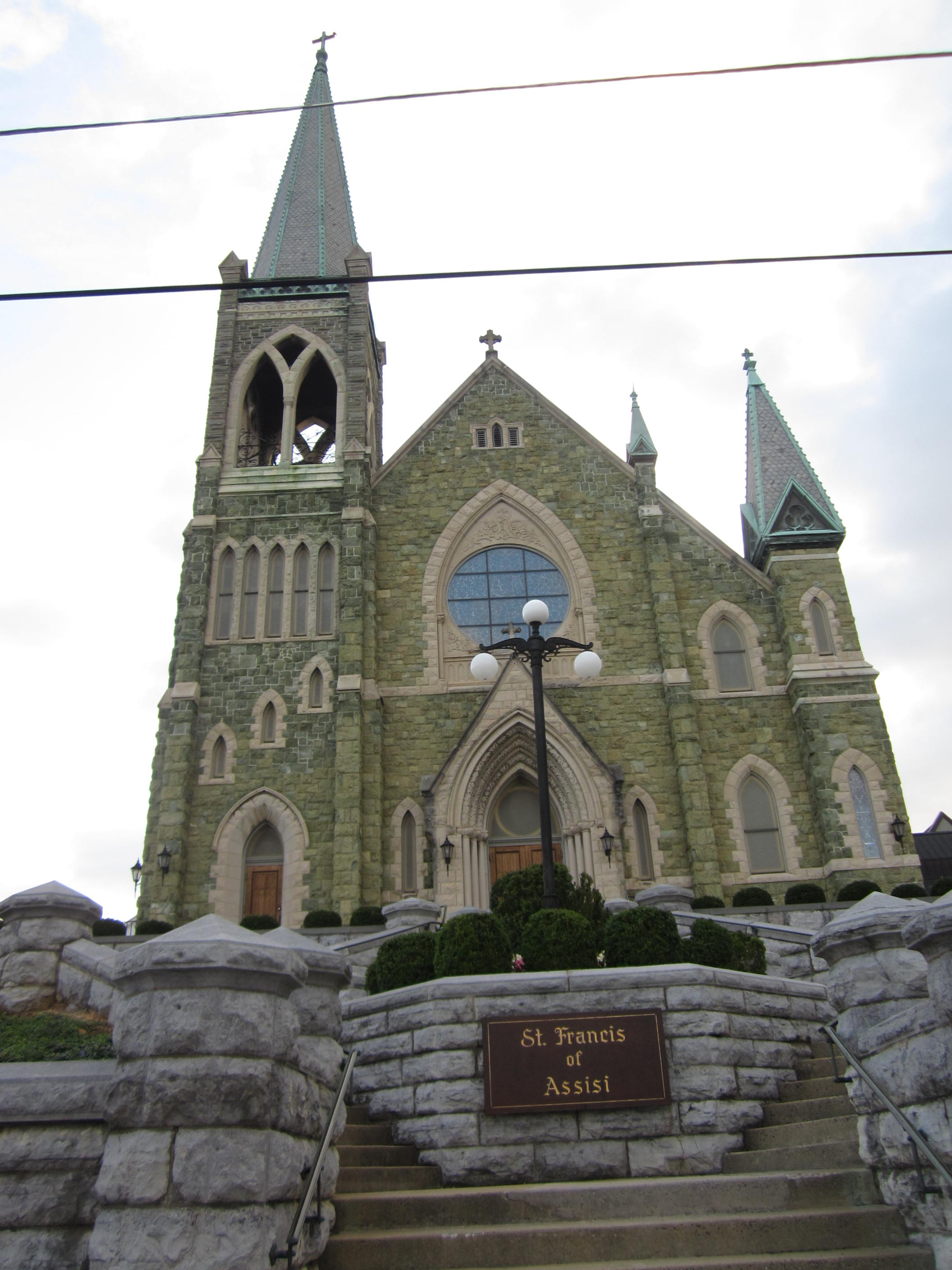
- Saint Francis of Assisi Catholic Church

- Location within Virginia Location within the United States
- Location: Roughly bounded by Augusta, Sunnyside, Market, and New Sts., Staunton, Virginia
- Coordinates: 38°9′12″N 79°4′11″W
- Area: 23.3 acres (9.4 ha)
- Built: c. 1870
- Architect: Multiple
- Architectural style: Colonial Revival, Italianate, Gothic Revival
- NRHP reference No.: 84003604
- VLR No.: 132-0036

Significant dates
- Added to NRHP: May 3, 1984
- Designated VLR: March 20, 1984

Stuart Addition Historic District is a national historic district located at Staunton, Virginia. The district encompasses 93 contributing buildings in a primarily residential section of Staunton. The district includes some early 19th-century structures, but most of the homes were built after 1870. The medium-density residential area includes notable examples of the Colonial Revival, Italianate, and Gothic Revival styles. Notable buildings include the Blakely or Templeton House (c. 1865, 1917), Steele House (1928), Kivlighan House (1910), Arlington Flats (c. 1890, c. 1905), D. Webster Davis School (1915), St. Francis of Assisi Catholic Church (1895), Augusta Street Methodist Church (1876, 1911), Ebenezer Baptist Church (1910), and Mt. Zion Baptist Church (1904). Located in the district is the separately listed C. W. Miller House.

It was added to the National Register of Historic Places in 1984.
