= Belle Grove Plantation (Middletown, Virginia) =

Historic house in Virginia, United States

- U.S. National Historic Landmark District – Contributing property
- Virginia Landmarks Register
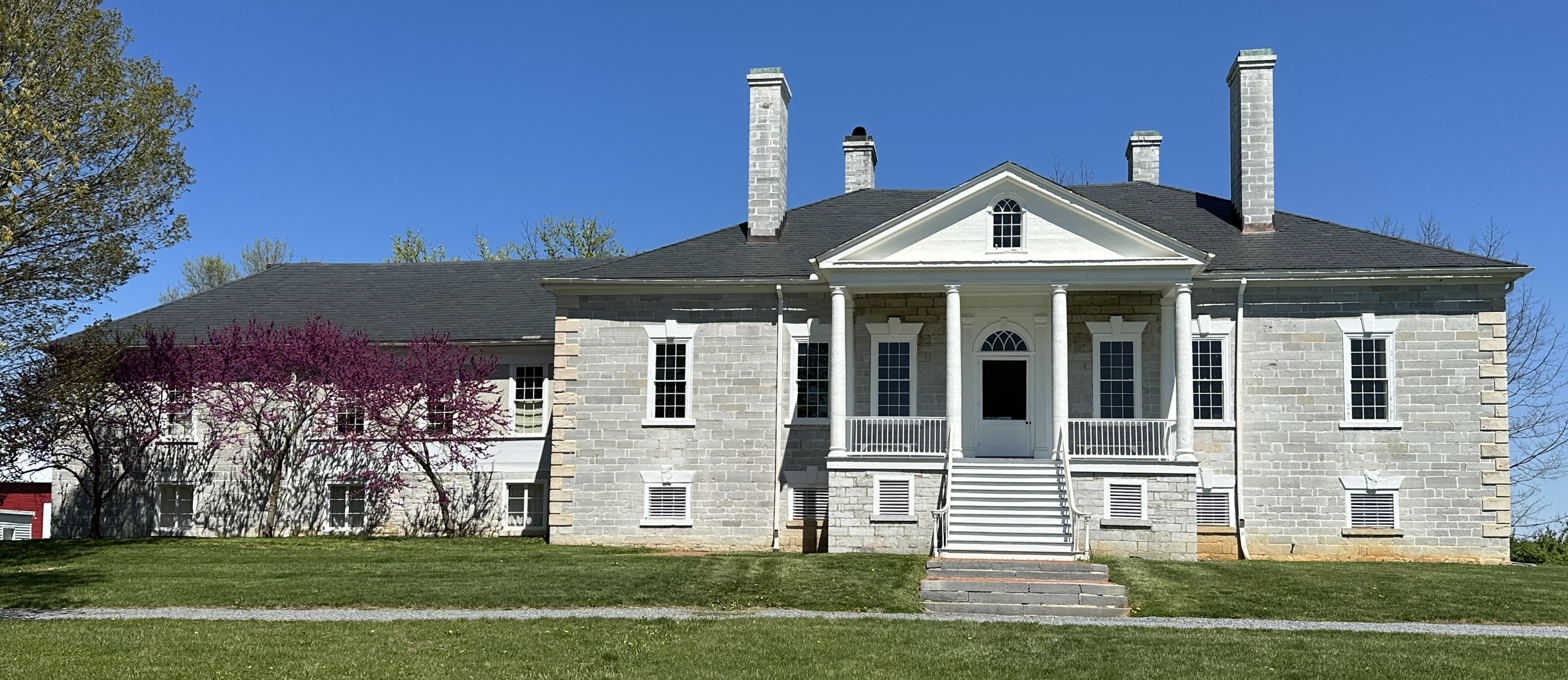
- The manor house at Belle Grove Plantation

- Location within Virginia
- Interactive map showing the location of Belle Grove Plantation
- Location: On I-81 between Middletown and Strasburg, near Middletown, Virginia
- Coordinates: 39°01′10″N 78°18′15″W
- Area: 283 acres (1.15 km^{2})
- Built: 1794–97
- Architectural style: Federal
- Part of: Cedar Creek Battlefield and Belle Grove (ID69000243)
- VLR No.: 034-0002

Significant dates
- Designated NHLDCP: August 11, 1969
- Designated VLR: November 5, 1968

Belle Grove Plantation is a late-18th-century plantation house and estate in the northern Shenandoah Valley of Virginia, USA. It is situated in Frederick County, about a mile southwest of Middletown.

Built between 1794 and 1797, the large Federal-style manor house is a National Historic Landmark and was opened to the public by its owners, the National Trust for Historic Preservation (NTHP), as a historic house museum in 1967. In 2002, Belle Grove became part of the Cedar Creek and Belle Grove National Historical Park, a National Park Service unit, although it continues to be owned and operated by the NTHP.

It is part of a U.S. National Historic Landmark, the Cedar Creek Battlefield and Belle Grove Plantation. Belle Grove is also designated a Virginia Historic Landmark and, as part of 900-acre (3.6 km^{2}) "Cedar Creek Battlefield and Belle Grove", is listed on the National Register of Historic Places.

Historically important as the home of revolutionary veteran Major Isaac Hite, Jr – President James Madison’s brother-in-law – and as the headquarters of General Philip Sheridan during the Battle of Cedar Creek (1864), the manor house has been little altered over the centuries and remains one of the best preserved 18th century homes in the country. With views of the surrounding Shenandoah Valley, Blue Ridge and Alleghenies, the estate is situated on 283 acres of Maj. Hite’s original 483 acres. (The entire CCBGNHP, including the nearby battlefield, consists of 3,593 acres.)

== Grounds ==
Belle Grove's plantation grounds include the large limestone manor house (which accommodates the visitor center in its basement), an 1815 icehouse and smokehouse, a slave cemetery, a "heritage orchard", and a demonstration garden designed by the Garden Club of Virginia.

At the entrance to the plantation is a monument erected in 1919 in memory of Stephen Dodson Ramseur, a Confederate general who died at the plantation in 1864 following the Battle of Belle Grove.

=== Manor house ===
Exterior: The symmetrical main block (which excludes the single west wing, added in 1815) consists of three stories: a basement, a piano nobile main floor, and an attic half-story. The corners are decorated with quoins. The front (south) elevation, which is the only one in which the limestone is finished, consists of seven bays: six with main floor windows (the extreme right and left are double width) and the center one with the main entry. Twelve steps ascend the elevated front portico, with its prominent pediment and four Tuscan-style columns, which encompasses the three central bays – of which the middle one has the main door and door surround, framed by two pilasters also of the Tuscan order. This main block originally had neo-classical-style porticos on all four sides, but today only the front and back (south and north) porticos survive.

Interior:
The interior is notable for its fine woodwork in a transitional style ranging from Georgian to Federal.

== History ==
Jost Hite – grandfather of Major Isaac Hite, Jr – was a German immigrant to the Shenandoah Valley. In 1732, Jost and his partner Robert McKay, along with 16 other families, journeyed via the Valley Pike into the northern Valley to settle on 140,000 acres (570 km^{2}) acquired through two land grants. One of Jost's sons – Isaac Hite, Sr – purchased 300 acres (1.2 km^{2}) in 1748, and another 183 acres (0.74 km^{2}) in 1770, just southwest of Middletown. Together, these would become the Belle Grove Plantation.

The first house on the Belle Grove site (a large limestone structure later called the “Old Hall”) was built for a tenant farmer around 1750. (Its foundations are still visible adjacent to the smokehouse.) Isaac, Jr, attended College of William & Mary and served in the Continental Army during the American Revolutionary War. Upon their marriage in 1783, Isaac, Sr, gave his son and daughter-in-law – Nelly Conway Madison, sister of the future President – the 483-acre (1.95 km^{2}) Belle Grove house and grounds. In 1794, construction began on the new mansion, which was completed in three years. It was constructed of local limestone quarried on the property, and, according to prevailing custom, was intended to display the owners' high social and financial status. Thomas Jefferson, through the agency of his friend James Madison, made a number of suggestions to the architect which strongly influenced the final design. Madison is known to have visited the plantation several times, even staying in the "Old Hall" (before the larger house was built) during his own honeymoon in 1794.

After Nelly's death (1802), Major Hite married Ann Tunstall Maury. Of the three children born to the first marriage and the ten to the second, all but one lived into adulthood. In 1815, an addition was made at the west end of the house realizing the 100-foot (30 m) facade that exists today. As his grain and livestock holdings grew, Maj. Hite expanded his estate to include a total of 7,500 acres (30 km^{2}) of land and 103 slave workers. He eventually owned and operated a general store, grist-mill, saw-mill and distillery. After his death (1836), and that of Ann (1851), Belle Grove Plantation was sold out of the family.

By the start of the Civil War, the estate no longer existed as it had during the Hite family era. There was a succession of owners before the Brumback family purchased the property in 1907. The Brumbacks operated an inn there in the 1920s, but sold it to Francis Welles Hunnewell of Wellesley, Massachusetts in 1929. These 20th-century owners altered the house very little. With professional assistance, Mr. Hunnewell had the house carefully restored in the 1930s and 1940s. Upon his death in 1964, he bequeathed the house, 100 surrounding acres, and an endowment of $100,000 (~$770,762 in 2024) to the National Trust for Historic Preservation. Belle Grove was opened as a house museum in 1967 and has been open to the public, as well as remaining a working farm, ever since.

== Gallery ==
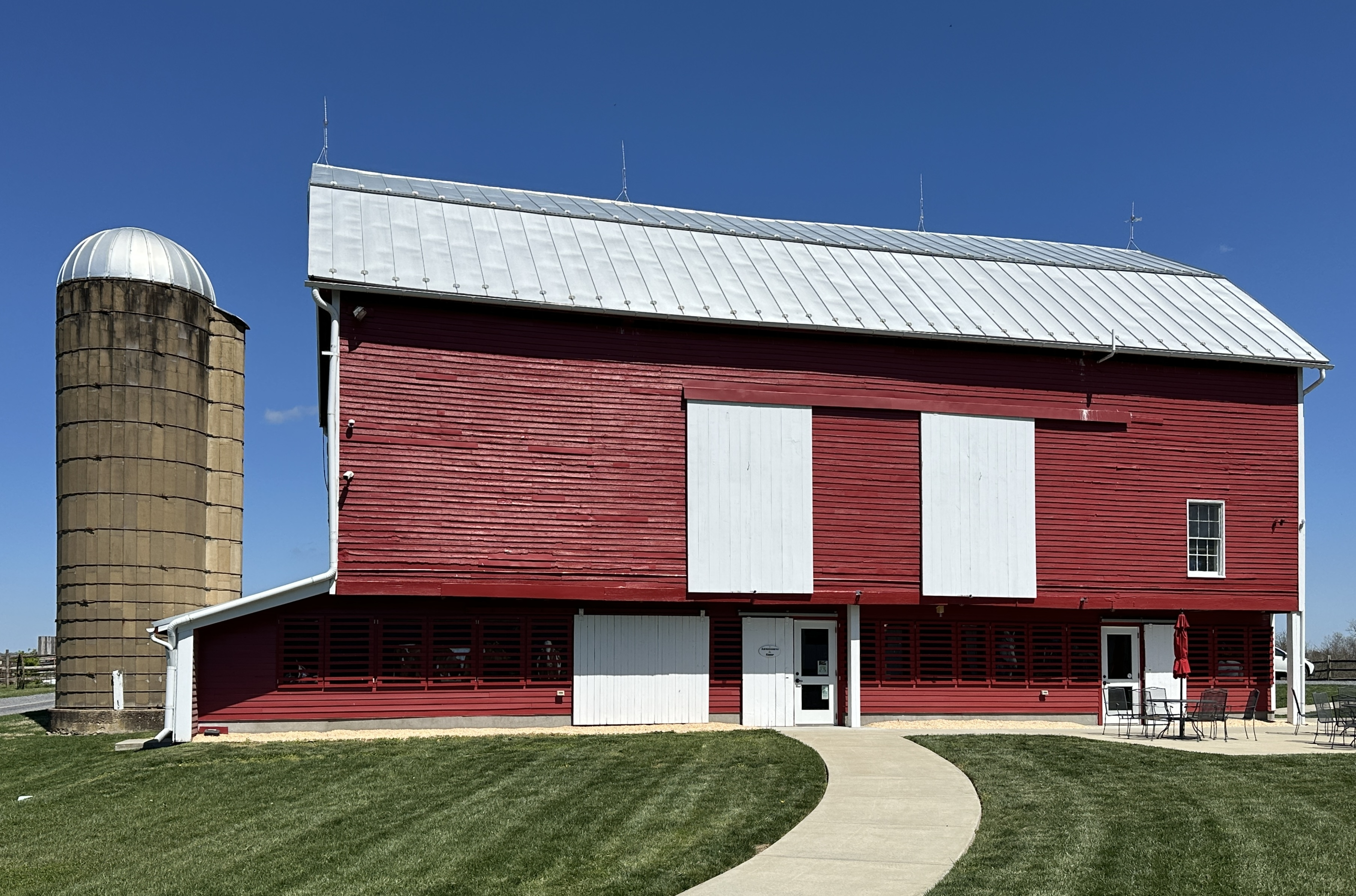
Plantation barn built in 1918

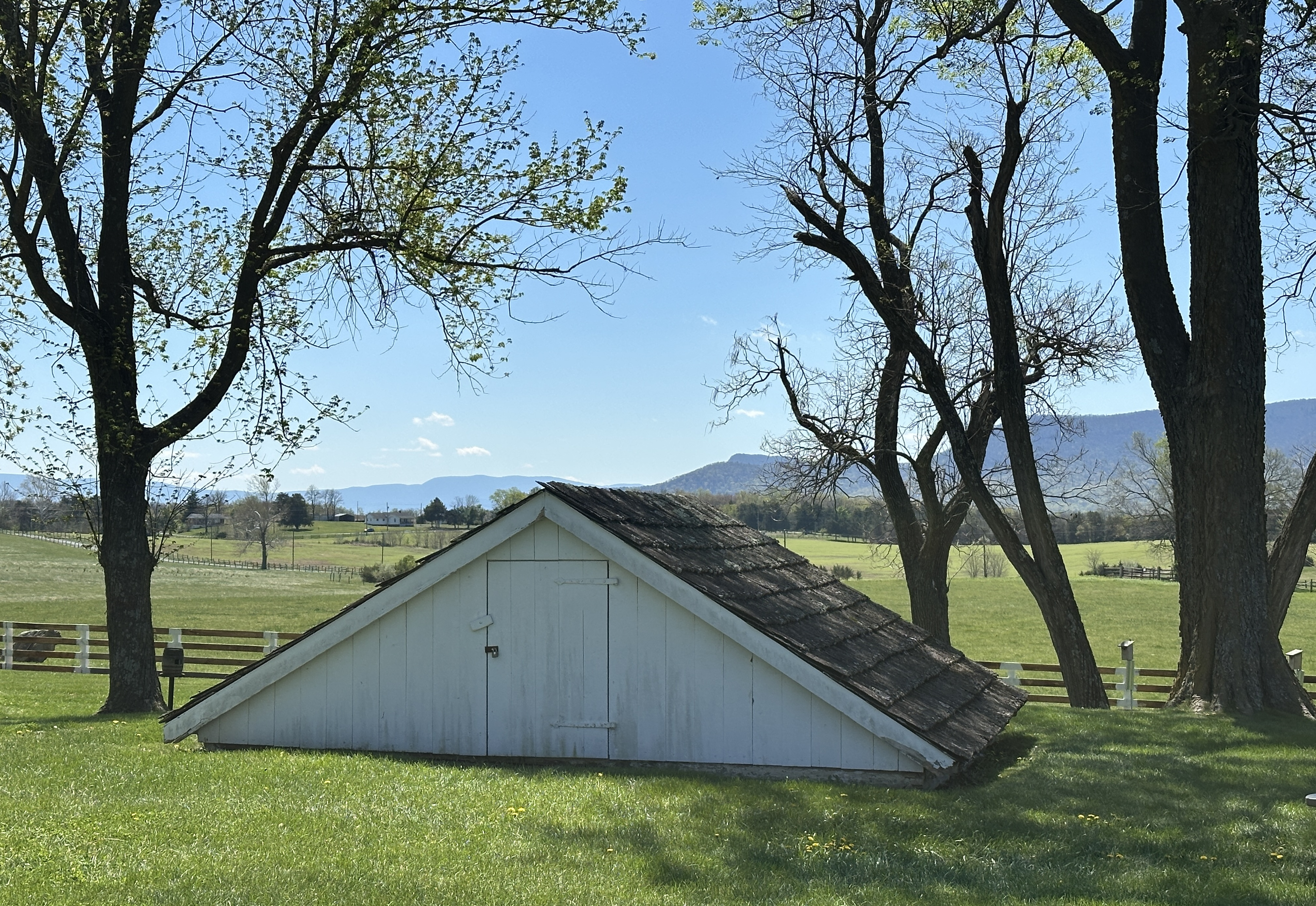
Ice house built in 1815

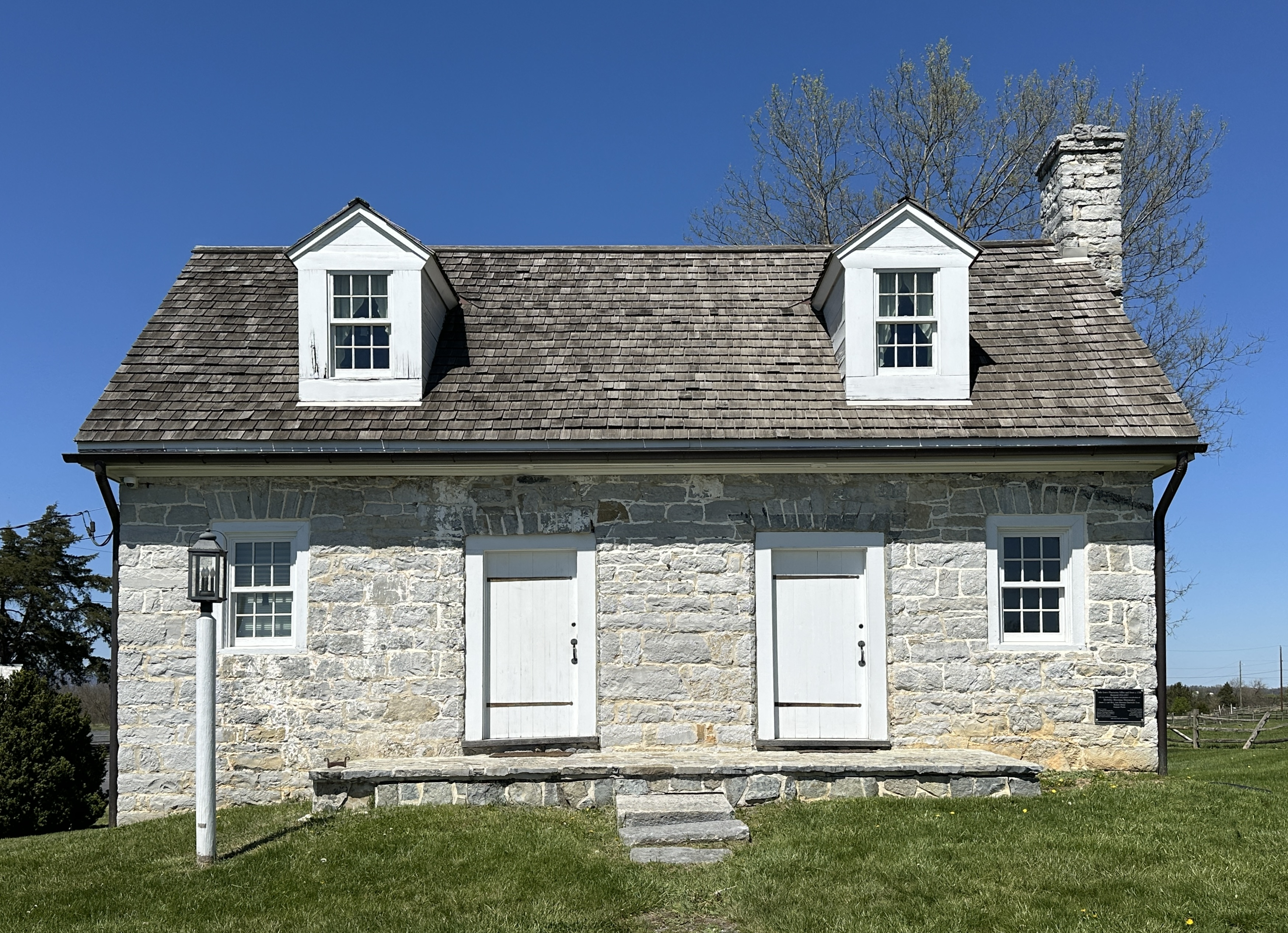
Plantation office built in 1788

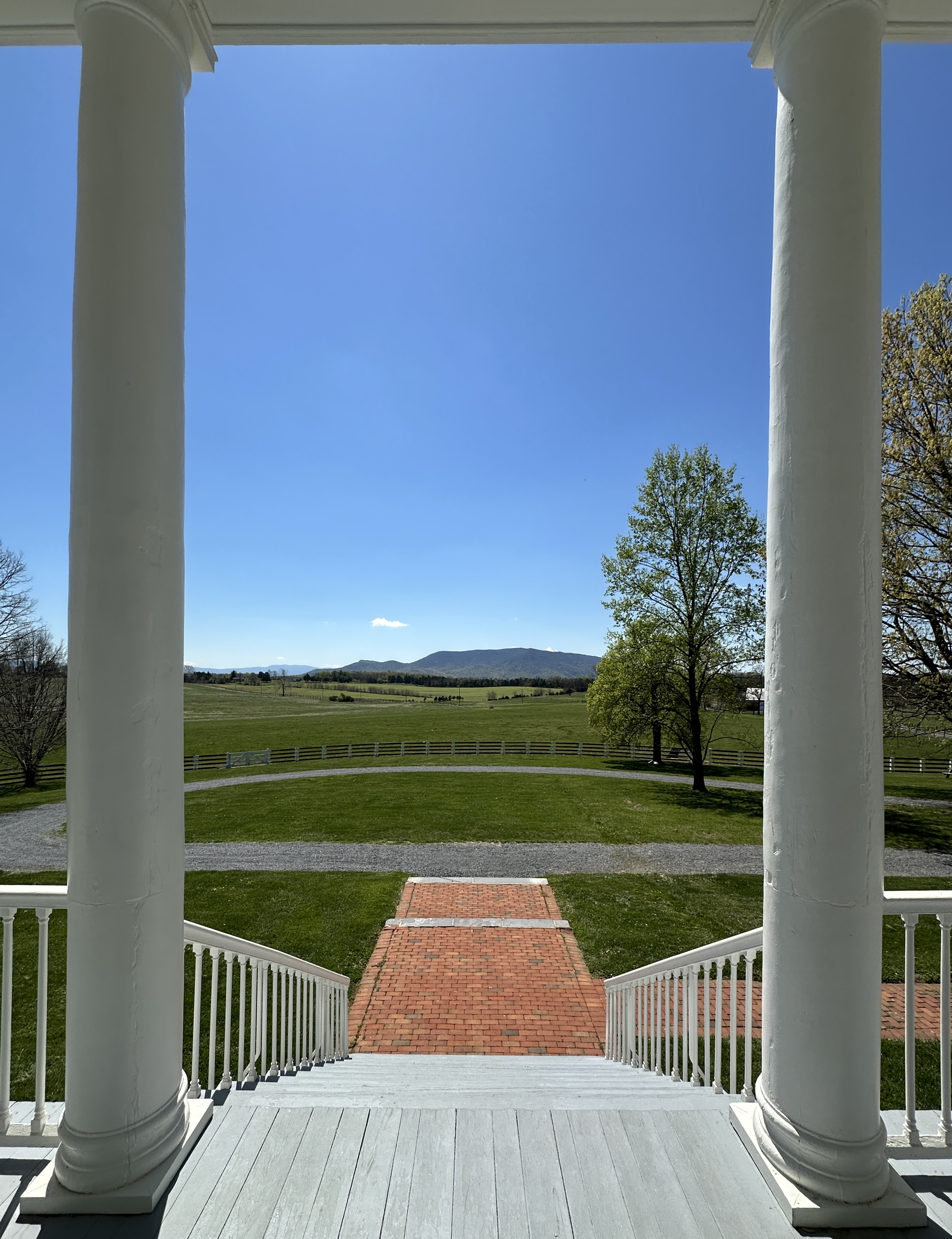
View from the manor house porch

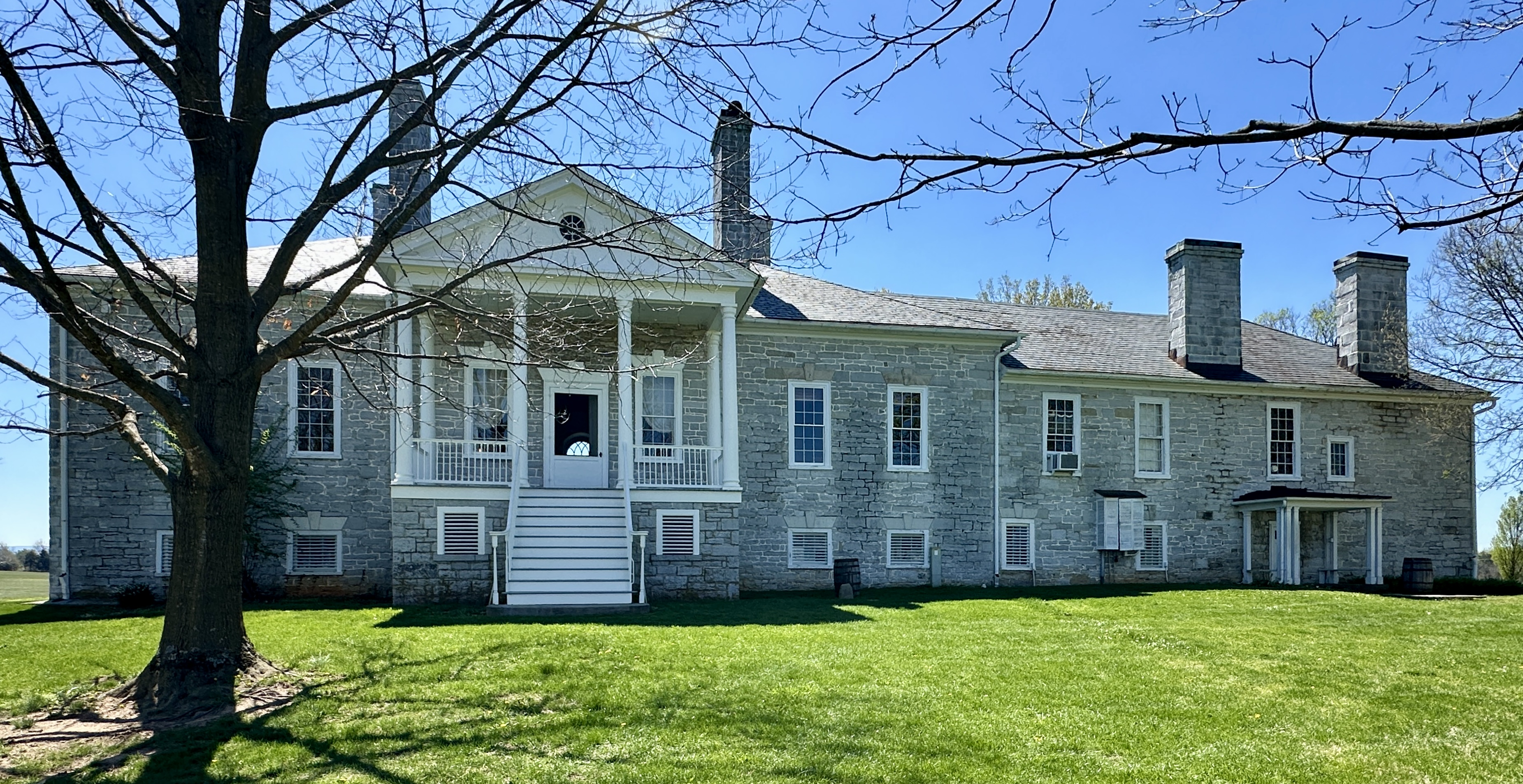
Rear view of the manor house

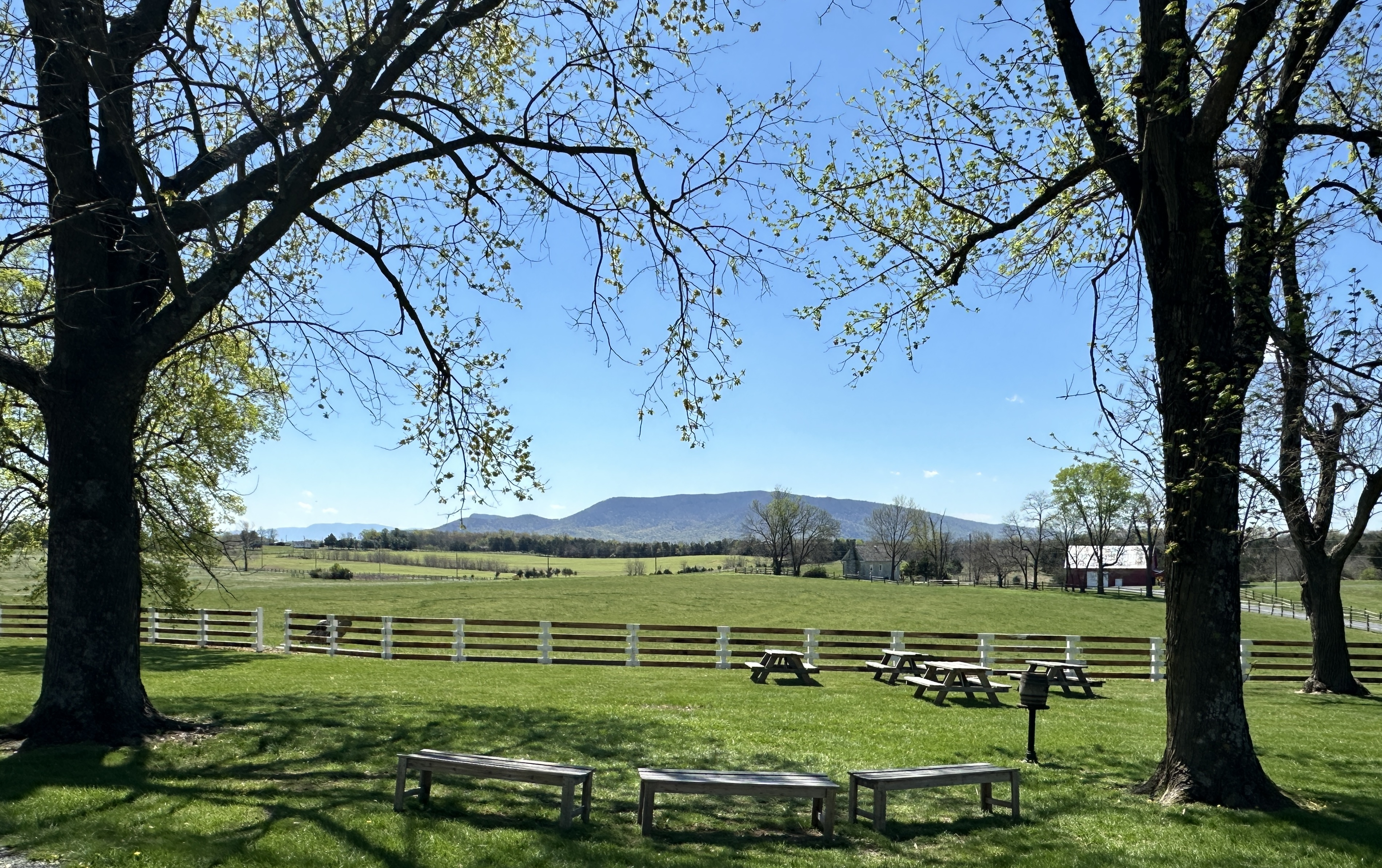
Benches near the manor house

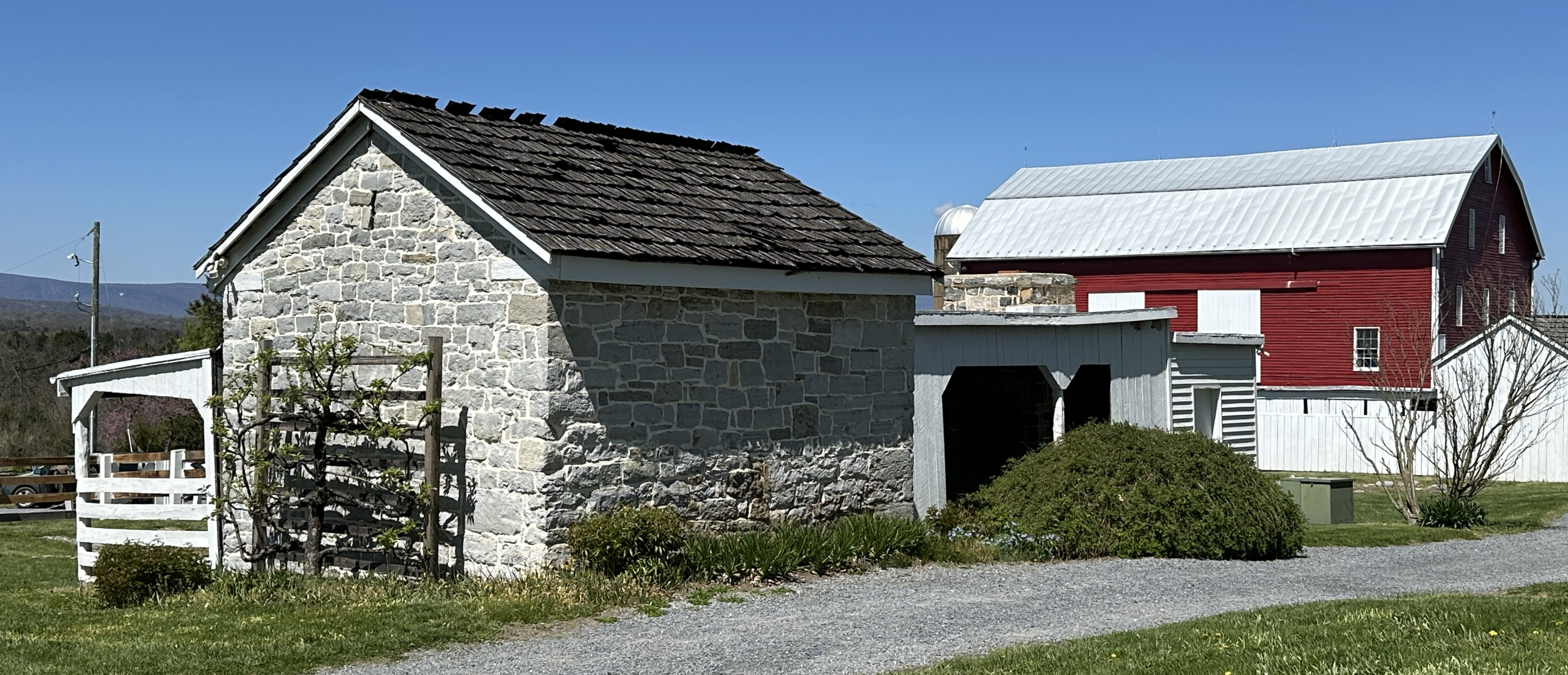
Barn and 19th-century outbuilding

== See also ==
- Jeffersonian architecture
- Mary Briscoe Baldwin
