= Mary Julia Baldwin =

American educator (1829–1897)

- Born: October 4, 1829; Winchester, Virginia, U.S.
- Died: July 1, 1897 (aged 67); Staunton, Virginia, U.S.
- Occupation: Educator

Mary Julia Baldwin (4 October 1829 – 1 July 1897) was an American educator in Staunton, Virginia. For thirty-four years she ran Augusta Female Seminary, later named Mary Baldwin College, which was named in her honor in 1895 and later became Mary Baldwin University.

== Early and family life ==
Born to Margaret Sarah Sowers Baldwin Heiskell and her husband William Daniel Baldwin in Winchester, Virginia at the northern end of the Shenandoah Valley on October 4, 1829, Mary Julia Baldwin never knew her father, who died when she was a baby. Raised by her maternal grandparents in Staunton, Virginia after her mother remarried, in 1842 Mary became a member of the first class of sixty girls at the Augusta Female Seminary. Local Presbyterian ministers had organized it, and the Virginia General Assembly incorporated it on January 30, 1845. After four years of studies, Mary Baldwin graduated at the top of her class.

Baldwin suffered a high fever as a child that permanently twisted and paralyzed the left side of her face. She never married, nor permitted a photograph or portrait to be made of her. An animal lover, she had numerous pets including two dogs (Midget and Beauty), who followed her around campus.

== Career ==
After graduation, Baldwin taught Sunday school for young women and another class for African-American children. She also taught her grandmother's slaves to read and write. During the American Civil War, the Augusta Female Seminary faced closure when its principal and his two daughters (both teachers) relocated to Texas. The remaining trustees persuaded Baldwin (then operating a local school a year after her grandmother's death) to assume its leadership as principal in August 1863, with her long-time friend Agnes McClung as matron. Baldwin borrowed furniture, books, and supplies for her pupils, and asked them to pay tuition (and for some room and board) with food and fuel. They also used various ruses to preserve their supplies from various military raiding parties. Thus, unlike the other three schools in town (and most other Southern schools), the female academy remained open during the conflict.

After the war, aided by William Holmes McGuffey, professor of moral philosophy at the University of Virginia, and brother of teacher Eliza Howard, Baldwin improved the school's curriculum. It came to include rhetoric, composition, higher mathematics, chemistry and physics, as well as topics traditionally taught to well-bred women such as music, visual arts, and elocution. Baldwin wanted it to become a college or even university (as would happen after her death). The curriculum also offered practical courses in bookkeeping, nutrition, and calisthenics.

== Death and legacy ==
She died at her campus home in 1897. The Virginia General Assembly renamed the school in her honor in 1895, nearly two decades after former students had donated sculptures of her beloved dogs, which were sometimes renamed and became the subject of several campus traditions. During her lifetime, Baldwin accumulated and improved about ten acres of land, which she left to the college. Her estate of about $250,000 was divided among the college, her church and her relatives. The college also preserved her home and is currently renovating some of the furnishings she left. By 1922, the school was fully accredited and renamed "Mary Baldwin College".

The Library of Virginia honored Baldwin as a member of the inaugural class of Virginia Women in History in 2000.
