= Mary Briscoe Baldwin =

American missionary educator

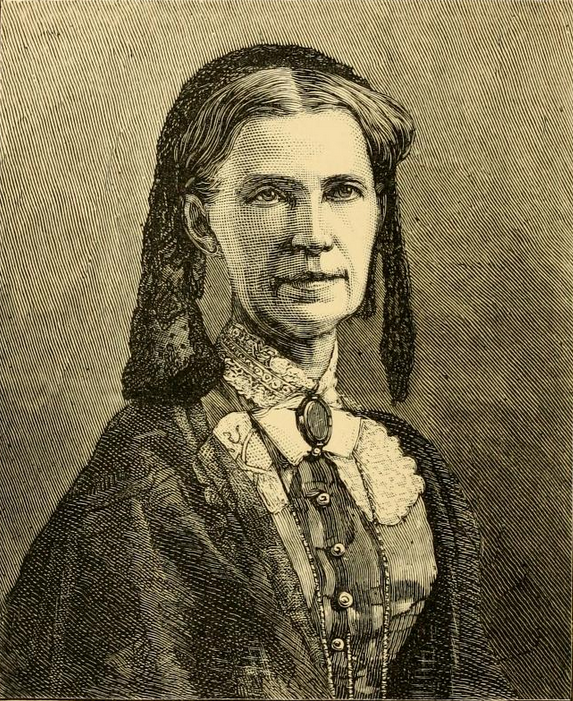
- Mary Briscoe Baldwin
- Born: May 20, 1811; Belle Grove, Frederick County, Virginia, U.S.
- Died: June 20, 1877 (aged 66); Ottoman Palestine
- Burial place: Jaffa

Mary Briscoe Baldwin (May 20, 1811 – June 20, 1877) was a 19th-century American missionary educator to Greece and Joppa. She was the "first unmarried woman sent out by the Foreign Committee of the Protestant Episcopal church's Mission Board". During the Crimean War, Baldwin assisted Florence Nightingale in hospitals, and they became friends.

== Early life and education ==
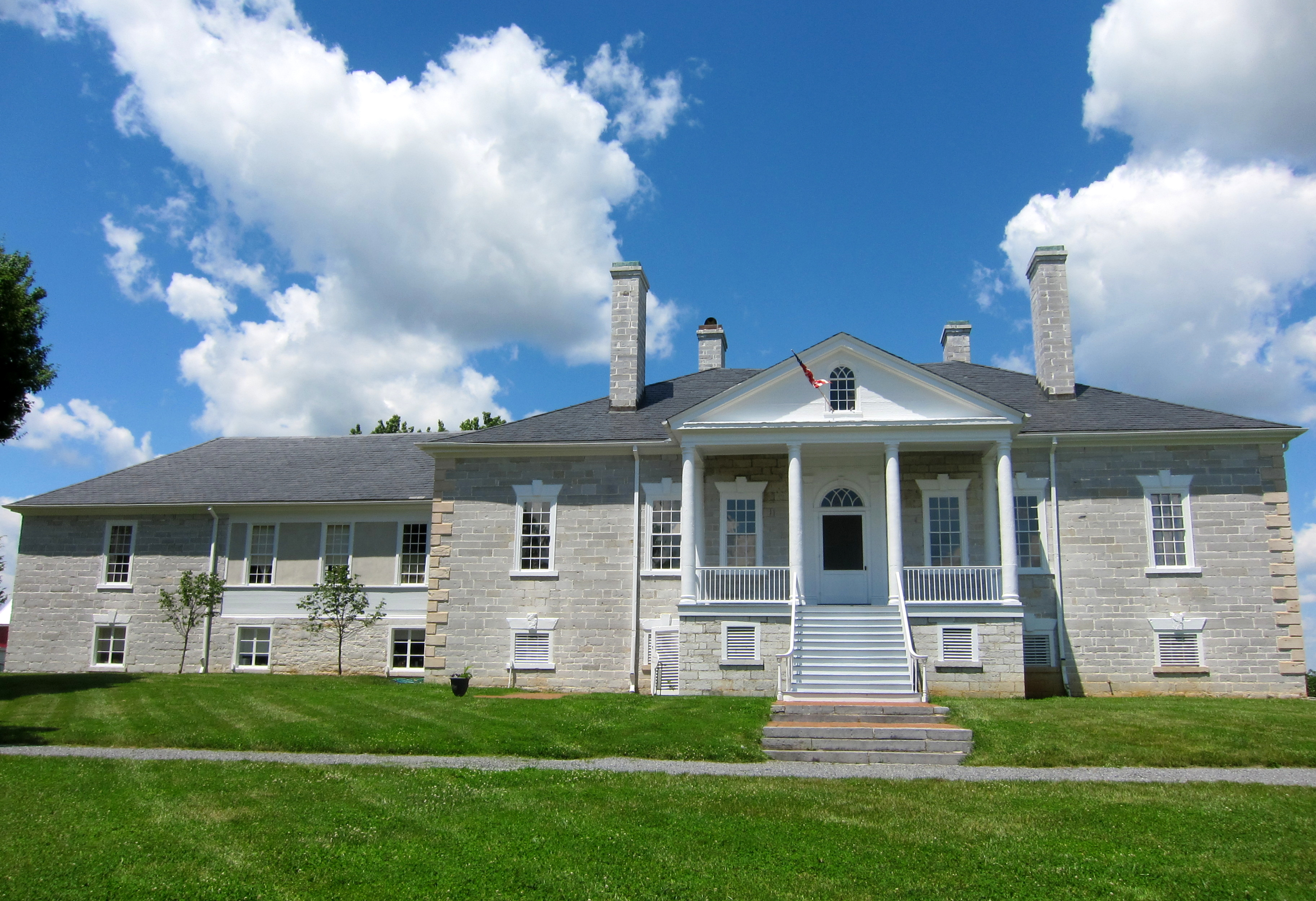
Belle Grove

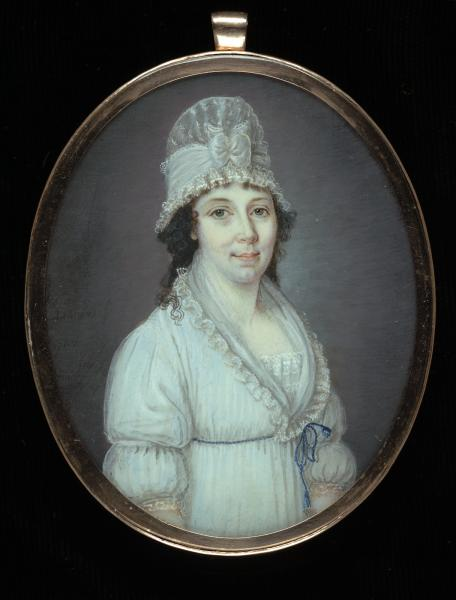
Painting of Mrs. Cornelius Baldwin (Mary Briscoe), grandmother of Mary Briscoe Baldwin.

Mary Briscoe Baldwin was born on May 20, 1811 at Belle Grove, Frederick County, Virginia, in a mansion in the Shenandoah Valley. It was the home of her grandfather. Her father was Dr. Cornelius Baldwin (d. 1828), of Winchester, Virginia. Her mother was Nelly Conway Hite (d. 1830), (daughter of Maj. Isaac Hite, of Belle Grove). Nelly was a niece of James Madison, fourth President of the United States. Mary was the second daughter in a family of twelve —including Eleanor Conway Baldwin, Isaac Hite Baldwin, Ann Maury Baldwin, James Madison Baldwin, and Robert Stuart Baldwin. The family home was at Cedar Grove, which was near Belle Grove.

All of the children in the family received their education from private tutors. On almost every subject which she studied, she formed her own opinions.

Bishop William Meade, of the Protestant Episcopal Church, was a relative who greatly influenced and helped her in her religious life. Her Christian character was put to a great test by the death of her parents, the breaking up of the family home, and the separation of the children.

== Career ==
When about twenty years of age, Mary and her sister Eleanor went to visit relatives in Staunton, Virginia. Spending about a year there, she said:—"I grew weary of fashionable life. For some years, I had felt a great desire to be directly engaged in some Christian work, especially in extending the knowledge of the Gospel among my fellow-creatures, such as is the privilege of clergymen to do, but, being a woman, I could not possibly enter the ministry. Next to this, my thoughts turned to the life of a missionary, and this seemed a position far too high and heavenly for me to attain and enjoy." Recognizing that her education was incomplete, she enrolled in Miss Sheffy's boarding school at Staunton. After two terms, she was offered the position of assistant teacher at the institution, which she accepted, but also continued her regular studies at the school.

While there, she inquired if there were an opportunity for a single woman to do foreign missionary work. The Protestant Episcopal Society received a letter from Mrs. Hill, of Athens, Greece, stating her pressing need of assistance, and urgently requesting that someone be sent to aid her in the schools she had established. As Baldwin had some acquaintance with Mrs. Hill, she was interested especially in that work, and after a long consideration of the matter she wrote,—"I rose up with a firm and steady purpose of heart and said, 'I will go.'" Baldwin was one of the first unmarried missionaries to go out from America. Her decision was a surprise to her friends, some of whom said she was "going on a wild-goose chase;" or, the old story, that she was "throwing herself away;" or, for her it was "a descent in the social scale." But none of these things moved her. After her decision was made, she at once commenced her preparations — visited her old home, and traveled over the country visiting many points of interest. She entered the service not for worldly gain; her salary was only US$250, but she was willing to supplement the deficiency by drawing upon her own financial resources.

=== Greece ===
"The changes which ... death has wrought in my family, together with some other reasons, have led me to determine to make Athens my permanent home, so long as the mission can be sustained & I am very much my own mistress." (Mary Briscoe Baldwin)

Arriving in Greece, in mid-summer 1835, she realized with great delight that her life was to be passed in a land full of stirring memories. The worship of the poorer and unlearned classes consisted mostly in the adoration of pictures, images, and sacred symbols, or in chanting prayers in the olden tongue. Many years of cruel oppression and taxation had impoverished them, so that the missionary had to minister to their bodily wants as well as to their soul needs, and Miss Baldwin, comprehending the situation, fulfilled her highest conception of duty in ministering to their every need.

Dr. and Mrs. Hill, American missionaries who had established a school and found the project developing on their hands, sought the assistance of Baldwin, who took charge of the sewing department. She soon was appreciated by the girls and the esteem of the parents, who valued the art which enabled their girls to maintain themselves.

After the acknowledgment of Greek independence, the court was removed to Athens. Milliners and dressmakers followed in the train, and wanted girls who could use their needles; and the only ones who knew anything of the art of sewing were found to be those whom Baldwin had taught. The great benefit thus conferred on impoverished families was such that Baldwin became known among the native population as "Good Lady Mary," and when she appeared on the streets, the people were ready to do her homage. This prepared the way for Christian teaching. Her object was to civilize and Christianize the daughters, and through them, the homes of the people; and with 350 children under her care, she had ample opportunity to exert an influence. Not only did she train Greek girls to be good daughters, wives, and mothers, but she educated many of the better class for teachers, who in their turn labored among the Greek and Turkish women, and thus perpetuated her influence.

After laboring for eleven years, it became necessary for her to seek relaxation, and, in company with friends, she took a trip through Italy. Not receiving the desired benefit, she made an excursion through Greece, then came to her home in the United States; but after a visit of a year, returned to Greece, taking her sister. They established a boarding school in connection with the day school conducted by Mrs. Hill. This school was for the higher class of girls in Athens, and to this project Baldwin, devoted much of her own private fortune until it was a success, so that practically, she became the founder of Christian female education in the country.

During 1866, when the Christians of Crete revolted against the Turkish government, many impoverished and destitute Cretans fled to Athens. Among these refugees, Baldwin labored for two or more years with great success, establishing day schools and Sunday schools, feeding the hungry, providing the women and girls with material for work, and teaching them to sew and knit, and thus giving employment to hundreds. As the Cretans returned to their home, Baldwin felt that, having spent 33 years there, her work in Greece was done, and she requested the Missionary Committee to transfer her to Jaffa —the ancient Joppa— as her nephew had been appointed consul.

=== Jaffa ===
The transfer was approved, and in 1869, she went to live with her sister, Ann Maury Hay, and nephew, John Baldwin Hay, to assist in the Protestant schools. She became associated with Miss Arnott, a Scotch woman, who for some time had been teaching a girls' school. Here was a great field among Jews, Greek Christians, and Muslims. She had often spoken of Palestine and was pleased when she commenced laboring in Joppa.

On account of failure in sight, she was compelled to sever her relations with Miss Arnott's school, but, after rest and medical treatment, she established a boys' school. Funds being required to put up a building, she returned, after an absence of 25 years, to the United States in 1872, and collected money for the purpose. While visiting one of the churches, she fell, meeting with a serious injury, and from the time of her fall to her death, she was seldom free from pain, day or night.

== Death and legacy ==
Baldwin returned, however, to carry on, and was supremely happy in her work, the associations of Palestine having a charm for her. She died June 21, 1877, after 42 years of service. She was buried in the English cemetery in Jaffa, and friends placed over her a tombstone of Greek marble with the inscription of the verse Romans 10:12:—"For there is no difference between the Jew and the Greek: for the same Lord over all is rich unto all that call upon him." After Baldwin's death, the Joppa Mission School was renamed. Mary Baldwin Memorial School.
