= Mary Baldwin University =

Private university in Staunton, Virginia, U.S.

Coordinates: 38°9′16.8″N 79°4′3.1″W

- Former names: Augusta Female Seminary (1842–1895); Mary Baldwin Seminary (1895–1923); Mary Baldwin College (1923–2016)
- Motto: Non pro tempore sed aeternitate
- Motto in English: Not for time but for eternity
- Type: Private university
- Established: 1842; 184 years ago
- Accreditation: SACSCOC
- Religious affiliation: Presbyterian Church (USA)
- Academic affiliations: CIC; APCU; WCC
- Endowment: $30.2 million (2019)
- President: Gary Daynes (interim)
- Faculty: 95 full-time, 118 part-time, 91% of full-time hold terminal degree
- Students: 1,761
- Undergraduates: 1,313
- Postgraduates: 227
- Doctoral students: 201
- Location: Staunton, Virginia, United States
- Campus: Small city, 58.5 acres
- Colors: Gold and white Each class has its own colors.
- Nickname: Fighting Squirrels
- Sporting affiliations: NCAA Division III – USA South
- Mascots: Baldwin the Fighting Squirrel and Gladys the Squirrel
- Website: marybaldwin.edu
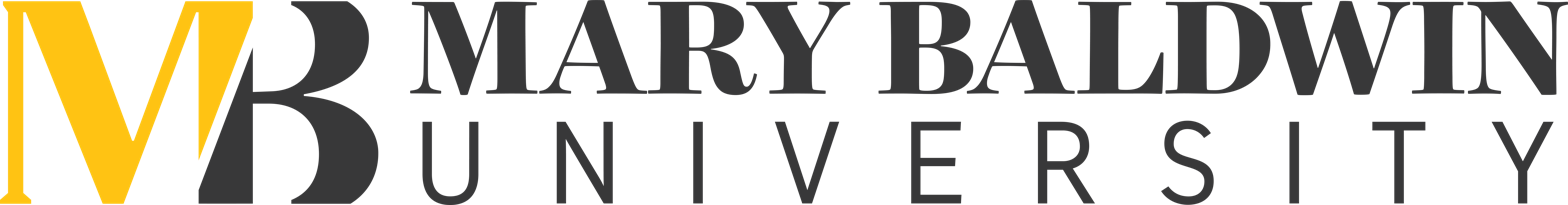

- Location within Shenandoah Valley Location within Virginia Location within the United States

Mary Baldwin University (MBU, formerly Mary Baldwin College) is a private university in Staunton, Virginia, United States. It was founded in 1842 as "Augusta Female Seminary". Mary Baldwin University is home to the Mary Baldwin College for Women, a residential college and women's college with a focus on liberal arts and leadership, as well as co-educational residential college for undergraduate programs within its University College structure. MBU also offers co-educational graduate degrees as well as undergraduate degree and certificate programs for working professionals and non-traditional students.

The university is the oldest institution of higher education for women in the nation affiliated with the Presbyterian Church (USA) and it is home to the only all-female corps of cadets in the world. Although the university is accredited by the Southern Association of Colleges and Schools Commission on Colleges, it was placed on probation in mid-2026 because of continuing concerns about its finances.

== History ==
Located in Staunton, Virginia within Augusta County, the university was founded as the "Augusta Female Seminary" in 1842 by Rufus William Bailey. Among the first students was Mary Julia Baldwin. In 1863, Baldwin was named principal and headed the school through the Civil War, although most schools in the area had closed due to the war and economic hardship.

In 1895, the school was renamed "Mary Baldwin Seminary" in honor of Baldwin. In 1923, the name changed to "Mary Baldwin College" when the school became a four-year institution.

In 1963, Mary Baldwin became racially de-segregated, officially ending its policy of admitting only white women.

In the mid-1970s, men began to be admitted as day students and graduate students. Four decades later, in 2017, the school began accepting residential male students, albeit not without some controversy at the time.

In 1976, when Staunton Military Academy (SMA) closed, its grounds and buildings were purchased by Mary Baldwin, expanding the campus from 19 to 58.5 acres (7.7 to 23.7 hectares).

In 1977, Mary Baldwin became the first college in Virginia to launch an adult degree program. Cynthia Haldenby Tyson was appointed as the eighth president in 1985. That same year, the Program for the Exceptionally Gifted (PEG) was established to allow academically gifted girls to earn bachelor's degrees.

In 1995, the Virginia Women's Institute for Leadership was established as the only all-female cadet corps. In 2001, the university established the Shakespeare and Performance graduate program after the American Shakespeare Center opened the Blackfriars Playhouse in Staunton.

In 2003, after 18 years as president, Cynthia Haldenby Tyson retired and Pamela Fox, dean of Miami University's School of Fine Arts, was named the ninth president.

In May 2015, the board of trustees voted unanimously to change the name of the institution to Mary Baldwin University, effective August 31, 2016, reflecting the school's range of bachelor's, master's, and doctoral programs.

On July 1, 2023, Jeffrey P. Stein began his tenure as Mary Baldwin University's tenth president after two decades at Elon University. On August 26, 2025, Stein abruptly resigned and was replaced by vice president Todd Telemeco. The university later announced on Nov. 10 that it discontinued 17 academic minors, including creative writing, African-American studies and physics.

On January 14, 2026, after protests from students, faculty and alumni, Todd Telemeco announced he would be stepping down as president for personal and family reasons at the end of the academic year. The Board of Trustees also announced the reinstatement of four academic minors – African American Studies, Art History, Religious Studies, and Sexuality and Gender Students. In June of the same year, the board of trustees announced that Gary Daynes would become MBU's 12th president with the title of Interim President and Chief Transformation Officer, effective July 1, 2026. A few days before stepping down, departing president Telemeco announced that the university's accreditation was placed on "Probation with Good Cause" because of continuing concerns about its finances by the Southern Association of Colleges and Schools.

== Academics ==
Mary Baldwin University offers Bachelor of Arts, Bachelor of Science and Bachelor of Social Work degrees in more than 30 majors. Undergraduate degrees are offered through the Mary Baldwin College for Women and two co-educational programs: University College and MBU Online. The school offers graduate degrees through the College of Education (Master of Arts in Teaching, Master of Education, Master of Science in Higher Education, and Master of Science in Applied Behavior Analysis), Murphy Deming College of Health Sciences (Doctor of Occupational Therapy, Doctor of Physical Therapy, Master of Science in Physician Assistant, and RN-to-BSN), and the Shakespeare and Performance program (Master of Letters and Master of Fine Arts).

Additionally, Mary Baldwin offers fast-track degrees, bachelor's-plus-master's-degree plans, professional school preparation and certificate programs. Community service and study-abroad opportunities are supplied through the Spencer Center for Civic and Global Engagement, which opened in 2007.

The university is accredited by the Southern Association of Colleges and Schools Commission on Colleges. The commission placed Mary Baldwin University on "probation for good cause" in June 2026 because of continuing concerns about its finances. This followed two years of monitoring and is the most serious status the accreditor can award an institution short of removing its accreditation altogether.

=== Institutional partnerships ===
The co-educational Master of Letters and Master of Fine Arts students in the Shakespeare and Performance program is partnered with the American Shakespeare Center, allowing the students to learn and perform in the Blackfriars Playhouse located a block away from campus.

The Heifetz International Music Institute, founded by violinist Daniel Heifetz, was moved from its Wolfeboro, New Hampshire location to Mary Baldwin University in 2012. The institute accepts applicants annually from around the world and offers summer programs for classically trained musicians.

MBU has also partnered with international organizations including the Clinton Global Initiative and Women for Women International to sponsor participants in Women for Women programs and raise awareness of human trafficking around the world.

Mary Baldwin has partnerships with several women's colleges around the world including Doshisha Women's College of Liberal Arts in Japan, Sungshin Women's University in South Korea, and Lady Doak College in India.

== Virginia Women's Institute for Leadership (VWIL) ==
Founded in 1995 by request of the Commonwealth of Virginia, VWIL (pronounced "vee-will") is an all-female cadet corps and four-year program preparing participants for both military and civilian leadership through academics, fitness, military training, practical experiences and co-curricular activities. Cadets also participate in co-educational ROTC training. Commandant of the corps of cadets is Brig. Gen. Teresa "Terry" A. H. Djuric (USAF, Retired).

== Program for the Exceptionally Gifted ==
The Program for the Exceptionally Gifted (PEG) at Mary Baldwin University is an early entrance college program for girls who have completed 6th-10th grade and have not yet completed, or in some cases not yet started, high school. Critically, the program accepts young women between the ages of 12 and 16. Applicants of later ages are encouraged to apply for early admission instead. The program was founded in 1985 with a class of 11 students and now enrolls up to 30 new students each year. Early success of the program was greatly boosted by the women-only residential campus, which eased parental concerns, as well as exceptionally strong participation and attention by faculty in providing extra challenges and opportunities to the gifted students. Participants ("PEGs") reside in a PEG-specific dorm building named for past president Cynthia Tyson, but attend classes with traditional-age students with the exception of a mandatory, PEG specific, introductory philosophy course named "Knowing the Self" (Phil 112). PEGs typically earn a bachelor's degree in the normal four years.

== Campus ==
The MBU main campus is located in Staunton, and its Murphy Deming College of Health Sciences is located in nearby Fishersville.

The first building on Staunton campus was the Mary Baldwin University, Main Building, built in 1844. The building now houses administrative offices and has been listed on the National Register of Historic Places (NRHP) since 1973.

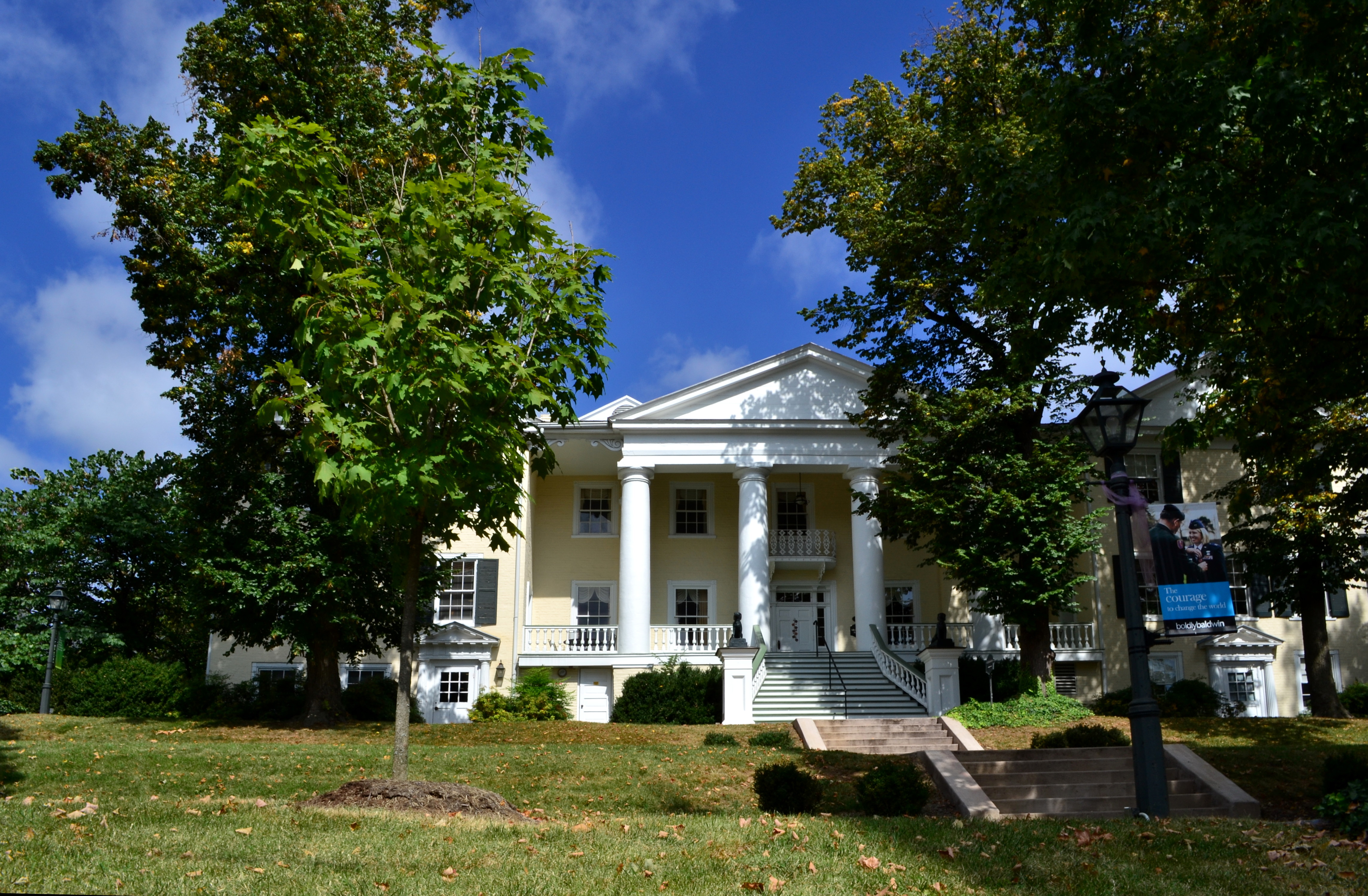
Main building

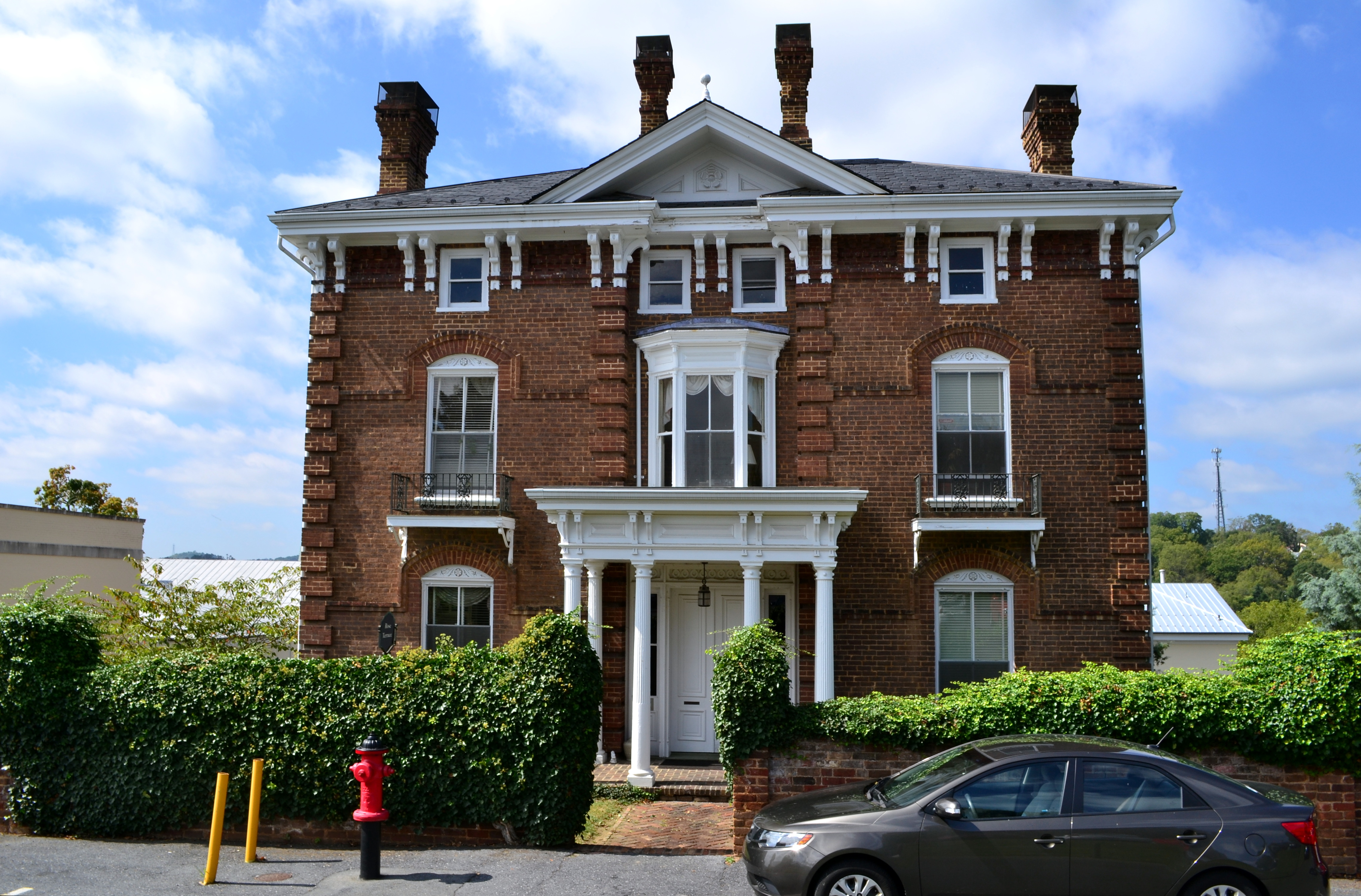
Rose Terrace

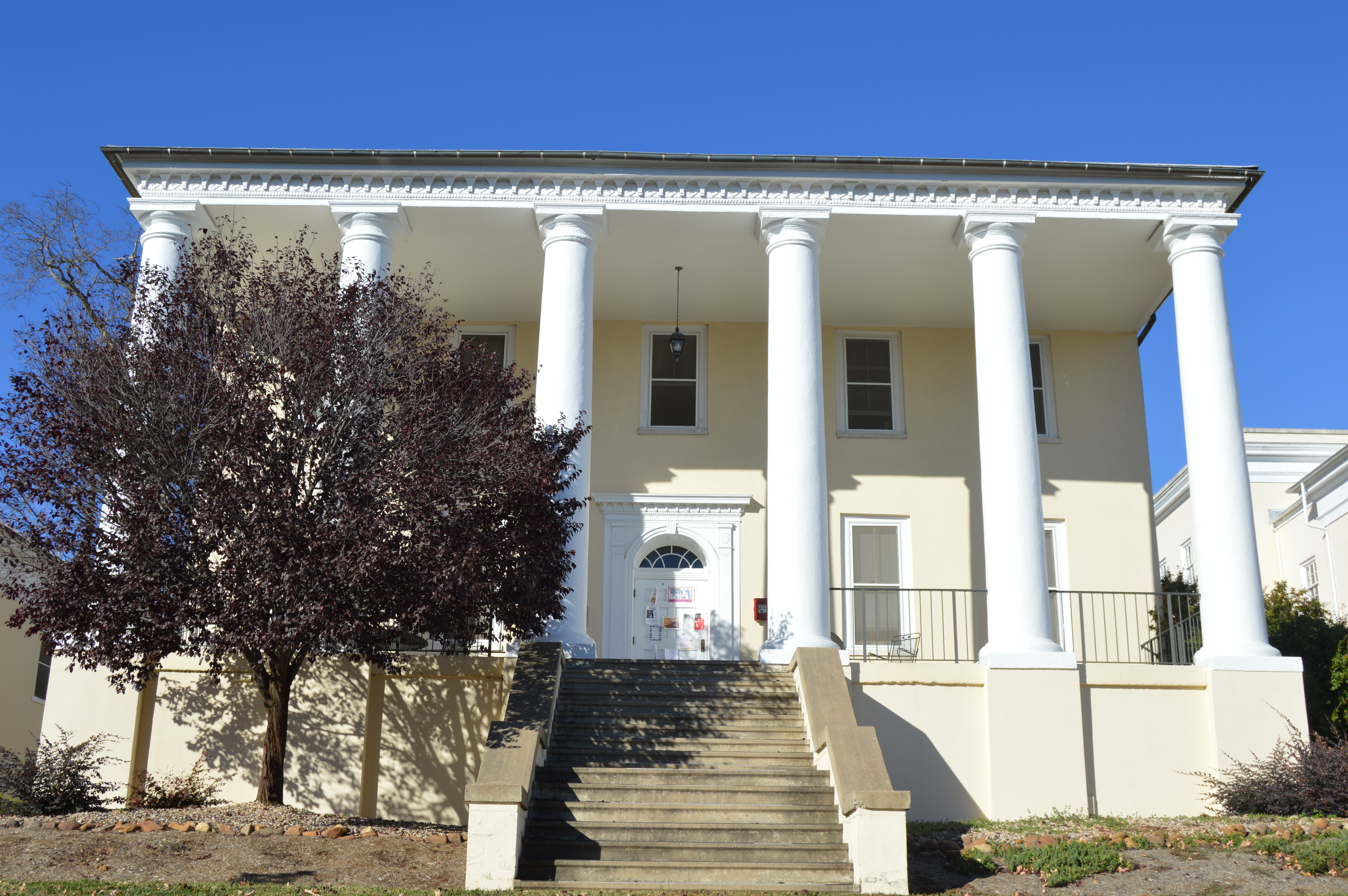
Portico

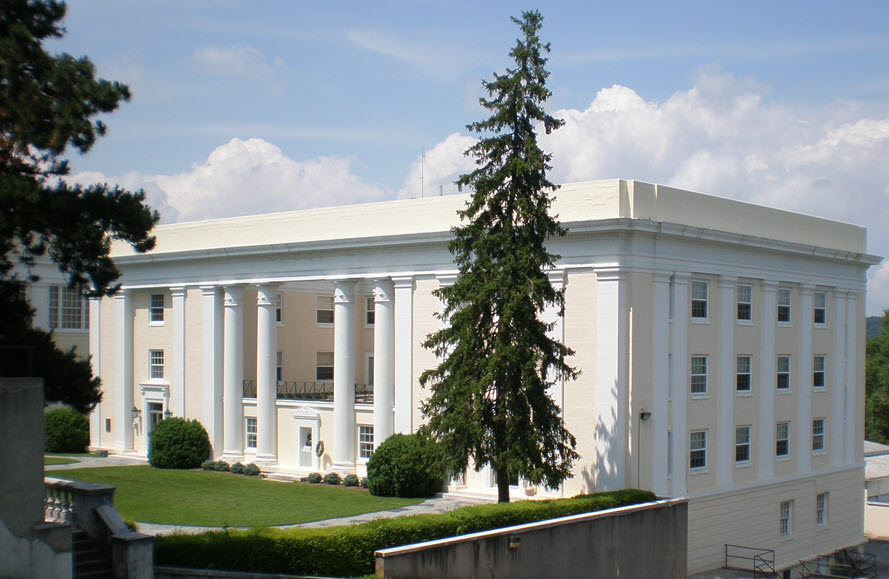
Staunton Military Kable Hall

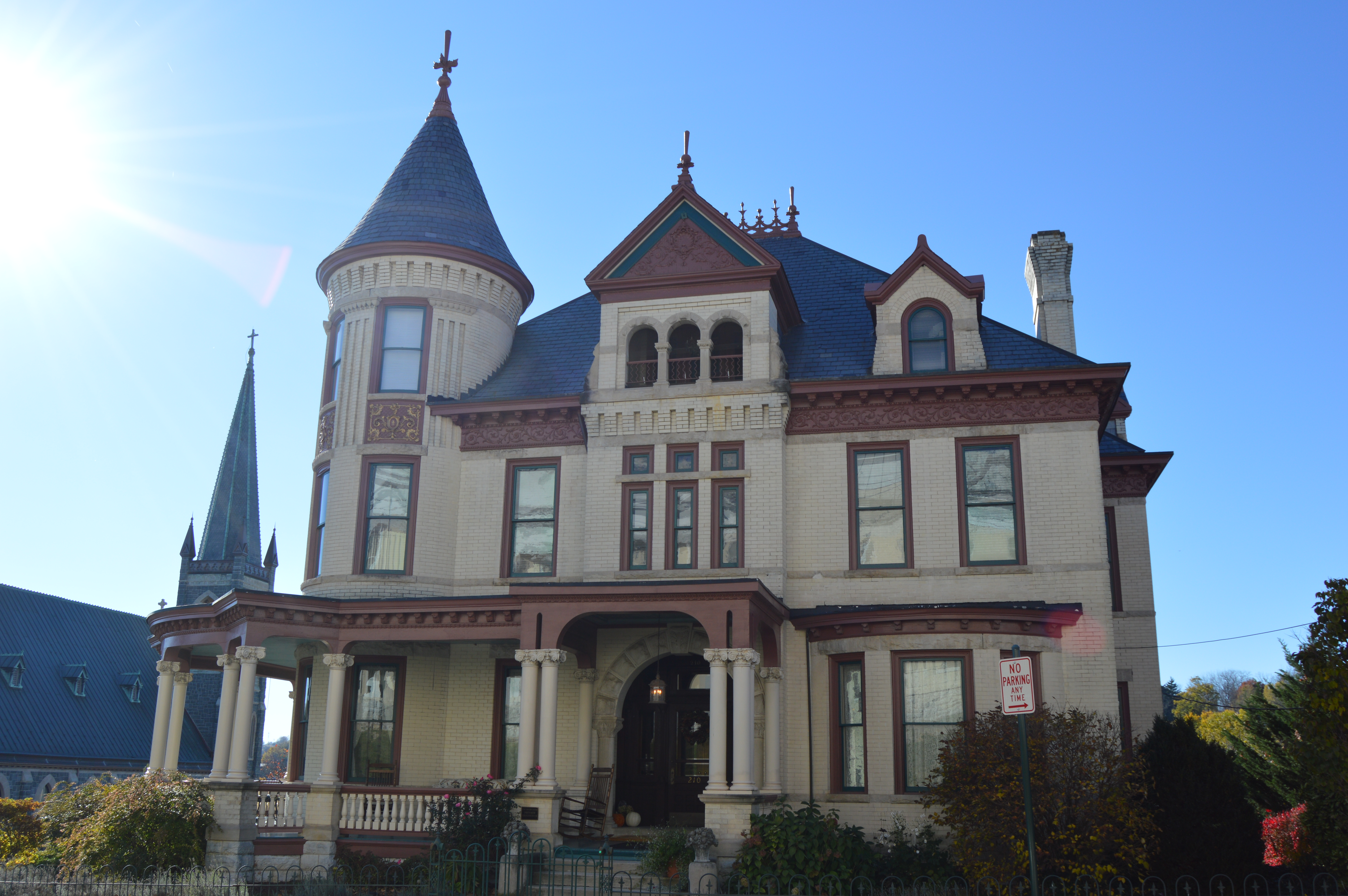
Miller House

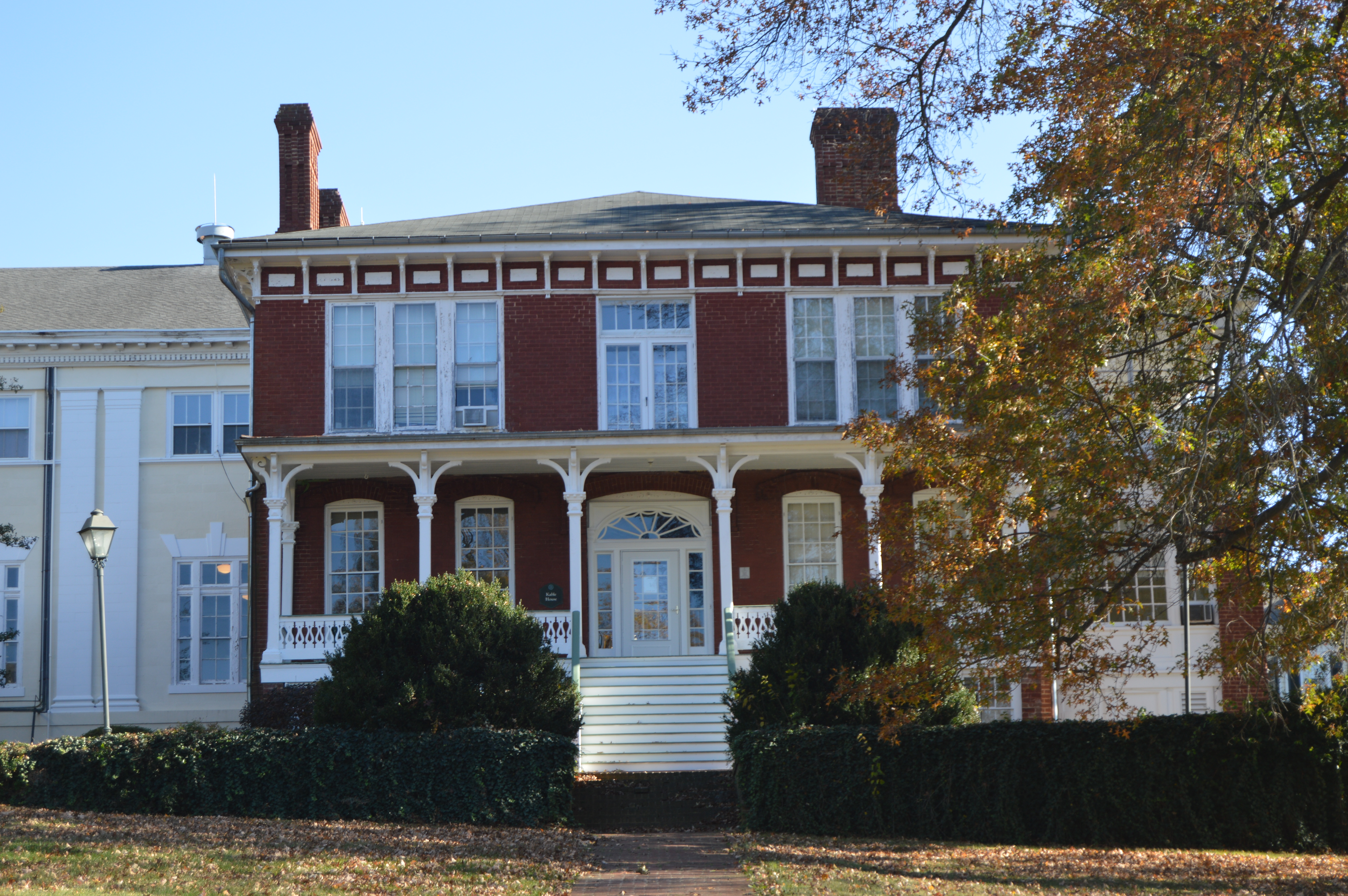
Kable House

== Traditions ==
MBU celebrates several annual traditions with the surrounding community. Every autumn, Mary Baldwin University commemorates Apple Day, during which students and faculty glean apples at a Virginia orchard. In recent years, the collected fruit has been distributed to area food pantries. The college also has marked Founders Day each October since 1898 to honor founders Mary Julia Baldwin and Rufus William Bailey.

The "Mary Baldwin College Fight Song" is sung to the tune of "Blue and Gold." The song was used by Staunton Military Academy (SMA) until it closed in 1976. After Mary Baldwin purchased the SMA campus, the college began using the academy's athletic fields, adopted the melody of the SMA fight song in 2008, and still flies SMA flags during parades. VWIL continues to hold an annual SMA reunion weekend involving a parade, banquet, and awarding of several scholarships.

== Athletics ==
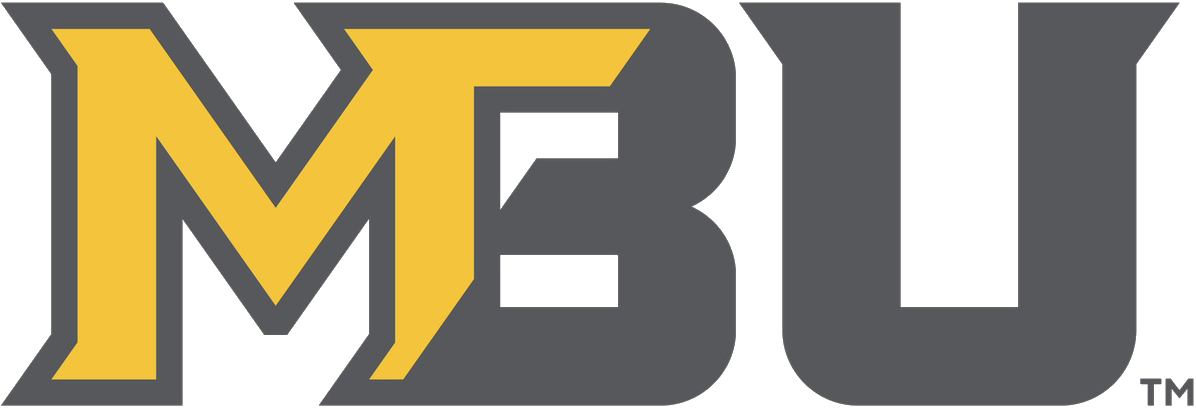
Mary Baldwin athletics mark

The Mary Baldwin athletic teams are called the Fighting Squirrels. The university is a member of the Division III ranks of the National Collegiate Athletic Association (NCAA), primarily competing in the USA South Athletic Conference (USA South) since the 2007–08 academic year. The Fighting Squirrels previously competed in the Atlantic Women's Colleges Conference (AWCC) from 1995–96 to 2006–07, and in the Old Dominion Athletic Conference (ODAC) from 1984–85 to 1991–92.

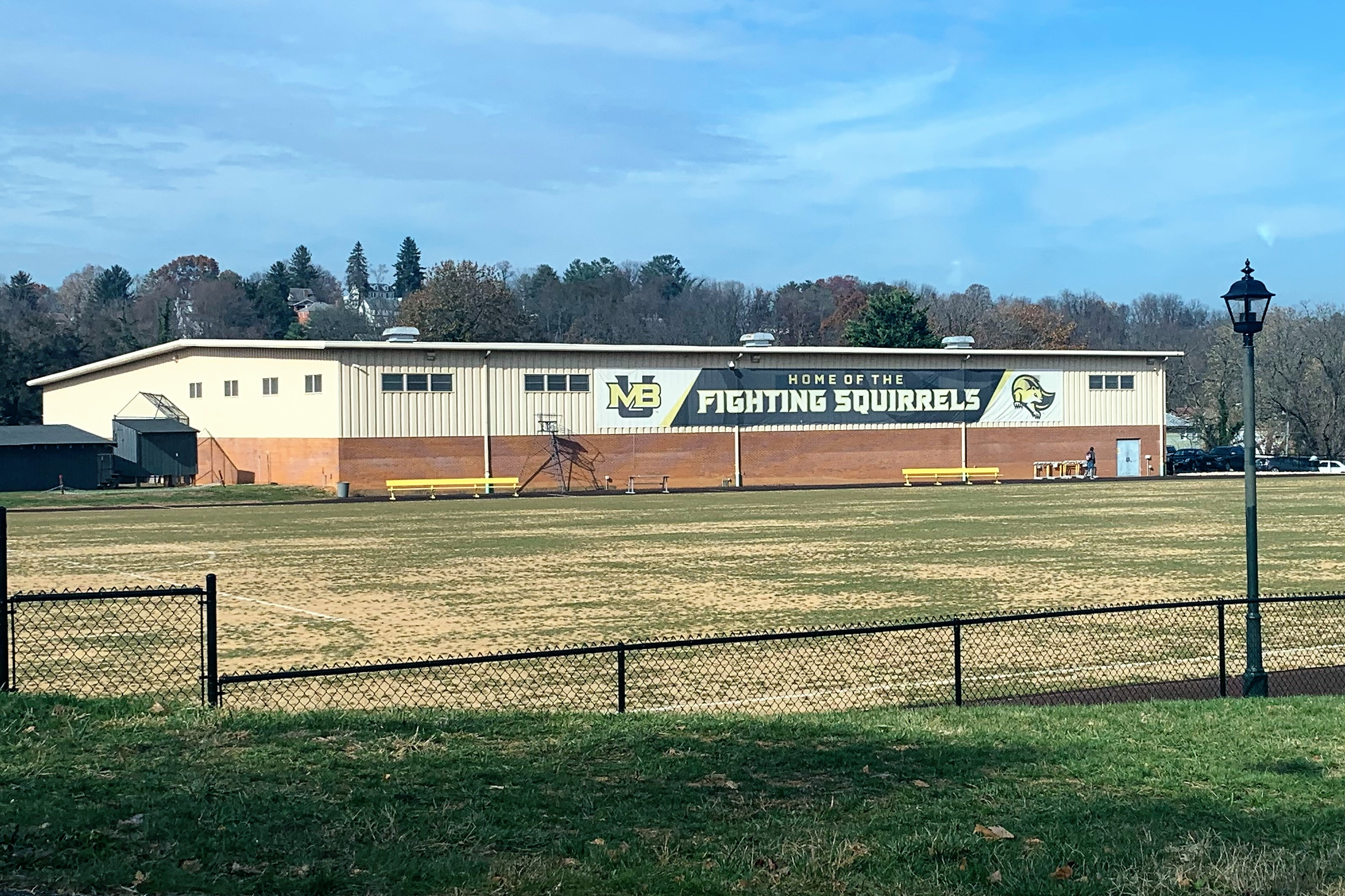
Athletics building and field at Mary Baldwin

Mary Baldwin competes in 13 intercollegiate varsity sports: Men's sports include baseball, basketball, cross country, soccer, tennis and track & field. Women's sports include basketball, cross country, soccer, softball, tennis, track & field and volleyball.

Mary Baldwin began to sponsor men's sports when the university became co-educational, effective in the 2019–20 school year; beginning with cross country, soccer, tennis and track & field, and later added were basketball and baseball for the 2021–22 school year.

=== Mascot ===
The original mascot of the Mary Baldwin athletics program was Gladys the Fighting Squirrel. Baldwin was introduced as the new athletics mascot in November 2019.

== Notable alumni ==
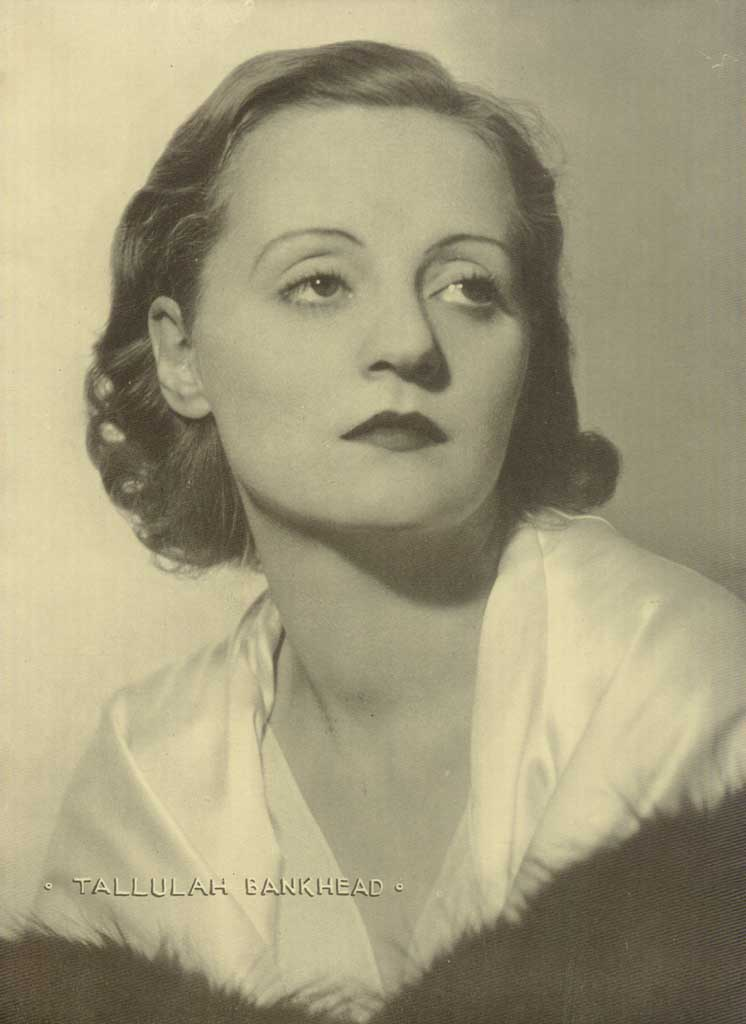
Tallulah Bankhead

- Julia McGehee Alexander, politician and lawyer
- Cora Lily Woodard Aycock, First Lady of North Carolina
- Tallulah Bankhead, actress
- Claudia Brind-Woody, IBM executive
- Dorie Clark, author and executive education professor
- Mary S. Cummins, educator
- Judith Godwin, abstract painter
- Caroline Rose Hunt, hotelier and philanthropist
- Anna Jarvis, founder of Mother's Day
- Louisa Venable Kyle, writer
- Custer LaRue, musician
- Lucille Foster McMillin, federal official
- Jason Narvy, actor
- Susan Schmidt, Pulitzer prize-winning journalist
- Susan Swecker, chair of the Virginia Democratic Party
- St. Clair Wright, historic preservationist

== See also ==
- Women's Colleges in the Southern United States
