= 1995 Virginia State Senate election =

The 1995 Virginia Senate election was held on Tuesday, November 7.

== Election results ==
District	Incumbent	Party	First elected	Result	Candidates
1	Hunter Andrews	Democratic	1963	Lost re-election Republican gain	Marty Williams (R) 52.53% Hunter Andrews (D) 47.45%
2	W. Henry Maxwell	Democratic	1992	Re-elected	W. Henry Maxwell (D) unopposed
3	Tommy Norment	Republican	1991	Re-elected	Tommy Norment (R) unopposed
4	Elmo G. Cross, Jr.	Democratic	1975	Lost re-election Republican gain	Bill Bolling (R) 50.54% Elmo G. Cross, Jr. (D) 49.46%
5	Yvonne B. Miller	Democratic	1987	Re-elected	Yvonne B. Miller (D) 76.67% F. P. Clay, Jr. (R) 23.31%
6	Stanley C. Walker	Democratic	1971	Re-elected	Stanley C. Walker (D) 54.86% Virginia D. Hahn (R) 45.12%
7	Clarence A. Holland	Democratic	1983	Lost re-election Republican gain	Ed Schrock (R) 55.82% Clarence A. Holland (D) 44.15%
8	Ken Stolle	Republican	1991	Re-elected	Ken Stolle (R) unopposed
9	Benjamin Lambert	Democratic	1985	Re-elected	Benjamin Lambert (D) unopposed
10	Joseph B. Benedetti	Republican	1986	Re-elected	Joseph B. Benedetti (R) unopposed
11	Stephen H. Martin	Republican	1994	Re-elected	Stephen H. Martin (R) unopposed
12	Walter Stosch	Republican	1991	Re-elected	Walter Stosch (R) 77.11% Murray L. Steinberg (I) 22.84%
13	Fred Quayle	Republican	1991	Re-elected	Fred Quayle (R) 51.28% Johnny Joannou (D) 48.68%
14	Mark Earley	Republican	1987	Re-elected	Mark Earley (R) 79.86% Mark W. Walker (I) 20.01%
15	Richard J. Holland	Democratic	1979	Re-elected	Richard J. Holland (D) 53.31% Jerry B. Flowers, III (R) 46.68%
16	Henry L. Marsh	Democratic	1991	Re-elected	Henry L. Marsh (D) unopposed
17	Edd Houck	Democratic	1983	Re-elected	Edd Houck (D) 53.42% J. Russ Moulton, Jr. (R) 46.56%
18	Louise Lucas	Democratic	1991	Re-elected	Louise Lucas (D) 58.43% Franklin Marshall Slayton (I) 41.56%
19	Charles R. Hawkins	Republican	1991	Re-elected	Charles R. Hawkins (R) 70.76% Joyce E. Glaise (D) 29.24%
20	Virgil Goode	Democratic	1973	Re-elected	Virgil Goode (D) unopposed
21	J. Brandon Bell	Republican	1991	Lost re-election Democratic gain	John S. Edwards (D) 54.56% J. Brandon Bell (R) 45.43%
22	Malfourd W. Trumbo	Republican	1991	Re-elected	Malfourd W. Trumbo (R) unopposed
23	Elliot S. Schewel	Democratic	1975	Retired; Republican gain	Stephen Newman (R) 65.28% Barbara J. Coleman (D) 34.67%
24	Frank W. Nolen	Democratic	1974	Lost re-election Republican gain	Emmett Hanger (R) 50.91% Frank W. Nolen (D) 46.33% Elise Sprunt Sheffield (I) 2.76%
25	Edgar S. Robb	Republican	1991	Loss re-election Democratic gain	Emily Couric (D) 50.10% Edgar S. Robb (R) 45.19% Donal B. Day (I) 3.73% Eric P. Strzepek (I) 0.92%
26	Kevin G. Miller	Republican	1983	Re-elected	Kevin G. Miller (R) unopposed
27	Russ Potts	Republican	1991	Re-elected	Russ Potts (R) 65.21% Thomas A. Lewis (D) 34.77%
28	John Chichester	Republican	1978	Re-elected	John Chichester (R) unopposed
29	Charles Colgan	Democratic	1975	Re-elected	Charles Colgan (D) 58.15% James S. Long (R) 41.83%
30	Robert L. Calhoun	Republican	1988	Lost re-election Democratic gain	Patsy Ticer (D) 57.63% Robert L. Calhoun (R) 42.30%
31	Edward M. Holland	Democratic	1971	Retired; Democratic hold	Mary Margaret Whipple (D) 68.63% David Anthony Oblon (R) 31.29%
32	Janet Howell	Democratic	1991	Re-elected	Janet Howell (D) 57.27% Robert M. McDowell (R) 42.70%
33	Charles L. Waddell	Democratic	1971	Re-elected	Charles L. Waddell (D) 54.94% David N. Olson (R) 45.01%
34	Jane H. Woods	Republican	1991	Re-elected	Jane H. Woods (R) unopposed
35	Richard L. Saslaw	Democratic	1979	Re-elected	Richard L. Saslaw (D) 57.00% Paul R. Brubaker (R) 42.95%
36	Joseph V. Gartlan, Jr.	Democratic	1971	Re-elected	Joseph V. Gartlan, Jr. (D) 52.73% Stanford Parris (R) 47.23%
37	Warren Barry	Republican	1991	Re-elected	Warren Barry (R) unopposed
38	Jackson E. Reasor, Jr.	Democratic	1991	Re-elected	Jackson E. Reasor, Jr. (D) 63.73% Frank Nunez (R) 36.26%
39	Madison E. Marye	Democratic	1973	Re-elected	Madison E. Marye (D) 52.96% Patrick D. Cupp (R) 47.04%
40	William C. Wampler, Jr.	Republican	1987	Re-elected	William C. Wampler, Jr. (R) unopposed
