= 1995 Virginia Senate election =

1995 Virginia Senate elections
- November 7, 1995

All 40 seats in the Senate of Virginia 21 seats needed for a majority
- Turnout: 52.2% ▲3.1 pp
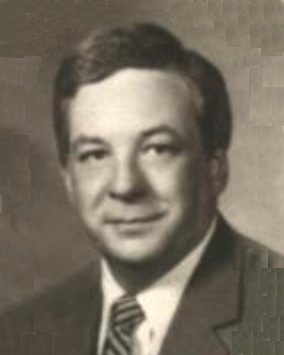

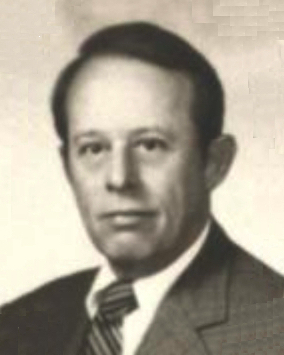
	Majority party	Minority party
Leader	Joseph B. Benedetti	Hunter Andrews (lost re-election)
Party	Republican	Democratic
Leader since	January 8, 1992	January 9, 1980
Leader's seat	10th	1st
Last election	18 seats, 41.7%	22 seats, 54.8%
Seats won	20	20
Seat change	▲2	▼2
Popular vote	764,025	581,008
Percentage	55.3%	42.0%
Swing	▲13.6 pp	▼12.8 pp
- Results: Democratic hold Democratic gain Republican hold Republican gain
Majority leader before election
Hunter Andrews
Democratic
Elected Majority leader
None

The Virginia Senate election of 1995 was held on Tuesday, November 7. Democrats lost their majority, thus forcing Republicans and Democrats to negotiate a power-sharing agreement to split control of the chamber. Republicans won a 1997 special election to claim the majority in the chamber after Democrat Charles L. Waddell resigned his seat.

== Overall results ==
↓
20	20
Republican	Democratic

Parties		Seats				Popular Vote		
Parties		1991	1995	+/-	Strength	Vote	%	Change
	Democratic	18	20	▲2	50.00%	764,025		▲
	Republican	22	20	▼2	50.00%	581,008		▼
	Independent	0	0	Steady	0.00%			
-	Write-ins	0	0	Steady	0.00%			
Total		40	40	0	100.00%		100.00%	-

== Election results ==
District	Incumbent	Party	First elected	Result	Candidates
1	Hunter Andrews	Democratic	1963	Lost re-election Republican gain	Marty Williams (R) 52.53% Hunter Andrews (D) 47.45%
2	W. Henry Maxwell	Democratic	1992	Re-elected	W. Henry Maxwell (D) unopposed
3	Tommy Norment	Republican	1991	Re-elected	Tommy Norment (R) unopposed
4	Elmo Cross	Democratic	1975	Lost re-election Republican gain	Bill Bolling (R) 50.54% Elmo Cross (D) 49.46%
5	Yvonne B. Miller	Democratic	1987	Re-elected	Yvonne B. Miller (D) 76.67% F. P. Clay Jr. (R) 23.31%
6	Stanley C. Walker	Democratic	1971	Re-elected	Stanley C. Walker (D) 54.86% Virginia D. Hahn (R) 45.12%
7	Clarence A. Holland	Democratic	1983	Lost re-election Republican gain	Ed Schrock (R) 55.82% Clarence A. Holland (D) 44.15%
8	Ken Stolle	Republican	1991	Re-elected	Ken Stolle (R) unopposed
9	Benjamin Lambert	Democratic	1985	Re-elected	Benjamin Lambert (D) unopposed
10	Joseph B. Benedetti	Republican	1986	Re-elected	Joseph B. Benedetti (R) unopposed
11	Stephen H. Martin	Republican	1994	Re-elected	Stephen H. Martin (R) unopposed
12	Walter Stosch	Republican	1991	Re-elected	Walter Stosch (R) 77.11% Murray L. Steinberg (I) 22.84%
13	Fred Quayle	Republican	1991	Re-elected	Fred Quayle (R) 51.28% Johnny Joannou (D) 48.68%
14	Mark Earley	Republican	1987	Re-elected	Mark Earley (R) 79.86% Mark W. Walker (I) 20.01%
15	Richard J. Holland	Democratic	1979	Re-elected	Richard J. Holland (D) 53.31% Jerry B. Flowers, III (R) 46.68%
16	Henry L. Marsh	Democratic	1991	Re-elected	Henry L. Marsh (D) unopposed
17	Edd Houck	Democratic	1983	Re-elected	Edd Houck (D) 53.42% J. Russ Moulton Jr. (R) 46.56%
18	Louise Lucas	Democratic	1991	Re-elected	Louise Lucas (D) 58.43% Franklin Marshall Slayton (I) 41.56%
19	Charles R. Hawkins	Republican	1991	Re-elected	Charles R. Hawkins (R) 70.76% Joyce E. Glaise (D) 29.24%
20	Virgil Goode	Democratic	1973	Re-elected	Virgil Goode (D) unopposed
21	J. Brandon Bell	Republican	1991	Lost re-election Democratic gain	John S. Edwards (D) 54.56% J. Brandon Bell (R) 45.43%
22	Malfourd W. Trumbo	Republican	1991	Re-elected	Malfourd W. Trumbo (R) unopposed
23	Elliot S. Schewel	Democratic	1975	Retired; Republican gain	Stephen Newman (R) 65.28% Barbara J. Coleman (D) 34.67%
24	Frank W. Nolen	Democratic	1974	Lost re-election Republican gain	Emmett Hanger (R) 50.91% Frank W. Nolen (D) 46.33% Elise Sprunt Sheffield (I) 2.76%
25	Edgar S. Robb	Republican	1991	Loss re-election Democratic gain	Emily Couric (D) 50.10% Edgar S. Robb (R) 45.19% Donal B. Day (I) 3.73% Eric P. Strzepek (I) 0.92%
26	Kevin G. Miller	Republican	1983	Re-elected	Kevin G. Miller (R) unopposed
27	Russ Potts	Republican	1991	Re-elected	Russ Potts (R) 65.21% Thomas A. Lewis (D) 34.77%
28	John Chichester	Republican	1978	Re-elected	John Chichester (R) unopposed
29	Charles Colgan	Democratic	1975	Re-elected	Charles Colgan (D) 58.15% James S. Long (R) 41.83%
30	Robert L. Calhoun	Republican	1988	Lost re-election Democratic gain	Patsy Ticer (D) 57.63% Robert L. Calhoun (R) 42.30%
31	Edward M. Holland	Democratic	1971	Retired; Democratic hold	Mary Margaret Whipple (D) 68.63% David Anthony Oblon (R) 31.29%
32	Janet Howell	Democratic	1991	Re-elected	Janet Howell (D) 57.27% Robert M. McDowell (R) 42.70%
33	Charles L. Waddell	Democratic	1971	Re-elected	Charles L. Waddell (D) 54.94% David N. Olson (R) 45.01%
34	Jane H. Woods	Republican	1991	Re-elected	Jane H. Woods (R) unopposed
35	Richard L. Saslaw	Democratic	1979	Re-elected	Richard L. Saslaw (D) 57.00% Paul R. Brubaker (R) 42.95%
36	Joseph V. Gartlan Jr.	Democratic	1971	Re-elected	Joseph V. Gartlan Jr. (D) 52.73% Stanford Parris (R) 47.23%
37	Warren Barry	Republican	1991	Re-elected	Warren Barry (R) unopposed
38	Jackson Reasor	Democratic	1991	Re-elected	Jackson Reasor (D) 63.73% Frank Nunez (R) 36.26%
39	Madison E. Marye	Democratic	1973	Re-elected	Madison E. Marye (D) 52.96% Patrick D. Cupp (R) 47.04%
40	William C. Wampler Jr.	Republican	1987	Re-elected	William C. Wampler Jr. (R) unopposed

== See also ==
- United States elections, 1995
- Virginia elections, 1995
  - Virginia House of Delegates election, 1995
