= 1991 Virginia Senate election =

1991 Virginia Senate elections
- November 5, 1991

All 40 seats in the Senate of Virginia 21 seats needed for a majority
- Turnout: 49.1% ▼10.0 pp
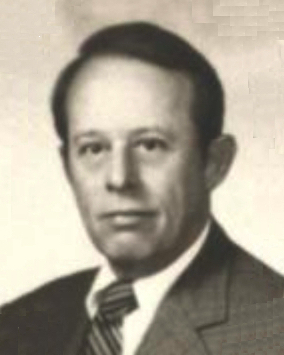

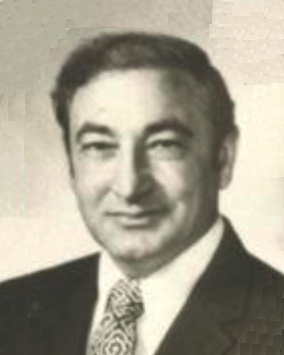
	Majority party	Minority party
Leader	Hunter Andrews	William A. Truban (retired)
Party	Democratic	Republican
Leader since	January 9, 1980	January 14, 1976
Leader's seat	1st	27th
Last election	30 seats, 63.2%	10 seats, 33.4%
Seats won	22	18
Seat change	▼8	▲8
Popular vote	657,012	499,273
Percentage	54.8%	41.7%
Swing	▼8.4 pp	▲8.3 pp
- Results: Democratic hold Republican hold Republican gain
Majority leader before election
Hunter Andrews
Democratic
Elected Majority leader
Hunter Andrews
Democratic

In the elections to the Senate of Virginia, United States in October 1991, the Republican Party gained 8 seats from the Democrats, but the Democrats retained a majority with 22 seats to the Republicans' 18. One electoral district was newly created and another two were merged into one.

== Overall results ==
↓
22	18
Democratic	Republican

Parties		Seats				Popular Vote		
Parties		1987	1991	+/-	Strength	Vote	%	Change
	Democratic	30	22	▼8	55.00%	657,012		▼
	Republican	10	18	▲8	45.00%	499,273		▲
	Independent	0	0	Steady	0.00%			
-	Write-ins	0	0	Steady	0.00%			
Total		40	40	0	100.00%		100.00%	-

== Results by district ==
District	Incumbent	Party	First elected	Result	Candidates
1	Hunter Andrews	Democratic	1963	Re-elected	Hunter Andrews (D) 52.44% Barry I. Epstein (R) 44.90% Lorene Marable-Safavinia (I) 2.63%
2	Robert C. Scott	Democratic	1982	Re-elected	Robert C. Scott (D) unopposed
3	William E. Fears	Democratic	1967	Lost re-election Republican gain	Tommy Norment (R) 54.27% William E. Fears (D) 45.71%
4	Elmo G. Cross, Jr.	Democratic	1975	Re-elected	Elmo G. Cross, Jr. (D) 62.15% Randy D. Barrack (R) 37.83%
5	Yvonne B. Miller	Democratic	1987	Re-elected	Yvonne B. Miller (D) 75.53% F. P. Clay, Jr. (R) 20.20% Loretta F. Chandler (I) 3.99%
6	Stanley C. Walker	Democratic	1971	Re-elected	Stanley C. Walker (D) 83.10% Alain E. Lareau, Jr. (R) 16.40%
7	Clarence A. Holland	Democratic	1983	Re-elected	Clarence A. Holland (D) 53.41% Mark S. Bailey (R) 46.47%
8	Moody E. Stallings, Jr.	Democratic	1987	Lost re-election Republican gain	Ken Stolle (R) 54.02% Moody E. Stallings, Jr. (D) 45.80%
9	Benjamin Lambert	Democratic	1985	Re-elected	Benjamin Lambert (D) unopposed
10	Joseph B. Benedetti	Republican	1986	Re-elected	Joseph B. Benedetti (R) unopposed
11	Robert E. Russell, Sr.	Republican	1983	Re-elected	Robert E. Russell, Sr. (R) 53.54% Alexander B. McMurtrie, Jr. (D) 46.33%
12	Edwina P. Dalton	Republican	1987	Retired; Republican hold	Walter Stosch (R) 75.61% Charlotte L. Armstrong (D) 24.30%
13	Johnny Joannou	Democratic	1983	Lost re-election Republican gain	Fred Quayle (R) 50.78% Johnny Joannou (D) 49.20%
14	Mark Earley	Republican	1987	Re-elected	Mark Earley (R) 68.44% Johnny W. Butt (D) 31.51%
15	Richard J. Holland	Democratic	1979	Re-elected	Richard J. Holland (D) unopposed
16	Elmon T. Gray	Democratic	1971	Retired; Democratic hold	Henry L. Marsh (D) 60.10% Don A. Harrington, Jr. (I) 22.40% John C. Holden (I) 17.45%
17	Edd Houck	Democratic	1983	Re-elected	Edd Houck (D) 63.78% J. Russ Moulton, Jr. (R) 36.22%
18	Howard P. Anderson	Democratic	1971	Retired; Democratic hold	Louise Lucas (D) 51.88% Frank Ruff (R) 48.12%
19	William Onico Barker	Republican	1979	Retired; Republican hold	Charles R. Hawkins (R) unopposed
20	Virgil Goode	Democratic	1973	Re-elected	Virgil Goode (D) unopposed
21	Granger Macfarlane	Democratic	1983	Lost re-election Republican gain	J. Brandon Bell (R) 53.49% Granger Macfarlane (D) 46.45%
22	Dudley J. Emick	Democratic	1975	Retired; Republican gain	Malfourd W. Trumbo (R) 43.27% Francis E. Longaker (I) 28.87% A. Carole Pratt (I) 27.84%
23	Elliot S. Schewel	Democratic	1975	Re-elected	Elliot S. Schewel (D) unopposed
24	Frank W. Nolen	Democratic	1974	Re-elected	Frank W. Nolen (D) unopposed
25	Thomas J. Michie, Jr.	Democratic	1980	Loss re-election Republican gain	Edgar S. Robb (R) 50.76% Thomas J. Michie, Jr. (D) 49.20%
26	Kevin G. Miller	Republican	1983	Re-elected	Kevin G. Miller (R) 59.47% Margaret E. Haynes (D) 40.52%
27	William A. Truban	Republican	1971	Retired; Republican hold	Russ Potts (R) 49.61% Dennis L. Hupp (D) 31.35% Thomas A. Lewis (I) 17.20% Robert Lynwood Coffman (I) 1.83%
28	John Chichester	Republican	1978	Re-elected	John Chichester (R) 69.48% Edwin C. King (D) 30.52%
29	Charles Colgan	Democratic	1975	Re-elected	Charles Colgan (D) unopposed
30	Robert L. Calhoun	Republican	1988	Re-elected	Robert L. Calhoun (R) 65.25% Stanley R. Vosper, Jr. (D) 34.59%
31	Edward M. Holland	Democratic	1971	Re-elected	Edward M. Holland (D) 71.80% Francis J. Mahoney, Jr. (R) 28.02%
32	Clive L. DuVal	Democratic	1971	Retired; Democratic hold	Janet Howell (D) 52.46% Frederick T. Dykes (R) 47.41%
33	Charles L. Waddell	Democratic	1971	Re-elected	Charles L. Waddell (D) 48.98% Dennis G. Pierce (R) 25.83% Kristen C. Umstattd (I) 25.14%
34	Emilie F. Miller	Democratic	1987	Loss re-election Republican gain	Jane H. Woods (R) 52.06% Emiie F. Miller (D) 47.88%
35	Richard L. Saslaw	Democratic	1979	Re-elected	Richard L. Saslaw (D) 60.21% Christy Anne Marie Collins (R) 39.74%
36	Joseph V. Gartlan, Jr.	Democratic	1971	Re-elected	Joseph V. Gartlan, Jr. (D) 51.17% John M. Griswold (R) 48.71%
37	None (District created)			New seat Republican gain	Warren E. Barry (R) 60.60% James C. Tso (D) 39.32%
38	Daniel W. Bird, Jr.	Democratic	1975	Re-elected	Jackson E. Reasor, Jr. (D) unopposed
39	Madison E. Marye; Redistricted from the 37th district	Democratic	1973	Re-elected	Madison E. Marye (D) unopposed
40	J. Jack Kennedy Jr.	Democratic	1991	Loss redistricting contest Democratic loss	William C. Wampler, Jr. (R) 52.35% Joe Jack Kennedy, Jr. (D) 47.63%
40	William C. Wampler Jr. Redistricted from the 39th district	Republican	1987	Re-elected	William C. Wampler, Jr. (R) 52.35% Joe Jack Kennedy, Jr. (D) 47.63%

== See also ==
- United States elections, 1991
- Virginia elections, 1991
  - Virginia House of Delegates election, 1991
