= 1987 Virginia Senate election =

1987 Virginia Senate elections
- November 3, 1987

All 40 seats in the Senate of Virginia 21 seats needed for a majority
- Turnout: 59.1% ▲8.5 pp
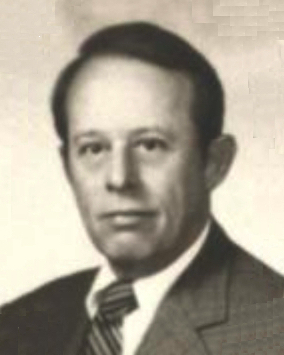

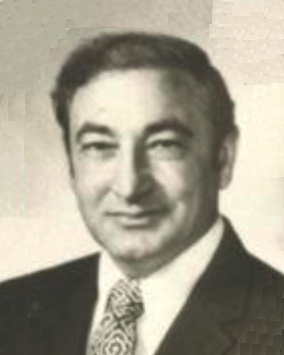
	Majority party	Minority party
Leader	Hunter Andrews	William A. Truban
Party	Democratic	Republican
Leader since	January 9, 1980	January 14, 1976
Leader's seat	1st	27th
Last election	32 seats, 64.0%	8 seats, 33.5%
Seats before	31	9
Seats won	30	10
Seat change	▼1	▲1
Popular vote	805,030	425,706
Percentage	63.2%	33.4%
Swing	▼0.8 pp	▼0.1 pp
- Results: Democratic hold Democratic gain Republican hold Republican gain
Majority leader before election
Hunter Andrews
Democratic
Elected Majority leader
Hunter Andrews
Democratic

All 40 seats in the Senate of Virginia were up for election on November 3, 1987, alongside the Virginia House of Delegates election.

== Overall results ==
↓
30	10
Democratic	Republican

Parties		Seats				Popular Vote		
Parties		1983	1987	+/-	Strength	Vote	%	Change
	Democratic	32	30	▼2	75.00%	805,030	63.16%	▼0.82%
	Republican	8	10	▲2	25.00%	425,706	33.40%	▼0.11%
	Independent	0	0	Steady	0.00%			
-	Write-ins	0	0	Steady	0.00%			
Total		40	40	0	100.00%	1,274,583	100.00%	-

== Results by district ==
District	Incumbent	Party	First elected	Result	Candidates
1	Hunter B. Andrews	Democratic	1963	Re-elected	Hunter B. Andrews (D) 66.32% Eleanor L. Rice (R) 33.68%
2	Robert C. Scott	Democratic	1982	Re-elected	Robert C. Scott (D) 57.34; Teddy R. Marks (R) 42.65%
3	William E. Fears	Democratic	1967	Re-elected	William E. Fears (D) unopposed
4	Elmo G. Cross Jr.	Democratic	1975	Re-elected	Elmo G. Cross Jr. (D) unopposed
5	Peter K. Babalas	Democratic	1967	Retired; Democratic hold	Yvonne B. Miller (D) 52.09% Julian F. Hirst (I) 33.45% R. Wayne Nunnally (R) 14.45%
6	Stanley C. Walker	Democratic	1971	Re-elected	Stanley C. Walker (D) unopposed
7	Clarence A. Holland	Democratic	1983	Re-elected	Clarence A. Holland (D) 77.23% Rae H. Le Sesne (I) 22.69%
8	A. Joe Canada Jr.	Republican	1971	Lost re-election Democratic gain	M. E. Stallings Jr. (D) 48.41% A. Joe Canada Jr. (R) 46.85% Louis Miles Pace (I) 4.69%
9	Benjamin Lambert	Democratic	1985	Re-elected	Benjamin Lambert (D) unopposed
10	Joseph B. Benedetti	Republican	1986	Re-elected	Joseph B. Benedetti (R) 84.39; Roger L. Coffey (I) 15.56%
11	Robert E. Russell Sr.	Republican	1983	Re-elected	Robert E. Russell Sr. (R) 55.08% Joan C. Girone (I) 44.82%
12	William F. Parkerson Jr.	Democratic	1963	Loss re-election Republican gain	Edwina P. Dalton (R) 50.91% William F. Parkerson Jr. (D) 49.06%
13	Johnny Joannou	Democratic	1983	Re-elected	Johnny Joannou (D) unopposed
14	William T. Parker	Democratic	1979	Loss re-election Republican gain	Mark Earley (R) 51.39% William T. Parker (D) 48.60%
15	Richard J. Holland	Democratic	1979	Re-elected	Richard J. Holland (D) unopposed
16	Elmon T. Gray	Democratic	1971	Re-elected	Elmon T. Gray (D) unopposed
17	Edd Houck	Democratic	1983	Re-elected	Edd Houck (D) 54.43% William J. Vakos Jr. (R) 45.52%
18	Howard P. Anderson	Democratic	1971	Re-elected	Howard P. Anderson (D) unopposed
19	William Onico Barker	Republican	1979	Re-elected	William Onico Barker (R) 70.68% Elosie F. Nenon (D) 29.31%
20	Virgil Goode	Democratic	1973	Re-elected	Virgil Goode (D) unopposed
21	J. Granger Macfarlane	Democratic	1983	Re-elected	J. Granger Macfarlane (D) 63.34% William H. Flanagan (R) 36.65%
22	Dudley J. Emick	Democratic	1975	Re-elected	Dudley J. Emick (D) 64.86% Lee B. Eddy (R) 35.13%
23	Elliot S. Schewel	Democratic	1975	Re-elected	Elliot S. Schewel (D) 77.28% Jeffery D. Somers (I) 22.71%
24	Frank W. Nolen	Democratic	1974	Re-elected	Frank W. Nolen (D) 66.90% Bertram C. Hopeman (R) 33.09%
25	Thomas J. Michie Jr.	Democratic	1980	Re-elected	Thomas J. Michie Jr. (D) unopposed
26	Kevin G. Miller	Republican	1983	Re-elected	Kevin G. Miller (R) 58.69% William C. Chase Jr. (D) 41.30%
27	William A. Truban	Republican	1971	Re-elected	William A. Truban (R) unopposed
28	John Chichester	Republican	1978	Re-elected	John Chichester (R) 68.33% Ann Riley Smith (D) 31.66%
29	Charles Colgan	Democratic	1975	Re-elected	Charles Colgan (D) unopposed
30	Wiley F. Mitchell	Republican	1975	Re-elected	Wiley F. Mitchell (R) unopposed
31	Edward M. Holland	Democratic	1971	Re-elected	Edward M. Holland (D) 59.69% Joseph V. Vasapoli (R) 40.30%
32	Clive L. DuVal	Democratic	1971	Re-elected	Clive L. DuVal (D) 53.68% Bobbie Kilberg (R) 46.30%
33	Charles L. Waddell	Democratic	1971	Re-elected	Charles L. Waddell (D) unopposed
34	John W. Russell	Republican	1983	Loss re-election Democratic gain	Emilie F. Miller (D) 50.25% John W. Russell (R) 49.75%
35	Richard L. Saslaw	Democratic	1979	Re-elected	Richard L. Saslaw (D) unopposed
36	Joseph V. Gartlan Jr.	Democratic	1971	Re-elected	Joseph V. Gartlan Jr. (D) 58.28% Ronald C. Smith (R) 41.71%
37	Madison E. Marye	Democratic	1973	Re-elected	Madison E. Marye (D) unopposed
38	Daniel W. Bird Jr.	Democratic	1975	Re-elected	Daniel W. Bird Jr. (D) 76.14% Benjamin S. Barringer (R) 23.85%
39	James P. Jones	Democratic	1983	Retired; Republican gain	William C. Wampler Jr. (R) 50.04% John S. Bundy (D) 49.96%
40	John Chalkley Buchanan	Democratic	1971	Re-elected	John Chalkley Buchanan (D) unopposed

== See also ==
- United States elections, 1987
- Virginia elections, 1987
  - Virginia House of Delegates election, 1987
