= 2007 Virginia Senate election =

- November 6, 2007

All 40 seats in the Virginia Senate 21 (Note: A majority of 20 is also possible as the Lt. Gov. of Virginia holds a tie-breaker vote.) seats needed for a majority
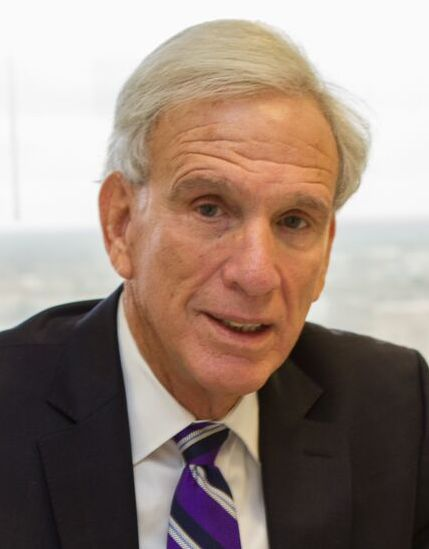

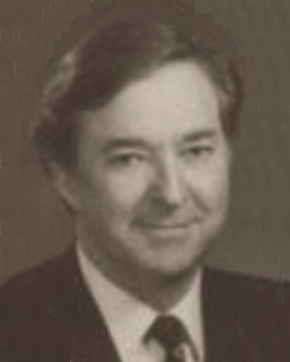
	Majority party	Minority party
Leader	Dick Saslaw	Walter Stosch
Party	Democratic	Republican
Leader since	January 10, 1996	January 13, 1998
Leader's seat	District 35	District 12
Last election	16	24
Seats before	17 (Note: Democrats flipped one seat in a special election.)	23
Seats after	21	19
Seat change	▲4	▼4
- Results: Democratic hold Democratic gain Republican hold
Majority Leader before election
Walter Stosch
Republican
Elected Majority Leader
Dick Saslaw
Democratic

The 2007 Virginia Senate election was held on November 6, 2007, to determine which party would control the Virginia Senate for the following four years in the 155th Virginia General Assembly. All 40 seats in the Virginia Senate were up for election. Prior to the election, 24 seats were held by Republicans and 16 seats were held by Democrats. The general election saw Democrats flip 5 seats, thereby gaining a majority in the State Senate for the first time since 1995.

== Retirements ==
=== Republicans ===
1. District 19: Charles R. Hawkins retired.
2. District 27: Russ Potts retired.
3. District 28: John Chichester retired.

== Defeated incumbents ==
=== In primary ===
==== Republicans ====
1. District 1: Marty Williams lost renomination to Patricia Stall.
2. District 22: Brandon Bell lost renomination to Ralph K. Smith.

==== Democrats ====
1. District 9: Benjamin Lambert lost renomination to Donald McEachin.

=== In general ===
==== Republicans ====
1. District 6: Nick Rerras lost re-election to Ralph Northam.
2. District 34: Jeannemarie Devolites Davis lost re-election to Chap Petersen.
3. District 39: Jay O'Brien lost re-election to George Barker.

== Closest races ==
Seats where the margin of victory was under 10%:

1. District 37, 0.20%
2. District 27, 1.20%
3. District 28, 1.40%
4. District 22, 1.80%
5. District 39, 1.90% (gain)
6. District 1, 2.50% (gain)
7. District 29, 8.30%
8. District 6, 8.80% (gain)

== Results ==
=== District 1 ===
District 1 election, 2007
Party	Candidate	Votes	%
Democratic	Sharon Hewitt	15,502	51.10%
Republican	Patricia Stall	14,771	48.60%
	Scattering	93	0.30%
Total votes		30,366	100.0%
Democratic gain from Republican			

=== District 2 ===
District 2 election, 2007
Party	Candidate	Votes	%
Democratic	Mamie Locke (incumbent)	12,242	94.10%
	Scattering	772	5.90%
Total votes		13,014	100.0%
Democratic hold			

=== District 3 ===
District 3 election, 2007
Party	Candidate	Votes	%
Republican	Tommy Norment (incumbent)	29,669	95.10%
	Scattering	1,531	4.90%
Total votes		31,200	100.0%
Republican hold			

=== District 4 ===
District 4 election, 2007
Party	Candidate	Votes	%
Republican	Ryan McDougle (incumbent)	33,148	98.30%
	Scattering	571	1.70%
Total votes		33,719	100.0%
Republican hold			

=== District 5 ===
District 5 election, 2007
Party	Candidate	Votes	%
Democratic	Yvonne B. Miller (incumbent)	10,977	96.90%
	Scattering	350	3.10%
Total votes		11,327	100.0%
Democratic hold			

=== District 6 ===
District 6 election, 2007
Party	Candidate	Votes	%
Democratic	Ralph Northam	17,307	54.30%
Republican	Nick Rerras (incumbent)	14,499	45.50%
	Scattering	45	0.20%
Total votes		31,851	100.0%
Democratic gain from Republican			

=== District 7 ===
District 7 election, 2007
Party	Candidate	Votes	%
Republican	Frank Wagner (incumbent)	15,426	96.80%
	Scattering	517	3.20%
Total votes		15,943	100.0%
Republican hold			

=== District 8 ===
District 8 election, 2007
Party	Candidate	Votes	%
Republican	Ken Stolle (incumbent)	13,137	95.60%
	Scattering	606	4.40%
Total votes		13,743	100.0%
Republican hold			

=== District 9 ===
District 9 election, 2007
Party	Candidate	Votes	%
Democratic	Donald McEachin	16,782	80.90%
Independent	Silver Persinger	3,789	18.30%
	Scattering	169	0.80%
Total votes		20,740	100.0%
Democratic hold			

=== District 10 ===
District 10 election, 2007
Party	Candidate	Votes	%
Republican	John Watkins (incumbent)	27,515	97.60%
	Scattering	689	2.40%
Total votes		28,204	100.0%
Republican hold			

=== District 11 ===
District 11 election, 2007
Party	Candidate	Votes	%
Republican	Steve Martin (incumbent)	16,478	62.40%
Democratic	Alex McMurtie Jr.	4,852	18.40%
Independent	Roger Habeck	3,879	14.70%
Independent	Hank Cook	1,138	4.30%
	Scattering	54	0.20%
Total votes		26,401	100.0%
Republican hold			

=== District 12 ===
District 12 election, 2007
Party	Candidate	Votes	%
Republican	Walter Stosch (incumbent)	26,265	97.30%
	Scattering	737	2.70%
Total votes		27,002	100.0%
Republican hold			

=== District 13 ===
District 13 election, 2007
Party	Candidate	Votes	%
Republican	Fred Quayle (incumbent)	21,114	58.60%
Democratic	Steve Heretick	14,821	41.10%
	Scattering	83	0.30%
Total votes		36,018	100.0%
Republican hold			

=== District 14 ===
District 14 election, 2007
Party	Candidate	Votes	%
Republican	Harry Blevins (incumbent)	13,402	70.80%
Libertarian	W. Donald Tabor Jr.	5,455	28.80%
	Scattering	66	0.40%
Total votes		18,923	100.0%
Republican hold			

=== District 15 ===
District 15 election, 2007
Party	Candidate	Votes	%
Republican	Frank Ruff (incumbent)	25,429	59.00%
Democratic	Bob Wilkerson	17,658	40.90%
	Scattering	37	0.10%
Total votes		43,124	100.0%
Republican hold			

=== District 16 ===
District 16 election, 2007
Party	Candidate	Votes	%
Democratic	Henry L. Marsh (incumbent)	11,186	66.60%
Independent	Robert Owens	5,557	33.10%
	Scattering	45	0.30%
Total votes		16,788	100.0%
Democratic hold			

=== District 17 ===
District 17 election, 2007
Party	Candidate	Votes	%
Democratic	Edd Houck (incumbent)	25,178	56.00%
Republican	Chris Yakabouski	19,754	43.90%
	Scattering	36	0.10%
Total votes		44,968	100.0%
Democratic hold			

=== District 18 ===
District 18 election, 2007
Party	Candidate	Votes	%
Democratic	Louise Lucas (incumbent)	20,260	98.50%
	Scattering	311	1.50%
Total votes		20,571	100.0%
Democratic hold			

=== District 19 ===
District 19 election, 2007
Party	Candidate	Votes	%
Republican	Robert Hurt	29,735	75.70%
Independent	Sherman Witcher	9,488	24.20%
	Scattering	46	0.10%
Total votes		39,269	100.0%
Republican hold			

=== District 20 ===
District 20 election, 2007
Party	Candidate	Votes	%
Democratic	Roscoe Reynolds (incumbent)	30,365	63.00%
Republican	Willis Jeffery Evans	17,804	36.90%
	Scattering	60	0.10%
Total votes		48,229	100.0%
Democratic hold			

=== District 21 ===
District 21 election, 2007
Party	Candidate	Votes	%
Democratic	John S. Edwards (incumbent)	22,282	98.20%
	Scattering	416	1.80%
Total votes		22,698	100.0%
Democratic hold			

=== District 22 ===
District 22 election, 2007
Party	Candidate	Votes	%
Republican	Ralph K. Smith	21,193	50.80%
Democratic	Michael Breiner	20,452	49.00%
	Scattering	112	0.20%
Total votes		41,757	100.0%
Republican hold			

=== District 23 ===
District 23 election, 2007
Party	Candidate	Votes	%
Republican	Stephen Newman (incumbent)	20,269	97.20%
	Scattering	583	2.80%
Total votes		20,852	100.0%
Republican hold			

=== District 24 ===
District 24 election, 2007
Party	Candidate	Votes	%
Republican	Emmett Hanger (incumbent)	23,896	65.40%
Democratic	R. David Cox	9,757	26.70%
Libertarian	Arin Sime	2,857	7.80%
	Scattering	46	0.10%
Total votes		36,556	100.0%
Republican hold			

=== District 25 ===
District 25 election, 2007
Party	Candidate	Votes	%
Democratic	Creigh Deeds (incumbent)	33,339	98.80%
	Scattering	408	1.20%
Total votes		33,747	100.0%
Democratic hold			

=== District 26 ===
District 26 election, 2007
Party	Candidate	Votes	%
Republican	Mark Obenshain (incumbent)	25,955	70.40%
Democratic	Maxine Hope Roles	10,862	29.50%
	Scattering	47	0.10%
Total votes		36,864	100.0%
Republican hold			

=== District 27 ===
District 27 election, 2007
Party	Candidate	Votes	%
Republican	Jill Vogel	24,960	48.40%
Democratic	Karen Schultz	24,301	47.20%
Independent	Donald Marro	2,170	4.20%
	Scattering	90	0.20%
Total votes		51,521	100.0%
Republican hold			

=== District 28 ===
District 28 election, 2007
Party	Candidate	Votes	%
Republican	Richard Stuart	21,496	50.60%
Democratic	Albert C. Pollard	20,896	49.20%
	Scattering	74	0.20%
Total votes		42,466	100.0%
Republican hold			

=== District 29 ===
District 29 election, 2007
Party	Candidate	Votes	%
Democratic	Charles J. Colgan (incumbent)	21,010	54.10%
Republican	Robert Fitzsimmonds	17,766	45.80%
	Scattering	53	0.10%
Total votes		38,829	100.0%
Democratic hold			

=== District 30 ===
District 30 election, 2007
Party	Candidate	Votes	%
Democratic	Patsy Ticer (incumbent)	20,853	95.20%
	Scattering	1,051	4.80%
Total votes		21,904	100.0%
Democratic hold			

=== District 31 ===
District 31 election, 2007
Party	Candidate	Votes	%
Democratic	Mary Margaret Whipple (incumbent)	23,380	82.60%
Independent	Samuel Burley	4,676	16.50%
	Scattering	241	0.90%
Total votes		28,297	100.0%
Democratic hold			

=== District 32 ===
District 32 election, 2007
Party	Candidate	Votes	%
Democratic	Janet Howell (incumbent)	28,089	97.20%
	Scattering	818	2.80%
Total votes		28,907	100.0%
Democratic hold			

=== District 33 ===
District 33 election, 2007
Party	Candidate	Votes	%
Democratic	Mark Herring (incumbent)	27,784	56.90%
Republican	Patricia Phillips	20,994	43.00%
	Scattering	55	0.10%
Total votes		48,833	100.0%
Democratic hold			

=== District 34 ===
District 34 election, 2007
Party	Candidate	Votes	%
Democratic	Chap Petersen	25,513	55.30%
Republican	Jeannemarie Devolites Davis (incumbent)	20,490	44.40%
	Scattering	102	0.30%
Total votes		46,105	100.0%
Democratic gain from Republican			

=== District 35 ===
District 35 election, 2007
Party	Candidate	Votes	%
Democratic	Dick Saslaw (incumbent)	16,856	77.90%
Independent	Mario Palmiotto	4,532	21.00%
	Scattering	238	1.10%
Total votes		21,626	100.0%
Democratic hold			

=== District 36 ===
District 36 election, 2007
Party	Candidate	Votes	%
Democratic	Toddy Puller (incumbent)	21,441	96.30%
	Scattering	814	3.70%
Total votes		22,255	100.0%
Democratic hold			

=== District 37 ===
District 37 election, 2007
Party	Candidate	Votes	%
Republican	Ken Cuccinelli (incumbent)	18,602	50.00%
Democratic	Janet Oleszek	18,510	49.80%
	Scattering	73	0.20%
Total votes		37,185	100.0%
Republican hold			

=== District 38 ===
District 38 election, 2007
Party	Candidate	Votes	%
Democratic	Phillip Puckett (incumbent)	28,869	99.30%
	Scattering	191	0.70%
Total votes		29,060	100.0%
Democratic hold			

=== District 39 ===
District 39 election, 2007
Party	Candidate	Votes	%
Democratic	George Barker	19,892	50.90%
Republican	Jay O'Brien (incumbent)	19,131	49.00%
	Scattering	41	0.10%
Total votes		39,064	100.0%
Democratic gain from Republican			

=== District 40 ===
District 40 election, 2007
Party	Candidate	Votes	%
Republican	William C. Wampler Jr. (incumbent)	33,524	99.40%
	Scattering	214	0.60%
Total votes		33,738	100.0%
Republican hold			
