= 2007 Virginia elections =

- November 6, 2007

Virginia's 2007 state elections were held on November 6, 2007. Voters elected all 100 members of the Virginia House of Delegates to two-year terms ending in 2009, and all 40 members of the Virginia Senate to four-year terms ending in 2011. There were also elections for local offices (such as the Board of Supervisors and Clerk of the Circuit Court) in most counties. Occurring simultaneously were local elections in some counties.

In general, the Democrats emphasized transportation and the gridlock within the Republican-controlled Virginia General Assembly. The Democrats ran a statewide coordinated "21/51" campaign seeking to regain control of both the House and the Senate. The Republicans emphasized the need to take local actions against illegal immigration.

== State Senate ==
Previous to the election, Virginia's Senate consisted of 23 Republicans and 17 Democrats. Democrats defeated three incumbent Senators and won an open Republican seat to take control of the Senate by a 21 to 19 majority.

=== Election results ===
Party abbreviations: D - Democratic, R - Republican, I - Independent, IG - Independent Green, L - Libertarian

Note: Only Senate districts that were contested by more than one candidate are included here.

District	Incumbent	Party	Elected	Status	2007 result
1st	Marty Williams	Republican	1995	Defeated in primary	John Miller (D) 51.1% Tricia Stall (R) 48.6%
6th	Nick Rerras	Republican	1999	Defeated	Ralph Northam (D) 54.3% Nick Rerras (R) 45.5%
9th	Benjamin Lambert	Democratic	1985	Defeated in primary	A. Donald McEachin (D) 80.9% Silver Persinger (I) 18.3%
11th	Stephen Martin	Republican	1994	Reelected	Stephen Martin (R) 62.4% Alex McMurtrie, Jr. (D) 18.4% Roger Habeck (I) 14.7% Hank Cook (I) 4.3%
13th	Fred Quayle	Republican	1991	Reelected	Fred Quayle (R) 58.6% Steve Heretick (D) 41.1%
14th	Harry Blevins	Republican	2001	Reelected	Harry Blevins (R) 70.8% Donald Tabor Jr. (L) 28.8%
15th	Frank Ruff	Republican	1999	Reelected	Frank Ruff (R) 59.0% Bob Wilkerson (D) 40.9%
16th	Henry Marsh III	Democratic	1991	Reelected	Henry Marsh III (D) 66.6% Robert Owens (I) 33.1%
17th	Edd Houck	Democratic	1983	Reelected	Edd Houck (D) 56.0% Chris Yakabouski (R) 43.9%
19th	Charles Hawkins	Republican	1991	Retired	Robert Hurt (R) 75.7% Sherman Witcher (I) 24.2%
20th	Roscoe Reynolds	Democratic	1996	Reelected	Roscoe Reynolds (D) 63.0% Jeff Evans (R) 36.9%
22nd	J. Brandon Bell	Republican	1991	Defeated in primary	Ralph K. Smith (R) 50.8% Michael Breiner (D) 49.0%
24th	Emmett Hanger	Republican	1995	Reelected	Emmett Hanger (R) 65.4% David Cox (D) 26.7% Arin Sime (L) 7.8%
26th	Mark Obenshain	Republican	2003	Reelected	Mark Obenshain (R) 70.4% Maxine Hope Roles (D) 29.5%
27th	Russ Potts	Republican	1991	Retired	Jill Holtzman Vogel (R) 48.4% Karen Schultz (D) 47.2% Donald Marro (I) 4.2%
28th	John Chichester	Republican	1977	Retired	Richard Stuart (R) 50.6% Albert Pollard (D) 49.2%
29th	Chuck Colgan	Democratic	1975	Reelected	Chuck Colgan (D) 54.1% Robert FitzSimmonds (R) 45.8%
31st	Mary Margaret Whipple	Democratic	1995	Reelected	Mary Margaret Whipple (D) 82.6% Samuel Burley (IG) 16.5%
33rd	Mark Herring	Democratic	2006	Reelected	Mark Herring (D) 56.9% Patricia Phillips (R) 43.0%
34th	Jeannemarie Devolites-Davis	Republican	2003	Defeated	Chap Petersen (D) 55.3% Jeannemarie Devolites-Davis (R) 44.4%
35th	Dick Saslaw	Democratic	1980	Reelected	Dick Saslaw (D) 77.9% Mario Palmiotto (IG) 21.0%
37th	Ken Cuccinelli	Republican	2001	Reelected	Ken Cuccinelli (R) 50.0% Janet Oleszek (D) 49.8%
39th	Jay O'Brien	Republican	2002	Defeated	George Barker (D) 50.9% Jay O'Brien (R) 49.0%

== House of Delegates ==
Before the election, Republicans controlled the House of Delegates with 57 seats, compared to the Democrats' 40 seats, and three seats held by Independents. Democrats won four seats from the Republicans, defeating one incumbent and taking three open seats, while one Republican defeated an incumbent Independent, making the post-election composition of the House 54 Republicans, 44 Democrats, and 2 Independents.
