= Electoral history of Bobby Scott =

American political record

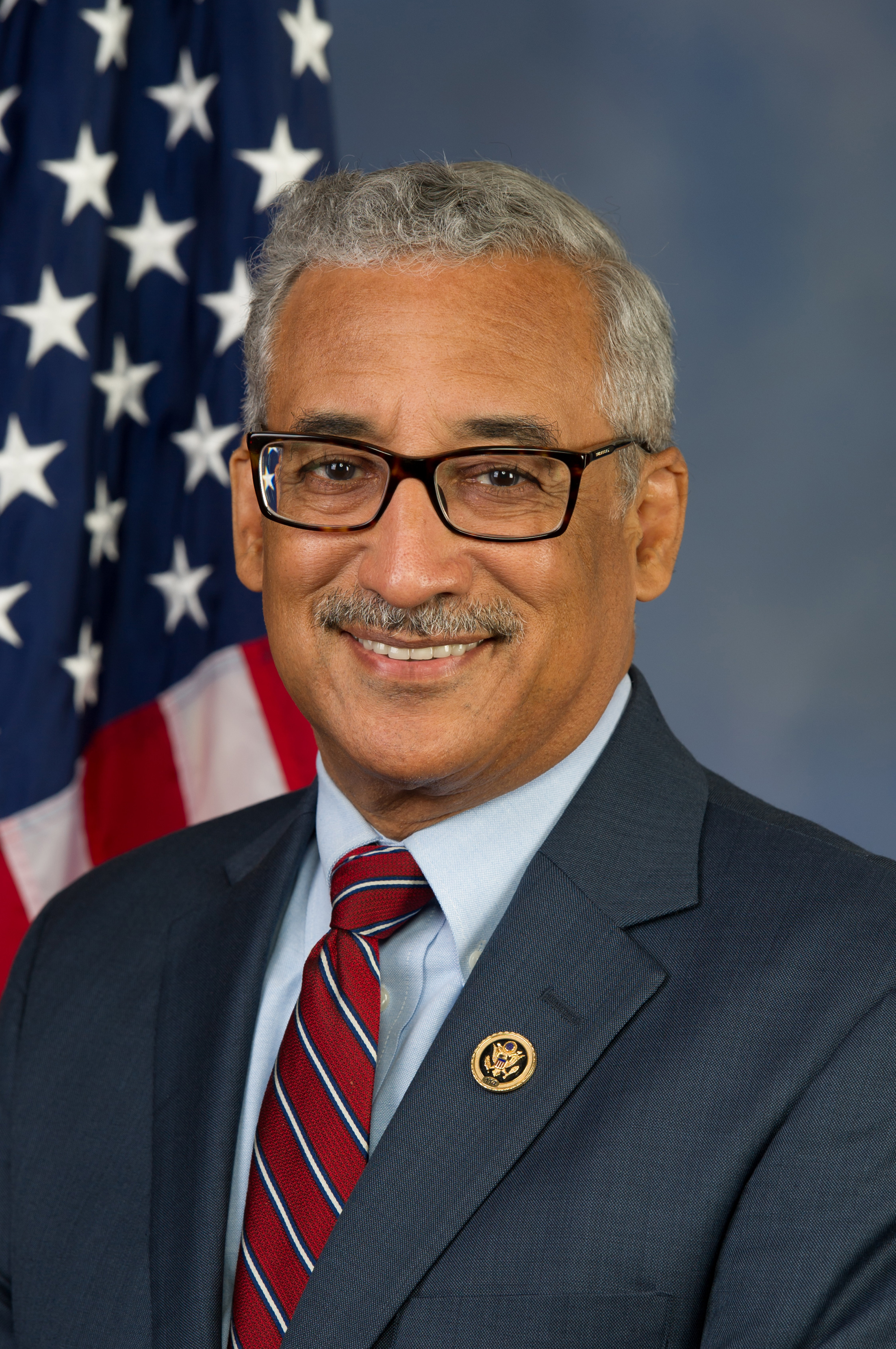

Bobby Scott is an American politician from Virginia who is currently serving in the U.S. House of Representatives since 1993. Prior to his term in the House of Representatives, he served in both houses of the Virginia General Assembly. He served in the Virginia House of Delegates from 1978 to 1983, and the Virginia Senate from 1983 to 1993. During his term in the Virginia Senate, Scott unsuccessfully ran for Virginia's 1st congressional district in 1986.

== Virginia House of Delegates ==
1977 Virginia House of Delegates 49th district election
Primary election
Party	Candidate	Votes	%
Democratic	Bobby Scott	11,389	29.3
Democratic	Alan Diamonstein (incumbent)	9,736	25.1
Democratic	Theodore V. Morrison, Jr. (incumbent)	9,131	23.5
Democratic	Lewis A. McMurran, Jr.	8,572	22.1
Total votes		38,828	100.0
General election
Democratic	Alan Diamonstein (incumbent)	20,624	29.2
Democratic	Theodore V. Morrison, Jr. (incumbent)	20,326	28.8
Democratic	Bobby Scott	19,635	27.8
Independent	Mary B. McClaine	9,935	14.1
Write-in		5	0.0
Total votes		70,525	100.0

1979 Virginia House of Delegates 49th district election
Party	Candidate	Votes	%
Democratic	Theodore V. Morrison, Jr. (incumbent)	18,222	28.1
Democratic	Alan Diamonstein (incumbent)	17,988	27.7
Democratic	Bobby Scott (incumbent)	15,412	23.8
Republican	David L. Short	11,562	17.8
Independent	M. E. Simerly	1,675	2.6
Total votes		64,859	100.0

1981 Virginia House of Delegates 49th district election
Party	Candidate	Votes	%
Democratic	Theodore V. Morrison, Jr. (incumbent)	24,010	32.4
Democratic	Alan Diamonstein (incumbent)	23,706	32.0
Democratic	Bobby Scott (incumbent)	21,727	29.3
Independent	Johnnie L. Hall	4,663	6.3
Write-in		17	0.0
Total votes		74,123	100.0

== Virginia Senate ==
1982 Virginia Senate 2nd district special election
Party	Candidate	Votes	%
Democratic	Bobby Scott	11,006	50.3
Republican	William F. Haskins, Jr.	10,864	49.7
Write-in		1	0.0
Total votes		21,871	100.0
Democratic gain from Republican			

1983 Virginia Senate 2nd district election
Party	Candidate	Votes	%
Democratic	Bobby Scott (incumbent)	17,714	54.2
Republican	William F. Haskins, Jr.	14,968	45.8
Write-in		1	0.0
Total votes		32,683	100.0
Democratic hold			

1987 Virginia Senate 2nd district election
Party	Candidate	Votes	%
Democratic	Bobby Scott (incumbent)	21,519	57.3
Republican	Teddy R. Marks	16,006	42.7
Write-in		3	0.0
Total votes		37,528	100.0
Democratic hold			

1991 Virginia Senate 2nd district election
Party	Candidate	Votes	%
Democratic	Bobby Scott (incumbent)	14,226	99.7
Write-in		47	0.3
Total votes		14,273	100.0
Democratic hold			

== U.S. House ==
=== 1980's ===
1986 Virginia's 1st congressional district election
Party	Candidate	Votes	%
Republican	Herb Bateman (incumbent)	80,713	56.0
Democratic	Bobby Scott	63,364	44.0
Write-in		9	0.0
Total votes		144,086	100.0
Republican hold			

=== 1990's ===
1992 Virginia's 3rd congressional district election
Party	Candidate	Votes	%
Democratic	Bobby Scott	23,381	67.0
Democratic	Jean Wooden Cunningham	7,520	21.5
Democratic	Jacqueline G. Epps	4,003	11.5
Total votes		34,904	100.0
General election
Democratic	Bobby Scott	132,432	78.6
Republican	Daniel Jenkins	35,780	21.2
Write-in		261	0.2
Total votes		168,473	100.0
Democratic gain from Republican			

1994 Virginia's 3rd congressional district election
Party	Candidate	Votes	%
Democratic	Bobby Scott (incumbent)	108,532	79.4
Republican	Thomas "Tom" E. Ward	28,080	20.6
Write-in		8	0.0
Total votes		136,620	100.0
Democratic hold			

1996 Virginia's 3rd congressional district election
Party	Candidate	Votes	%
Democratic	Bobby Scott (incumbent)	118,603	82.1
Republican	E. G. Holland	25,781	17.9
Write-in		34	0.0
Total votes		144,418	100.0
Democratic hold			

1998 Virginia's 3rd congressional district election
Party	Candidate	Votes	%
Democratic	Bobby Scott (incumbent)	48,129	75.9
Independent	R. S. Barnett	14,453	22.8
Write-in		772	1.2
Total votes		63,374	100.0
Democratic hold			

=== 2000's ===
2000 Virginia's 3rd congressional district election
Party	Candidate	Votes	%
Democratic	Bobby Scott (incumbent)	137,527	97.7
Write-in		3,226	2.3
Total votes		140,753	100.0
Democratic hold			

2002 Virginia's 3rd congressional district election
Party	Candidate	Votes	%
Democratic	Bobby Scott (incumbent)	87,521	96.1
Write-in		3,552	3.9
Total votes		91,073	100.0
Democratic hold			

2004 Virginia's 3rd congressional district election
Party	Candidate	Votes	%
Democratic	Bobby Scott (incumbent)	159,373	69.3
Republican	Winsome Earle-Sears	70,194	30.5
Write-in		325	0.1
Total votes		229,892	100.0
Democratic hold			

2006 Virginia's 3rd congressional district election
Party	Candidate	Votes	%
Democratic	Bobby Scott (incumbent)	133,546	96.1
Write-in		5,448	3.9
Total votes		138,994	100.0
Democratic hold			

2008 Virginia's 3rd congressional district election
Party	Candidate	Votes	%
Democratic	Bobby Scott (incumbent)	239,911	97.0
Write-in		7,377	3.0
Total votes		247,288	100.0
Democratic hold			

=== 2010's ===
2010 Virginia's 3rd congressional district election
Party	Candidate	Votes	%
Democratic	Bobby Scott (incumbent)	102,470	68.7
Republican	C. L. Chuck Smith, Jr.	42,297	28.4
Libertarian	James J. Quigley	2,205	1.5
Independent	John D. Kelly	1,927	1.3
Write-in		159	0.1
Total votes		149,058	100.0
Democratic hold			

2012 Virginia's 3rd congressional district election
Party	Candidate	Votes	%
Democratic	Bobby Scott (incumbent)	259,199	81.2
Republican	Dean J. Longo	58,931	18.5
Write-in		1,236	0.4
Total votes		319,366	100.0
Democratic hold			

2014 Virginia's 3rd congressional district election
Party	Candidate	Votes	%
Democratic	Bobby Scott (incumbent)	139,197	94.4
Write-in		8,206	5.6
Total votes		147,403	100.0
Democratic hold			

2016 Virginia's 3rd congressional district election
Party	Candidate	Votes	%
Democratic	Bobby Scott (incumbent)	208,337	66.7
Republican	Martin L. Williams	103,289	33.1
Write-in		745	0.2
Total votes		312,371	100.0
Democratic hold			

2018 Virginia's 3rd congressional district election
Party	Candidate	Votes	%
Democratic	Bobby Scott (incumbent)	198,615	91.2
Write-in		19,177	8.8
Total votes		217,792	100.0
Democratic hold			

=== 2020's ===
2020 Virginia's 3rd congressional district election
Party	Candidate	Votes	%
Democratic	Bobby Scott (incumbent)	233,326	68.4
Republican	John Collick, Jr.	107,299	31.4
Write-in		736	0.2
Total votes		341,361	100.0
Democratic hold			

2022 Virginia's 3rd congressional district election
Party	Candidate	Votes	%
Democratic	Bobby Scott (incumbent)	139,659	67.2
Republican	Terry T. Namkung	67,668	32.6
Write-in		516	0.2
Total votes		207,843	100.0
Democratic hold			

2024 Virginia's 3rd congressional district election
Party	Candidate	Votes	%
Democratic	Bobby Scott (incumbent)	219,926	70.0
Republican	John Sitka, III	93,801	29.8
Write-in		670	0.2
Total votes		314,397	100.0
Democratic hold			
