= 1979 Virginia Senate election =

1979 Virginia Senate elections
- November 6, 1979

All 40 seats in the Senate of Virginia 21 seats needed for a majority
- Turnout: 51.65%
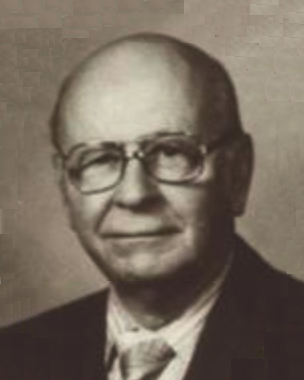

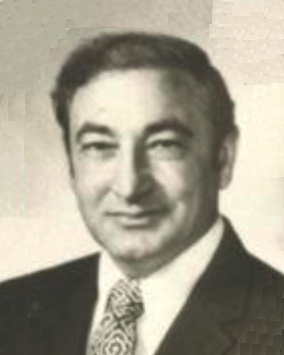
| | Majority party | Minority party |
|---|---|---|
| Leader | Abe Brault | William A. Truban |
| Party | Democratic | Republican |
| Leader since | January 14, 1976 | January 14, 1976 |
| Leader's seat | 34th | 27th |
| Last election | 35 seats, 69.6% | 5 seats, 26.2% |
| Seats won | 30 | 10 |
| Seat change | ▼5 | ▲5 |
| Popular vote | 625,023 | 346,137 |
| Percentage | 63.5% | 35.2% |
| Swing | ▼6.1 pp | ▲9.0 pp |
Majority leader before election
Abe Brault
Democratic
Elected Majority leader
Hunter Andrews
Democratic

The 1979 Virginia Senate elections were held on November 6, 1979, alongside the Virginia House of Delegates election. All 40 seats in the Senate of Virginia were up for election.

== Overall results ==
↓
| 30 | 10 |
| Democratic | Republican |

| Parties | | Seats | | | | Popular Vote | | |
| Parties | | 1975 | 1979 | +/- | Strength | Vote | % | Change |
|---|---|---|---|---|---|---|---|---|
| | Democratic | 35 | 30 | ▼5 | 75.00% | 625,023 | 63.53% | ▼6.09% |
| | Republican | 5 | 10 | ▲5 | 25.00% | 346,137 | 35.18% | ▲8.99% |
| | Independent | 0 | 0 | Steady | 0.00% | 11,988 | 1.22% | ▼2.95% |
| - | Write-ins | 0 | 0 | Steady | 0.00% | 680 | 0.07% | ▲0.04% |
| Total | | 40 | 40 | 0 | 100.00% | 983,828 | 100.00% | - |

== See also ==
- United States elections, 1979
- Virginia elections, 1979
  - Virginia House of Delegates election, 1979
