= Emilie F. Miller =

American politician

Emilie Miller
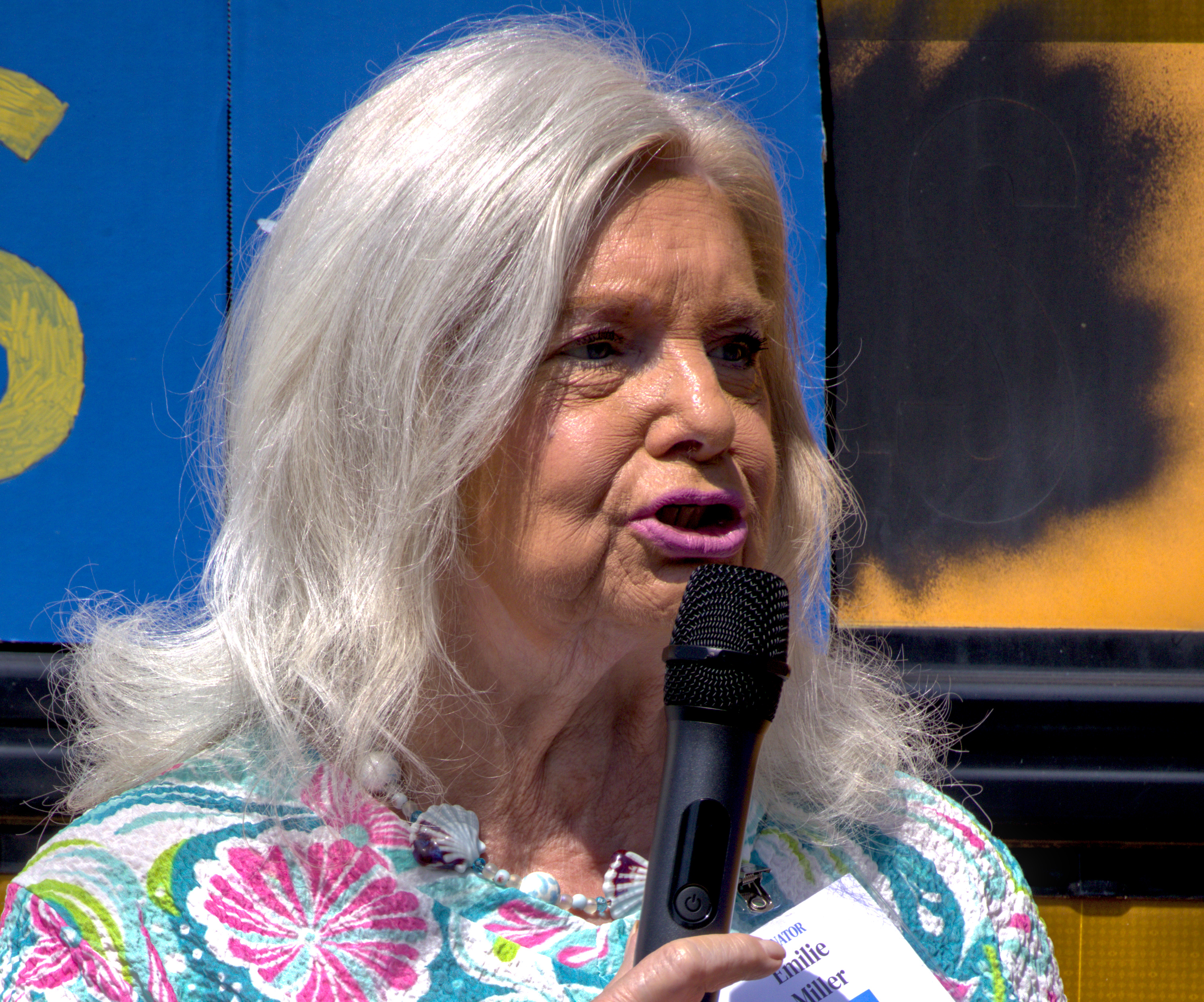
- Emilie Miller in 2025

Member of the Virginia Senate from the 34th district
- In office January 13, 1988 – January 8, 1992
- Preceded by: John Russell
- Succeeded by: Jane Woods

Personal details
- Born: Emilie Marie Feiza; August 11, 1936 (age 90) Chicago, Illinois, U.S.
- Party: Democratic
- Spouse: Dean Edward Miller
- Education: Drake University (BSBA)

Emilie Feiza Miller (born August 11, 1936) is an American politician who served as a Democratic member of the Virginia Senate. A legislative aide to Senator Abe Brault, she ran for his seat with his endorsement when he retired in 1983 but lost to Fairfax mayor John W. Russell. She defeated him in a rematch four years later. While in the Senate, she championed the admission of women to Virginia Military Institute. She was defeated for reelection in 1991 by Delegate Jane Woods.
