= John Russell (Virginia politician) =

Virginian politician (1923–2012)

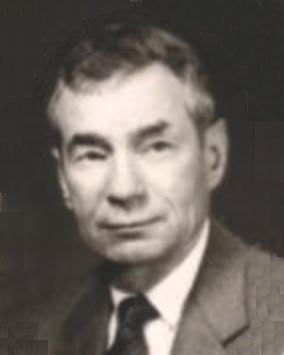

Member of the Virginia Senate from the 34th district
- In office January 11, 1984 – January 13, 1988
- Preceded by: Abe Brault
- Succeeded by: Emilie Miller

Mayor of Fairfax, Virginia
- In office 1982–1983
- Preceded by: Frederick Silverthorne
- Succeeded by: George Snyder
- In office 1970–1974
- Preceded by: George Hamill
- Succeeded by: Nathaniel Young

Personal details
- Born: John Wesley Russell; August 31, 1923 Williamson, Illinois, U.S.
- Died: December 24, 2012 (aged 89) Fairfax, Virginia, U.S.
- Party: Republican
- Spouse: Ruth Marie Boyce
- Education: Southern Illinois Normal University (AB); University of Illinois (MA, PhD)

John Wesley Russell (August 31, 1923 – December 24, 2012) was an American Republican politician who served two terms as mayor of Fairfax, Virginia, in the Fairfax City Council and one term in the Virginia Senate. He defeated legislative aide Emilie F. Miller to succeed her boss, Senator Abe Brault, in 1983, but he lost the seat in a rematch four years later.
