= Virginia's 15th Senate district =

American legislative district

Virginia's 15th State Senate district
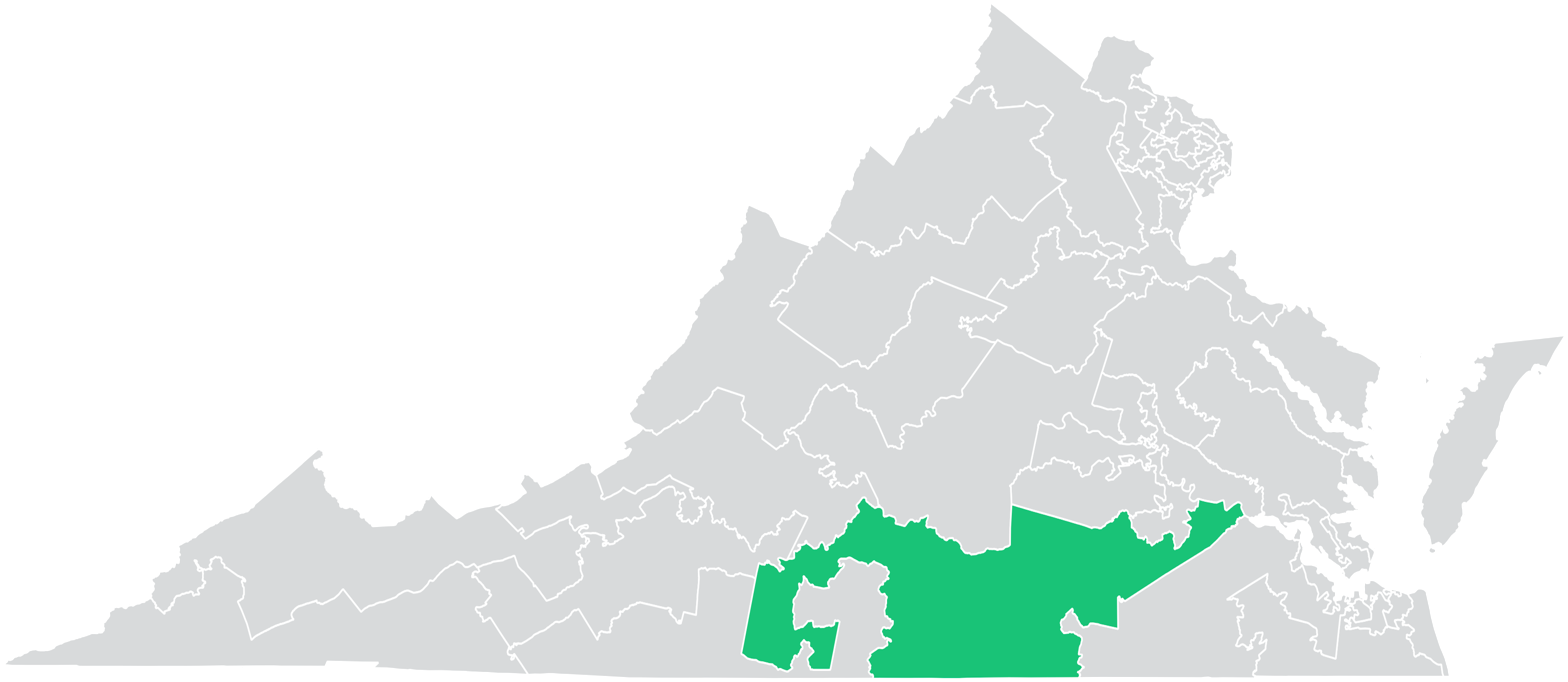
Senator
Mike Jones; D–Richmond
- Demographics: 67% White; 27% Black; 3% Hispanic; 1% Asian; 2% Other
- Population (2019): 191,250
- Registered voters: 133,523

Virginia's 15th Senate district is one of 40 districts in the Senate of Virginia. It has been represented by Democrat Mike Jones since 2026.

== Geography ==
District 15 was a sprawling district based in Virginia's Southside, and included all of Charlotte, Lunenburg, Mecklenburg, and Nottoway Counties, as well as parts of Brunswick, Campbell, Dinwiddie, Halifax, Pittsylvania, and Prince George Counties and part of the city of Danville. At over 4,200 square miles, District 15 was the largest Senate district in Virginia. It bordered the state of North Carolina. Now, after the 2023 redistricting, it is a much smaller district located in central Virginia, covering portions of Chesterfield County and Richmond City.

The district is located entirely within Virginia's 5th congressional district, and overlaps the 74th, 75th, 76th, 77th, 79th, and 81st districts of the Virginia House of Delegates.

== Recent election results ==
=== 2023 ===
2023 Virginia Senate election, District 15
Party	Candidate	Votes	%
Democratic	Ghazala Hashmi	33,253	62.2
Republican	Hayden Fisher	20,042	37.5
Write-in	Miscellaneous	202	0.4
Total votes		53,497	100
Democratic gain from Republican			

Elections prior to 2023 were held under different boundaries.

=== 2019 ===
2019 Virginia Senate election, District 15
Primary election
Party	Candidate	Votes	%
Republican	Frank Ruff (incumbent)	8,235	79.4
Republican	Dale Sturdifen	2,132	20.6
Total votes		10,368	100
General election
Republican	Frank Ruff (incumbent)	38,471	68.3
Democratic	Virginia Smith	17,793	31.6
Total votes		56,327	100
Republican hold			

=== 2015 ===
2015 Virginia Senate election, District 15
Party	Candidate	Votes	%
Republican	Frank Ruff (incumbent)	32,745	98.3
Total votes		33,317	100
Republican hold			

=== 2011 ===
2011 Virginia Senate election, District 15
Party	Candidate	Votes	%
Republican	Frank Ruff (incumbent)	36,193	99.2
Total votes		36,474	100
Republican hold			

=== Federal and statewide results ===
Year	Office	Results
2020	President	Trump 64.6–33.6%
2017	Governor	Gillespie 65.3–34.0%
2016	President	Trump 63.1–34.4%
2014	Senate	Gillespie 59.6–38.7%
2013	Governor	Cuccinelli 59.3–34.4%
2012	President	Romney 58.9–39.8%
2012	Senate	Allen 60.1–39.9%

== Historical results ==
All election results below took place prior to 2011 redistricting, and thus were under different district lines.

=== 2007 ===
2007 Virginia Senate election, District 15
Party	Candidate	Votes	%
Republican	Frank Ruff (incumbent)	25,429	59.0
Democratic	Bob Wilkerson	17,658	40.9
Total votes		43,124	100
Republican hold			

=== 2003 ===
2003 Virginia Senate election, District 15
Party	Candidate	Votes	%
Republican	Frank Ruff (incumbent)	27,288	99.8
Total votes		27,338	100
Republican hold			

=== 2000 special ===
2000 Virginia Senate special election, District 15
Party	Candidate	Votes	%
Republican	Frank Ruff	30,395	51.1
Democratic	Jerry Flowers	28,235	47.5
Independent	Amos Neill	826	1.4
Total votes		59,477	100
Republican gain from Democratic			

=== 1999 ===
1999 Virginia Senate election, District 15
Party	Candidate	Votes	%
Democratic	Richard J. Holland (incumbent)	21,783	53.7
Republican	Thomas C. Wright	18,769	46.3
Total votes		40,560	100
Democratic hold			

=== 1995 ===
1995 Virginia Senate election, District 15
Party	Candidate	Votes	%
Democratic	Richard J. Holland (incumbent)	21,609	53.3
Republican	Jerry Flowers	18,921	46.7
Total votes		40,533	100
Democratic hold			

=== 1991 ===
1991 Virginia Senate election, District 15
Party	Candidate	Votes	%
Democratic	Richard J. Holland (incumbent)	23,519	100
Total votes		23,519	100
Democratic hold			

=== 1987 ===
1987 Virginia Senate election, District 15
Party	Candidate	Votes	%
Democratic	Richard J. Holland (incumbent)	22,044	100
Total votes		22,044	100
Democratic hold			

=== 1983 ===
1983 Virginia Senate election, District 15
Party	Candidate	Votes	%
Democratic	Richard J. Holland (incumbent)	22,267	100
Total votes		22,267	100
Democratic hold			

=== 1979 ===
1979 Virginia Senate election, District 15
Party	Candidate	Votes	%
Democratic	Richard J. Holland	15,673	100
Total votes		15,673	100
Democratic gain from Independent			

=== 1976 - Special ===
1976 Virginia Senate District 15 Special election
Party	Candidate	Votes	%
Independent	John Lewis Rawls Jr.	10,990	48.9
Independent	Moses A. Riddick Jr.	7,086	31.5
Independent	Gilbert W. Francis	4,408	19.6
Total votes		22,484	100
Independent gain from Democratic			

=== 1975 ===
1975 Virginia Senate election, District 15
Party	Candidate	Votes	%
Democratic	William V. Rawlings (incumbent)	13,609	100
Total votes		13,609	100
Democratic hold			

=== 1971 ===
1971 Virginia Senate election, District 15
Party	Candidate	Votes	%
Democratic	William V. Rawlings	20,650	100
Total votes		20,650	100
Democratic hold			

=== 1967 ===
1967 Virginia Senate election, District 15
Party	Candidate	Votes	%
Democratic	Macon M. Long (incumbent)	15,631	50.8
Independent	Kline R. Powers	15,125	49.2
Total votes		30,756	100
Democratic hold			

=== 1965 ===
1965 Virginia Senate election, District 15
Party	Candidate	Votes	%
Democratic	Macon M. Long	7,671	100
Total votes		7,671	100
Democratic hold			

=== 1963 ===
1963 Virginia Senate election, District 15
Party	Candidate	Votes	%
Democratic	George M. Warren Jr.	5,977	100
Total votes		5,977	100
Democratic hold			

=== 1959 ===
1959 Virginia Senate election, District 15
Party	Candidate	Votes	%
Democratic	Thomas C. Phillips Jr. (incumbent)	10,503	100
Total votes		10,503	100
Democratic hold			

=== 1957 - Special ===
1957 Virginia Senate district 15 Special election
Party	Candidate	Votes	%
Democratic	Thomas C. Phillips Jr.	6,929	52.3
Republican	Ralph L. Lincoln	6,324	47.7
Total votes		13,253	100
Democratic hold			

=== 1955 ===
1955 Virginia Senate election, District 15
Party	Candidate	Votes	%
Democratic	George M. Warren (incumbent)	9,923	100
Total votes		9,923	100
Democratic hold			

=== 1951 ===
1951 Virginia Senate election, District 15
Party	Candidate	Votes	%
Democratic	George M. Warren (incumbent)	9,422	100
Total votes		9,422	100
Democratic hold			

=== 1947 ===
1947 Virginia Senate election, District 15
Party	Candidate	Votes	%
Democratic	George M. Warren	6,744	55
Republican	Homer McFaddin	5,528	45
Total votes		12,272	100
Democratic hold			
