= Senator Newton =

Senator Newton may refer to:

- Blake T. Newton (1889–1977), Virginia State Senate
- Buck Newton (born 1968), North Carolina State Senate
- Charles D. Newton (1861–1930), New York State Senate
- Cherubusco Newton (1848–1910), Louisiana State Senate
- Eben Newton (1795–1885), Ohio State Senate
- Ernie Newton (politician) (born 1956), Connecticut State Senate
- Paul Newton (politician) (born 1960), North Carolina State Senate
- Reuben Newton (1902–1964), Alabama State Senate
- Thomas Willoughby Newton (1804–1853), Arkansas State Senate
