= John W. Russell =

John W. Russell may refer to:

- John Russell (horse trainer)
- John W. Russell (New York politician)
- John Russell (Virginia politician)
- John W. Russell Jr., American politician from Oklahoma
- John Wentworth Russell (1879–1959), Canadian painter

== See also ==
- John Russell (disambiguation)
