= 1975 Virginia Senate election =

1975 Virginia Senate elections
- November 4, 1975

All 40 seats in the Senate of Virginia 21 seats needed for a majority
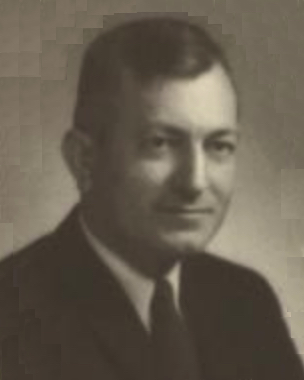

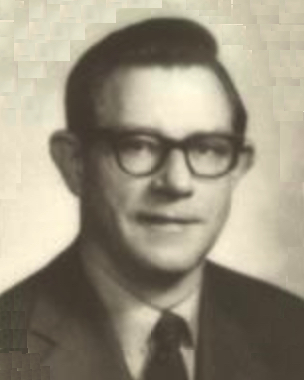
	Majority party	Minority party
Leader	William B. Hopkins	Robert S. Burruss Jr.
Party	Democratic	Republican
Leader since	January 4, 1972	November 21, 1972
Leader's seat	21st	23rd
Last election	34 seats, 64.5%	6 seats, 31.6%
Seats won	35	5
Seat change	▲1	▼1
Popular vote	588,993	221,545
Percentage	69.6%	26.2%
Swing	▲5.1 pp	▼5.4 pp
Majority leader before election
William B. Hopkins
Democratic
Elected Majority leader
Abe Brault
Democratic

The 1975 Virginia Senate elections were held on November 4, 1975, alongside the Virginia House of Delegates election. All 40 seats in the Senate of Virginia were up for election.

== Overall results ==
↓
35	5
Democratic	Republican

Parties		Seats				Popular Vote		
Parties		1971	1975	+/-	Strength	Vote	%	Change
	Democratic	34	35	▲1	87.50%	588,993	69.62%	▲5.17%
	Republican	6	5	▼1	13.50%	221,545	26.19%	▼5.45%
	Independent	0	0	Steady	0.00%	35,283	4.17%	▲0.29%
-	Write-ins	0	0	Steady	0.00%	240	0.03%	▲0.01%
Total		40	40	0	100.00%	846,061	100.00%	-

== See also ==
- Virginia elections
  - Virginia House of Delegates election, 1975
