= 1987 Virginia House of Delegates election =

Virginia House of Delegates election, 1987
- November 3, 1987

All 100 seats in the Virginia House of Delegates 51 seats needed for a majority
- Turnout: 59.1% ▲
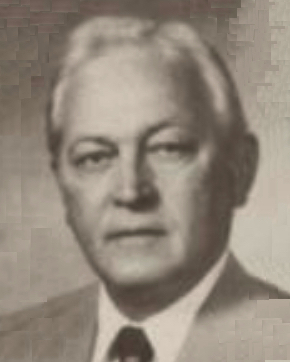

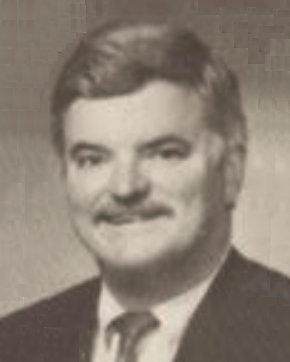
	Majority party	Minority party
Leader	A. L. Philpott	Andy Guest
Party	Democratic	Republican
Leader since	January 9, 1980	December 3, 1985
Leader's seat	11th	31st
Last election	65	33
Seats won	64	35
Seat change	▼1	▲2
Popular vote	709,525	497,506
Percentage	56.9%	39.9%
Swing	▼1.4%	▲0.4%
- Results: Republican hold Republican gain Democratic hold Democratic gain Independent hold
Speaker before election
A. L. Philpott
Democratic
Elected Speaker
A. L. Philpott
Democratic

The Virginia House of Delegates election of 1987 was held on Tuesday, November 3. Primary elections were held on June 9, 1987.

== Results ==
=== Overview ===
↓
64	35	1
Democratic	Republican

Parties		Candidates	Seats				Popular Vote		
Parties		Candidates	1985	1987	+/-	Strength	Vote	%	Change
	Democratic	77	65	64	▼1	64.00%	709,525	56.93%	
	Republican	53	33	35	▲2	35.00%	497,506	39.92%	
	Independent	9	2	1	▼1	1.00%	38,559	3.09%	
-	Write-ins	-	0	0	Steady	0.00%	770	0.06%	
Total		139	100	100	0	100.00%	1,246,360	100.00%	-

== See also ==
- 1987 United States elections
- 1987 Virginia elections
  - 1987 Virginia Senate election
