= Abe Brault =

American politician

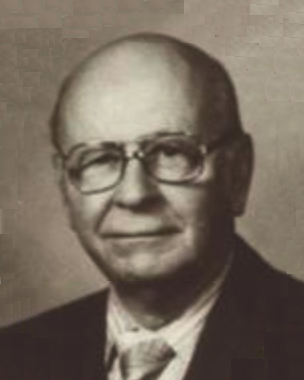

Member of the Virginia Senate
- In office January 12, 1966 – January 11, 1984 Serving with Omer L. Hirst until 1972
- Preceded by: Robert C. Fitzgerald
- Succeeded by: John Russell
- Constituency: 24th district (1966‍–‍1972); 34th district (1972‍–‍1984)

Personal details
- Born: Adelard Lionel Brault; April 6, 1909 Winsted, Connecticut, U.S.
- Died: February 13, 2007 (aged 97) Front Royal, Virginia, U.S.
- Party: Democratic
- Spouse: Clarice Louise Covington (m. 1937)
- Education: Columbus School of Law

Military service
- Branch/service: United States Navy
- Rank: Lieutenant
- Battles/wars: World War II

Adelard Lionel "Abe" Brault (April 6, 1909 – February 13, 2007) was an American lawyer, naval veteran and Democratic politician who served multiple terms in the Virginia Senate.

== Early and family life ==
Born in Winsted, Connecticut, he was raised in Washington, D.C., graduating from Gonzaga High School in 1927, and then Columbus School of Law, affiliated with American University in 1933, during the Great Depression. Brault served in the U.S. Navy in the North Atlantic during World War II.

== Career ==
After his military service, Brault settled in Fairfax, Virginia, and represented insurance companies in his legal practice. He became active in the Democratic Party as well as the local bar association and was president of the Fairfax Bar Association when appointed to the Fairfax County Board of Supervisors in 1962. In 1965 Brault won election to the Virginia Senate, so that he and Omer Hirst both represented Fairfax County in the (multi-member) 24th senatorial district, and both were re-elected in 1967 and John N. Beall Jr. also added to the Fairfax county delegation following court decisions which required Virginia districts to represent roughly equal number of voters (contrary to the Byrd Organization redistrictings which led to under-representation in the growing northern Virginia suburbs of northern Virginia). Brault continued to win re-election, although the creation of single member districts for the 1971 election changed the number of his district to the 34th and he faced Republican opponents.

Fellow Democratic state senators elected Brault as their majority leader in 1976, but he only held that position for four years, succeeded by fellow (but more conservative) Democrat Hunter Andrews of the state's Hampton Roads region in 1980. Although sometimes at odds with fellow Fairfax Democrat Clive DuVal, Brault cooperated extensively with fellow state senator Omer Hirst to construct the Dulles Toll Road, which was completed in 1984 and officially renamed to honor both men in 1991 (although the lengthy name never became popular among commuters). However, his state senate seat was captured by Republican John W. Russell in 1985, as he narrowly defeated Democrat Emilie F. Miller, who then narrowly defeated him in 1987. Though Brault expected to move to Florida after announcing his pending retirement in 1983, he remained near his family in Virginia, and Governor Chuck Robb appointed him to the State Board of Education.

Brault died in 2007 and is buried at Arlington National Cemetery.

Senate of Virginia
Preceded by William B. Hopkins	Senate Majority Leader; 1976–1980	Succeeded by Hunter Andrews
