= John Miller (Virginia politician) =

American politician

Member of the Virginia Senate from the 1st district
- In office January 9, 2008 – April 4, 2016
- Preceded by: Marty Williams
- Succeeded by: Monty Mason

Personal details
- Born: December 9, 1947 Bryn Mawr, Pennsylvania
- Died: April 4, 2016 (aged 68) Newport News, Virginia
- Party: Democratic
- Spouse: Sharron Kitchen Miller
- Education: Northern Illinois Univ. (BA)
- Profession: Journalist; educator
- Website: www.senatorjohnmiller.com

John C. Miller (December 9, 1947 – April 4, 2016) was an American journalist and politician. A Democrat, he was elected to the Senate of Virginia in 2007, won re-election twice by increasing majorities, and died during his final term. He represented the 1st district on the Virginia Peninsula, which comprises the city of Williamsburg, parts of the city of Suffolk, parts of York County, James City County and the cities of Hampton and Newport News.

== Early and family life ==
Born in Bryn Mawr, Pennsylvania on December 9. 1947, Miller graduated from Northern Illinois University with a bachelor's degree. He married and had a daughter and son.

== Career ==
Miller worked as a reporter and later was the anchorman at WVEC-TV for 18 years. At WVEC, he became well known for treating those he interviewed with the same high level of deference, whether they were a school janitor or the Governor of the Commonwealth of Virginia. After leaving Channel 13, he served as Director of Community Outreach for Orion Air. Previously, Miller worked for U.S. Senator Paul Trible (a Republican), at Christopher Newport University and public broadcasting station WHRO. He was also active in many community organizations, including Smart Beginnings of the Virginia Peninsula, People to People, and Peninsula READS, among other organizations.

First elected to the Virginia Senate in 2007, John Miller was so widely liked by citizens from a both Democratic and Republican factions that he was able to win a seat previously considered to be easily controlled by the Republicans. He later won re-election in 2011 and 2015. In his last session Miller shepherded a major high school education reform bill to passage. In the Virginia Senate, Miller helped establish a bipartisan coalition known as the Commonwealth Caucus, especially to work on issues related to redistricting and education reform. Miller also worked to protect the Chesapeake Bay, military families and to end childhood obesity.

== Death and legacy ==
Miller was found dead in his home, of an apparent heart attack on April 4, 2016. He was survived by his wife, son, daughter and grandchildren. Two governors, as well as many other dignitaries, were among the hundreds of mourners at his funeral at First Baptist Church Denbigh. John Miller was among the now-vanishing breed of political leaders in Virginia politics who cheerfully worked with both Democrats and Republicans in the Virginia Senate and in the House of Delegates to help improve the lives of his fellow Virginians.
