= Blake T. Newton =

American politician (1889–1977)

Member of the Virginia Senate from the 29th district
- In office January 11, 1956 – January 12, 1966
- Preceded by: Robert O. Norris Jr.
- Succeeded by: Leslie D. Campbell Jr.

Personal details
- Born: October 21, 1889 Hague, Virginia, U.S.
- Died: April 30, 1977 (aged 87) Richmond, Virginia, U.S.
- Party: Democratic
- Spouse: Bertha Effingham Lawrence
- Children: Edward C. Newton, Blake T. Newton, Jr., Bertha E.L. Newton Davison
- Education: College of William and Mary

Blake Tyler Newton (October 21, 1889 – April 30, 1977) was a Virginia lawyer, educator and Democratic member of the Senate of Virginia from Hague, Virginia. During the state's Massive Resistance crisis, Newton opposed public school closings, so that when his term expired, he was replaced on the State Board of Education by State Senator Garland Gray, who helped lead the Byrd Organization's opposition to racial desegregation of public schools after the U.S. Supreme Court's decisions in Brown v. Board of Education.

== Early life and career ==
A native and lifelong resident of Virginia's Northern Neck, Newton was born on October 21, 1889, to Edward C. Newton and his wife Lucy Yates Tyler, the next to last of their four sons and two daughters. He attended segregated public schools, and then received bachelor's and master's degrees from the College of William and Mary. In 1956, he received his alma mater's highest alumni award for loyalty and service.

He married Bertha Effingham Lawrence on July 29, 1913.

== Career ==
In 1910, Newton began his teaching career at Hamilton High School. He first leadership position was as in the foothills of the Shenandoah Valley, where in 1912-1913 Newton served as principal of the Blue Ridge Industrial School in Greene County, Virginia. That relatively new vocational mostly boarding school established by Archdeacon Frederick Neve taught children of both sexes from the mountain schools and mission churches in nine counties on both sides of the Appalachian Mountains. There Newton met his wife, a teacher at the school, and she joined him in moving back to the Northern Neck when he accepted the position of school superintendent for Richmond and Westmoreland Counties beginning in the fall of 1913. Over the next 41 years, Newton replaced 30 one-room schoolhouses (often without plumbing and modern heating) with centralized modern public schools, as well as established a school bus transportation system so students could attend those facilities, which were often outside walking distance.

Newton was active in historic Cople Parish as well as the larger Episcopal Church, as well as the Ruritans, Sons of the American Revolution, Phi Kappa Alpha, Phi Delta Kappa, Phi Beta Kappa, the Northern Neck Bar Association and the Northern Neck Historical Society. Beginning in 1928, he served on the Virginia State Central Democratic Committee.

In 1937, Virginia's General Assembly elected Newton to serve on Virginia's State Board of Education. In 1946, legislators elected him to preside over that body; his 10-year term began the following January. Meanwhile, in 1942, the General Assembly published his "Governor of Virginia as Business Manager."

In 1955, as the Massive Resistance crisis escalated, Newton ran for and was elected (unopposed) to the State Senate from the 29th district. Although unopposed in the general election, he had fierce opposition from the Byrd forces in the Democratic Party primary. Robert O. Norris, Jr. had held the seat since 1946, which had been numbered the 30th district during the previous decade. The Washington Post editorialized that Newton's removal from the State Board of Education retaliated for his vocal opposition to the Byrd Organization's plan to close public schools rather than allow them to be integrated (Newton advocated a "local option" to integrate).

In 1959, Newton proved a crucial member of the 19-member majority assisting Governor J. Lindsay Almond and Lieutenant Governor Gi Stephens in breaking with the Byrd Organization. Unlike the Byrd Organization, Newton supported the national Democratic ticket, including its nominee Adlai Stevenson in 1956 and John F. Kennedy in 1960.

Northern Neck voters reelected Newton to the state Senate (a part-time position) without opposition, but again with fierce Byrd opposition in the Democratic Party primary, in 1959 and 1963, but he retired in 1965 after an adverse reapportionment. His 29th District, renumbered the 28th during the 1960 reapportionment invalidated by the U.S. Supreme Court in Davis v. Mann, was combined with parts of the new 29th District (consisting of Hanover, Essex and Middlesex Counties and other Richmond suburbs to the west of the Northern Neck and held by fellow Democrat Leslie D. Campbell Jr. of Doswell, Virginia), and renumbered the 26th. The new 28th District in the 1965 election was what had been the 31st District, held by fellow Democrat Hunter Andrews.

After his retirement from the state senate, Newton continued to practice law part-time, as well as served as director of the Farmer's Bank of Hague.

== Death and memorials ==
Newton survived his wife by five years, dying in Richmond on April 30, 1977. He was buried in the family graveyard. In 2001, Westmoreland County named its new library in Hague for Newton. He is mentioned in papers donated to the College of William and Mary's Swem Library by his son, insurance executive and Northern Neck preservationist, Blake T. Newton, Jr.

Senate of Virginia
Preceded by Robert O. Norris, Jr.	Virginia Senate, District 29; 1956-1966	Succeeded by Leslie D. Campbell, Jr.
