= Granger Macfarlane =

American politician (1929–2025)

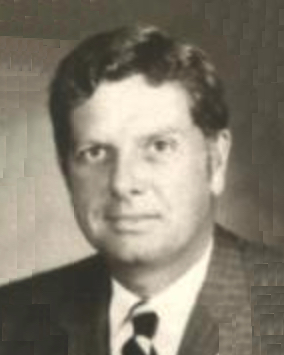
- Official portrait, 1984

Member of the Virginia Senate from the 21st district
- In office January 11, 1984 – January 8, 1992
- Preceded by: Ray L. Garland
- Succeeded by: Brandon Bell

Personal details
- Born: John Granger Macfarlane II; July 30, 1929 Washington, D.C., U.S.
- Died: June 25, 2025 (aged 95) Roanoke, Virginia, U.S.
- Party: Democratic
- Spouse: Anne Ernestine Beck (m. 1952; died 2025)
- Education: Duke University (BA)

Military service
- Branch/service: United States Marine Corps
- Battles/wars: Korean War

John Granger Macfarlane II (July 30, 1929 – June 23, 2025) was an American politician who served in the Virginia Senate from 1984 until he lost reelection in 1991.

Macfarlane died on June 23, 2025, at the age of 95.
