= Virginia's 13th Senate district =

American legislative district

- District map following the 2021 redistricting
- Senator: Lashrecse D. Aird
- Demographics: 60% White; 8% Black/African American; 17% Asian; 10% Hispanic
- Population: 263,426
- Registered voters: 191,339

Virginia's 13th Senate district elects one of the 40 members of the Virginia Senate, which is the upper house of the state's bicameral legislature, the Virginia General Assembly. It is currently represented by Lashrecse Aird.

Following the 2021 Virginia redistricting, the district was formed from parts of the 3rd, 9th, 15th, 16th and 18th Virginia Senate districts.

District map from the 2023 election

== Geography ==
District 13 covers all of Charles City County, Prince George County, Surry County, Sussex County, Hopewell City and Petersburg City; and parts of Dinwiddie County and Henrico County.

== 2023 election ==
Following redistricting, 2023 candidates for District 13 included state senator Joe Morrissey and former delegate Lashrecse Aird. Aird was endorsed by state senators Jennifer Boysko, Ghazala Hashmi, Barbara Favola, Janet Howell, Mamie Locke, and Louise Lucas.

== Recent election results ==
=== 2019 ===
2019 Virginia Senate election, District 13
Primary election
| Party | Candidate | Votes | % |
|---|---|---|---|
| Republican | Geary Higgins | 6,609 | 65.3 |
| Republican | Ron Meyer Jr. | 3,486 | 34.5 |
| Total votes | | 10,116 | 100 |
General election
| Democratic | John Bell | 44,762 | 54.3 |
| Republican | Geary Higgins | 37,645 | 45.6 |
| Total votes | | 82,502 | 100 |
| Democratic gain from Republican | | | |

=== 2015 ===
2015 Virginia Senate election, District 13
| Party | Candidate | Votes | % |
|---|---|---|---|
| Republican | Dick Black (incumbent) | 25,898 | 52.3 |
| Democratic | Jill McCabe | 23,544 | 47.5 |
| Total votes | | 49,526 | 100 |
| Republican hold | | | |

=== 2011 ===
2011 Virginia Senate election, District 13
Primary election
| Party | Candidate | Votes | % |
|---|---|---|---|
| Republican | Dick Black | 3,144 | 38.8 |
| Republican | John Stirrup | 3,036 | 37.4 |
| Republican | Robert Fitzsimmons | 1,925 | 23.7 |
| Total votes | | 8,109 | 100 |
General election
| Republican | Dick Black | 20,786 | 57.0 |
| Democratic | Jeffrey Mitchell | 15,613 | 42.8 |
| Total votes | | 36,497 | 100 |
| Republican hold | | | |

=== Federal and statewide results ===
| Year | Office | Results |
|---|---|---|
| 2020 | President | Biden 56.6–41.6% |
| 2017 | Governor | Northam 55.1–43.9% |
| 2016 | President | Clinton 51.3–43.1% |
| 2014 | Senate | Gillespie 53.6–44.4% |
| 2013 | Governor | Cuccinelli 49.8–45.4% |
| 2012 | President | Romney 51.3–47.6% |
| 2012 | Senate | Allen 51.1–48.9% |

== Historical results ==
All election results below took place prior to 2011 redistricting, and thus were under different district lines. Before the 2010 census, District 13 was located in the Hampton Roads metropolitan area. Before the 1960 census, the district was in Virginia's southwestern corner.

=== 2007 ===
2007 Virginia Senate election, District 13
Primary election
| Party | Candidate | Votes | % |
|---|---|---|---|
| Republican | Fred Quayle (incumbent) | 2,012 | 84.1 |
| Republican | Richard Ramsey | 379 | 15.9 |
| Total votes | | 2,391 | 100 |
| Democratic | Steve Heretick | 3,060 | 70.2 |
| Democratic | David Bouchard | 1,302 | 29.8 |
| Total votes | | 4,362 | 100 |
General election
| Republican | Fred Quayle (incumbent) | 21,114 | 58.6 |
| Democratic | Steve Heretick | 14,821 | 41.1 |
| Total votes | | 36,018 | 100 |
| Republican hold | | | |

=== 2003 ===
2003 Virginia Senate election, District 13
| Party | Candidate | Votes | % |
|---|---|---|---|
| Republican | Fred Quayle (incumbent) | 22,174 | 76.4 |
| Independent | Richard Ramsey | 6,735 | 23.2 |
| Total votes | | 29,008 | 100 |
| Republican hold | | | |

=== 1999 ===
1999 Virginia Senate election, District 13
| Party | Candidate | Votes | % |
|---|---|---|---|
| Republican | Fred Quayle (incumbent) | 17,789 | 56.7 |
| Democratic | Elizabeth Psimas | 13,532 | 43.1 |
| Total votes | | 31,371 | 100 |
| Republican hold | | | |

=== 1995 ===
1995 Virginia Senate election, District 13
| Party | Candidate | Votes | % |
|---|---|---|---|
| Republican | Fred Quayle (incumbent) | 18,576 | 51.3 |
| Democratic | Johnny Joannou | 17,637 | 48.7 |
| Total votes | | 36,227 | 100 |
| Republican hold | | | |
