= Warren E. Barry =

American politician (1933–2016)

Member of the Virginia Senate from the 37th district
- In office January 8, 1992 – August 17, 2002
- Preceded by: Madison Marye
- Succeeded by: Ken Cuccinelli

Member of the Virginia House of Delegates
- In office January 14, 1970 – January 11, 1984
- Preceded by: Dorothy S. McDiarmid
- Succeeded by: Robert K. Cunningham
- Constituency: 27th district (1970‍–‍1972); 19th district (1972‍–‍1982); 52nd district (1982‍–‍1983); 42nd district (1983‍–‍1984)

Personal details
- Born: Warren Everett Barry; August 4, 1933 Boston, Massachusetts, U.S.
- Died: March 31, 2016 (aged 82) Buffalo Junction, Mecklenburg County, Virginia, U.S.
- Party: Republican
- Spouses: Theresa McKay; Cheryl Moore
- Children: Stan, Jim, Scott
- Education: University of Massachusetts

Warren Everett Barry (August 4, 1933 – March 31, 2016) was an American businessman and politician.

Born in Boston, Massachusetts. He graduated from the University of Massachusetts Boston in 1954. He served in the United States Marine Corps from 1954 to 1958. Barry was a commercial industrial property manager in Springfield, Virginia. From 1970 to 1983, Barry served in the Virginia House of Delegates, until he resigned when elected Fairfax County Circuit Court Clerk. He then served in the Virginia State Senate from 1991 to 2002. Barry was a Republican.
