= Jane Woods =

American Republican politician (1946–2022)

10th Virginia Secretary of Health and Human Resources
- In office January 14, 2002 – January 14, 2006
- Governor: Mark Warner
- Preceded by: Louis Rossiter
- Succeeded by: Marilyn Tavenner

Member of the Virginia Senate from the 34th district
- In office January 8, 1992 – January 12, 2000
- Preceded by: Emilie Miller
- Succeeded by: Leslie Byrne

Member of the Virginia House of Delegates from the 37th district
- In office January 13, 1988 – January 8, 1992
- Preceded by: Stephen E. Gordy
- Succeeded by: Bob Harris

Personal details
- Born: Jane Alexandra Haycock; October 10, 1946 Bethesda, Maryland, U.S.
- Died: July 18, 2022 (aged 75) Fairfax, Virginia, U.S.
- Party: Republican
- Spouse: James R. F. Woods
- Education: American University (BA)

Jane Haycock Woods (October 10, 1946 – July 18, 2022) was an American educator and Republican politician who served as a member of the Virginia Senate from 1992 to 2000, and Virginia House of Delegates from 1988 to 1992.

== Biography ==
She was for many years an elementary teacher with Fairfax County Public Schools.

In 1999, Woods lost her Senate reelection bid against former U.S. Representative Leslie L. Byrne. In 2002, she was appointed Virginia Secretary of Health and Human Resources by Democratic Governor Mark Warner, serving in that role until 2006.

Virginia House of Delegates
Preceded by Stephen E. Gordy	Virginia Delegate for the 37th District; 1988–1992	Succeeded by Robert E. Harris
Senate of Virginia
Preceded by Emilie F. Miller	Virginia Senator for the 34th District; 1992–2000	Succeeded by Leslie L. Byrne
Political offices
Preceded by Louis Rossiter	Virginia Secretary of Health and Human Resources; 2002–2006	Succeeded by Marilyn Tavenner
