= 1983 Virginia Senate election =

1983 Virginia Senate elections
- November 8, 1983

All 40 seats in the Senate of Virginia 21 seats needed for a majority
- Turnout: 50.6% ▼1.05 pp
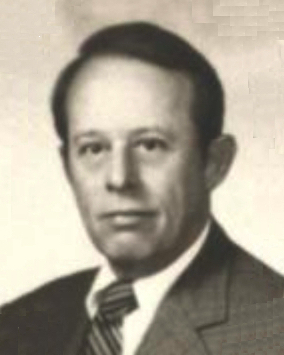

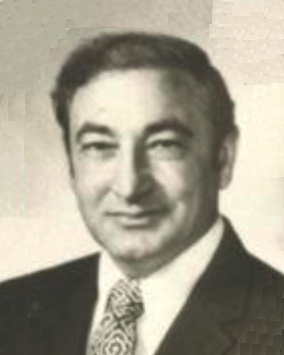
| | Majority party | Minority party |
|---|---|---|
| Leader | Hunter Andrews | William A. Truban |
| Party | Democratic | Republican |
| Leader since | January 9, 1980 | January 14, 1976 |
| Leader's seat | 1st | 27th |
| Last election | 30 seats, 63.5% | 10 seats, 35.2% |
| Seats won | 32 | 8 |
| Seat change | ▲2 | ▼2 |
| Popular vote | 634,957 | 332,548 |
| Percentage | 64.0% | 33.5% |
| Swing | ▲0.5 pp | ▼1.7 pp |
Majority leader before election
Hunter Andrews
Democratic
Elected Majority leader
Hunter Andrews
Democratic

All 40 seats in the Senate of Virginia were up for election on November 8, 1983, alongside the Virginia House of Delegates election.

== Overall results ==
↓
| 32 | 8 |
| Democratic | Republican |

| Parties | | Seats | | | | Popular Vote | | |
| Parties | | 1979 | 1983 | +/- | Strength | Vote | % | Change |
|---|---|---|---|---|---|---|---|---|
| | Democratic | 30 | 32 | ▲2 | 80.00% | 634,957 | 63.98% | ▲0.45% |
| | Republican | 10 | 8 | ▼2 | 20.00% | 332,548 | 33.51% | ▼1.67% |
| | Independent | 0 | 0 | Steady | 0.00% | 11,508 | 1.16% | ▼0.06% |
| - | Write-ins | 0 | 0 | Steady | 0.00% | | | |
| Total | | 40 | 40 | 0 | 100.00% | 992,460 | 100.00% | - |

== See also ==
- United States elections, 1983
- Virginia elections, 1983
  - Virginia House of Delegates election, 1983
