= Virginia's 33rd Senate district =

American legislative district

Virginia's 33rd State Senate district
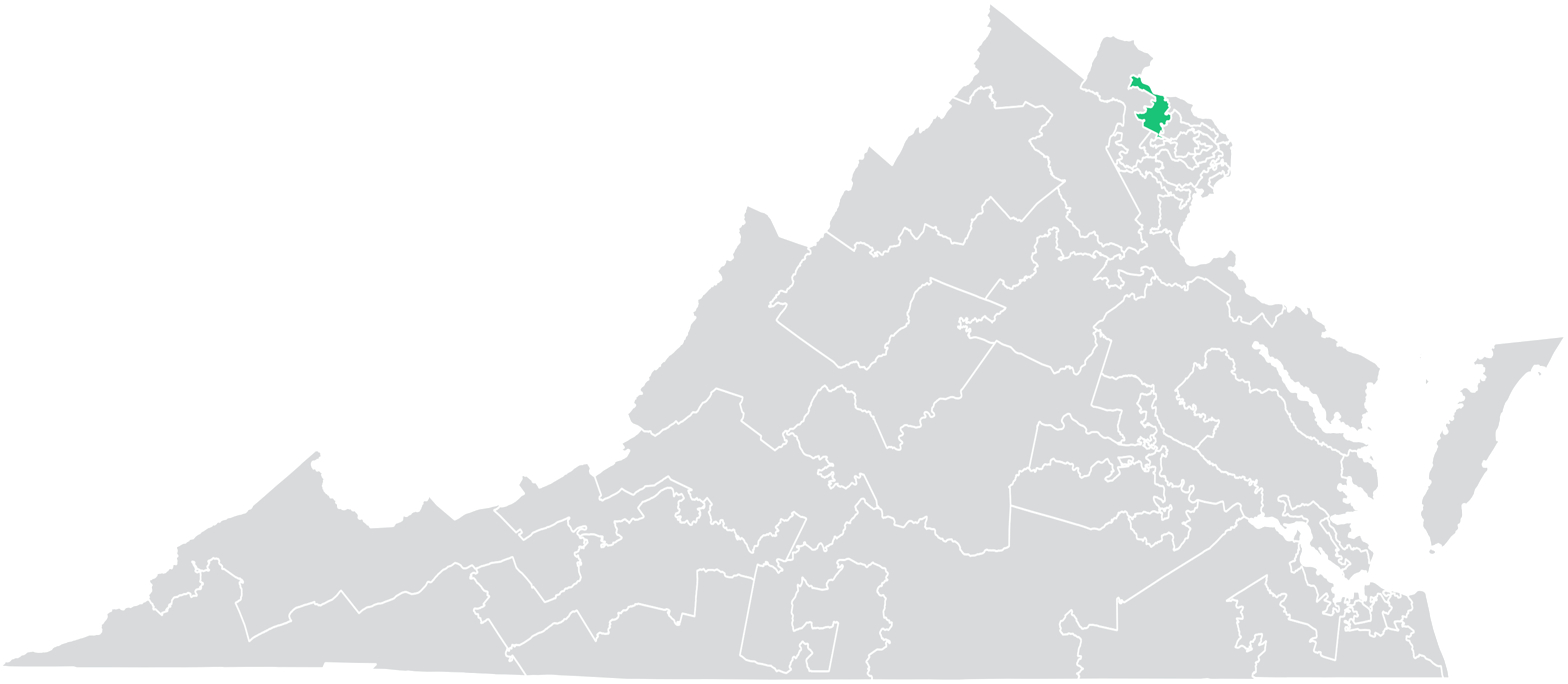
Senator
Jennifer Carroll Foy; D–Woodbridge
- Demographics: 43% White; 9% Black; 21% Hispanic; 22% Asian; 4% Other
- Population (2019): 235,207
- Registered voters: 141,590

Virginia's 33rd Senate district is one of 40 districts in the Senate of Virginia. It has been represented by Democrat Jennifer Boysko since a 2019 special election to replace fellow Democrat Jennifer Wexton, who had been elected to Congress.

== Geography ==
District 33 is split between Loudoun and Fairfax Counties in the suburbs of Washington D.C., including some or all of Leesburg, Cascades, Ashburn, Sterling, Brambleton, McNair, and Herndon. Washington Dulles International Airport is also within the district lines.

The district overlaps with Virginia's 10th and 11th congressional districts, and with the 10th, 32nd, 33rd, 34th, 36th, 67th, 86th, and 87th districts of the Virginia House of Delegates. It borders the state of Maryland.

== Recent election results ==
=== 2019 ===
County results Boysko: 60–70%; 70–80%

2019 Virginia Senate election, District 33
Party	Candidate	Votes	%
Democratic	Jennifer Boysko (incumbent)	34,517	64.9
Republican	Suzanne Fox	18,615	35.0
Total votes		53,186	100
Democratic hold			

=== 2019 special ===
County results Boysko: 60–70%; 70–80%

2019 Virginia Senate special election, District 33
Party	Candidate	Votes	%
Democratic	Jennifer Boysko	14,779	69.8
Republican	Joe T. May	6,377	30.1
Total votes		21,183	100
Democratic hold			

=== 2015 ===
County results Wexton: 50–60%; 60–70%

2015 Virginia Senate election, District 33
Party	Candidate	Votes	%
Democratic	Jennifer Wexton (incumbent)	18,577	56.6
Republican	Stephen Hollingshead	14,190	43.2
Write-in		59	0.2
Total votes		32,826	100
Democratic hold			

=== 2014 special ===
County results Wexton: 50–60%; 60–70%

2014 Virginia Senate special election, District 33
Party	Candidate	Votes	%
Democratic	Jennifer Wexton	11,431	52.7
Republican	John Whitbeck	8,133	37.5
Independent	Joe T. May	2,117	9.8
Total votes		21,685	100
Democratic hold			

=== 2011 ===
County results Herring: 50–60%

2011 Virginia Senate election, District 33
Party	Candidate	Votes	%
Democratic	Mark Herring (incumbent)	14,061	54.1
Republican	Patricia Phillips	11,915	45.8
Total votes		26,013	100
Democratic hold			

=== Federal and statewide results ===
Year	Office	Results
2020	President	Biden 68.1–30.1%
2018	Senate	Kaine 69.4–28.4%
2017	Governor	Northam 66.7–32.1%
2016	President	Clinton 63.1–31.1%
2014	Senate	Warner 55.6–41.8%
2013	Governor	McAuliffe 56.3–38.4%
2012	President	Obama 59.3–39.4%
2012	Senate	Kaine 60.2–39.8%

== Historical results ==
All election results below took place prior to 2011 redistricting, and thus were under different district lines.

=== 2007 ===
2007 Virginia Senate election, District 33
Party	Candidate	Votes	%
Democratic	Mark Herring (incumbent)	27,784	56.9
Republican	Patricia Phillips	20,994	43.0
Total votes		48,833	100
Democratic hold			

=== 2006 special ===
2006 Virginia Senate special election, District 33
Party	Candidate	Votes	%
Democratic	Mark Herring	12,381	61.6
Republican	D. M. Staton, Jr.	7,689	38.3
Total votes		20,090	100
Democratic gain from Republican			

=== 2003 ===
2003 Virginia Senate election, District 33
Party	Candidate	Votes	%
Republican	Bill Mims (incumbent)	27,818	97.3
Total votes		28,598	100
Republican hold			

=== 1999 ===
1999 Virginia Senate election, District 33
Party	Candidate	Votes	%
Republican	Bill Mims (incumbent)	30,472	77.3
Independent	Garry Myers	8,869	22.5
Total votes		39,420	100
Republican hold			

=== 1998 special ===
1998 Virginia Senate special election, District 33
Party	Candidate	Votes	%
Republican	Bill Mims	11,623	61.8
Democratic	Jean Brown	7,030	37.3
Libertarian	Bill Redpath	160	0.9
Total votes		18,822	100
Republican gain from Democratic			

=== 1995 ===
1995 Virginia Senate election, District 33
Party	Candidate	Votes	%
Democratic	Charles Waddell (incumbent)	21,782	54.9
Republican	David Olson	17,844	45.0
Total votes		39,646	100
Democratic hold			

== List of members ==
Senator	Party	Tenure	Electoral history
Leroy Bendheim	Democratic	January 12, 1966 – January 12, 1972	Previously served as Senator from the 36th district. Later served as Senator from the 30th district, due to redistricting.
Charles Waddell	Democratic	January 12, 1972 – January 16, 1998	Previously served on the Loudoun County Board of Supervisors. Resigned after being appointed deputy transportation secretary.
Bill Mims	Republican	January 23, 1998 – January 14, 2006	Previously served as Delegate from the 32nd district. Resigned after being appointed chief deputy attorney general of Virginia, later becoming Attorney General. Later served as a justice on the Supreme Court of Virginia.
Mark Herring	Democratic	February 1, 2006 – January 11, 2014	Previously served on the Loudoun County Board of Supervisors. Elected in a January 31, 2006 special election. Re-elected to a full term in the November 2007 election and re-elected in November 2011. Resigned after being elected Attorney General of Virginia.
Jennifer Wexton	Democratic	January 24, 2014 – January 3, 2019	Elected in a January 21, 2014 special election. Re-elected to a full term in November 2015. Resigned after being elected U.S. Representative for Virginia's 10th District
Jennifer Boysko	Democratic	January 11, 2019 – Present	Previously served as Delegate from the 86th district. Elected in a January 9, 2019 special election.
