= William E. Fears =

American politician

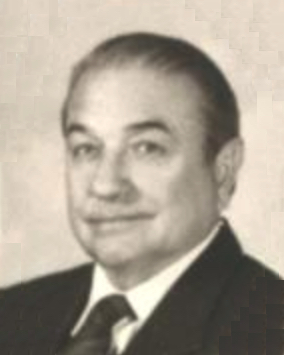
- Official portrait, 1984

Member of the Virginia Senate
- In office January 10, 1968 – January 8, 1992
- Preceded by: E. Almer Ames Jr.
- Succeeded by: Tommy Norment
- Constituency: 1st district (1968–1972); 3rd district (1972–1992)

Personal details
- Born: William Earl Fears; September 28, 1920 Jonesboro, Arkansas, U.S.
- Died: August 25, 2008 (aged 87) Onancock, Virginia, U.S.
- Party: Democratic
- Spouse: Belle DeCormis (m. 1944)
- Children: 2
- Education: Yale University (BA); University of Cincinnati (JD)

Military service
- Branch/service: United States Army; Army Air Forces
- Years of service: 1943–1945
- Battles/wars: World War II

William Earl Fears (September 28, 1920 – August 25, 2008) was a long-serving Democratic member of the Senate of Virginia from the 1960s to the 1990s.

== Early life and career ==
Fears was born in Jonesboro, Arkansas on September 28, 1920. He left home at the age of 13 to live with relatives on Maryland's Eastern Shore and in New York. In 1943, Fears earned a bachelor's degree in metallurgical engineering at Yale University. He served in the U.S. Army Air Forces during World War II. He saw combat as a lieutenant in the 92nd Bombardment Group based in England. After military service, Fears earned a Juris Doctor degree from the University of Cincinnati. He practiced law in Pittsburgh, Pennsylvania and New York City before relocating to Accomac, Virginia on Virginia's Eastern Shore in 1950, where he practiced law for 50 years.

== Political career ==
Fears served as Commonwealth's Attorney for Accomac County, Virginia until his election to the Virginia Senate in 1967. He defeated incumbent Senator E. Almer Ames Jr. "a Byrd Organization stalwart" to secure the Democratic nomination and was subsequently elected to represent the 1st District.

In 1971, the Virginia General Assembly was redistricted and Senator Fears' home in Accomac County was placed in the 3rd District which included part of the Virginia Peninsula in addition to the Eastern Shore counties of Accomac and Northampton. He was re-elected to the Senate throughout the 1970s and 1980s. In 1991, the 3rd District was redrawn to include more Republican-leaning territory on the Virginia Peninsula. During the legislative session that year, Fears spoke against increasing penalties for drunk driving, saying, "We're going to take all the sport out of drinking and driving." That November, Republican Tommy Norment defeated Fears.

== Death ==
William E. Fears died on August 25, 2008.

Senate of Virginia
Preceded by E. Almer Ames Jr.	Virginia Senator for the 1st district 1968–1972	Succeeded by Hunter Andrews
Preceded by William H. Hodges	Virginia Senator for the 3rd district 1972–1992	Succeeded by Tommy Norment
