= Clarence A. Holland =

American politician (1929–2023)

Clancy Holland

Member of the Virginia Senate from the 7th district
- In office January 11, 1984 – January 10, 1996
- Preceded by: Evelyn Momsen Hailey
- Succeeded by: Ed Schrock

17th Mayor of Virginia Beach
- In office July 1, 1976 – June 30, 1978
- Preceded by: J. Curtis Payne
- Succeeded by: Patrick L. Standing

Member of the Virginia Beach City Council from the Bayside district
- In office September 8, 1970 – June 30, 1982
- Preceded by: Lawrence E. Marshall
- Succeeded by: Louis R. Jones

Personal details
- Born: Clarence Adrian Holland; June 21, 1929 Windsor, Virginia, U.S.
- Died: November 11, 2023 (aged 94) Virginia Beach, Virginia, U.S.
- Party: Democratic
- Spouse: Mary Elizabeth Burton
- Parent: Shirley T. Holland (father)
- Relatives: Richard J. Holland (brother)
- Education: Hampden–Sydney College; Medical College of Virginia

Military service
- Branch/service: United States Navy
- Rank: Lieutenant

Clarence Adrian Holland (June 21, 1929 – November 11, 2023) was an American politician who served as mayor of Virginia Beach, Virginia and later in the Virginia Senate from the 7th district from 1984 to 1996. He spent fifty-three years working as a family physician. Holland died in Virginia Beach on November 11, 2023, at the age of 94.

Political offices
Preceded by J. Curtis Payne	Mayor of Virginia Beach, Virginia; 1976–1978	Succeeded by Patrick L. Standing
Senate of Virginia
Preceded by Peter K. Babalas	Virginia Senator for the 7th District; 1984–1996	Succeeded by Ed Schrock
