= Johnny Joannou =

American politician

Member of the Virginia House of Delegates from the 79th district
- In office January 14, 1998 – January 13, 2016
- Preceded by: William S. Moore Jr.
- Succeeded by: Steve Heretick
- In office January 12, 1983 – January 11, 1984
- Preceded by: None (district created)
- Succeeded by: William S. Moore Jr.

Member of the Virginia Senate from the 13th district
- In office January 11, 1984 – January 8, 1992
- Preceded by: Willard J. Moody
- Succeeded by: Fred Quayle

Member of the Virginia House of Delegates from the 39th district
- In office January 13, 1982 – January 12, 1983 Serving with L. Cleaves Manning
- Succeeded by: Vivian Watts

Member of the Virginia House of Delegates from the 41st district
- In office January 14, 1976 – January 13, 1982
- Preceded by: Lester E. Schlitz
- Succeeded by: Sam Glasscock

Personal details
- Born: Johnny Savas Joannou; April 22, 1940 Brooklyn, New York, U.S.
- Died: May 6, 2016 (aged 76) Portsmouth, Virginia, U.S.
- Party: Democratic
- Spouse: Chris Paul Kolantis (m. 1967–2016)
- Children: One
- Education: Virginia Tech (BS); University of Richmond (LLB)
- Profession: Lawyer

Johnny Savas Joannou (April 22, 1940 – May 6, 2016) was an American politician of the Democratic Party. He was a member of the Virginia House of Delegates 1976–1983, the Senate of Virginia 1984–1991, and the House again from 1998 to 2016. He last represented the 79th district, made up of parts of the cities of Chesapeake, Norfolk, Portsmouth, and Suffolk. Joannou died of lung cancer, on May 6, 2016, in Portsmouth, Virginia.
