= Marty Williams =

American politician (born 1951)

Member of the Virginia Senate from the 1st district
- In office January 10, 1996 – January 9, 2008
- Preceded by: Hunter Andrews
- Succeeded by: John Miller

Personal details
- Born: Martin Edward Williams; March 5, 1951 (age 75) Newport News, Virginia, U.S.
- Party: Republican
- Spouses: LaDonna Finch (divorced); Stephanie Bishop

Martin Edward Williams (born March 5, 1951) is a Republican politician who served in the Senate of Virginia from 1996 to 2008.

== Early life and career ==
Williams was born in Virginia on March 5, 1951.

== Political career ==
Williams served on the Newport News City Council for six years and was twice elected Vice-Mayor by his peers. In 1995, Williams challenged long-term Senator Hunter Andrews in the 1st Senate District and defeated him. In 2007, Williams was challenged in the Republican Primary and was defeated by conservative local activist Patricia "Tricia" Stall. Stall went on to lose her election to Democrat John Miller.

Senate of Virginia
Preceded by Hunter Andrews	Virginia Senate, District 1; 1996–2008	Succeeded by John C. Miller
