= Joseph V. Gartlan Jr. =

American politician

Member of the Virginia Senate from the 36th district
- In office January 1972 – January 2000
- Preceded by: new district
- Succeeded by: Toddy Puller

Personal details
- Born: September 21, 1925 Glen Head, New York
- Died: July 18, 2008 (aged 82) Alexandria, Virginia
- Party: Democratic
- Education: Georgetown University; Georgetown University Law Center
- Profession: Lawyer

Military service
- Allegiance: United States
- Branch/service: United States Navy
- Years of service: 1943–1946
- Rank: Lieutenant
- Battles/wars: World War II

Joseph Vincent Gartlan Jr. (September 21, 1925 – July 18, 2008) was a lawyer and Democratic politician who served in the Senate of Virginia for 28 years.

== Early life and career ==
Gartlan was born in Glen Head, New York, on September 21, 1925. He served in the U.S. Navy during World War II from 1943 to 1946.

After the war he attended Georgetown University, graduating with a bachelor's degree in 1949. He received his law degree from the Georgetown University Law Center in 1952. Gartlan practiced law as a partner in the Washington, D.C., firm of Melrod, Redman and Gartlan until 1971.

== Political career ==
In 1971, the Virginia General Assembly drew new districts reflecting the changes in population captured in the 1970 federal census and the recent Supreme Court decision in the case of Davis v. Mann that mandated equipopulous senate districts. Gartlan was the Democratic nominee in the 36th district which covered eastern portions of Fairfax County. He was elected to the Senate for the first time in November 1971. Gartlan served in the Senate for 28 years, serving as Chair of three committees: Rehabilitation and Social Services, Privileges and Elections and Courts of Justice.

Gartlan's legislative accomplishments included environmental laws and laws affecting the delivery of mental health services by the state, including co-sponsoring legislation that repealed laws allowing forced sterilization of mentally ill patients without their consent.

He was a member of Mount Vernon's Good Shepherd Catholic Church, Mount Vernon-Lee Chamber of Commerce, Virginia Citizens Consumer Council, Inc., Knights of Columbus, Chesapeake Bay Commission, Social Action Linking Together (SALT), American College of Trial Lawyers, and a lecturer in law at the University of Virginia Law School.

== Death and memorials ==
In 2001, the Franconia–Springfield Parkway (SR 289) was given the additional name of Joseph V. Gartlan Jr. Parkway. The name is ceremonial, and is rarely used by the public. Gartlan is the first Virginia politician to have a major highway named after him while he was still alive.

Gartlan died at Inova Mount Vernon Hospital on July 18, 2008, after a brief illness. A handicapped accessible marsh trail in the Elizabeth Hartwell Mason Neck National Wildlife Refuge is named in his honor, as indicated by a plaque at its entrance.

Senate of Virginia
Preceded by new district	Virginia Senate, District 36; 1972–2000	Succeeded by Toddy Puller
