= Richard J. Holland =

American politician

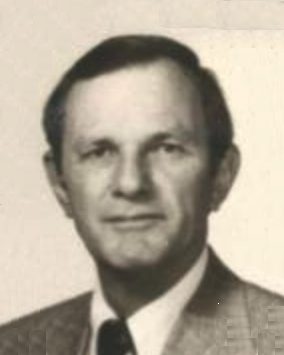
- Official portrait, 1980

Member of the Virginia Senate from the 15th district
- In office January 9, 1980 – April 16, 2000
- Preceded by: J. Lewis Rawls Jr.
- Succeeded by: Frank Ruff

Personal details
- Born: Richard Joyner Holland; August 12, 1925 Windsor, Virginia, U.S.
- Died: April 16, 2000 (aged 74) Windsor, Virginia, U.S.
- Party: Democratic
- Spouse: Jean Marks Culpepper (died 1997)
- Parent: Shirley T. Holland (father)
- Relatives: Clarence Holland (brother)
- Education: University of Virginia
- Occupation: Banker; politician

Military service
- Branch/service: United States Navy
- Years of service: 1943–1946
- Rank: Lieutenant (junior grade)
- Battles/wars: World War II; Pacific theater

Richard Joyner Holland (August 12, 1925 – April 16, 2000) was an American politician who was elected to six terms in the Virginia Senate.
