= Joseph B. Benedetti =

American politician and lawyer

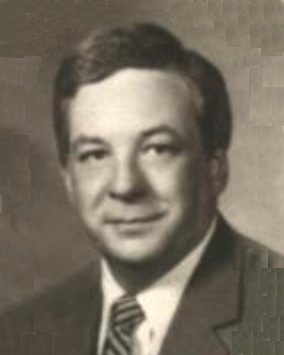

Member of the Virginia Senate from the 10th district
- In office September 15, 1986 – January 13, 1998
- Preceded by: Edward E. Willey
- Succeeded by: John Watkins

Member of the Virginia House of Delegates from the 68th district
- In office January 12, 1983 – September 15, 1986
- Preceded by: Walter H. Emroch
- Succeeded by: E. Hatcher Crenshaw, Jr.

Personal details
- Born: Joseph Benedict Benedetti; March 28, 1929 Richmond, Virginia, U.S.
- Died: November 19, 2014 (aged 85) Richmond, Virginia, U.S.
- Party: Republican
- Spouse(s): Marguerite Nolte; Sallie Belle Gwaltney
- Education: College of William & Mary; University of Richmond

Military service
- Allegiance: United States
- Branch/service: United States Army
- Years of service: 1946–1947; 1951–1962
- Rank: Major
- Battles/wars: Korean War

Joseph Benedict "Joe" Benedetti (March 28, 1929 – November 19, 2014) was an American politician and lawyer.

Born in Richmond, Virginia, he served in the United States Army in 1946 during the occupation of Japan, the Korean War, and the Berlin Crisis of 1961. He received his bachelor's degree from the College of William & Mary and his law degree from the University of Richmond School of Law. Benedetti practiced law in Richmond, Virginia. He served in the Virginia House of Delegates in 1983 and was a Republican. In 1986, he was elected to the Virginia State Senate and served until 1995. Benedetti was appointed chairman of the Virginia State Board of Corrections and then head of the Virginia Department of Criminal Justice Services. Benedetti died in Richmond, Virginia.

Virginia House of Delegates
Preceded by Walter H. Emroch	Virginia Delegate for the 68th District; 1983–1986	Succeeded by E. Hatcher Crenshaw, Jr.
Senate of Virginia
Preceded by Edward E. Willey	Virginia Senator for the 10th District; 1986–1998	Succeeded by John Watkins
Preceded by William A. Truban	Senate Minority Leader; 1992–1996	Succeeded by Richard L. Saslaw
