= Edward M. Holland =

American politician

Honorable Edward M. Holland

Member of the Virginia Senate from the 31st district
- In office January 1972 – January 1996
- Preceded by: Newly Created District
- Succeeded by: Mary Margaret Whipple

Personal details
- Born: November 28, 1939 (age 86) Washington, DC
- Party: Democratic
- Education: Princeton University; University of Virginia; Georgetown University
- Profession: Attorney
- Committees: Courts of Justice (chair); Commerce and Labor; Finance; Education and Health; Rules

Edward M. Holland (born November 28, 1939) is an attorney in Northern Virginia and was a member of the Virginia Senate from 1972 - 1996.

== Early life and education ==
Holland was born in Washington, DC on November 28, 1939. He attended the Hill School and graduated from Princeton University in 1962. He received his law degree from the University of Virginia in 1965 and was admitted to the Virginia bar. Holland received a masters in tax law from Georgetown University in 1967.

== Political career ==
In 1972, Holland ran for and was elected as a Democrat to the Virginia Senate representing part of Arlington County, Virginia. He served for 24 years in that body on a number of committees, including Courts of Justice, Commerce and Labor, Finance, Education and Health, and Rules. He chaired Courts of Justice for a number of years. During his time in the Senate, Holland also served on the Judicial Council of Virginia, the Committee on District Courts and the Northern Virginia Transportation Commission.

== Legal practice ==
Ed Holland maintains a law office in Falls Church, Virginia.

Senate of Virginia
| Preceded by Newly Created District | Virginia Senate, District 31; 1972-1996 | Succeeded by Mary Margaret Whipple |
