= 2015 Virginia elections =

- November 3, 2015

The 2015 Virginia elections took place on November 3, 2015. All 40 seats of the Senate of Virginia and 100 seats in the Virginia House of Delegates were up for re-election, as were many local offices.

== Senate of Virginia ==
All 40 seats of the Virginia Senate were up for election. Republicans retained their 21–19 majority.

== House of Delegates ==
All 100 seats of the Virginia House of Delegates were up for election. Democrats gained one seat.
