= Charles L. Waddell =

American politician (1932–2022)

Charles Waddell
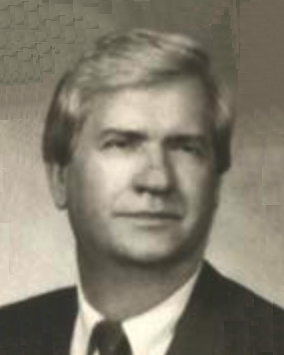
- Waddell in 1988

Member of the Virginia Senate from the 33rd district
- In office January 12, 1972 – January 16, 1998
- Preceded by: Leroy Bendheim
- Succeeded by: Bill Mims

Member of the Loudoun County Board of Supervisors from the Broad Run District
- In office January 1, 1968 – December 31, 1971
- Preceded by: Emory Kirkpatrick
- Succeeded by: John Costello

Personal details
- Born: Charles Lindbergh Waddell; May 13, 1932 Braselton, Georgia, U.S.
- Died: July 19, 2022 (aged 90) Leesburg, Virginia, U.S.
- Party: Democratic
- Spouse(s): Marie Dawson (m. 1954) Jane Rankin Herring (m. 1998; died 2017)
- Relations: Mark Herring (step-son)

Charles Lindy Waddell (May 13, 1932 – July 19, 2022) was an American politician who served for 26 years as a member of the Virginia Senate. He left the Senate to serve as deputy transportation secretary to Governor Jim Gilmore. At his retirement, he was chairman of the Senate transportation committee. Before serving as senator, Waddell served one term on the Loudoun County Board of Supervisors, representing the Broad Run District from 1968 to 1971.

In 1998 he married Jane Rankin Herring, the mother of future 33rd District Senator and Virginia Attorney General, Mark Herring. After Jane's death in 2017, he resided in Leesburg, Virginia. Waddell died on July 19, 2022, at the age of 90.
