= Frank W. Nolen =

American politician

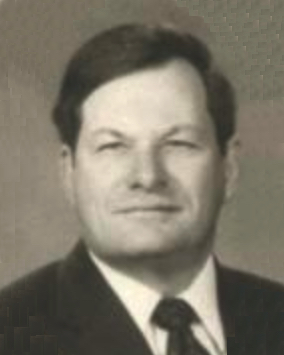

Member of the Virginia Senate from the 24th district
- In office January 11, 1978 – January 10, 1996
- Preceded by: Marshall Coleman
- Succeeded by: Emmett Hanger
- In office January 8, 1975 – January 14, 1976
- Preceded by: H. Dunlop Dawbarn
- Succeeded by: Marshall Coleman

Personal details
- Born: Frank William Nolen; December 26, 1939 (age 86) Cartoogechaye, North Carolina, U.S.
- Party: Democratic
- Education: Virginia Tech (BSEE)

Frank William Nolen (born December 26, 1939) is an American politician who served as a member of the Virginia Senate. Winning a 1974 special election to succeed H. Dunlop Dawbarn after his retirement, he lost reelection in 1975 to J. Marshall Coleman. When Coleman resigned to become Attorney General in 1977, Nolen won back his old seat.

As of January 2021, Nolen was the chairman of the Augusta County Democratic Committee.
