= Fred Quayle =

American politician (1936–2018)

Member of the Virginia Senate from the 13th district
- In office January 8, 1992 – January 11, 2012
- Preceded by: Johnny Joannou
- Succeeded by: Dick Black

Personal details
- Born: Frederick MacDonald Quayle; February 16, 1936 Suffolk, Virginia, U.S.
- Died: November 24, 2018 (aged 82) Suffolk, Virginia, U.S
- Party: Republican
- Spouse: Brenda Smith (m. 1977–2018)
- Children: 4
- Education: University of Virginia (BA); University of Richmond (LLB)
- Profession: Lawyer

Frederick MacDonald Quayle (February 16, 1936 – November 24, 2018) was an American politician and lawyer.

== Political career ==
Quayle served in the Virginia Senate and was a Republican. Quayle represented the 13th District in the Commonwealth of Virginia. His district included parts of the cities of Chesapeake, Franklin, Hopewell, Portsmouth, Suffolk, all of Surry County and parts of Isle of Wight and Southampton counties. Quayle was first elected in 1991, and was reelected four consecutive times. Quayle sat on the following committees: Courts of Justice, Education and Health, Finance, Rules, and Local Government, for which he was the chair. In November 2007, Quayle defeated his Democratic opponent, Steve Heretick, by an 18 percent margin. He didn't stand for reelection in 2011 partly due to redistricting.

== Early life and education ==
Quayle was born in Suffolk, Virginia and graduated from Suffolk High School in 1954. He earned a B.A. in economics at the University of Virginia in 1959, where he was an accomplished lacrosse player and a member of the now defunct Phi Kappa Sigma fraternity. Quayle studied law at T.C. Williams School of Law at the University of Richmond and earned his LL.B. in 1966.

== Personal life ==
Quayle lived in Suffolk and served in the United States Army Reserves. He also taught Political Science at Old Dominion University in Norfolk, Virginia. He married Brenda Lee Smith in 1977, with whom he had four children, including film and television composer Mac Quayle. He died on November 24, 2018, from a short illness.
