= Brandon Bell (Virginia politician) =

American former Virginia state senator and businessman

Member of the Virginia Senate from the 22nd district
- In office January 14, 2004 – January 9, 2008
- Preceded by: Bo Trumbo
- Succeeded by: Ralph K. Smith

Member of the Virginia Senate from the 21st district
- In office January 11, 1992 – January 10, 1996
- Preceded by: Granger Macfarlane
- Succeeded by: John Edwards

Personal details
- Born: John Brandon Bell II; December 20, 1958 (age 67) Charlottesville, Virginia, U.S.
- Party: Independent
- Other political affiliations: Republican (formerly)
- Spouse: Debbie Hurley Bell
- Education: BA, Business Administration, Mississippi State University, 1980
- Occupation: Small Businessman, Financial Consultant

John Brandon Bell II (born December 20, 1958) is an American former Virginia state senator and small businessman from Charlottesville. Bell was state senator for two non-consecutive terms, replacing Republican State Senator Malfourd W. Trumbo in an open race over Democratic Party Candidate Stephen H. Emick (a relative of Malfourd's predecessor Dudley J. Emick Jr.) when Trumbo retired after 3 terms, having first been elected in 1991.

Bell did not continue on to the general election four years later in 2007, having lost the Republican Party Primary by 75 votes to the former one term Roanoke Mayor Ralph K. Smith, largely due to his proposal of a bill seeking to ban smoking in private businesses throughout the state, a bill which failed, however a similar bill, sponsored by Senator Ralph Northam, a Democrat from Norfolk, succeeded in banning smoking in private businesses in 2009.

== Electoral history ==
Virginia State Senate election in the 21st District, 1991
Party	Candidate	Votes	%	±%
Republican	J. Brandon Bell II		53.49%	+16.84%
Democratic	John G. Macfarlane (inc.)		46.45%	−16.89%
Republican gain from Democratic		Swing	N/A	

Virginia State Senate election in the 21st District, 1995
Party	Candidate	Votes	%	±%
Republican	J. Brandon Bell II (inc.)		45.43%	−8.06%
Democratic	John S. Edwards		54.56%	+8.11%
Democratic gain from Republican		Swing	N/A	

Virginia State Senate election in the 22nd District, 2003
Party	Candidate	Votes	%	±%
Republican	J. Brandon Bell II		53.49%	+16.84%
Democratic	John G. Macfarlane		46.45%	−16.89%
Republican gain from Democratic		Swing	N/A	

Virginia State Senate election in the 22nd District, 2007
Party	Candidate	Votes	%	±%
Republican	J. Brandon Bell, II		53.49%	+16.84%
Democratic	John G. Macfarlane (inc.)		46.45%	−16.89%
Republican gain from Democratic		Swing	N/A	
