= Hunter Andrews =

American politician (1921–2005)

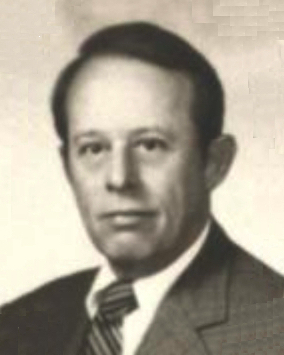

Member of the Virginia Senate
- In office January 8, 1964 – January 10, 1996
- Preceded by: Fred W. Bateman
- Succeeded by: Marty Williams
- Constituency: 31st district (1964–1968); 28th district (1968–1972); 1st district (1972–1996)

Personal details
- Born: Hunter Booker Andrews; May 28, 1921 Hampton, Virginia, U.S.
- Died: January 13, 2005 (aged 83) Hampton, Virginia, U.S.
- Party: Democratic
- Spouse: Cynthia Bentley Collings
- Education: College of William & Mary; University of Virginia

Military service
- Branch/service: United States Navy
- Years of service: 1942–1946
- Battles/wars: World War II; Pacific theater

Hunter Booker Andrews (May 28, 1921 – January 13, 2005) was a long-serving Democratic member of the Senate of Virginia from Hampton, Virginia. He served as Senate Majority leader of the Senate from 1980 until his defeat in 1995.

== Early life and career ==
A native and lifelong resident of Hampton, Andrews was born on May 28, 1921. He attended public schools of his hometown and was a 1938 graduate of Hampton High School. In 1942, he graduated from the College of William & Mary, and subsequently served as an ensign in the United States Navy for four years in the Pacific Theatre during World War II. Andrews was a 1948 graduate of the University of Virginia Law School. Returning from school, Andrews practiced law in Hampton. He married Cynthia Bentley Collings.

== Political career ==
Andrews served as chair of the Hampton School Board, leading the city schools through racial integration at a time when other counties and cities were struggling to stop integration as part of a policy of massive resistance. In 1962, he ran for and was elected to the State Senate from the 31st district. He was reelected to 9 terms in the 28th district and from 1972 until 1996 in the 1st district. He rose to be majority leader of the Senate from 1980 to 1995 and served as chair of the powerful Senate Finance Committee. According to The Washington Post, "Mr. Andrews was the longest-serving senator in the state's history, and when the Democrats controlled the 40-member Senate, he was also its majority leader. He wielded enormous clout during the three decades when the Democrats controlled every branch of the state's government, and his power often matched that of the nine governors under whom he served."

For many years, Andrews served on the board of visitors of the College of William & Mary. He was defeated for reelection in 1995, and returned to the practice of law in Hampton until his retirement in 2003. In 1995 the Virginia Bar Association awarded him its Distinguished Service Award.

== Death and memorials ==
Andrews died of a heart attack at his home on January 13, 2005. His funeral was held at St. John's Episcopal Church in Hampton and burial was in the church cemetery. Hunter B. Andrews Elementary School in Hampton, Virginia is named for the senator.

Senate of Virginia
Preceded by Fred W. Bateman	Virginia Senate, District 31; 1964–1968	Succeeded by District Eliminated
Preceded by Blake T. Newton	Virginia Senate, District 28; 1968–1972	Succeeded by Paul W. Manns
Preceded by William E. Fears	Virginia Senate, District 1; 1972–1996	Succeeded by Marty Williams
