= Virginia's 34th Senate district =

American legislative district

Virginia's 34th State Senate district
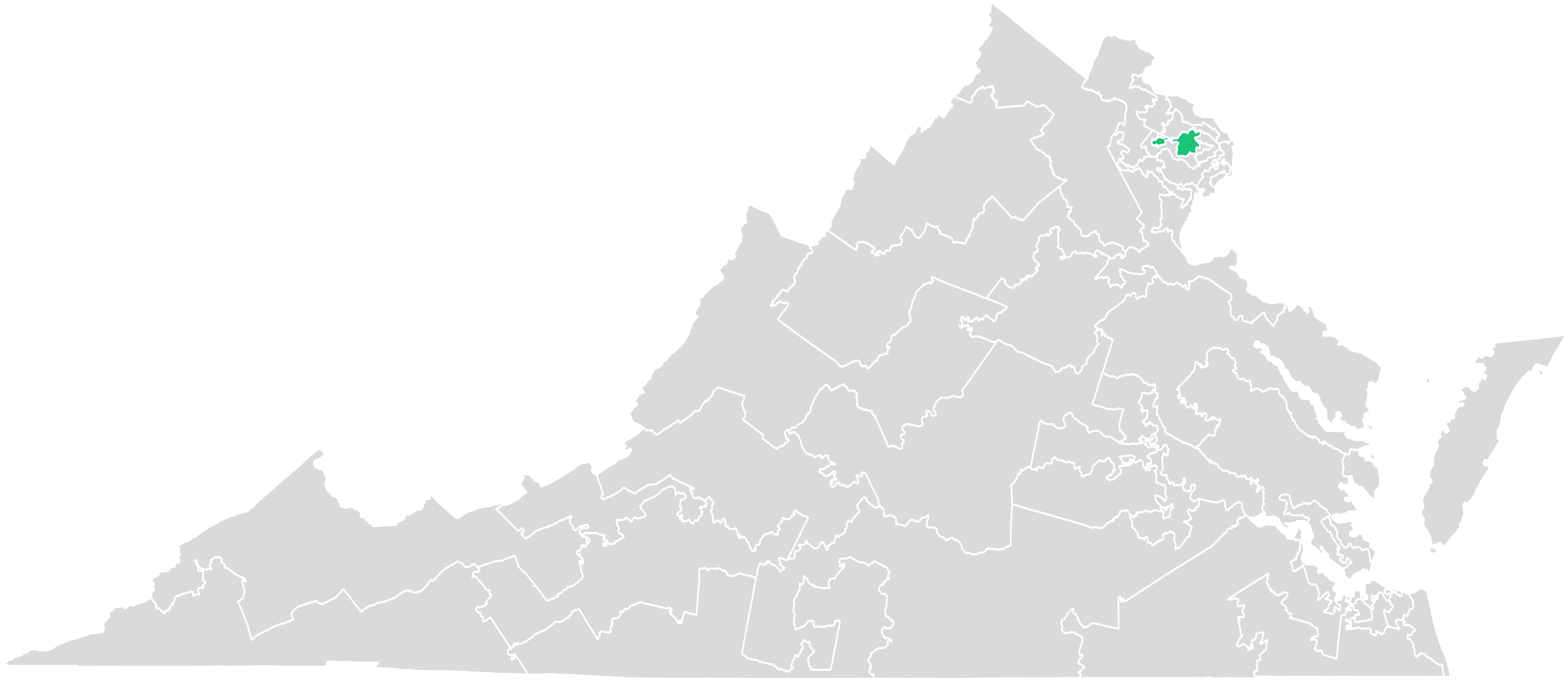
Senator
| Scott Surovell; D–Mount Vernon |
- Demographics: 56% White; 6% Black; 12% Hispanic; 21% Asian; 4% Other
- Population (2019): 205,486
- Registered voters: 142,507

Virginia's 34th Senate district is one of 40 districts in the Senate of Virginia. It is currently represented by Democrat Scott Surovell, who previously represented the 36th district.

== Geography ==
District 34 includes all of the City of Fairfax and parts of Fairfax County in the suburbs of Washington, D.C., including some or all of Vienna, Dunn Loring, Merrifield, Oakton, Fair Oaks, Chantilly, and Centreville.

The district overlaps with Virginia's 10th and 11th congressional districts, and with the 35th, 37th, 39th, 40th, 41st, 53rd, and 67th districts of the Virginia House of Delegates.

== Recent election results ==
=== 2019 ===
2019 Virginia Senate election, District 34
| Party | Candidate | Votes | % |
|---|---|---|---|
| Democratic | Chap Petersen (incumbent) | 44,058 | 91.2 |
| Total votes | | 48,303 | 100 |
| Democratic hold | | | |

=== 2015 ===
2015 Virginia Senate election, District 34
| Party | Candidate | Votes | % |
|---|---|---|---|
| Democratic | Chap Petersen (incumbent) | 27,690 | 93.6 |
| Total votes | | 29,571 | 100 |
| Democratic hold | | | |

=== 2011 ===
2011 Virginia Senate election, District 34
| Party | Candidate | Votes | % |
|---|---|---|---|
| Democratic | Chap Petersen (incumbent) | 23,662 | 59.7 |
| Republican | Gerarda Culipher | 15,933 | 40.2 |
| Total votes | | 39,620 | 100 |
| Democratic hold | | | |

=== Federal and statewide results ===
| Year | Office | Results |
|---|---|---|
| 2020 | President | Biden 67.6–30.6% |
| 2017 | Governor | Northam 66.6–32.4% |
| 2016 | President | Clinton 63.6–30.1% |
| 2014 | Senate | Warner 55.9–41.9% |
| 2013 | Governor | McAuliffe 56.5–38.1% |
| 2012 | President | Obama 57.4–41.3% |
| 2012 | Senate | Kaine 59.3–40.7% |

== Historical results ==
All election results below took place prior to 2011 redistricting, and thus were under different district lines.

=== 2007 ===
2007 Virginia Senate election, District 34
| Party | Candidate | Votes | % |
|---|---|---|---|
| Democratic | Chap Petersen | 25,513 | 55.3 |
| Republican | Jeannemarie Devolites Davis (incumbent) | 20,490 | 44.4 |
| Total votes | | 46,105 | 100 |
| Democratic gain from Republican | | | |

=== 2003 ===
2003 Virginia Senate election, District 34
Primary election
| Party | Candidate | Votes | % |
|---|---|---|---|
| Republican | Jeannemarie Devolites Davis | 5,240 | 74.9 |
| Republican | L. J. Zone, Jr. | 1,757 | 25.1 |
| Total votes | | 6,997 | 100 |
General election
| Republican | Jeannemarie Devolites Davis | 22,690 | 52.7 |
| Democratic | Ronald Christian | 20,267 | 47.1 |
| Total votes | | 43,015 | 100 |
| Republican gain from Democratic | | | |

=== 1999 ===
1999 Virginia Senate election, District 34
| Party | Candidate | Votes | % |
|---|---|---|---|
| Democratic | Leslie Byrne | 13,719 | 45.5 |
| Republican | Jane Woods (incumbent) | 13,682 | 45.4 |
| Independent | Virginia Dobey | 2,726 | 9.0 |
| Total votes | | 30,140 | 100 |
| Democratic gain from Republican | | | |

=== 1995 ===
1995 Virginia Senate election, District 34
| Party | Candidate | Votes | % |
|---|---|---|---|
| Republican | Jane Woods (incumbent) | 23,389 | 98.8 |
| Total votes | | 23,669 | 100 |
| Republican hold | | | |
