= 1999 Virginia Senate election =

1999 Virginia Senate elections
- November 2, 1999

All 40 seats in the Senate of Virginia 21 seats needed for a majority
- Turnout: 36.1% ▼16.1 pp
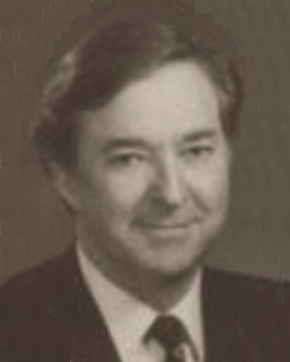

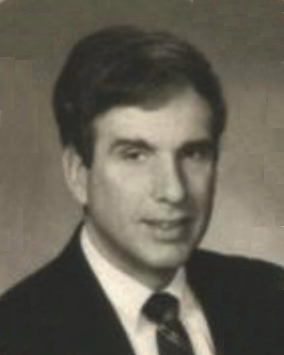
	Majority party	Minority party
Leader	Walter Stosch	Dick Saslaw
Party	Republican	Democratic
Leader since	January 13, 1998	January 10, 1996
Leader's seat	12th	35th
Last election	20 seats, 55.3%	20 seats, 42.0%
Seats won	21	19
Seat change	Steady	Steady
Popular vote	694,231	440,873
Percentage	59.2%	37.6%
Swing	▲3.9 pp	▼4.4 pp
- Results: Democratic hold Democratic gain Republican hold Republican gain
Majority leader before election
Walter Stosch
Republican
Elected Majority leader
Walter Stosch
Republican

The Virginia Senate election of 1999 was held on Tuesday, November 2. Republicans won a 1997 special election to claim a 21-19 majority in the chamber after Democrat Charles L. Waddell resigned his seat. Republicans maintained this majority in 1999, which gave Republicans their first ever elected majority in history.

== Overall results ==
↓
21	19
Republican	Democratic

Parties		Seats				Popular Vote		
Parties		1995	1999	+/-	Strength	Vote	%	Change
	Republican	20	21	▲1	52.50%	694,231		▲
	Democratic	20	19	▼1	47.50%	440,873		▼
	Independent	0	0	Steady	0.00%			
-	Write-ins	0	0	Steady	0.00%			
Total		40	40	0	100.00%		100.00%	-

=== Election results ===
Party abbreviations: D - Democratic, R - Republican, I - Independent, IG - Independent Green, L - Libertarian

District	Incumbent	Party	Elected	Status	2003 Result
1st	Marty Williams	Republican	1995	Reelected	Marty Williams (R) unopposed
2nd	W. Henry Maxwell	Democrat	1993	Reelected	W. Henry Maxwell (D) 80.7% M. A. Rogers, Sr. (I) 19.3%
3rd	Tommy Norment	Republican	1991	Reelected	Tommy Norment (R) 63.0% Lynwood Lewis (D) 37.0%
4th	Bill Bolling	Republican	1995	Reelected	Bill Bolling (R) unopposed
5th	Yvonne Miller	Democrat	1988	Reelected	Yvonne Miller (D) unopposed
6th	Stanley C. Walker	Democrat	1971	Defeated	Nick Rerras (R) 59.3% Stanley C. Walker (D) 40.7%
7th	Ed Schrock	Republican	1995	Reelected	Ed Schrock (R) unopposed
8th	Ken Stolle	Republican	1991	Reelected	Ken Stolle (R) unopposed
9th	Benjamin Lambert	Democrat	1986	Reelected	Benjamin Lambert (D) unopposed
10th	John Watkins	Republican	1998	Reelected	John Watkins (R) 70.0% Alex McMurtrie, Jr. (I) 30.0%
11th	Stephen H. Martin	Republican	1994	Reelected	Stephen H. Martin (R) 64.6% W. S. Hastings, Jr. (D) 35.4%
13th	Fred Quayle	Republican	1991	Reelected	Fred Quayle (R) 76.4% Richard H. Ramsey, Sr. (D) 23.2%
17th	Edd Houck	Democratic	1983	Reelected	Edd Houck (D) 59.5% Robert G. Stuber (R) 40.5%
18th	Louise Lucas	Democrat	1991	Reelected	Louise Lucas (D) 69.8% Walter D Brown, III (R) 30.1%
20th	Roscoe Reynolds	Democratic	1996	Reelected	Roscoe Reynolds (D) 67.8% Thomas L Peterson (R) 32.2%
22nd	Malfourd W. Trumbo	Republican	1991	Reelected	Malfourd W. Trumbo (R) unopposed
23rd	Stephen Newman	Republican	1995	Reelected	Stephen Newman (R) 64.1% Robert E Clarke (D) 35.9%
24th	Emmett Hanger	Republican	1995	Reelected	Emmett Hanger (R) 74.3% Steven Sisson (D) 25.7%<
26th	Kevin G. Miller	Republican	1983	Retired	Mark Obenshain (R) 67.9% Rodney L. Eagle (D) 31.9%
27th	Russ Potts	Republican	1991	Reelected	Russ Potts (R) 58.2% Mark R. Herring (D) 41.1%
29th	Chuck Colgan	Democratic	1975	Reelected	Chuck Colgan (D) 54.7% David C Mabie (R) 45.3%
31st	Mary Margaret Whipple	Democratic	1995	Reelected	Mary Margaret Whipple (D) 69.4% Kamal Nawash (R) 30.3%
32nd	Janet Howell	Democratic	1992	Reelected	Janet Howell (D) 56.7% David Hunt (R) 43.3%
34th	Leslie Byrne	Democrat	1999	Retired	Jeannemarie Devolites (R) 52.8% Ronald F Christian (D) 47.1%
34th	Dick Saslaw	Democratic	1980	Reelected	Dick Saslaw (D) 82.5% C.W. Levy (I) 16.4%
36th	Toddy Puller	Democratic	1999	Reelected	Toddy Puller (D) 55.4% Chris Braunlich (R) 44.5%
37th	Ken Cuccinelli	Republican	2001	Reelected	Ken Cuccinelli (R) 53.3% James E Mitchell, III (D) 46.6%
39th	Jay O'Brien	Republican	2002	Reelected	Jay O'Brien (R) 57.8% Greg Galligan (D) 42.2%

== See also ==
- United States elections, 1999
- Virginia elections, 1999
  - Virginia House of Delegates election, 1999
