= 2003 Virginia elections =

- November 4, 2003

Virginia's 2003 state elections were held on November 4, 2003. Voters elected all 100 members of the Virginia House of Delegates to two-year terms ending in 2006, and all 40 members of the Virginia Senate to four-year terms ending in 2008. There were also elections for local offices (such as Board of Supervisors, Sheriff and Clerk of the Circuit Court) in most counties.

This was the first set of Senate elections since the General Assembly redrew districts as a result of population shifts captured in the decennial federal census. Other than the minor effects of redistricting, there was no unifying theme advanced by either party. Governor Mark Warner did not announce his new fiscal plans for the biennium until after the election, to avoid affecting the General Assembly results. According to the University of Virginia's Center for Politics, the election was "about nothing, almost entirely local affairs and personality-driven, with no mandate generated and no meaning beyond the total of seats gained and lost."

== State Senate ==
Previous to the election, Virginia's Senate consisted of 23 Republicans and 17 Democrats. Republicans picked up one open seat, that of retiring Senator Leslie Byrne, who found her district leaning too far to the right to make a serious effort. This resulted in Republican control of the Senate by a 24 to 16 majority, a post-Civil War low for the Democratic Party.

=== Election results ===
Party abbreviations: D - Democratic, R - Republican, I - Independent, IG - Independent Green, L - Libertarian

Note: Only Senate districts that were contested by more than one candidate are included here.

District	Incumbent	Party	Elected	Status	2003 Result
2nd	W. Henry Maxwell	Democrat	1993	Retired	Mamie Locke (D) 64.8% Phil Bomersheim (R) 24.4% Joyce Hobson (I) 10.7%
3rd	Tommy Norment	Republican	1991	Reelected	Tommy Norment (R) 65.7% Mary Minor (D) 33.9%
6th	Nick Rerras	Republican	1999	Reelected	Nick Rerras (R) 61.7% Andy A. Protogyrou (D) 38.3%
7th	Frank Wagner	Republican	2000	Reelected	Frank Wagner (R) 59.0% Clarence A. Holland (R) 40.6%
13th	Fred Quayle	Republican	1991	Reelected	Fred Quayle (R) 76.4% Richard H. Ramsey Sr. (D) 23.2%
17th	Edd Houck	Democratic	1983	Reelected	Edd Houck (D) 59.5% Robert G. Stuber (R) 40.5%
18th	Louise Lucas	Democrat	1991	Reelected	Louise Lucas (D) 69.8% Walter D Brown, III (R) 30.1%
20th	Roscoe Reynolds	Democratic	1996	Reelected	Roscoe Reynolds (D) 67.8% Thomas L Peterson (R) 32.2%
22nd	Malfourd W. Trumbo	Republican	1991	Retired	J. Brandon Bell (R) 56.8% Stephen H. Emick (D) 43.2%
23rd	Stephen Newman	Republican	1995	Reelected	Stephen Newman (R) 64.1% Robert E Clarke (D) 35.9%
24th	Emmett Hanger	Republican	1995	Reelected	Emmett Hanger (R) 74.3% Steven Sisson (D) 25.7%<
26th	Kevin G. Miller	Republican	1983	Retired	Mark Obenshain (R) 67.9% Rodney L. Eagle (D) 31.9%
27th	Russ Potts	Republican	1991	Reelected	Russ Potts (R) 58.2% Mark R. Herring (D) 41.1%
29th	Chuck Colgan	Democratic	1975	Reelected	Chuck Colgan (D) 54.7% David C Mabie (R) 45.3%
31st	Mary Margaret Whipple	Democratic	1995	Reelected	Mary Margaret Whipple (D) 69.4% Kamal Nawash (R) 30.3%
32nd	Janet Howell	Democratic	1992	Reelected	Janet Howell (D) 56.7% David Hunt (R) 43.3%
34th	Leslie Byrne	Democrat	1999	Retired	Jeannemarie Devolites (R) 52.8% Ronald F Christian (D) 47.1%
35th	Dick Saslaw	Democratic	1980	Reelected	Dick Saslaw (D) 82.5% C.W. Levy (I) 16.4%
36th	Toddy Puller	Democratic	1999	Reelected	Toddy Puller (D) 55.4% Chris Braunlich (R) 44.5%
37th	Ken Cuccinelli	Republican	2001	Reelected	Ken Cuccinelli (R) 53.3% James E Mitchell, III (D) 46.6%
39th	Jay O'Brien	Republican	2002	Reelected	Jay O'Brien (R) 57.8% Greg Galligan (D) 42.2%

== House of Delegates ==
Previous to the election, Republicans controlled the House of Delegates with 64 seats, compared to the Democrats' 34 seats, and two seats held by Republican-leaning Independents. Democrats won four seats from the Republicans, defeating one incumbent and taking three open seats, while one Republican took an open seat previously held by a Democrat, making the post-election composition of the House 61 Republicans, 37 Democrats, and 2 Independents.
