= 2019 Virginia Senate election =

- November 5, 2019

All 40 seats in the Senate of Virginia 21 (Note: A majority of 20 is also possible as the Lt. Gov. of Virginia holds a tie-breaker vote.) seats needed for a majority
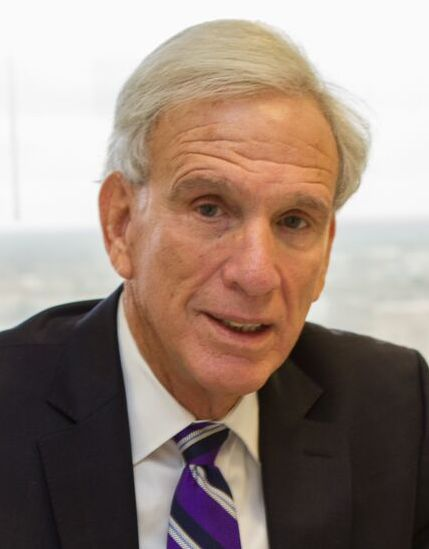

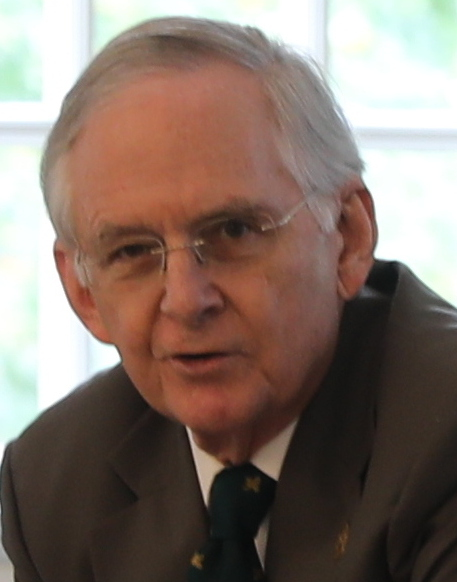
	Majority party	Minority party
Leader	Dick Saslaw	Tommy Norment
Party	Democratic	Republican
Leader since	January 10, 1996	January 9, 2008
Leader's seat	35th - Springfield	3rd - Williamsburg
Last election	19	21
Seats won	21	19
Seat change	▲2	▼2
Popular vote	1,211,835	907,477
Percentage	53.2%	39.8%
Swing	▲9.5%	▼12.8%
- Democratic hold Democratic gain Republican hold Democratic: 50-60% 60-70% 70-80% 80-90% 90-100% Republican: 50-60% 60-70% 70-80% 90-100%
Majority leader before election
Tommy Norment
Republican
Elected Majority leader
Dick Saslaw
Democratic

The 2019 Virginia Senate election was held on November 5, 2019, concurrently with the House election, to elect members to all 40 seats in the Senate of Virginia for the 161st Virginia General Assembly and the 162nd Virginia General Assembly. Primaries were held on June 11. The elections resulted in Democrats gaining 2 seats in the senate, and gaining control of both chambers of the General Assembly, marking the first time that Democrats held control of both legislative and executive branches in Virginia since 1993.

== Overall results ==
↓
21	19
Democratic	Republican

Parties		Candidates	Seats				Popular Vote		
Parties		Candidates	2015	2019	+/-	Strength	Vote	%	Change
	Democratic		19	21	▲2	52.50%	1,211,835	53.19%	+9.44
	Republican		21	19	▼2	47.50%	907,477	39.83%	-12.74
	Independent		0	0	Steady	0.00%	101,118	4.44%	+3.51
-	Write-ins		0	0	Steady	0.00%	46,004	2.02%	+0.39
	Libertarian		0	0	Steady	0.00%	11,703	0.51%	+0.47
Total			40	40	0	100.00%	2,278,137	100.00%	-

=== Close races ===
Seats where the margin of victory was under 10%:

1. Senate District 7, 0.86%
2. Senate District 12, 1.71%
3. Senate District 17, 3.47%
4. Senate District 8, 4.35%
5. Senate District 10, 8.11% gain
6. Senate District 13, 8.61% gain
7. Senate District 11, 9.25%

== Predictions ==
Source	Ranking	As of
Sabato	Lean D (flip)	October 31, 2019

== Results ==
District	Incumbent	Party	Elected Senator	Party
1	Monty Mason	Dem	Monty Mason (Note: Uncontested by any named candidate.)	Dem
2	Mamie Locke	Dem	Mamie Locke	Dem
3	Tommy Norment	Rep	Tommy Norment	Rep
4	Ryan McDougle	Rep	Ryan McDougle	Rep
5	Lionell Spruill	Dem	Lionell Spruill	Dem
6	Lynwood Lewis	Dem	Lynwood Lewis	Dem
7	Vacant (Note: Incumbent Republican Frank Wagner resigned in May 2019 to take the position of Deputy Director of the Virginia Lottery. The seat remained vacant until January 2020.)		Jen Kiggans	Rep
8	Bill DeSteph	Rep	Bill DeSteph	Rep
9	Jennifer McClellan	Dem	Jennifer McClellan	Dem
10	Glen Sturtevant	Rep	Ghazala Hashmi (Note: The first Muslim woman elected to state senate.)	Dem
11	Amanda Chase	Rep	Amanda Chase	Rep
12	Siobhan Dunnavant	Rep	Siobhan Dunnavant	Rep
13	Dick Black	Rep	John Bell	Dem
14	John Cosgrove	Rep	John Cosgrove	Rep
15	Frank Ruff	Rep	Frank Ruff	Rep
16	Rosalyn Dance	Dem	Joe Morrissey	Dem
17	Bryce Reeves	Rep	Bryce Reeves	Rep
18	Louise Lucas	Dem	Louise Lucas	Dem
19	David Suetterlein	Rep	David Suetterlein	Rep
20	Bill Stanley	Rep	Bill Stanley	Rep
21	John Edwards	Dem	John Edwards	Dem
22	Mark Peake	Rep	Mark Peake	Rep
23	Stephen Newman	Rep	Stephen Newman	Rep
24	Emmett Hanger	Rep	Emmett Hanger	Rep
25	Creigh Deeds	Dem	Creigh Deeds	Dem
26	Mark Obenshain	Rep	Mark Obenshain	Rep
27	Jill Vogel	Rep	Jill Vogel	Rep
28	Richard Stuart	Rep	Richard Stuart	Rep
29	Jeremy McPike	Dem	Jeremy McPike	Dem
30	Adam Ebbin	Dem	Adam Ebbin	Dem
31	Barbara Favola	Dem	Barbara Favola	Dem
32	Janet Howell	Dem	Janet Howell	Dem
33	Jennifer Boysko	Dem	Jennifer Boysko	Dem
34	Chap Petersen	Dem	Chap Petersen	Dem
35	Dick Saslaw	Dem	Dick Saslaw	Dem
36	Scott Surovell	Dem	Scott Surovell	Dem
37	Dave Marsden	Dem	Dave Marsden	Dem
38	Ben Chafin	Rep	Ben Chafin	Rep
39	George Barker	Dem	George Barker	Dem
40	Charles William Carrico Sr.	Rep	Todd Pillion	Rep

== Retiring incumbents ==
Three incumbent Senators, all Republicans, decided not to seek reelection:

- Frank Wagner (R), District 7 (Subsequently resigned in May 2019)
- Dick Black (R), District 13
- Charles William Carrico Sr. (R), District 40

== Incumbents defeated ==
=== In primary election ===
One incumbent senator, a Democrat, was defeated in the June 11 primary election.

- Rosalyn Dance (D), District 16

=== In general election ===
One incumbent senator, a Republican, was defeated in the November 5th general election.

- Glen Sturtevant, District 10

== Detailed results ==
- Uncontested primaries are not reported by the Virginia Department of Elections.

=== District 1 ===
2021 Virginia Senate 1st District election
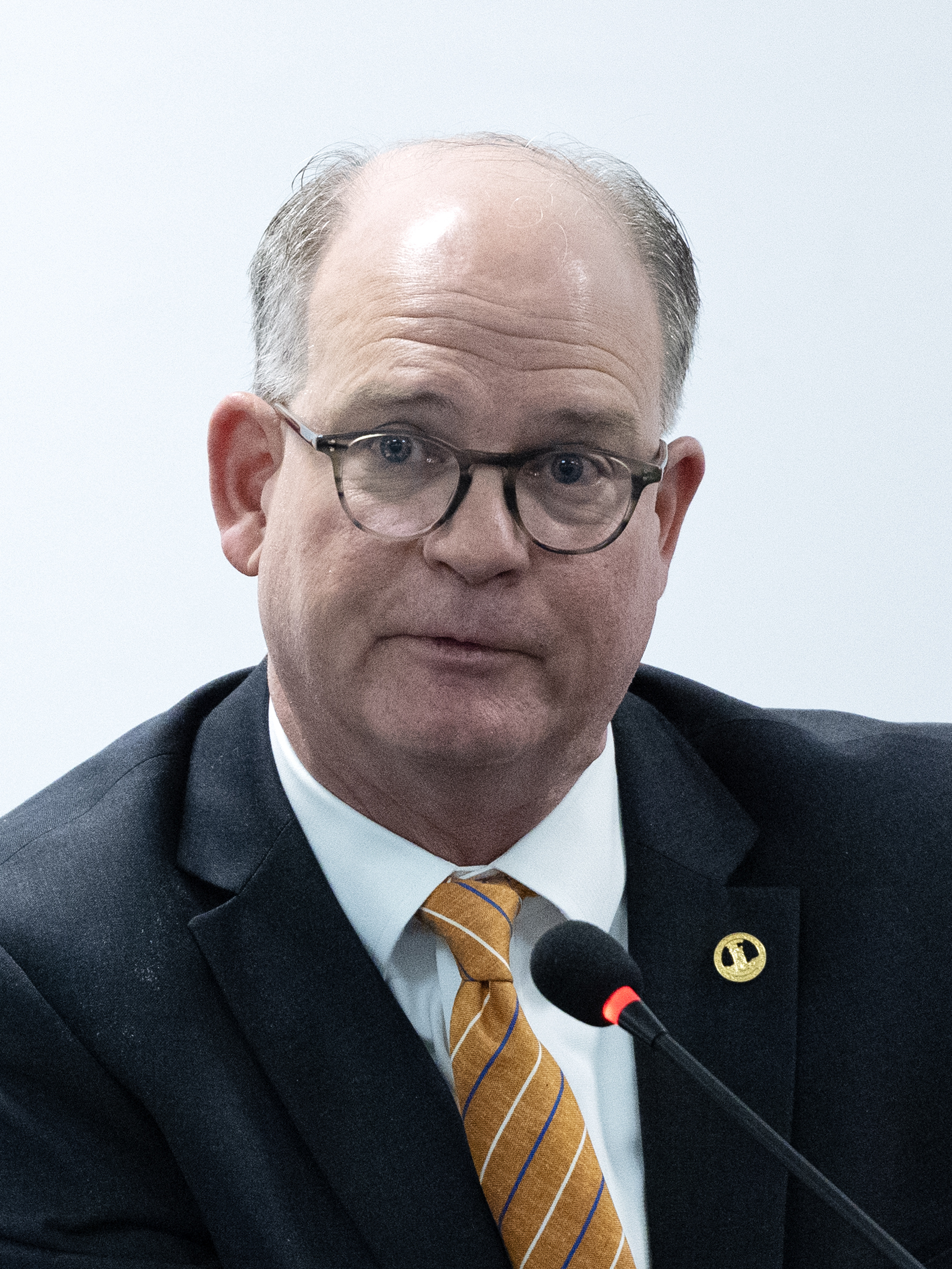

Candidate	Monty Mason
Party	Democratic	Write-ins
Popular vote	36,844	4,173
Percentage	89.83%	10.17%
State senator before election
Monty Mason
Democratic
Elected State senator
Monty Mason
Democratic

Incumbent Democrat Monty Mason has represented the 1st District since 2017.

==== General election ====
Virginia's 1st Senate district general election, 2019
Party	Candidate	Votes	%
Democratic	Monty Mason (incumbent)	36,844	89.83%
Write-ins	Write-ins	4,173	10.17%
Total votes		41,017	100%
Democratic hold			

=== District 2 ===
Incumbent Democrat Mamie Locke has represented the 2nd district since 2004.

==== General election ====
Virginia's 2nd Senate district general election, 2019
Party	Candidate	Votes	%
Democratic	Mamie Locke (incumbent)	36,520	92.79%
Write-ins	Write-ins	2,838	7.21%
Total votes		39,358	100%
Democratic hold			

=== District 3 ===
Incumbent Republican and current Majority Leader Tommy Norment has represented the 3rd district since 1992.

==== General election ====
Virginia's 3rd Senate district general election, 2019
Party	Candidate	Votes	%
Republican	Tommy Norment (incumbent)	50,434	61.69%
Democratic	Herb Jones	31,043	37.97%
Write-ins	Write-ins	271	0.33%
Total votes		81,748	100%
Republican hold			

=== District 4 ===
Incumbent Republican Ryan McDougle has represented the 4th district since 2006.

==== General election ====
Virginia's 4th Senate district general election, 2019
Party	Candidate	Votes	%
Republican	Ryan McDougle (incumbent)	45,682	63.01%
Democratic	Stan Scott	26,646	36.75%
Write-ins	Write-ins	173	0.2%
Total votes		72,501	100%
Republican hold			

=== District 5 ===
Incumbent Democrat Lionell Spruill has represented the 5th district since 2017.

==== General election ====
Virginia's 5th Senate district general election, 2019
Party	Candidate	Votes	%
Democratic	Lionell Spruill (incumbent)	31,222	79.38%
Independent	Jeff Staples	7,663	19.48%
Write-ins	Write-ins	448	1.14%
Total votes		39,333	100%
Democratic hold			

=== District 6 ===
Incumbent Democrat Lynwood Lewis has represented the 6th district since a 2014 special election.

==== Democratic primary ====
6th District Democratic primary election
Party	Candidate	Votes	%
Democratic	Lynwood Lewis (incumbent)	4,559	70.6%
Democratic	Willie Randall	1,899	29.4%
Democratic	Write-ins	1	0.0%
Total votes		6,459	100%

==== General election ====
Virginia's 6th Senate district general election, 2019
Party	Candidate	Votes	%
Democratic	Lynwood Lewis (incumbent)	25,755	59.65%
Republican	Elizabeth Lankford	17,351	40.19%
Write-ins	Write-ins	69	0.16%
Total votes		43,175	100%
Democratic hold			

=== District 7 ===
The seat has been vacant since May 2019 when incumbent Republican Frank Wagner (who had already announced his intention not to seek reelection) resigned to take the position as deputy director of the Virginia Lottery.

==== Republican primary ====
7th District Republican primary election
Party	Candidate	Votes	%
Republican	Jen Kiggans	4,045	51.6%
Republican	Carolyn Dale Weems	3,789	48.4%
Republican	Write-ins	2	0.0%
Total votes		7,836	100%

==== Democratic primary ====
7th District Democratic primary election
Party	Candidate	Votes	%
Democratic	Cheryl Turpin	3,268	58.7%
Democratic	Susan Bates Hippin	1,531	27.5%
Democratic	Kim Howard	761	13.7%
Democratic	Write-ins	6	0.1%
Total votes		5,566	100%

==== General election ====
Virginia's 7th Senate district general election, 2019
Party	Candidate	Votes	%
Republican	Jen Kiggans	29,609	50.36%
Democratic	Cheryl Turpin	29,098	49.49%
Write-ins	Write-ins	91	0.15%
Total votes		58,754	100%
Republican hold			

=== District 8 ===
Incumbent Republican Bill DeSteph has represented the 8th district since 2016.

==== General election ====
Virginia's 8th Senate district general election, 2019
Party	Candidate	Votes	%
Republican	Bill DeSteph (incumbent)	28,622	52.10%
Democratic	Missy Cotter Smasal	26,229	47.75%
Write-ins	Write-ins	81	0.15%
Total votes		54,932	100%
Republican hold			

=== District 9 ===
2019 Virginia Senate 9th District election
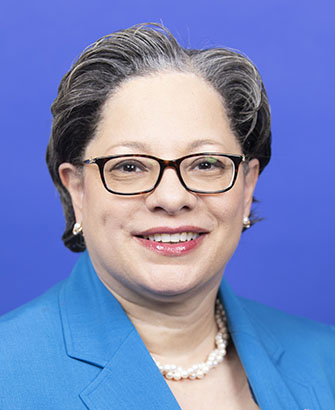

Candidate	Jennifer McClellan	Mark Lewis Jr.
Party	Democratic	Libertarian
Popular vote	49,652	11,703
Percentage	80.18%	18.90%
- Results by county/independent city : McClellan: 50–60%; 60–70%; 70–80%; 80–90%
State senator before election
Jennifer McClellan
Democratic
Elected State senator
Jennifer McClellan
Democratic

Incumbent Democrat Jennifer McClellan has represented the 9th district since a 2017 special election.

==== General election ====
Virginia's 9th Senate district general election, 2019
Party	Candidate	Votes	%
Democratic	Jennifer McClellan (incumbent)	49,652	80.18%
Libertarian	Mark Lewis Jr.	11,703	18.90%
Write-ins	Write-ins	568	0.92%
Total votes		61,923	100%
Democratic hold			

=== District 10 ===
2021 Virginia Senate 10th District election
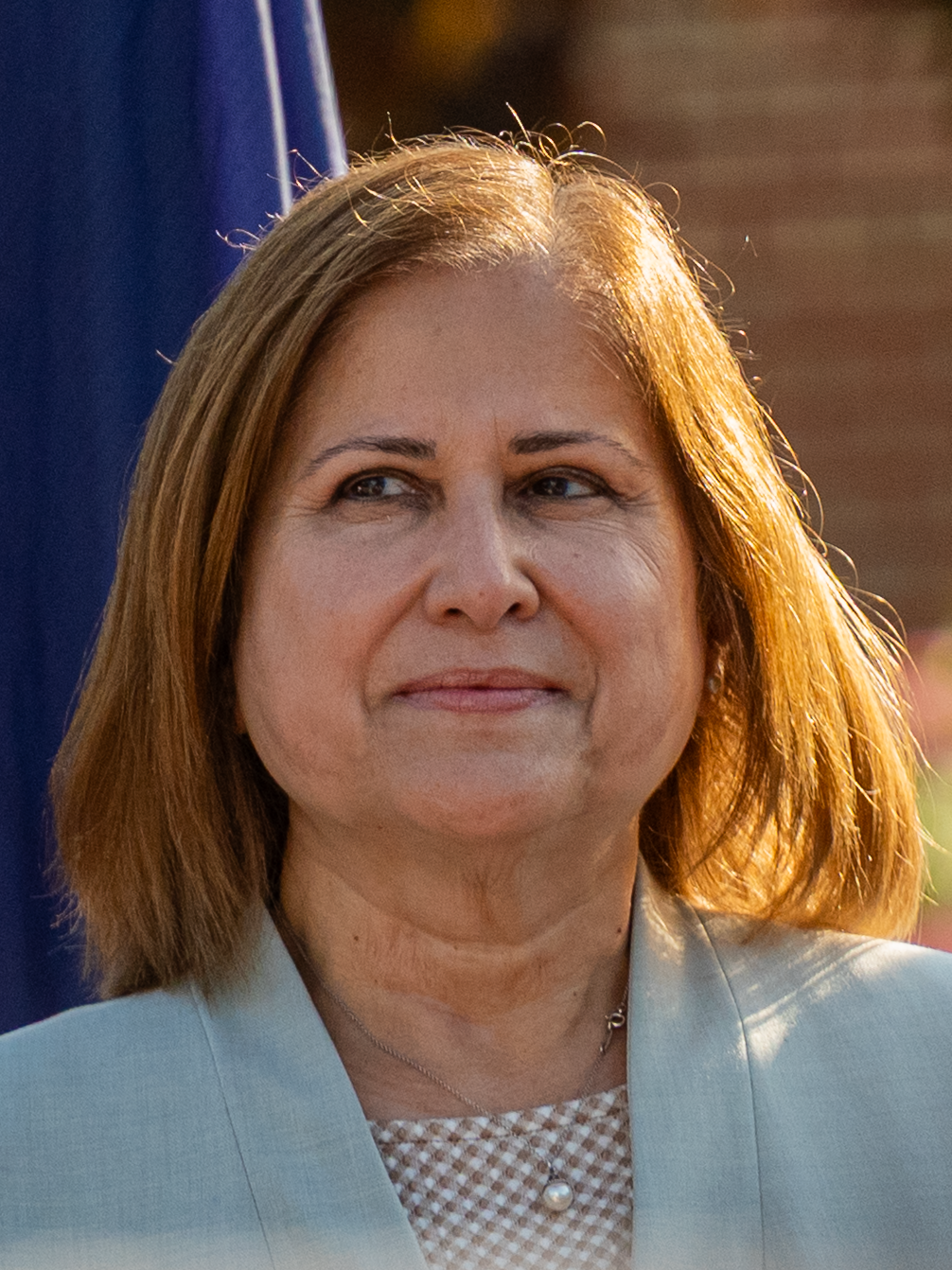

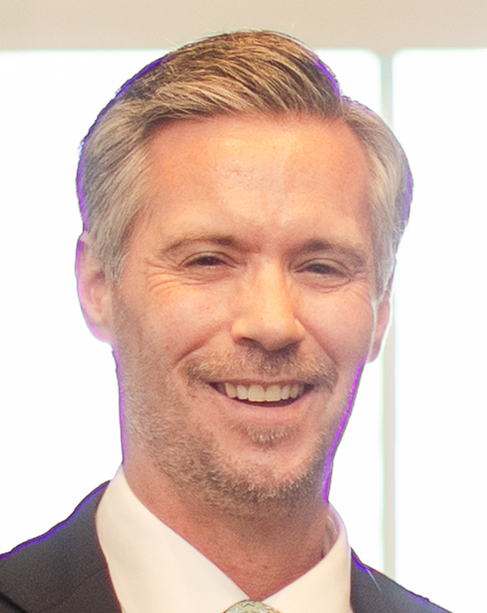
Candidate	Ghazala Hashmi	Glen Sturtevant
Party	Democratic	Republican
Popular vote	44,286	37,636
Percentage	54.00%	45.89%
- Results by county/independent city : Hashmi: 70–80%; Sturtevant: 50–60%; 70–80%
State senator before election
Glen Sturtevant
Republican
Elected State senator
Ghazala Hashmi
Democratic

Incumbent Republican Glen Sturtevant has represented the 10th district since 2016.

==== Democratic primary ====
10th District Democratic primary election
Party	Candidate	Votes	%
Democratic	Ghazala Hashmi	5,246	49.4%
Democratic	Eileen Bedell	4,347	40.9%
Democratic	Zachary Parks Brown	1,032	9.7%
Democratic	Write-ins	2	0.0%
Total votes		10,627	100%

==== General election ====
Virginia's 10th Senate district general election, 2019
Party	Candidate	Votes	%
Democratic	Ghazala Hashmi	44,286	54.00%
Republican	Glen Sturtevant (incumbent)	37,636	45.89%
Write-ins	Write-ins	84	0.10%
Total votes		82,006	100%
Democratic gain from Republican			

=== District 11 ===
Incumbent Republican Amanda Chase has represented the 11th district since 2016.

==== Democratic primary ====
11th District Democratic primary election
Party	Candidate	Votes	%
Democratic	Amanda Pohl	6,241	78.1%
Democratic	Ernest Powell	1,747	20.9%
Democratic	Write-ins	5	0.1%
Total votes		7,993	100%

==== General election ====
Results by county/independent city Chase: 50–60%; 70–80%

Virginia's 11th Senate district general election, 2019
Party	Candidate	Votes	%
Republican	Amanda Chase (incumbent)	44,245	54.51%
Democratic	Amanda Pohl	36,734	45.26%
Write-ins	Write-ins	189	0.23%
Total votes		81,113	100%
Republican hold			

=== District 12 ===
Incumbent Republican Siobhan Dunnavant has represented the 12th district since 2016.

==== Democratic primary ====
12th District Democratic primary election
Party	Candidate	Votes	%
Democratic	Debra Rodman	7,051	60.0%
Democratic	Veena Lothe	4,705	40.0%
Democratic	Write-ins	2	0.0%
Total votes		11,758	100%

==== General election ====
County results Dunnavant: 60–70%; Rodman: 50–60%

Virginia's 12th Senate district general election, 2019
Party	Candidate	Votes	%
Republican	Siobhan Dunnavant (incumbent)	39,703	50.76%
Democratic	Debra Rodman	38,365	49.05%
Write-ins	Write-ins	143	0.18%
Total votes		78,211	100%
Republican hold			

=== District 13 ===
Incumbent Republican Dick Black has represented the 13th district since 2012. He is not running for reelection.

==== Republican primary ====
13th District Republican primary election
Party	Candidate	Votes	%
Republican	Geary Higgins	6,609	65.3%
Republican	Ronald Meyer Jr.	3,486	34.5%
Republican	Write-ins	21	0.2%
Total votes		10,116	100%

==== General election ====
Virginia's 13th Senate district general election, 2019
Party	Candidate	Votes	%
Democratic	John Bell	44,729	54.25%
Republican	Geary Higgins	37,629	45.64%
Write-ins	Write-ins	95	0.12%
Total votes		82,453	100%
Democratic gain from Republican			

=== District 14 ===
Incumbent Republican John Cosgrove has represented the 14th district since a 2013 special election.

==== General election ====
Virginia's 14th Senate district general election, 2019
Party	Candidate	Votes	%
Republican	John Cosgrove (incumbent)	36,369	60.16%
Democratic	Rebecca Raveson	23,948	39.61%
Write-ins	Write-ins	141	0.23%
Total votes		60,458	100%
Republican hold			

=== District 15 ===
Incumbent Republican Frank Ruff has represented the 15th district since a 2000 special election.

==== Republican primary ====
15th District Republican primary election
Party	Candidate	Votes	%
Republican	Frank Ruff (incumbent)	8,235	79.4%
Republican	Dale Sturdifen	2,132	20.6%
Republican	Write-ins	1	0.0%
Total votes		10,368	100%

==== General election ====
Virginia's 15th Senate district general election, 2019
Party	Candidate	Votes	%
Republican	Frank Ruff (incumbent)	38,470	68.30%
Democratic	Virginia Smith	17,793	31.59%
Write-ins	Write-ins	63	0.11%
Total votes		56,326	100%
Republican hold			

=== District 16 ===
Incumbent Democrat Rosalyn Dance has represented the 16th district since a 2014 special election. She was defeated in the June 11 primary election.

==== Democratic primary ====
Results by county/independent city Morrissey: 50–60%; 60–70%; 70–80%; Dance: 50–60%

16th District Democratic primary election
Party	Candidate	Votes	%
Democratic	Joe Morrissey	8,741	56.0%
Democratic	Rosalyn Dance (incumbent)	6,873	44.0%
Democratic	Write-ins	6	0.0%
Total votes		15,620	100%

==== General election ====
Results by county/independent city Morrissey: 50–60%; 70–80%; 80–90%

Virginia's 16th Senate district general election, 2019
Party	Candidate	Votes	%
Democratic	Joe Morrissey	29,401	63.96%
Independent	Waylin Ross	15,722	34.20%
Write-ins	Write-ins	848	1.84%
Total votes		45,971	100%
Democratic hold			

=== District 17 ===
Incumbent Republican Bryce Reeves has represented the 17th district since 2012.

==== Republican primary ====
17th District Republican primary election
Party	Candidate	Votes	%
Republican	Bryce Reeves (incumbent)	6,325	82.3%
Republican	Richard Breeden	1,359	17.7%
Republican	Write-ins	1	0.0%
Total votes		7,685	100%

==== Democratic primary ====
17th District Democratic primary election
Party	Candidate	Votes	%
Democratic	Amy Laufer	6,042	78.2%
Democratic	Ben Hixon	1,672	21.7%
Democratic	Write-ins	1	0.0%
Total votes		7,722	100%

==== General election ====
Results by county/independent city Reeves: 50–60%; 60–70%; Laufer: 60–70%

Virginia's 17th Senate district general election, 2019
Party	Candidate	Votes	%
Republican	Bryce Reeves (incumbent)	34,483	51.58%
Democratic	Amy Laufer	32,162	48.11%
Write-ins	Write-ins	208	0.31%
Total votes		66,853	100%
Republican hold			

=== District 18 ===
Incumbent Democrat Louise Lucas has represented the 18th district since 1992.

==== General election ====
Virginia's 18th Senate district general election, 2019
Party	Candidate	Votes	%
Democratic	Louise Lucas (incumbent)	43,015	92.49%
Write-ins	Write-ins	3,492	7.51%
Total votes		46,507	100%
Democratic hold			

=== District 19 ===
Incumbent Republican David Suetterlein has represented the 19th district since 2016.

==== General election ====
Virginia's 19th Senate district general election, 2019
Party	Candidate	Votes	%
Republican	David Suetterlein (incumbent)	41,279	71.42%
Democratic	Flourette Ketner	16,469	28.50%
Write-ins	Write-ins	47	0.08%
Total votes		57,795	100%
Republican hold			

=== District 20 ===
Incumbent Republican Bill Stanley has represented the 20th district since 2012.

==== General election ====
Virginia's 20th Senate district general election, 2019
Party	Candidate	Votes	%
Republican	Bill Stanley (incumbent)	32,527	70.52%
Independent	Sherman Witcher Sr.	13,394	29.04%
Write-ins	Write-ins	204	0.44%
Total votes		46,125	100%
Republican hold			

=== District 21 ===
Incumbent Democrat John Edwards has represented the 21st district since 1996.

Results by county/independent city Edwards: 50–60%; 70–80%; Nelson: 50–60%

==== General election ====
Virginia's 21st Senate district general election, 2019
Party	Candidate	Votes	%
Democratic	John Edwards (incumbent)	26,872	65.47%
Independent	Steven Nelson	13,881	33.82%
Write-ins	Write-ins	289	0.70%
Total votes		41,042	100%
Democratic hold			

=== District 22 ===
Incumbent Republican Mark Peake has represented the 22nd district since a 2017 special election.

==== General election ====
Virginia's 22nd Senate district general election, 2019
Party	Candidate	Votes	%
Republican	Mark Peake (incumbent)	37,620	62.76%
Democratic	Dakota Claytor	22,250	37.12%
Write-ins	Write-ins	75	0.13%
Total votes		59,945	100%
Republican hold			

=== District 23 ===
Incumbent Republican Stephen Newman has represented the 23rd district since 1996.

==== General election ====
Virginia's 23rd Senate district general election, 2019
Party	Candidate	Votes	%
Republican	Stephen Newman (incumbent)	47,372	93.86%
Write-ins	Write-ins	3,100	6.14%
Total votes		50,472	100%
Republican hold			

=== District 24 ===
Incumbent Republican Emmett Hanger has represented the 24th district since 1996.

==== Republican primary ====
Results by county/independent city Hanger: 50–60%; 60–70%; 70–80%; Freitas: 50–60%; 60–70%; 70–80%

24th District Republican primary election
Party	Candidate	Votes	%
Republican	Emmett Hanger (incumbent)	11,146	57.6%
Republican	Tina Freitas	8,216	42.4%
Republican	Write-ins	1	0.0%
Total votes		19,363	100%

==== General election ====
Results by county/independent city Hanger: 50–60%; 60–70%; 70–80%

Virginia's 24th Senate district general election, 2019
Party	Candidate	Votes	%
Republican	Emmett Hanger (incumbent)	46,875	71.03%
Democratic	Annette Hyde	18,725	28.37%
Write-ins	Write-ins	397	0.60%
Total votes		65,997	100%
Republican hold			

=== District 25 ===
Incumbent Democrat Creigh Deeds has represented the 25th district since a 2001 special election.

==== General election ====
Results by county/independent city Deeds: 50–60%; 60–70%; 70–80%; 80–90%; Harding: 50–60%

Virginia's 25th Senate district general election, 2019
Party	Candidate	Votes	%
Democratic	Creigh Deeds (incumbent)	44,741	67.48%
Independent	Elliott Harding	21,316	32.15%
Write-ins	Write-ins	246	0.37%
Total votes		66,303	100%
Democratic hold			

=== District 26 ===
Incumbent Republican Mark Obenshain has represented the 26th district since a 2004 special election.

==== General election ====
Virginia's 26th Senate district general election, 2019
Party	Candidate	Votes	%
Republican	Mark Obenshain (incumbent)	36,991	64.89%
Democratic	April Moore	19,944	34.98%
Write-ins	Write-ins	75	0.13%
Total votes		57,010	100%
Republican hold			

=== District 27 ===
Incumbent Republican Jill Vogel has represented the 27th district since 2008.

==== General election ====
Results by county/independent city Vogel: 50–60%; 60–70%; 70–80%; Ross: 50–60%

Virginia's 27th Senate district general election, 2019
Party	Candidate	Votes	%
Republican	Jill Vogel (incumbent)	43,406	64.21%
Democratic	Ronnie Ross III	24,128	35.69%
Write-ins	Write-ins	65	0.10%
Total votes		67,599	100%
Republican hold			

=== District 28 ===
Incumbent Republican Richard Stuart has represented the 28th district since 2008.

==== Democratic primary ====
28th District Democratic primary election
Party	Candidate	Votes	%
Democratic	Qasim Rashid	3,302	59.1%
Democratic	Laura Ann Sellers	2,256	40.4%
Democratic	Write-ins	25	0.4%
Total votes		5,583	100%

==== General election ====
Virginia's 28th Senate district general election, 2019
Party	Candidate	Votes	%
Republican	Richard Stuart (incumbent)	40,182	57.45%
Democratic	Qasim Rashid	29,681	42.44%
Write-ins	Write-ins	80	0.11%
Total votes		69,943	100%
Republican hold			

=== District 29 ===
Incumbent Democrat Jeremy McPike has represented the 29th district since 2016.

==== General election ====
Virginia's 29th Senate district general election, 2019
Party	Candidate	Votes	%
Democratic	Jeremy McPike (incumbent)	35,125	91.10%
Write-ins	Write-ins	3,433	8.90%
Total votes		38,558	100%
Democratic hold			

=== District 30 ===
Incumbent Democrat Adam Ebbin has represented the 30th district since 2012.

==== General election ====
Virginia's 30th Senate district general election, 2019
Party	Candidate	Votes	%
Democratic	Adam Ebbin (incumbent)	42,809	91.66%
Write-ins	Write-ins	3,894	8.34%
Total votes		46,703	100%
Democratic hold			

=== District 31 ===
Incumbent Democrat Barbara Favola has represented the 31st district since 2012.

==== Democratic primary ====
31st District Democratic primary election
Party	Candidate	Votes	%
Democratic	Barbara Favola (incumbent)	12,036	61.9%
Democratic	Nicole Merlene	7,416	38.1%
Total votes		19,452	100%

==== General election ====
Virginia's 31st Senate district general election, 2019
Party	Candidate	Votes	%
Democratic	Barbara Favola (incumbent)	46,644	91.63%
Write-ins	Write-ins	4,260	8.37%
Total votes		50,904	100%
Democratic hold			

=== District 32 ===
Incumbent Democrat Janet Howell has represented the 32nd district since 1992.

==== General election ====
Virginia's 32nd Senate district general election, 2019
Party	Candidate	Votes	%
Democratic	Janet Howell (incumbent)	48,546	73.58%
Republican	Arthur Purves	17,303	26.23%
Write-ins	Write-ins	127	0.19%
Total votes		65,976	100%
Democratic hold			

=== District 33 ===
Incumbent Democrat Jennifer Boysko has represented the 33rd district since a 2019 special election.

==== Democratic primary ====
33rd District Democratic primary election
Party	Candidate	Votes	%
Democratic	Jennifer Boysko (incumbent)	8,268	84.3%
Democratic	Mohammad Hussein	1,540	15.7%
Democratic	Write-ins	3	0.0%
Total votes		9,811	100%

==== General election ====
Virginia's 33rd Senate district general election, 2019
Party	Candidate	Votes	%
Democratic	Jennifer Boysko (incumbent)	34,492	64.89%
Republican	Suzanne Fox	18,602	35.00%
Write-ins	Write-ins	57	0.11%
Total votes		53,151	100%
Democratic hold			

=== District 34 ===
Incumbent Democrat Chap Petersen has represented the 34th district since 2008.

==== General election ====
Virginia's 34th Senate district general election, 2019
Party	Candidate	Votes	%
Democratic	Chap Petersen (incumbent)	43,993	91.20%
Write-ins	Write-ins	4,246	8.80%
Total votes		48,239	100%
Democratic hold			

=== District 35 ===
Incumbent Democrat and current Minority Leader Dick Saslaw has represented the 35th district since 1980.

==== Democratic primary ====
35th District Democratic primary election
Party	Candidate	Votes	%
Democratic	Dick Saslaw (incumbent)	7,381	48.6%
Democratic	Yasmine Taeb	6,945	45.8%
Democratic	Karen Torrent	853	5.6%
Total votes		15,179	100%

==== General election ====
Virginia's 35th Senate district general election, 2019
Party	Candidate	Votes	%
Democratic	Dick Saslaw (incumbent)	35,101	92.49%
Write-ins	Write-ins	2,849	7.51%
Total votes		37,950	100%
Democratic hold			

=== District 36 ===
Incumbent Democrat Scott Surovell has represented the 36th district since 2016.

==== General election ====
Virginia's 36th Senate district general election, 2019
Party	Candidate	Votes	%
Democratic	Scott Surovell (incumbent)	37,492	91.73%
Write-ins	Write-ins	3,382	8.27%
Total votes		40,874	100%
Democratic hold			

=== District 37 ===
Incumbent Democrat Dave Marsden has represented the 37th district since a 2010 special election.

==== General election ====
Virginia's 37th Senate district general election, 2019
Party	Candidate	Votes	%
Democratic	Dave Marsden (incumbent)	41,203	90.27%
Write-ins	Write-ins	4,439	9.73%
Total votes		45,642	100%
Democratic hold			

=== District 38 ===
Incumbent Republican Ben Chafin has represented the 38th district since a 2014 special election.

==== General election ====
Virginia's 38th Senate district general election, 2019
Party	Candidate	Votes	%
Republican	Ben Chafin (incumbent)	30,288	63.52%
Independent	George McCall III	16,871	35.37%
Write-ins	Write-ins	521	1.09%
Total votes		47,680	100%
Republican hold			

=== District 39 ===
Incumbent Democrat George Barker has represented the 39th district since 2008.

==== General election ====
Virginia's 39th Senate district general election, 2019
Party	Candidate	Votes	%
Democratic	George Barker (incumbent)	40,230	65.79%
Republican	Dutch Hillenburg	20,843	34.08%
Write-ins	Write-ins	79	0.13%
Total votes		61,152	100%
Democratic hold			

=== District 40 ===
Incumbent Republican Charles William Carrico Sr. has represented the 40th district since 2012. He did not run for reelection.

==== General election ====
Virginia's 40th Senate district general election, 2019
Party	Candidate	Votes	%
Republican	Todd Pillion	40,122	76.34%
Independent	Ken Heath	12,271	23.35%
Write-ins	Write-ins	164	0.31%
Total votes		52,557	100%
Republican hold			

== Polling ==
Poll source	Date(s) administered	Sample size	Margin of error	Republican	Democrat	Other	Undecided
Wason Center	October 28, 2019	849	± 3.8%	29%	42%	12%	7%
Roanoke College	August 1–5, 2019	519	± 4.3%	31%	36%	33%	

== See also ==
- 2019 Virginia House of Delegates election
- 2019 Virginia elections
- List of Virginia state legislatures
