= Senator Tyler (disambiguation) =

John Tyler (1790–1862) was a U.S. Senator from Virginia from 1827 to 1836. Senator Tyler may also refer to:

- David Gardiner Tyler (1846–1927), Virginia State Senate
- James Hoge Tyler III (1910–1988), Virginia State Senate
- John Tyler (doctor) (1763–1841), Maryland State Senate
