= John H. Catron =

American politician

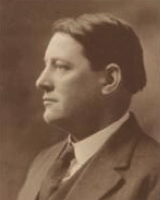

Member of the Virginia Senate from the 2nd district
- In office January 10, 1912 – January 12, 1916
- Preceded by: John C. Noel
- Succeeded by: John M. Goodloe

Personal details
- Born: John Henry Catron; September 7, 1865 Hancock County, Tennessee, U.S.
- Died: March 29, 1926 (aged 60) Abingdon, Virginia, U.S.
- Party: Republican
- Other political affiliations: Progressive (1915)
- Spouse: Margaret Cosby Darnell

John Henry Catron (September 7, 1865 – March 29, 1926) was an American Republican politician who served as a member of the Virginia Senate, representing the state's 2nd district.

In 1915, he ran for reelection to the senate as a Progressive but lost a three-way race to Republican John M. Goodloe.

Senate of Virginia
| Preceded by John C. Noel | Virginia Senator for the 2nd District; 1912–1916 | Succeeded by John M. Goodloe |
