= Senator Pendleton =

Senator Pendleton may refer to:

== Members of the United States Senate ==
- Florence Pendleton (1926–2020), shadow U.S. Senator from the District of Columbia from 1991 to 2007
- George H. Pendleton (1825–1889), U.S. Senator from Ohio from 1879 to 1885

== United States state senate members ==
- Charles S. Pendleton (1880–1952), Virginia State Senate
- Joey Pendleton (born 1946), Kentucky State Senate
- Nathanael G. Pendleton (1793–1861), Ohio State Senate
- Peggy Pendleton (born 1946), Maine State Senate
