= Charles Pendleton =

Charles Pendleton may refer to:

- Charles F. Pendleton (1931–1953), U.S. Army soldier and Medal of Honor recipient
- Charles S. Pendleton (1880–1952), American politician in Virginia
