= Senator Goodloe =

Senator Goodloe may refer to:

- John M. Goodloe (1858–1942), Virginia State Senate
- William C. Goodloe (1914–1997), Washington State Senate
