= J. Frank Sergent =

American politician (1868–1956)

Member of the Virginia Senate from the 2nd district
- In office January 11, 1922 – January 9, 1924
- Preceded by: Charles S. Pendleton
- Succeeded by: John A. Lesner; James S. Barron

Personal details
- Born: John Franklin Sergent; December 6, 1868 Scott County, Virginia, U.S.
- Died: December 14, 1956 (aged 88) Kingsport, Tennessee, U.S.
- Party: Republican
- Spouse(s): Callie Pridemore; Hannah Blanche Rollins
- Education: Milligan College (BS)

John Franklin Sergent (December 6, 1868 – December 14, 1956) was an American Republican politician who served in the Virginia Senate from 1922 to 1924.

Senate of Virginia
Preceded by Charles S. Pendleton	Virginia Senator for the 2nd District; 1922–1924	Succeeded by John A. Lesner; James S. Barron
