= Lewis Parker (politician) =

American politician

Lew Parker

Member of the Virginia House of Delegates from the 61st district
- In office January 12, 1983 – January 12, 1994
- Preceded by: None (district created)
- Succeeded by: Frank Ruff

Member of the Virginia House of Delegates from the 26th district
- In office January 13, 1982 – January 12, 1983
- Preceded by: Mitchell Van Yahres; James B. Murray
- Succeeded by: Emmett Hanger

Member of the Virginia House of Delegates from the 29th district
- In office August 10, 1972 – January 13, 1982
- Preceded by: Grady W. Dalton
- Succeeded by: V. Earl Dickinson

Personal details
- Born: Lewis Wardlaw Parker Jr. June 30, 1928 Greenville, South Carolina
- Died: January 29, 2011 (aged 82) Richmond, Virginia
- Party: Democratic
- Education: University of Virginia
- Occupation: Corporate executive

Lewis Wardlaw "Lew" Parker Jr. (June 30, 1928 – January 29, 2011) from South Hill, Virginia was a politician and former Democratic member of the Virginia House of Delegates. He represented the 61st district, which included parts of Amelia, Brunswick, Lunenburg, Mecklenburg, Nottoway, and Prince Edward counties. He held the seat from his first election in 1972 to his defeat for re-election in 1993.
