= Ralph Hunter Daughton =

American politician (1885-1958)

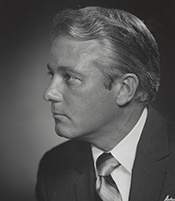

Member of the U.S. House of Representatives from Virginia's 2nd district
- In office November 7, 1944 – January 3, 1947
- Preceded by: Winder R. Harris
- Succeeded by: Porter Hardy, Jr.

Member of the Virginia Senate from the 2nd district
- In office January 10, 1940 – November 7, 1944
- Preceded by: John A. Lesner
- Succeeded by: James Hoge Tyler III

Member of the Virginia House of Delegates from Norfolk City
- In office 1933–1940
- Preceded by: Wilson W. Vellines

Personal details
- Born: Ralph Hunter Daughton; September 23, 1885 Washington, D.C., U.S.
- Died: December 22, 1958 (aged 73) Norfolk, Virginia, U.S.
- Party: Democratic
- Spouse: Susan Taggart
- Education: National University School of Law
- Profession: attorney, baseball league president

Ralph Hunter Daughton (September 23, 1885 – December 22, 1958) was an American lawyer and politician who served as a U.S. representative from Virginia from 1944 to 1947.

== Early life and career ==
Born in Washington, D.C., Daughton attended public and private schools in Washington, D.C., and Prince George's County, Maryland. He graduated from the law department of National University, Washington, D.C., in 1905.

He was admitted to the bar in 1907 and practiced law in Washington, D.C., and later joined the investigative agency of the Department of Justice, which later became the Federal Bureau of Investigation in 1910. He moved to Norfolk, Virginia, in 1912, and served as chief of the F.B.I. for Virginia, North Carolina, West Virginia, and part of Maryland until after the First World War. He commenced the private practice of law in Norfolk, Virginia.

He served in the Virginia House of Delegates from 1933 to 1940. He served as member of the Senate of Virginia from 1940 to 1944. In 1938 he was elected president of the Piedmont Baseball League and served for nine years.

== Congress ==
Daughton was elected as a Democrat to the Seventy-eighth Congress to fill the vacancy caused by the resignation of Winder R. Harris and at the same time was elected to the Seventy-ninth Congress and served from November 7, 1944, to January 3, 1947. He was an unsuccessful candidate for renomination in 1946.

== Later career and death ==
He resumed the practice of law until his death.

He died in Norfolk, Virginia, December 22, 1958. He was interred in Mount Olivet Cemetery, Washington, D.C.

== Election of 1944 ==
Daughton won the special election to Congress, defeating Republican Thomas L. Woodward and Independent W.B. Shafer winning 54.47% of the vote. Daughton won the general election over the same two opponents with 57.68% of the vote.

== Sources ==
- United States Congress. "Ralph Hunter Daughton (id: D000067)". Biographical Directory of the United States Congress.

U.S. House of Representatives
Preceded by Winder R. Harris	Member of the U.S. House of Representatives from Virginia's 2nd congressional district 1944–1947	Succeeded by Porter Hardy, Jr.
