= Thomas C. Wright =

American politician (born 1948)

Member of the Virginia House of Delegates
- Incumbent
- Assumed office January 3, 2001
- Preceded by: Frank Ruff
- Constituency: 61st district (2001–2024); 50th district (2024–present)

Personal details
- Born: April 27, 1948 (age 78) Richmond, Virginia, U.S.
- Party: Republican
- Spouse: Frances Rose Abernathy
- Children: Thomas III, Briggs
- Education: Old Dominion University
- Occupation: Politician
- Committees: Agriculture, Chesapeake and Natural Resources; General Laws; Militia, Police and Public Safety

Thomas C. "Tommy" Wright Jr. (born April 27, 1948) is an American politician. Since 2001 he has served in the Virginia House of Delegates, representing the 50th district in the Southside Virginia counties of Amelia, Cumberland, Mecklenburg and Nottoway, plus part of Lunenburg County. He is a member of the Republican Party.

Wright has served on the House committees on Agriculture (2001), Agriculture, Chesapeake and Natural Resources (2002–), Claims (2001), Conservation and Natural Resources (2001), Counties, Cities and Towns (2001), General Laws (2002–), Militia and Police (2001), and Militia, Police and Public Safety (2002–).

== Early life, education ==
Wright was born in Richmond, Virginia. He graduated from Victoria High School in 1966, and received a B.A. degree in political science from Old Dominion University in 1970.

== Electoral history ==
Wright was elected to the Lunenburg County Board of Supervisors in 1993 and 1997. He served as chairman 1995–1997.

State Senator Richard J. Holland died on April 16, 2000. He was succeeded in office by 61st district Delegate Frank Ruff, who won a special election on November 7, 2000. Wright received the Republican nomination to replace Ruff, and won the seat in another special election on December 19.

Wright voted against a bill to eliminate a law banning sexual intercourse before marriage in the 2020 legislative session. The bill passed 91–5 with bipartisan support in the house.

Date	Election	Candidate	Party	Votes	%
Virginia House of Delegates, 61st district
Dec 19, 2000	Special	T C Wright Jr	Republican	5,097	54.77
Dec 19, 2000	Special	F W Bacon	Democratic	4,205	45.18
Dec 19, 2000	Special	Write Ins		5	0.05
Dec 19, 2000	Special	Frank Ruff was elected to the Senate; seat stayed Republican			
Nov 6, 2001	General	T C Wright Jr	Republican	10,529	59.64
Nov 6, 2001	General	W E Keel	Democratic	7,118	40.32
Nov 6, 2001	General	Write Ins		8	0.05
Nov 4, 2003	General	T C Wright Jr	Republican	9,975	99.65
Nov 4, 2003	General	Write Ins		35	0.35
Nov 8, 2005	General	T C Wright Jr	Republican	12,542	99.39
Nov 8, 2005	General	Write Ins		77	0.61
Nov 6, 2007	General	Thomas C. Wright Jr.	Republican	14,279	99.58
Nov 6, 2007	General	Write Ins		60	0.41
Nov 3, 2009	General	Thomas C. Wright Jr.	Republican	14,766	99.26
Nov 3, 2009	General	Write Ins		109	0.73
Nov 8, 2011	General	Thomas C. Wright Jr.	Republican	15,578	99.31
Nov 8, 2011	General	Write Ins		107	0.68
