= Danny Diggs =

American politician from Virginia

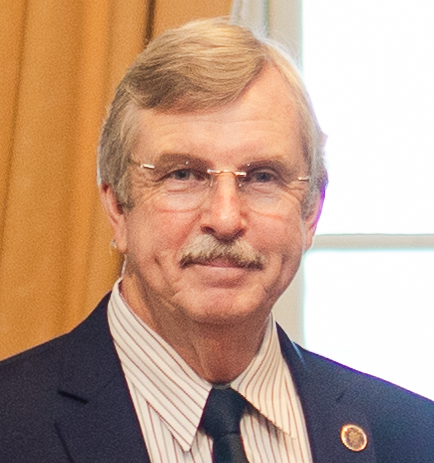
- Diggs in 2024

Member of the Virginia Senate from the 24th district
- Incumbent
- Assumed office January 10, 2024
- Preceded by: Emmett Hanger (redistricting)

Personal details
- Born: Joseph Daniel Diggs; July 6, 1957 (age 69) Hampton, Virginia, U.S.
- Party: Republican
- Occupation: Sheriff; Virginia State Senator
- Website: www.diggsforsenate.com

Joseph Daniel Diggs (born July 6, 1967) is an American Republican politician from Virginia. In 2000, he was elected as the Sheriff of York County and Poquoson. He served in this capacity until January 1, 2023. He was elected to the Virginia Senate in the 2023 Virginia Senate election from the 24th district. He unseated incumbent state senator Monty Mason.

Senate of Virginia
Preceded by Emmett Hanger	Member of the Virginia Senate from the 24th district 2024–Present	Incumbent
