= James Hoge Tyler III =

American politician

Member of the Virginia Senate from the 2nd district
- In office January 29, 1945 – January 14, 1948
- Preceded by: Ralph Hunter Daughton
- Succeeded by: Robert F. Baldwin Jr.

Member of the Virginia House of Delegates from Norfolk City
- In office January 14, 1942 – January 29, 1945
- Preceded by: Richard W. Ruffin

Personal details
- Born: James Hoge Tyler III; May 21, 1910 Norfolk, Virginia, U.S.
- Died: September 29, 1988 (aged 78) Virginia Beach, Virginia, U.S.
- Party: Democratic
- Spouse: Mabel Burroughs
- Education: Washington and Lee University

James Hoge Tyler III (May 21, 1910 – September 29, 1988) was an American attorney and politician who served as a member of the Virginia Senate. He was the grandson on Governor James Hoge Tyler.

Senate of Virginia
Preceded by Ralph Hunter Daughton	Virginia Senator for the 2nd District; 1945–1948	Succeeded by Robert F. Baldwin Jr.
