= John M. Goodloe =

American politician (1858–1942)

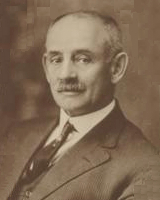

Member of the Virginia Senate from the 2nd district
- In office January 12, 1916 – January 14, 1920
- Preceded by: John H. Catron
- Succeeded by: Charles S. Pendleton

Personal details
- Born: John Mills Goodloe; August 5, 1858 Baltimore, Maryland, U.S.
- Died: August 17, 1942 (aged 84) Shaker Heights, Ohio, U.S.
- Party: Republican
- Spouse: Elizabeth Byron Ferguson

John Mills Goodloe (August 5, 1858 – August 17, 1942) was an American Republican politician who served as a member of the Virginia Senate, representing the state's 2nd district.

== Political career ==
Goodloe defeated incumbent John H. Catron, who ran as a Progressive, and Independent T. B. Ely to win election to the Virginia Senate in 1915.

== Electoral history ==
Date	Election	Candidate	Party	Votes	%
Virginia Senate, 2nd district
Nov 2, 1915	General	John M. Goodloe	Republican	-	-
Nov 2, 1915	General	John H. Catron (inc.)	Progressive	-	-
Nov 2, 1915	General	Thomas B. Ely	Independent	-	-

Senate of Virginia
Preceded by John H. Catron	Virginia Senator for the 2nd District; 1916–1920	Succeeded by Charles S. Pendleton
