= Ann Hitch Kilgore =

American politician

Mayor of Hampton, Virginia
- In office 1974–1978
- Preceded by: David Montague
- Succeeded by: Charles A. Wornom
- In office 1963–1971
- Preceded by: George C. Bentley
- Succeeded by: David Montague

Personal details
- Born: Ann Cato Hitch; July 22, 1923 Portsmouth, Virginia, U.S.
- Died: July 20, 2001 (aged 77) Newport News, Virginia, U.S.
- Spouse: Edwin Carroll Kilgore (m. 1944)
- Children: 2
- Education: College of William & Mary

Ann Hitch Kilgore (July 22, 1923 – July 20, 2001) was a Virginia educator and politician. She served on the city council of Hampton, Virginia for more than two decades, and became the city's first female mayor, serving from 1963–71 and 1974–78.

== Personal life ==
Ann Hitch was born in Portsmouth, Virginia, to Edward Ashby Hitch and Marietta Cato Hitch (who was a teacher and principal in Portsmouth). Educated in the local public schools, she graduated from Woodrow Wilson High School, and then the Norfolk Division of The College of William and Mary (now Old Dominion University), and The College of William and Mary.

In 1944, she married U.S. Navy engineer (and later NASA aeronautical engineer) Edwin Carroll Kilgore. The couple moved to Hampton, Virginia in 1946 where he worked at the Langley Research Center. They had two children—Ashby Caroline Kilgore and Elizabeth Kilgore Byrd (husband, Richard Kenneth Byrd) and one grandson, Richard Kilgore Byrd—before her death ended their 57-year marriage. Dr. Ashby Kilgore served as the Superintendent of Newport News Public Schools in nearby Newport News.

== Career ==
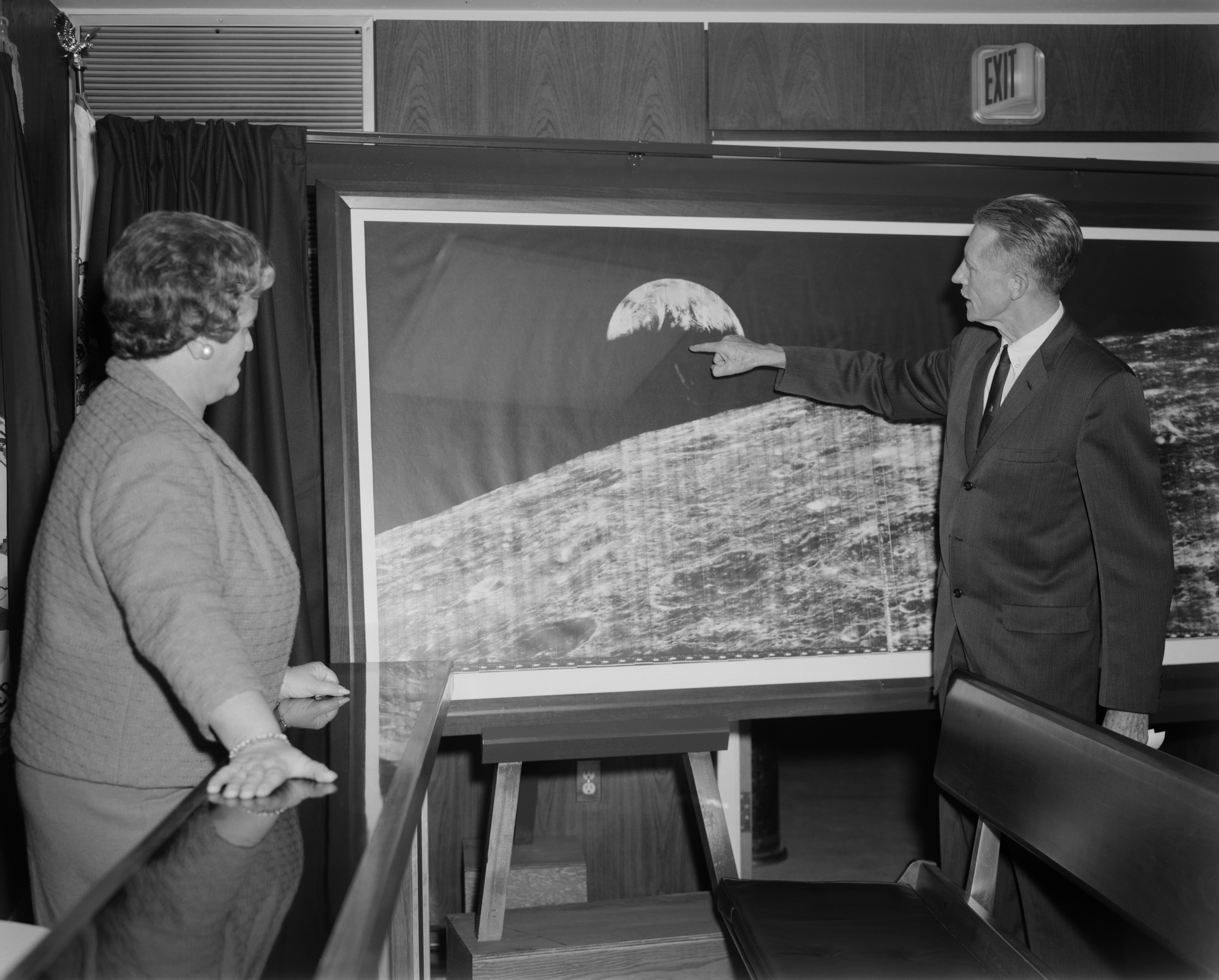
Kilgore with Floyd L. Thompson, Director of NASA's Langley Research Center, in 1966

After graduating with a degree in education, Ann Hitch (later Kilgore) became an English teacher in Norfolk County, Virginia. She taught first in her Portsmouth hometown at Alexander Park High School, and later at Hampton High School in Hampton after it was built in 1956.

She was also active in the local community, and became president of the Hampton Junior Women's Club from 1955 to 1957. This was during Virginia's Massive Resistance crisis following the United States Supreme Court decisions in Brown v. Board of Education. Early in the crisis, some African American citizens of Norfolk City sued the public school system to obtain access to the whites-only secondary schools, and in 1956 the Byrd Organization threatened to close all Virginia public schools to prevent court-ordered desegregation (contrary to the wishes of many Norfolk City and County citizens).

In 1958, Ann Kilgore ran for one of three open seats on Hampton's City Council, and won. She continued to win re-election until retiring in 1980. In 1963, fellow Councillors elected Ann Kilgore as Hampton's Mayor. She led the city as its mayor from 1963 to 1971 and again from 1974 to 1978. She considered successfully integrating Hampton's schools and businesses without litigation as her greatest accomplishment. Also during her tenure as mayor, the City of Hampton built the Hampton Coliseum, City Hall and police station, and donated land for Thomas Nelson Community College. She also fostered the local tourist industry and improved interracial relations generally as the city tripled in size from fewer than 30,000 citizens to more than 100,000 people.

== Death ==
Ann Kilgore died at Riverside Regional Medical Center in Newport News, Virginia on July 20, 2001. It was 2 days before her birthday.
