= List of mayors of Hampton, Virginia =

Mayor of Hampton, Virginia
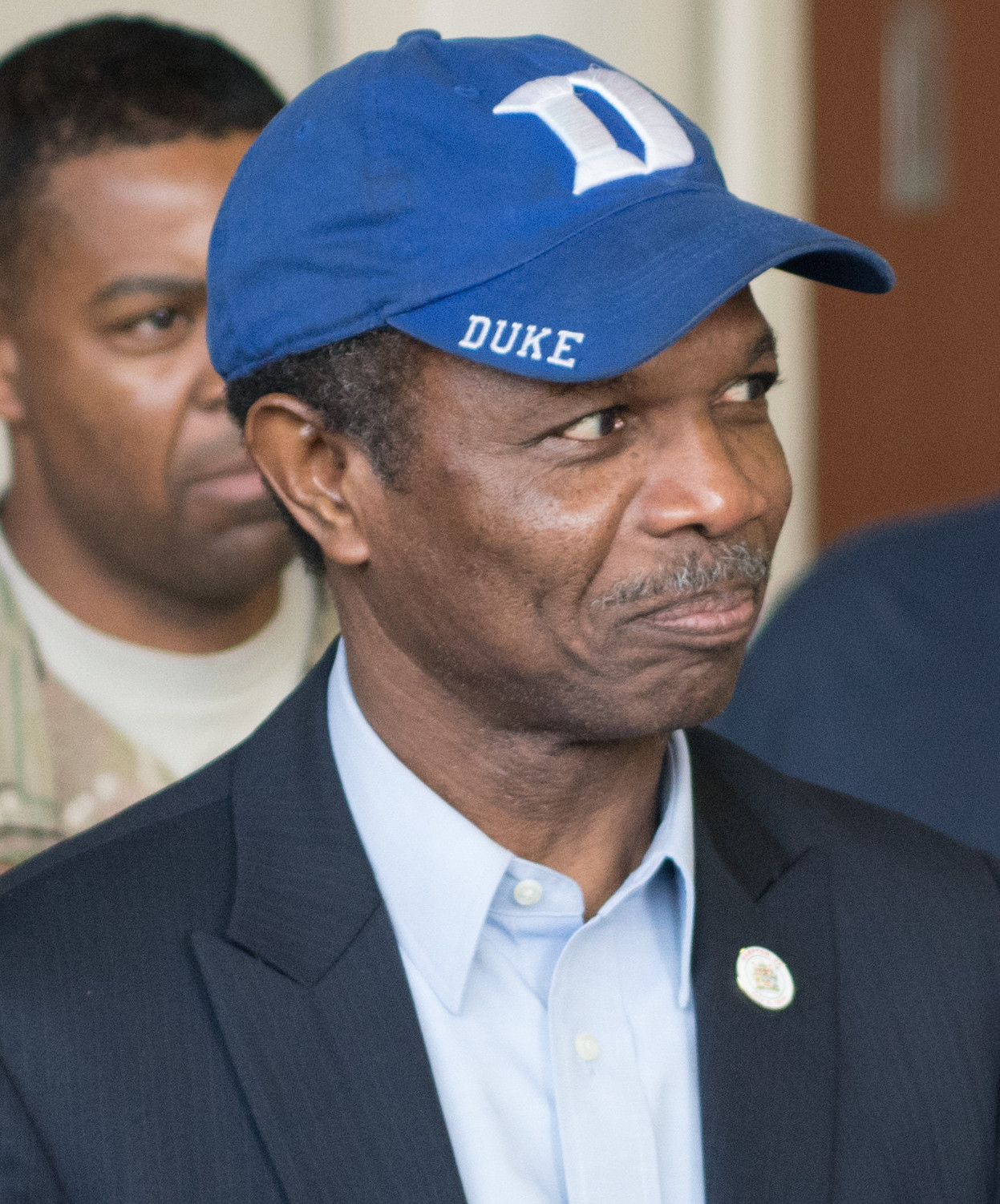
- Incumbent; Donnie Tuck since 2014
- Type: Mayor
- Formation: 1900
- First holder: James Barron Hope, Jr.

This is a list of people who have served as mayor of the city of Hampton, Virginia.

Image	Mayor	Term	Notes
	James Barron Hope, Jr.	1900–1905	
	Thornton Jones	1905–1916	
	Thomas Sclater	1917–1919	
	James V. Bickford	1920–1946	
	Henry F. Marrow	1947–1949	
	George C. Bentley	1949–1952	
	James L. Crenshaw	1952–1954	
	John Mittelmaier	1954–1955	
	George C. Bentley	1955–1963	
	Ann Hitch Kilgore	1963–1971	
	David Montague	1971–1974	
	Ann Hitch Kilgore	1974–1978	
	Charles A. Wornom	1978–1980	
	Thomas Gear	1980–1982	
	James Eason	1982–1998	
	Joseph Spencer II	1998–2000	
	Mamie Locke	2000–2004	First African American mayor of Hampton.
	Charles A. Wornom	2004–2004	Served as an interim mayor from January 14 until July 1, 2004
	Ross Kearney II	2004–2008	
	Molly Joseph Ward	2008–2013	Served as a Special Assistant to the President of the United States and Deputy Director for the Office of Intergovernmental Affairs from 2013 to 2014
	George E. Wallace	2013–2016	Served as an interim mayor from 2013 to 2014
	Donnie Tuck	2016– 2025	
	Jimmy Gray	2025–Present	4th African American to serve as mayor of Hampton

== See also ==
- Timeline of Hampton, Virginia
