= David S. Bill III =

American rear admiral

RADM David Spencer Bill III
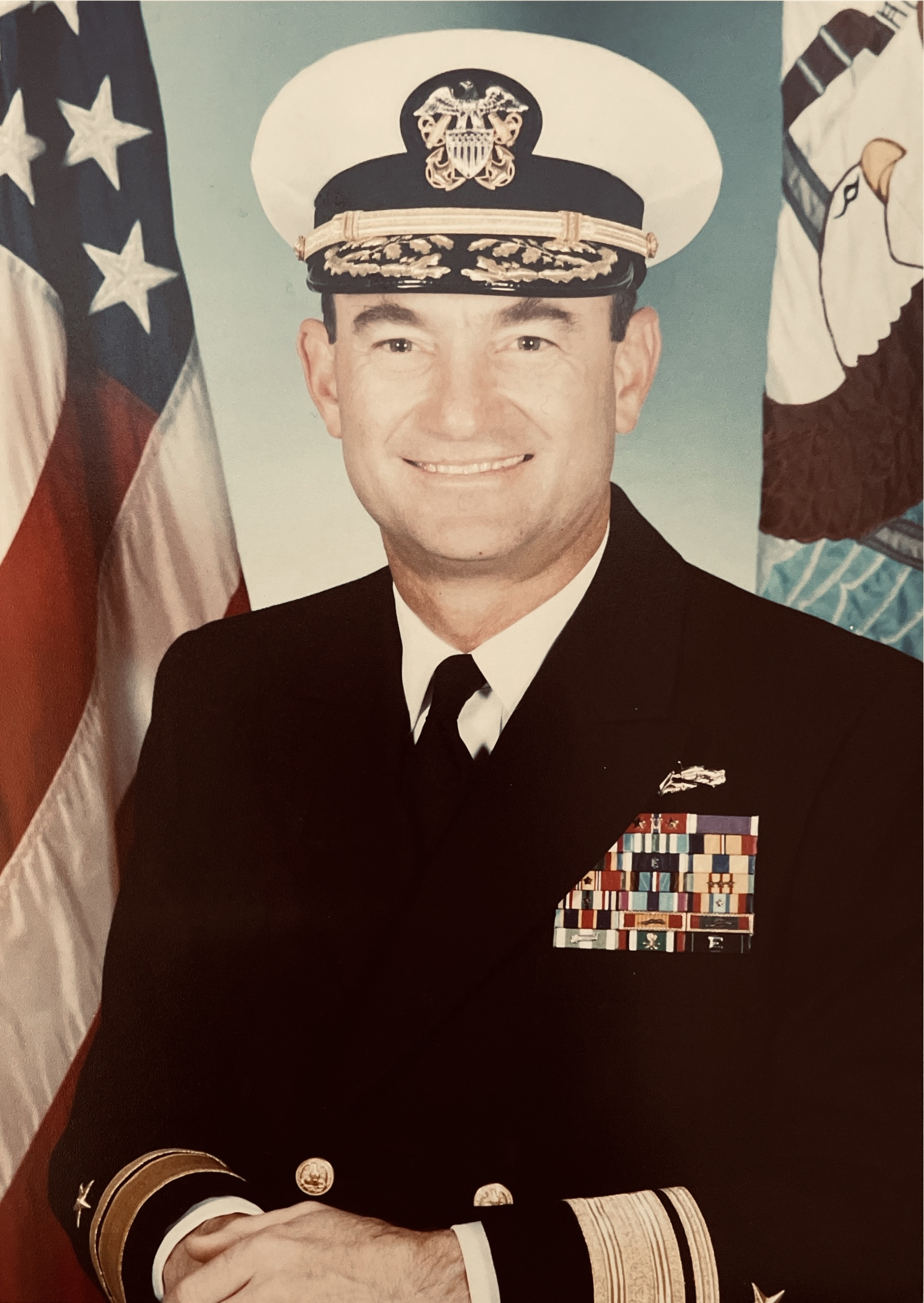
- Born: August 27, 1944 (age 82); Norfolk, Virginia
- Relatives: Grandson of Winder R. Harris, Great grandmother was related to Major John Redd.
- Military career
- Branch: United States Navy
- Service years: 1966–1998
- Rank: Rear admiral (upper half)
- Commands: USS Wisconsin (BB-64); USS Mobile Bay (CG-53); USS Mahan (DDG-42)
- Conflicts: Vietnam War; Gulf War
- Awards: Defense Distinguished Service Medal; Legion of Merit (7)

David Spencer Bill III (born August 27, 1944) is a retired rear admiral (upper half) in the United States Navy.

He is a native of Norfolk, Virginia. His father was a captain in the Navy, his grandfather was U.S. Representative Winder R. Harris.

== Career ==
Bill graduated from the United States Naval Academy in 1966. He would serve aboard the USS John King (DDG-3) before being deployed to serve on River Boats in the Vietnam War, where he made 150 combat patrols in the Mekong Delta, was wounded in action, and received the Bronze Star for valor.

Later, he was assigned to the USS Joseph P. Kennedy, Jr. (DD-850) and the USS Talbot (FFG-4) before being assigned as Executive Assistant to Commander Naval Forces Caribbean in Roosevelt Roads, Puerto Rico and attended the Royal Naval Staff College in England. He was then assigned to United States Naval Forces Europe before being named Executive Officer of the USS Coontz (DDG-40).

From 1981 to 1983, he was stationed in Gaeta, Italy as Flag Secretary to the United States Sixth Fleet. In 1984, he took command of the USS Mahan (DDG-42) and participated in the Libyan Operations. In 1986, Bill was assigned to the Aegis ship building program. Afterward, he was assigned to be Executive Assistant to the Commander, Naval Sea Systems Command. In 1988, he was assigned command of the USS Mobile Bay (CG-53).

During the Gulf War, Bill commanded the USS Wisconsin (BB-64). While in command he was responsible for the Tomahawk launches that started the war. Wisconsin fired over 350 16-inch rounds in support of allied ground forces and against entrenched Iraqi troops. Several days before the start of the ground war, Wisconsin's bombardment of an Iraqi headquarters site on the Persian Gulf coast precipitated the Iraqi premature destruction of numerous oil wells in Kuwait as a defensive measure against the anticipated ground attack by coalition forces. On February 23, 1991, the Wisconsin launched a Pioneer to Failaka Island, the Iraqi Armed Forces surrendered immediately before a shot was fired after realizing the Wisconsin's Pioneer had seen them. This marked the first time enemy troops surrendered to an unmanned aircraft controlled by a ship.

Selected for Flag Rank during the first Gulf War, Admiral Bill subsequently served on the staff of the Chief of Naval Operations, was Operations Officer and then Deputy Commander Atlantic Fleet, Commander of Cruiser Destroyer Group Twelve, The USS Enterprise Battle Group, and Deputy Commander US Naval Forces Europe.

Awards he received include a Defense Distinguished Service Medal, seven awards of the Legion of Merit, one award for combat valor, three Bronze Star Medals, the Purple Heart, the Meritorious Service Medal, the Joint Service Commendation Medal and the Combat Action Ribbon.

Retiring after over 32 years of active duty in 1998, Admiral Bill was executive director of a Development Company that created Cherokee Plantation in South Carolina and the Carnegie Abbey Club in Newport, RI. He held a chair at the Naval Postgraduate School, was executive director of the Naval Postgraduate School Foundation, was CEO of a start up technology company, CEO of the Northern California Golf Association and currently sits on several privately held company boards.
