= Winder R. Harris =

American journalist

Winder Russell Harris

Member of the U.S. House of Representatives from Virginia's 2nd district
- In office April 8, 1941 – September 15, 1944
- Preceded by: Colgate Darden
- Succeeded by: Ralph Hunter Daughton

Personal details
- Born: December 3, 1888 Wake County, North Carolina
- Died: February 24, 1973 (aged 84) Alexandria, Virginia
- Resting place: Raleigh, North Carolina
- Party: Democratic
- Education: St. Mary's College
- Profession: journalist, civil servant

Winder Russell Harris (December 3, 1888 – February 24, 1973) was an American journalist, civil servant, and politician who served as a U.S. representative from Virginia from 1941 to 1944.

== Early life and career ==
Born in Wake County (now a part of Raleigh), North Carolina, Harris attended the public schools and St. Mary's College (now Belmont Abbey College), Belmont, North Carolina.

He served in various editorial positions on newspapers in North Carolina and Virginia from 1908 to 1918. He then turned to a career in civil service, working as a member of the staff of Universal Service in Washington, D.C. from 1918 to 1925. He served as assistant secretary to the American delegation to the International Narcotics Congress in Geneva, Switzerland, in 1924 and 1925. Returning to journalism, he was managing editor of the Virginian-Pilot, Norfolk, Virginia from 1925 to 1941.

== U.S. House ==
Harris was elected as a Democrat to the Seventy-seventh Congress, on April 8, 1941 in a special election to fill the vacancy caused by the resignation of Colgate W. Darden, Jr. He was re-elected to the Seventy-eighth Congress and served until his resignation on September 15, 1944.

== After Congress ==
He was the vice president of the Shipbuilders' Council of America, in Washington, D.C., until his retirement on December 31, 1958. He also served as vice chairman of the Board of Commissioners of the Alexandria Redevelopment and Housing Authority from September 1955 until his resignation in November 1961.

He was editor of the Alexandria Journal, the Arlington Journal, and the Fairfax County Journal-Standard until his retirement in March 1966.

== Retirement and death ==
He resided in Alexandria, Virginia, until his death on February 24, 1973. He was interred in Oakwood Cemetery, Raleigh, North Carolina.

His grandson, David S. Bill III, became a Rear Admiral in the United States Navy.

== Electoral history ==
- 1941; Harris was elected to Congress defeating Independent Democrat Norman P. Hamilton, Independent Maurice S. McCarty, and Prohibitionist Andrew J. Dunning, Jr., winning 49.17% of the vote.
- 1942; Harris was re-elected unopposed.

== Sources ==
- United States Congress. "Winder R. Harris (id: H000260)". Biographical Directory of the United States Congress.

U.S. House of Representatives
Preceded by Colgate Darden	Member of the U.S. House of Representatives from Virginia's 2nd congressional district 1941–1944	Succeeded by Ralph Hunter Daughton
