= James B. Murray =

American politician

Member of the Virginia House of Delegates from the 24th district
- In office January 13, 1982 – January 12, 1983 Serving with Mitchell Van Yahres
- Preceded by: Wayne O'Bryan
- Succeeded by: Vance Wilkins

Member of the Virginia House of Delegates from the 26th district
- In office January 9, 1974 – January 13, 1982
- Preceded by: Daniel Van Clief
- Succeeded by: Lew Parker

Personal details
- Born: James Brady Murray; July 4, 1920 Allenhurst, New Jersey, U.S.
- Died: January 2, 2015 (aged 94) Earlysville, Virginia, U.S.
- Party: Democratic
- Spouse: Jean Brundred
- Education: Georgetown University; Yale University
- Nickname: Jim Murray

Military service
- Allegiance: United States
- Branch/service: United States Navy
- Battles/wars: World War II

James Brady Murray (July 4, 1920 – January 2, 2015) was an American businessman and politician who served in the Virginia House of Delegates.

== Early life ==
Murray was born in Allenhurst, Monmouth, New Jersey. His parents were Marie and Thomas E Murray Jr. He attended Yale University, graduating in 1943. He also served in the Navy in World War II.

== Politics ==
He was a member of the Virginia House of Delegates for the 26th district from 1974 to 1982. Then he represented the 24th district from 1982 to 1983.

He ran for reelection in the 58th district in 1982, and lost to George Allen by 25 votes out of nearly 14,000 cast.

== Personal ==
He married Jean Brundred. He was a farmer and conservationist in Virginia. He died at his home in Earlysville, Virginia in 2015.

Virginia House of Delegates
| Preceded by Daniel Van Clief | Member of the Virginia House of Delegates from the 26th district January 9, 1974–January 13, 1982 | Succeeded by Lewis Parker |
| Preceded by Wayne O'Bryan | Member of the Virginia House of Delegates from the 24th district January 13, 1982–January 12, 1983 | Succeeded by Vance Wilkins |
