= Virginia's 23rd Senate district =

American legislative district

Virginia's 23rd State Senate district
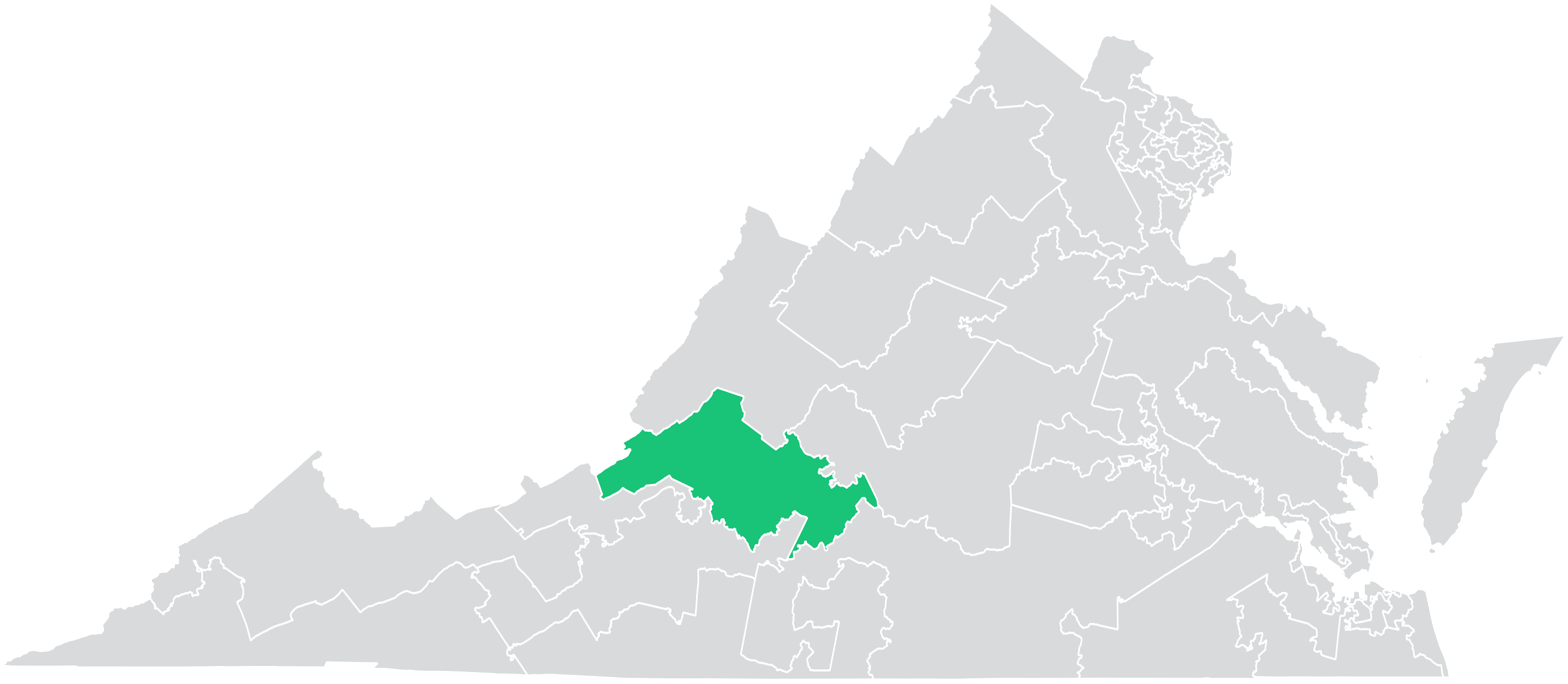
Senator
Mamie Locke; D–Hampton
- Demographics: 35% White; 49% Black; 8% Hispanic; 3% Asian; 6% Other
- Population (2022): 216,421
- Registered voters: 152,346

Virginia's 23rd Senate district is one of 40 districts in the Senate of Virginia. It has been represented by Democrat Mamie Locke since 2024.

== Geography ==
District 23 is based in the Virginia Peninsula portion of Hampton Roads and includes all of Hampton and parts of Newport News.

The district is within Virginia's 3rd congressional district, and overlaps with the 85th, 86th, and 87th districts within the Virginia House of Delegates.

== Recent election results ==
2023 Virginia Senate election, District 23
Party	Candidate	Votes	%
Democratic	Mamie Locke	35,132	89.7
Total votes		39,153	100
Democratic gain from Republican			

== Historic results ==
All results below took place before 2023 redistricting, and thus were under different district lines, most recently north of the New River Valley.

=== 2019 ===
2019 Virginia Senate election, District 23
Party	Candidate	Votes	%
Republican	Stephen Newman (incumbent)	47,374	93.9
Total votes		50,474	100
Republican hold			

=== 2015 ===
2015 Virginia Senate election, District 23
Party	Candidate	Votes	%
Republican	Stephen Newman (incumbent)	27,309	96.7
Total votes		28,232	100
Republican hold			

=== 2011 ===
2011 Virginia Senate election, District 23
Party	Candidate	Votes	%
Republican	Stephen Newman (incumbent)	33,481	77.8
Democratic	Robert Short	9,439	21.9
Total votes		43,060	100
Republican hold			

=== Federal and statewide results ===
Year	Office	Results
2020	President	Trump 72.6–25.6%
2017	Governor	Gillespie 71.4–27.6%
2016	President	Trump 70.1–25.0%
2014	Senate	Gillespie 67.8–29.9%
2013	Governor	Cuccinelli 68.0–25.1%
2012	President	Romney 68.9–29.8%
2012	Senate	Allen 68.5–31.5%

=== 2007 ===
2007 Virginia Senate election, District 23
Party	Candidate	Votes	%
Republican	Stephen Newman (incumbent)	20,269	97.2
Total votes		20,852	100
Republican hold			

=== 2003 ===
2003 Virginia Senate election, District 23
Party	Candidate	Votes	%
Republican	Stephen Newman (incumbent)	26,446	64.1
Democratic	Robert Clarke	14,812	35.9
Total votes		41,279	100
Republican hold			

=== 1999 ===
1999 Virginia Senate election, District 23
Party	Candidate	Votes	%
Republican	Stephen Newman (incumbent)	23,052	66.2
Democratic	John Campbell	11,255	32.3
Independent	John Trent	529	1.5
Total votes		34,836	100
Republican hold			

=== 1995 ===
1995 Virginia Senate election, District 23
Party	Candidate	Votes	%
Republican	Stephen Newman	29,539	65.3
Democratic	Barbara Coleman	15,690	34.7
Total votes		45,253	100
Republican gain from Democratic			
