= Charles S. Pendleton =

American politician (1880–1952)

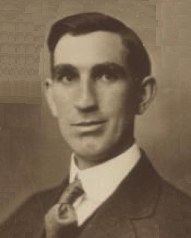

Member of the Virginia Senate from the 2nd district
- In office January 14, 1920 – June 7, 1921
- Preceded by: John M. Goodloe
- Succeeded by: J. Frank Sergent

Member of the Virginia House of Delegates from Scott County
- In office January 10, 1906 – January 10, 1912
- Preceded by: Edward A. Hoge
- Succeeded by: M. Pomeroy Taylor

Personal details
- Born: Charles Sumner Pendleton; March 28, 1880 Gate City, Virginia, U.S.
- Died: July 15, 1952 (aged 72) Scott, Virginia, U.S.
- Party: Republican
- Spouse: Pearl Margaret Taylor
- Children: 3

Charles Sumner Pendleton (March 28, 1880 – July 15, 1952) was an American Republican politician who served as a member of the Virginia Senate, representing the state's 2nd district.

== Political career ==
After serving in the House of Delegates, Pendleton was elected to the state senate in 1919. He resigned after a year and a half into his term to accept appointment as the Federal Prohibition Director for Virginia, serving in that position from June 7, 1921 to December 31, 1926.

Virginia House of Delegates
Preceded by Edward A. Hoge	Virginia Delegate for Scott County; 1906–1912	Succeeded by M. Pomeroy Taylor
Senate of Virginia
Preceded by John M. Goodloe	Virginia Senator for the 2nd District; 1920–1921	Succeeded by J. Frank Sergent
