= Frank Ruff =

American politician from Virginia (1949–2024)

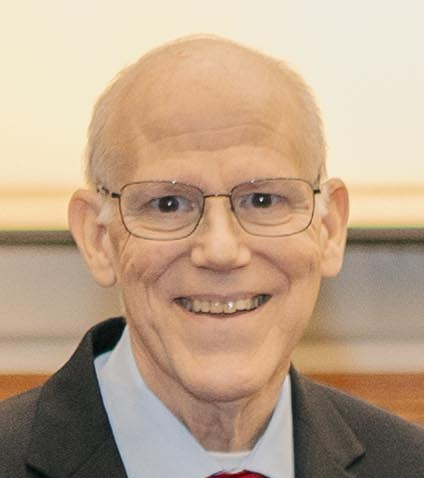
- Ruff in 2024

Member of the Virginia Senate from the 15th district
- In office December 5, 2000 – January 9, 2024
- Preceded by: Richard Holland
- Succeeded by: Tammy Brankley Mulchi (redistricting)

Member of the Virginia House of Delegates from the 61st district
- In office January 12, 1994 – December 5, 2000
- Preceded by: Lewis Parker Jr.
- Succeeded by: Tommy Wright

Personal details
- Born: Frank Miller Ruff Jr. September 22, 1949 Bedford County, Virginia, U.S.
- Died: October 26, 2024 (aged 75) Clarksville, Virginia, U.S.
- Party: Republican
- Spouse: Jessica
- Children: Frank III, Thomas, David, Genny Beth
- Education: University of Richmond
- Occupation: Business owner
- Committees: Agriculture, Conservation and Natural Resources; Finance and Appropriations; General Laws and Technology; Privileges and Elections

Frank Miller Ruff Jr. (September 22, 1949 – October 26, 2024) was an American politician who served in the Virginia General Assembly. A Republican, he served in the Virginia House of Delegates for the 61st district from 1994 to 2000 and in the Senate of Virginia for the 15th district from 2000 to 2024 representing parts of Southside Virginia.

Due to ongoing treatment for kidney cancer, Ruff resigned from his Senate seat on January 9, 2024. He had previously been elected to a sixth term in the redrawn 9th district in 2023, a special election was held on January 9, 2024. He died at his home in Clarksville, Virginia, on October 26, 2024, at the age of 75.

Virginia House of Delegates
Preceded by Lewis Parker Jr.	Member of the Virginia House of Delegates from the 61st district 1994–2000	Succeeded by Tommy Wright
Senate of Virginia
Preceded by Richard Holland	Member of the Virginia Senate from the 15th district 2000–2024	Succeeded by Ghazala Hashmi
