= Emmett Hanger =

American senator (born 1948)

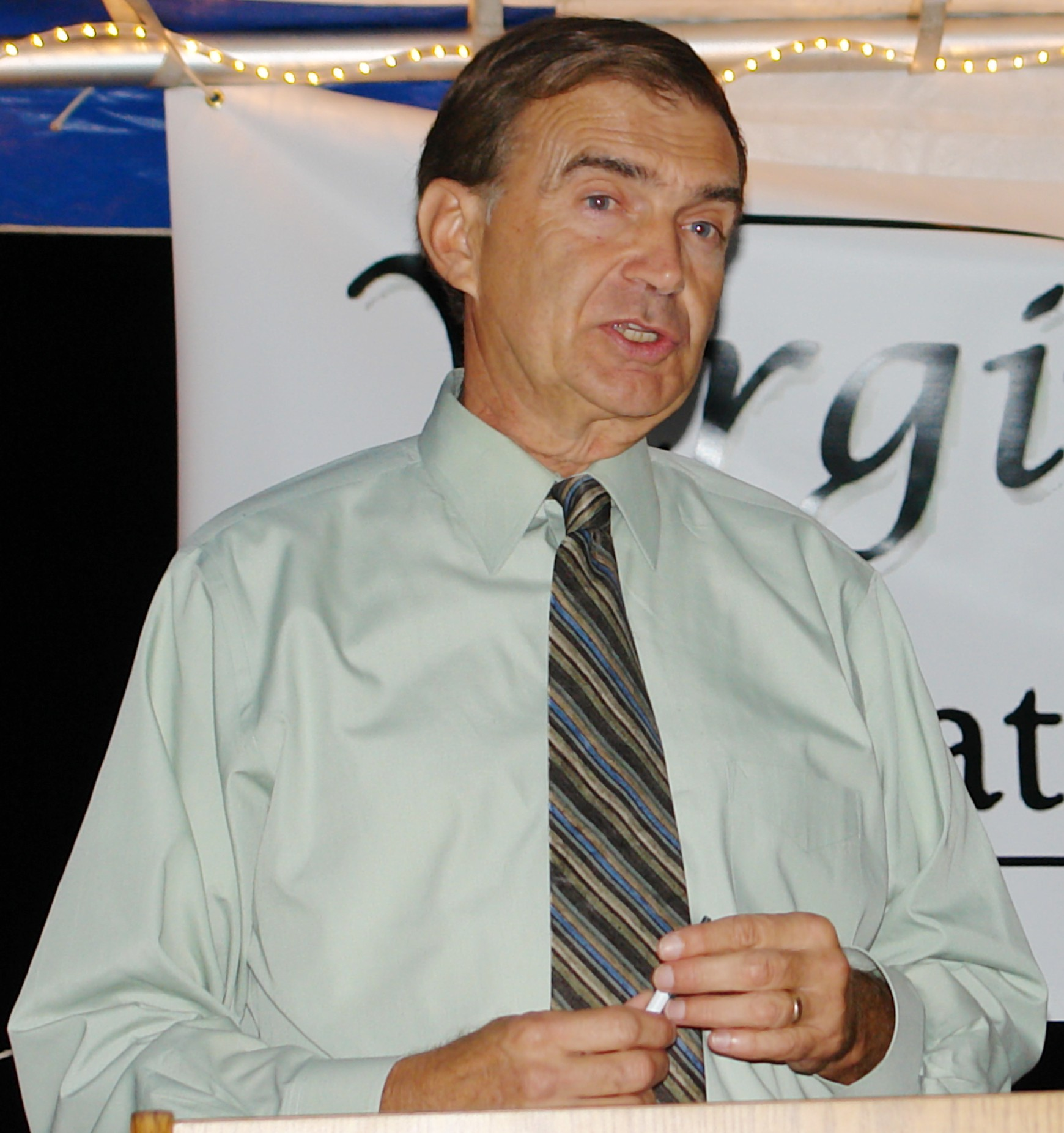

Member of the Virginia Senate from the 24th district
- In office January 10, 1996 – January 10, 2024
- Preceded by: Frank Nolen
- Succeeded by: Mark Obenshain (redistricting)

Member of the Virginia House of Delegates from the 26th district
- In office January 12, 1983 – January 8, 1992
- Preceded by: Lewis Parker Jr.
- Succeeded by: Clinton Miller

Personal details
- Born: Emmett Wilson Hanger Jr. August 2, 1948 (age 78) Staunton, Virginia, U.S.
- Party: Republican
- Spouse: Sharon
- Children: 5
- Education: James Madison University
- Occupation: Real estate
- Committees: Agriculture, Conservation and Natural Resources; Finance and Appropriations; Local Government; Rehabilitation and Social Services

Military service
- Branch/service: United States Army
- Years of service: 1971–1983
- Rank: Captain
- Unit: Virginia Army National Guard
- Commands: Infantry company

Emmett Wilson Hanger Jr. (born August 2, 1948, in Staunton, Virginia) is an American politician of the Republican Party. He was a member of the Virginia House of Delegates from 1983 to 1991, when he was unseated by Creigh Deeds. He then served as member of the Senate of Virginia, representing the 24th district from 1996 to 2024. This district, located in the central Shenandoah Valley and nearby sections of the Blue Ridge Mountains, included the independent cities of Staunton, and Waynesboro, as well as Augusta County, Greene County, Madison County, and parts of Rockingham County and Culpeper County.

== Early life and career ==
Hanger was a former National Guard Commander and served as a captain in the United States Army.

== Political career ==
=== Virginia House of Delegates ===
Hanger served in the Virginia House of Delegates from 1983 to 1992.

=== Virginia state senate ===
Hanger was already elected to the state senate for the first time in 1996. In the senate, he was a member of the following committees: Agriculture, Conservation and Natural Resources; Finance; Local Government; and Rehabilitation and Social Services.

In 2018, Hanger was rated the 10th most productive state legislator in the United States by FiscalNote, a data analytics firm based out of Washington, D.C. FiscalNote's methodology is based on the quantity of bills sponsored, how far each sponsored bills progresses through the legislative process, and how substantive the bill is.

=== Political positions ===
==== Healthcare ====
Hanger was known for his open support of Medicaid expansion under the Affordable Care Act, which he pursued for multiple budget cycles. Due to his open support of Medicaid expansion, he attracted opposition from a number of conservative organizations. In October 2013, the Americans for Prosperity (AFP) group began, according to Hanger, "an attempt to intimidate me" in the AFP group's campaign to oppose "Obamacare" in Virginia. In 2015, Hanger was challenged for the Republican nomination by Dan Moxley, former Augusta County GOP chairman and Republican activist, and Marshall Pattie, former Augusta County Democratic Committee chairman and Augusta County Board of Supervisors member from Augusta County's North River District.

In 2018, Hanger succeeded in pushing through the Medicaid expansion as part of the 2018 budget cycle with the support of a bipartisan coalition in both the House of Delegates and the state senate.

Hanger also advocates for mental health, and has called for improving treatment resources in state mental health facilities.

==== Political reform ====
Hanger supports redistricting reform in order to combat gerrymandering. In 2019, he co-sponsored a successful bipartisan resolution alongside Senator Mamie Locke (D-Hampton). This bill, SJ 274, would create a 10-member Citizens Redistricting Commission made up of members of the general public selected by leaders in both chambers of the general assembly as well as retired circuit court judges. This panel would be responsible for drawing the state legislative boundaries as well as Virginia's 11 Congressional districts and would be charged with ensuring that the district lines not be biased against any party or candidate, not abridge the rights of minority voters, and respect existing municipal boundaries. This bill would require a state constitutional amendment, which under Virginia law requires it to pass the general assembly in two consecutive sessions and then be voted on in a referendum in fall 2021.

==== Women's rights ====
Hanger voted in favor of ratifying the Equal Rights Amendment (ERA) during the 2020 session of the general assembly. If enacted, the ERA would guarantee equal legal rights for all American citizens regardless of sex.

==== Tax reform ====
Hanger supported a proposal to allow Virginia localities to impose local taxes on cigarettes. These sales taxes, which could be up to 40 cents per pack, would be levied in addition to the existing state taxes. This proposal was introduced as part of Hanger's bill allowing counties the same authority to impose taxes on meals, lodging, and admissions without requiring a referendum.

==== LGBT rights ====
In the 2020 session of the general assembly, Hanger voted in favor of the Virginia Values Act, which would add sexual orientation and gender identity to the list of protected characteristics under Virginia's laws against discrimination in housing, employment and places of public accommodation.

== Electoral history ==
=== 2019 Virginia state elections ===
Hanger was challenged for his seat by Tina Freitas, the wife of incumbent delegate Nick Freitas. Freitas criticized Hanger's views on gun control, abortion, as well as his support for Medicaid expansion.

Hanger overcame the primary challenge and secured the Republican Party nomination in a June 10 vote. He went on to actually win the general election in a landslide against yoga teacher Annette Hyde, with 71% of the vote.

== Awards and honors ==
Alongside Governor Ralph Northam, Hanger received the "Hero in Health Care Extraordinaire” from the Virginia Health Care Foundation for his work in passing the Medicaid expansion.

Hanger also received plaudits at the first inaugural unity breakfast held by Unite America's Virginia branch, Unite Virginia in 2019. Unite Virginia, a non-profit group that promotes bipartisanship and independent candidates, honored Hanger for his work in passing the Medicaid expansion as well as for advocating for redistricting and campaign finance reform. Alongside Hanger, the group honored Virginia state delegate and Hanover Republican Chris Peace as well as Democratic state delegate Sam Rasoul from Roanoke and state senator Mamie Locke from Hampton Roads.

Virginia House of Delegates
Preceded by Lewis Parker Jr.	Member of the Virginia House of Delegates from the 26th district 1983–1992	Succeeded by Clinton Miller
Senate of Virginia
Preceded by Frank Nolen	Member of the Virginia Senate from the 24th district 1996–2024	Succeeded by Danny Diggs
