= Virginia's 24th Senate district =

American legislative district

Virginia's 24th State Senate district
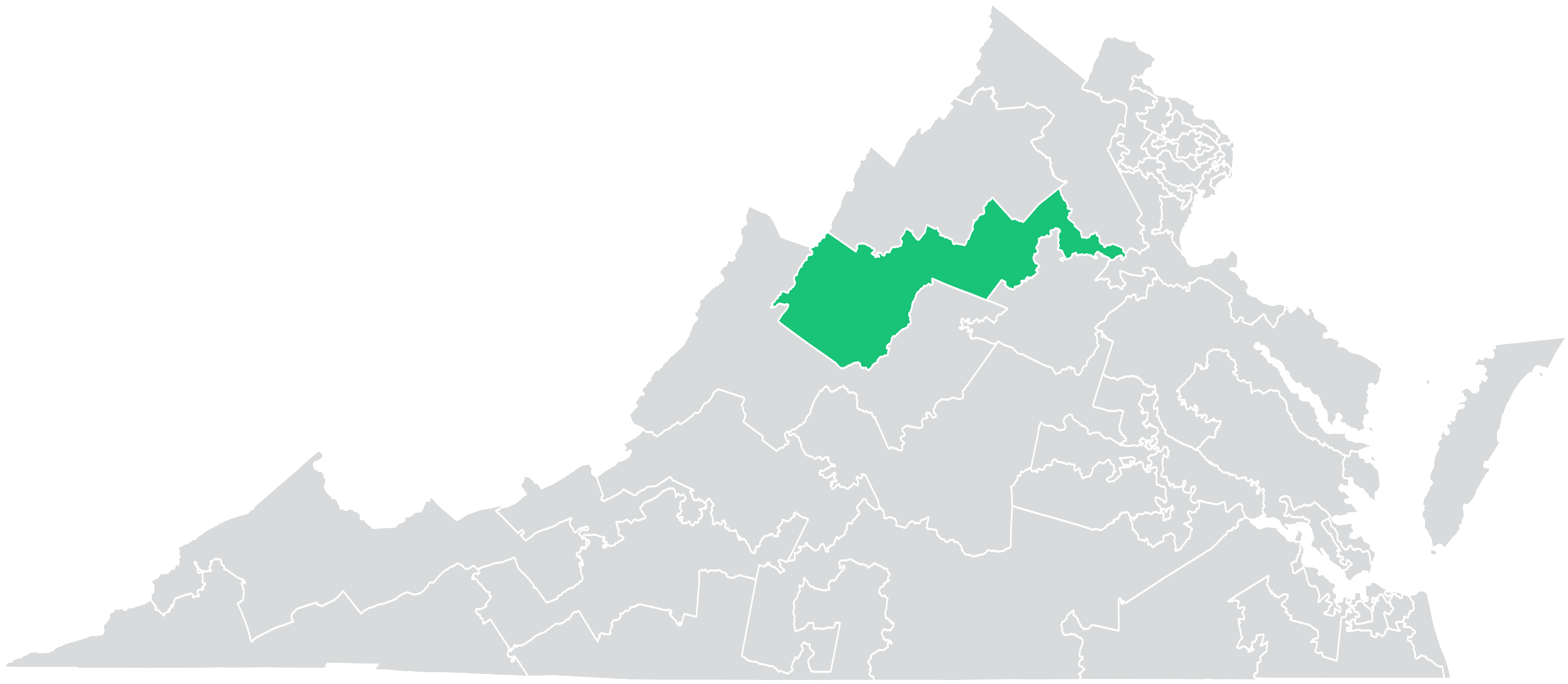
Senator
Danny Diggs; R–Yorktown
- Demographics: 54% White; 26% Black; 9% Hispanic; 4% Asian; 6% Other
- Population (2022): 209,075
- Registered voters: 149,651

Virginia's 24th Senate district is one of 40 districts in the Senate of Virginia. It has been represented by Republican Danny Diggs since 2024.

== Geography ==
District 24 is based in the Virginia Peninsula, including all of Poquoson, York County, and Williamsburg, as well as portions of James City County and Newport News.

The district overlaps with Virginia's 1st and 3rd congressional districts, and the 69th, 70th, 71st, 85th, and 86th districts of the Virginia House of Delegates.

== Recent election results ==
2023 Virginia Senate election, District 24
Party	Candidate	Votes	%
Republican	Danny Diggs	33,952	50.4
Democratic	Monty Mason	33,227	49.4
Total votes		67,322	100
Republican hold			

== Historic results ==
All election results below took place prior to 2021 redistricting, and thus were under different district lines, most recently within the Shenandoah Valley.

=== 2019 ===
2019 Virginia Senate election, District 24
Primary election
Party	Candidate	Votes	%
Republican	Emmett Hanger (incumbent)	11,146	57.6
Republican	Tina Freitas	8,216	42.4
Total votes		19,363	100
General election
Republican	Emmett Hanger (incumbent)	46,890	71.0
Democratic	Annette Hyde	18,733	28.4
Total votes		66,020	100
Republican hold			

=== 2015 ===
2015 Virginia Senate election, District 24
Primary election
Party	Candidate	Votes	%
Republican	Emmett Hanger (incumbent)	7,648	60.3
Republican	Daniel Moxley	3,491	27.5
Republican	Marshall Pattie	1,551	12.2
Total votes		12,690	100
General election
Republican	Emmett Hanger (incumbent)	34,980	97.9
Total votes		35,745	100
Republican hold			

=== 2011 ===
2011 Virginia Senate election, District 24
Party	Candidate	Votes	%
Republican	Emmett Hanger (incumbent)	29,617	98.5
Total votes		30,065	100
Republican hold			

=== Federal and statewide results ===
Year	Office	Results
2020	President	Trump 66.6–31.6%
2017	Governor	Gillespie 65.3–33.4%
2016	President	Trump 65.0–29.8%
2014	Senate	Gillespie 65.5–31.6%
2013	Governor	Cuccinelli 61.6–31.0%
2012	President	Romney 63.4–35.0%
2012	Senate	Allen 64.3–35.7%

=== 2007 ===
2007 Virginia Senate election, District 24
Primary election
Party	Candidate	Votes	%
Republican	Emmett Hanger (incumbent)	7,619	46.2
Republican	Scott Sayre	6,753	40.9
Republican	Jill Vogel	1,361	8.3
Republican	Mark Tate	762	4.6
Total votes		16,495	100
General election
Republican	Emmett Hanger (incumbent)	23,896	65.4
Democratic	R. David Cox	9,757	26.7
Libertarian	Arin Sime	2,857	7.8
Total votes		36,556	100
Republican hold			

=== 2003 ===
2003 Virginia Senate election, District 24
Party	Candidate	Votes	%
Republican	Emmett Hanger (incumbent)	25,548	71.7
Democratic	Steven Sisson	10,028	28.2
Total votes		35,612	100
Republican hold			

=== 1999 ===
1999 Virginia Senate election, District 24
Party	Candidate	Votes	%
Republican	Emmett Hanger (incumbent)	20,373	99.6
Total votes		20,456	100
Republican hold			

=== 1995 ===
1995 Virginia Senate election, District 24
Party	Candidate	Votes	%
Republican	Emmett Hanger	22,976	50.9
Democratic	Frank W. Nolen (incumbent)	20,909	46.3
Independent	Elise Sheffield	1,247	2.8
Total votes		45,134	100
Republican gain from Democratic			
