= Virginia's 61st House of Delegates district =

Virginia legislative district

District map from the 2023 election

Virginia's 61st House of Delegates district elects one of 100 seats in the Virginia House of Delegates, the lower house of Virginia's bicameral state legislature. District 61 represents Rappahannock County as well as parts of Culpeper and Fauquier counties. The seat is currently held by Republican Michael Webert.

== District officeholders ==
Years	Delegate	Party	Electoral history
January 1994 – December 2000	Frank Ruff	Republican	Resigned after being elected to the Virginia Senate.
December 2000 – January 2024	Thomas C. Wright	Republican	Redistricted to the 50th district
January 2024 – present	Michael Webert	Republican	Redistricted from the 18th district
