= Stephen Newman =

American politician from Virginia

President pro tempore of the Virginia Senate
- In office January 13, 2016 – January 8, 2020
- Preceded by: Walter Stosch
- Succeeded by: Louise Lucas

Member of the Virginia Senate from the 23rd district
- In office January 10, 1996 – January 10, 2024
- Preceded by: Elliot Schewel
- Succeeded by: Mark Peake (Redistricting)

Member of the Virginia House of Delegates from the 23rd district
- In office January 8, 1992 – January 10, 1996
- Preceded by: Edward Harris
- Succeeded by: Preston Bryant

Personal details
- Born: Stephen Dwayne Newman; October 15, 1964 (age 61) Stuart, Virginia, U.S.
- Party: Republican
- Spouse: Kim
- Children: 2
- Education: Central Virginia Community College; Lynchburg College
- Website: Official website

Stephen Dwayne Newman (born October 15, 1964) is an American politician of the Republican Party. He served in the Virginia General Assembly from 1991 to 2024, first in the House (1991-1996) and then in the Senate of Virginia (1996–2024). In 2016, Newman became president pro tempore of the Senate of Virginia. However, in the 2019 Virginia Senate election, although Newman won re-election from his district, Democrats won the majority. On January 8, 2020, Louise Lucas, a senior Democratic senator succeeded Newman as president pro tempore.

== Early life and education ==
Newman was born on October 15, 1964, in Stuart, Virginia. His family later moved to Rustburg, Virginia, where he attended Liberty Christian Academy. Newman then attended Central Virginia Community College and Lynchburg College.

== Career ==
Newman spent four years as a member of the Lynchburg City Council before being elected to the Virginia House of Delegates. He was a member of the House of Delegates from 1992 to 1996, and was elected to the Virginia Senate in 1995. He represents Senate District 23, which includes all of Botetourt and Craig counties and parts of Campbell County, Bedford County, Roanoke County, and Lynchburg City. His district is a safe Republican seat.

Newman is chair of the Senate Committee on Education and Health. Over his decades in the state legislature, Newman gained a reputation as a staunch conservative and a member with a talent for consensus-seeking and negotiation. In 2006, he was a sponsor of the Marshall-Newman Amendment, which banned same-sex marriage in Virginia. He opposed Medicaid expansion in Virginia. He opposed 2014 legislation to decriminalize marijuana in Virginia.

In January 2016, Newman was elected president pro tempore of the Senate of Virginiaand held that position until the 2020 General Assembly session began. The main duty of the pro tem is to preside over the state Senate when the lieutenant governor of Virginia (who is the president of the Senate) is unable to do so.

Virginia House of Delegates
Preceded by Edward Harris	Member of the Virginia House of Delegates from the 23rd district 1992–1996	Succeeded by Preston Bryant
Senate of Virginia
Preceded by Elliot Schewel	Member of the Virginia Senate from the 23rd district 1996–2024	Succeeded by Mamie Locke
Preceded by Walter Stosch	President pro tempore of the Virginia Senate; 2016–2020	Succeeded by Louise Lucas
