= W. Henry Maxwell =

American politician (1935–2010)

Member of the Virginia Senate from the 2nd district
- In office January 13, 1993 – January 14, 2004
- Preceded by: Bobby Scott
- Succeeded by: Mamie Locke

Member of the Virginia House of Delegates from the 95th district
- In office January 12, 1983 – January 13, 1993
- Preceded by: None (district created)
- Succeeded by: Flora D. Crittenden

Personal details
- Born: Walter Henry Maxwell; April 3, 1935 Reidsville, North Carolina
- Died: November 13, 2010 (aged 75) Detroit, Michigan
- Party: Democratic
- Spouse: Gladys Mae Jones
- Education: Norfolk State University; Virginia State University; Virginia Seminary and College
- Profession: Minister

Walter Henry Maxwell, Sr. (April 3, 1935 – November 13, 2010) was an American politician and Baptist minister from Newport News, Virginia. A Democrat, he served in the Virginia House of Delegates 1983–1993 and the Senate of Virginia 1993–2004.

== Early life, education, career ==
Maxwell was born April 3, 1935, in Reidsville, North Carolina, and raised in Newport News. Maxwell graduated from George Washington Carver High School in 1951. He then attended Norfolk State University and Virginia State University, and earned a Bachelor of Theology degree from Virginia Seminary and College. The same school awarded him a Doctor of Theology degree in 1974.

In 1957, he married the former Gladys Mae Jones, and they had three children: Walter Jr., Ronald, and Angela. Maxwell was for many years the minister of Ivy Baptist Church in Newport News.

== Political career ==
After the 1980 census, the Virginia House of Delegates switched entirely to single-member districts, after a year of legislative and legal wrangling. Incumbent Democratic Delegate Bobby Scott was elected in November 1982 to the new 95th district. Before taking office in the new seat, Scott won a December special election to fill a vacancy in the 2nd Senate district. The Democratic Party nominated Maxwell to replace Scott, and on January 11, 1983, he defeated Republican James W. Parker, getting 83.8% of the vote. The following November Maxwell won a full House term, gaining 74.5% of the vote against two independents.

Maxwell was reelected without opposition in 1985 and 1989. In 1987 and 1991, he defeated independent candidates, getting more than 80% of the vote each time.

While in the House, he served on the committees on the Chesapeake and Its Tributaries, Claims, Conservation and Natural Resources, and Health, Welfare, and Institutions.

In November 1992, Scott was elected to the United States House of Representatives. Maxwell was again nominated to fill Scott's vacancy, this time in the state Senate. On December 15, 1992, Maxwell won a four-way special election in the 2nd district, getting 39.1% of the votes, against 31.5% for Republican city councilman James O. West, 24.8% for former Newport News Mayor Jessie M. Rattley, and 4.5% for independent Joyce B. Hobson.Flora D. Crittenden won the special election in 1993 to succeed him as delegate.

Maxwell was unopposed for reelection to the Senate in 1995. In 1999, he received 80% of the vote against independent Michael A. Rogers, Sr. Senator Maxwell served on the Committees on Rehabilitation and Social Services, Commerce and Labor, General Laws, and Transportation.

Maxwell did not seek reelection in 2003 due to health issues.

== Death ==
Maxwell died of complications from diabetes and Parkinson's disease on November 13, 2010, while staying with his daughter near Detroit, Michigan. He was buried in Hampton, Virginia.

Virginia House of Delegates
Preceded by newly created district	Virginia House of Delegates, 95th District; 1983–1993	Succeeded by Flora D. Crittenden
Senate of Virginia
Preceded by Bobby Scott	Virginia Senate, District 2; 1993–2004	Succeeded by Mamie Locke
