= L. Louise Lucas =

American politician (born 1944)

Louise Lucas
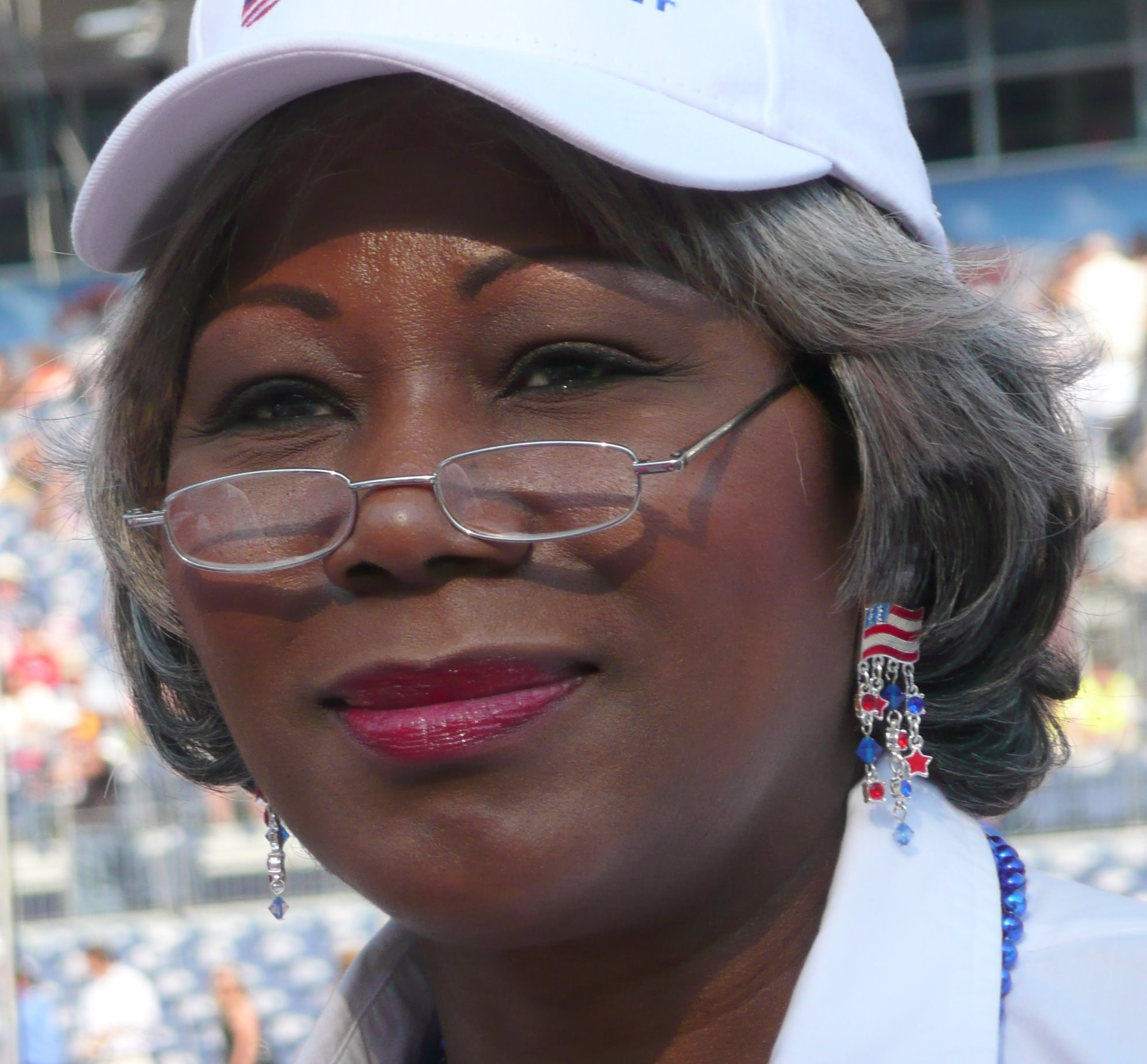
- Lucas in 2008

President pro tempore of the Virginia Senate
- Incumbent
- Assumed office January 8, 2020
- Preceded by: Stephen Newman

Member of the Virginia Senate from the 18th district
- Incumbent
- Assumed office January 8, 1992
- Preceded by: Howard Anderson

Personal details
- Born: Lillie Louise Boone; January 22, 1944 (age 82) Portsmouth, Virginia, U.S.
- Party: Democratic
- Spouse: Otis Lucas
- Education: Norfolk State University (BS, MA)
- Website: Campaign website

Lillie Louise Lucas (née Boone; born January 22, 1944) is an American politician serving as a Virginia state senator, representing the 18th District in the southeast region of the state since 1992. After Democrats won a majority of seats in the 2019 Virginia Senate election, Lucas succeeded Republican Stephen Newman as the Virginia Senate's president pro tempore. She is the first woman and first African American to hold that office. She also chairs the Committee on Finance and Appropriations, the first African American in that role. She has been identified as one of the most powerful political figures in the state.

== Early and family life ==
Lillie Louise Boone was born in Portsmouth, Virginia. She attended Portsmouth public schools including during their shutdown during Massive Resistance. She graduated from I.C. Norcom High School. Lucas attended Norfolk State University, graduating cum laude with a Bachelor of Science in Vocational-Industrial Education in 1976. She earned a Master of Arts, graduating magna cum laude, in Urban Affairs with a concentration in Human Resources Planning and Administration in 1982.

== Career ==
Lucas began a federal government career in 1967, aged 23, as an apprentice shipfitter at the Norfolk Naval Shipyard (NNSY), becoming the first female shipfitter there in July 1971. She served as engineering draftsman and naval architect technician. Lucas later became the Command Federal Women's Program Manager at the Commander in Chief, U.S. Atlantic Fleet (CINCLANTFLT) and Equal Employment Manager at the Supervisor of Shipbuilding Conversion and Repair (SUPSHIP).

In 1985, she left federal service and became Interim Executive Director of the Southeastern Tidewater Opportunity Project (STOP). She was appointed executive director of STOP in 1986 and held that position until 1992. By that time, federal government defense downsizing was affecting the community, and many former shipyard workers needed retraining. She joined her alma mater, Norfolk State, as an assistant professor coordinating research efforts and with a special interest in securing federal funding for retraining efforts.

From 1992 to 1994, Lucas served as Congressional Liaison for Sponsored Program at Old Dominion University. From 1994 to 1998, she was assistant professor, Department of Academic Affairs and Special Assistant to the Vice President for University Advancement at her alma mater, Norfolk State University. She is President/CEO of Lucas Lodge, Lucas Transportation, Portsmouth Day Support Program and Southside Direct Care Provider organizations operating in The Lucas Professional Center located in Portsmouth.

In July 2021, Lucas opened the Cannabis Outlet, a cannabis store in Portsmouth, Virginia. A 2022 investigation by the Virginia Mercury revealed that Lucas's cannabis store was selling products that contained quantities of delta-9 THC, a substance that is illegal to sell in Virginia. Lab testing found that 65 of the 66 products sold by Lucas's store were mislabeled.

== Political career ==
A longtime civic activist, Lucas began her formal political career in June 1984 by becoming the first African American woman to serve on the Portsmouth City Council. Lucas was first elected to the Virginia General Assembly in November 1991. As a state senator she has a seat on the following Virginia Senate Committees: Education & Health, Courts of Justice, Finance (which she chairs), Local Government and Rules. She is member of the Finance Sub-committee on Claims, Finance Sub-committee on Economic Development/Natural Resources, Finance Sub-Committee on Public Safety, and Education Sub-committee on Health Licensing.

Lucas was Chairwoman of the Senate Local Government Committee and a former member of Committees on Agriculture, Conservation and Natural Resources; Rehabilitation and Social Services; Transportation; former chairwoman, Education and Health Special Sub-committee on Public Smoking Legislation; Sub-committee on Mental Health Legislation; Special Sub-committee on Immigration. Lucas was the Democratic candidate to replace U.S. Congressman Norman Sisisky in the 2001 special election, following Sisisky's death in office. Republican Randy Forbes won the general election.

In 2008, two companies which Lucas controlled applied for Empowerment Zone bonds to build a conference center in Portsmouth. The Portsmouth city council refused to issue the bonds, on a 3–2 vote with two council members who had a financial interest in the project abstaining. The companies, still controlled by Lucas, later filed a $97.7 million suit against the City of Portsmouth and the council members voting against the bonds and the City Attorney, claiming racial discrimination against because they were led and funded mostly by African-Americans. After the proposal was later reconsidered and again denied, the lawsuit was dropped.

Lucas served on the Governor's Commission on Government Reform and Restructuring, Governor's Commission on State Funding for Public School Construction and the Governor's Commission on Information Technology. In 2010, she was appointed to the Commission on Electric Utility Regulation. In 2012, she was appointed to the Federal Action Contingency Trust Fund committee and in 2013 was appointed to the Medicaid Innovation and Reform Commission. She is an active member of the Virginia Legislative Black Caucus and elected vice-chair of Outreach by the Democratic Party of Virginia.

Lucas has served on various community boards, commissions, civic and service organizations such as Past President NAACP (also Golden Heritage Member); Martin Luther King Leadership Steering Committee (also Charter Member) and the Norfolk State University Alumni Association. Lucas is also a member of the following organizations: Delta Sigma Theta sorority (Golden Life status); The Links, Incorporated (Portsmouth Chapter); Order of Eastern Star (Brighton Light Chapter 118), Prince Hall Freemasonry of Virginia, National Women's Political Caucus, National Council of Christians and Jews.

On August 17, 2020, Portsmouth's police chief Angela Greene charged Lucas with two felonies for an incident during protests at Portsmouth's Confederate monument on June 10. In early July, Lucas had filed a civil defamation case against Virginia Beach lawyer Tim Anderson, based on his social media posts and interviews about the incident. On November 16, 2020, Richmond judge Claire Cardwell (sitting by appointment of the Virginia Supreme Court because local Portsmouth judges recused themselves) accepted the motion of the city's elected Commonwealth's Attorney, Stephanie Morales, to dismiss the criminal charges as based upon insufficient evidence, including of intent.

Police chief Greene had been placed on leave after filing the charges (usually the responsibility of the local Commonwealth Attorney), and fired by the acting city manager on November 16, 2020. Virginia governor Ralph Northam and the American Civil Liberties Union, among others, had condemned the criminal charges as excessive and discriminatory, while Rich Anderson, head of the Republican Party of Virginia, said that Lucas should turn herself in.

On July 2, 2021, Chesapeake Circuit Court Chief Judge John W. Brown dismissed a motion accompanied by a 4,600-voter petition circulated by the Virginia Tea Party, which sought to invoke a law allowing for 10% of voters to petition for the judicial removal of state officials; the judge remarked that under Virginia's constitution, only the state Senate could expel one of its members. Following mediation, the city of Portsmouth agreed on December 23, 2021, to pay Lucas $300,000 in exchange for dismissal of her civil lawsuit which initially asked for $6.75 million in damages for malicious prosecution, false imprisonment and gross negligence in the matter.

In June 2023, Lucas won the Democratic primary to retain her seat, despite redistricting which placed her in the same district as another veteran state senator, Lionell Spruill. In the Senate election on November 7, 2023, she won re-election against Republican challenger Tony Goodwin.

During the 2024 legislative session, Lucas blocked approval of taxpayer funding for a new sports arena in the Potomac Yard area of Alexandria, Virginia proposed by Ted Leonsis and Virginia Governor Glenn Youngkin. Lucas criticized the arena proposal, whose costs were estimated between $2 billion (by supporters) and $5 billion (by critics), for requiring the state to stand behind $1.5 billion in bonds regardless of the arena's financial success or failure.

Lucas is credited with leading Virginia to adopt a gerrymandered Congressional map that would give Democrats 10 out of 11 seats in response to Republican efforts to further gerrymander other states. She fired back at Senator Ted Cruz of Texas when he criticized Virginia's 10-1 map as a "brazen abuse of power" with this statement: "You all started it and we f**king finished it." The map would later be struck down by the Virginia Supreme Court.

On May 6, 2026, the FBI executed search warrants of Lucas's office and a nearby cannabis dispensary as part of a corruption investigation. On October 22, she was indicted in the Eastern District of Virginia alongside six other co-defendants accused of running an illegal cannabis enterprise and money laundering.

== Personal life ==
Lucas is the mother of two daughters, Lisa L. Lucas-Burke and Theresa Lynn Lucas-Lamb, who partner with her in various business entities. She had one son, Jeffery Lee Lucas, who died in a car accident when his car swerved into oncoming traffic. Her husband, Otis M. Lucas, who remarried after their divorce, also worked for various Lucas entities before his death in 2014.

She has five grandchildren, and three great-grandchildren. Lisa L. Lucas-Burke, educated in the Portsmouth Public Schools and with two degrees from Norfolk State University, is a member of the Portsmouth City Council, and was vice-mayor from 2010 to 2020. In 2021, she was one of the Library of Virginia and Dominion Energy's Strong Men & Women in Virginia History honorees.

Senate of Virginia
Preceded by Stephen Newman	President pro tempore of the Virginia Senate; 2020–present	Incumbent
