= Mamie Locke =

American politician and educator

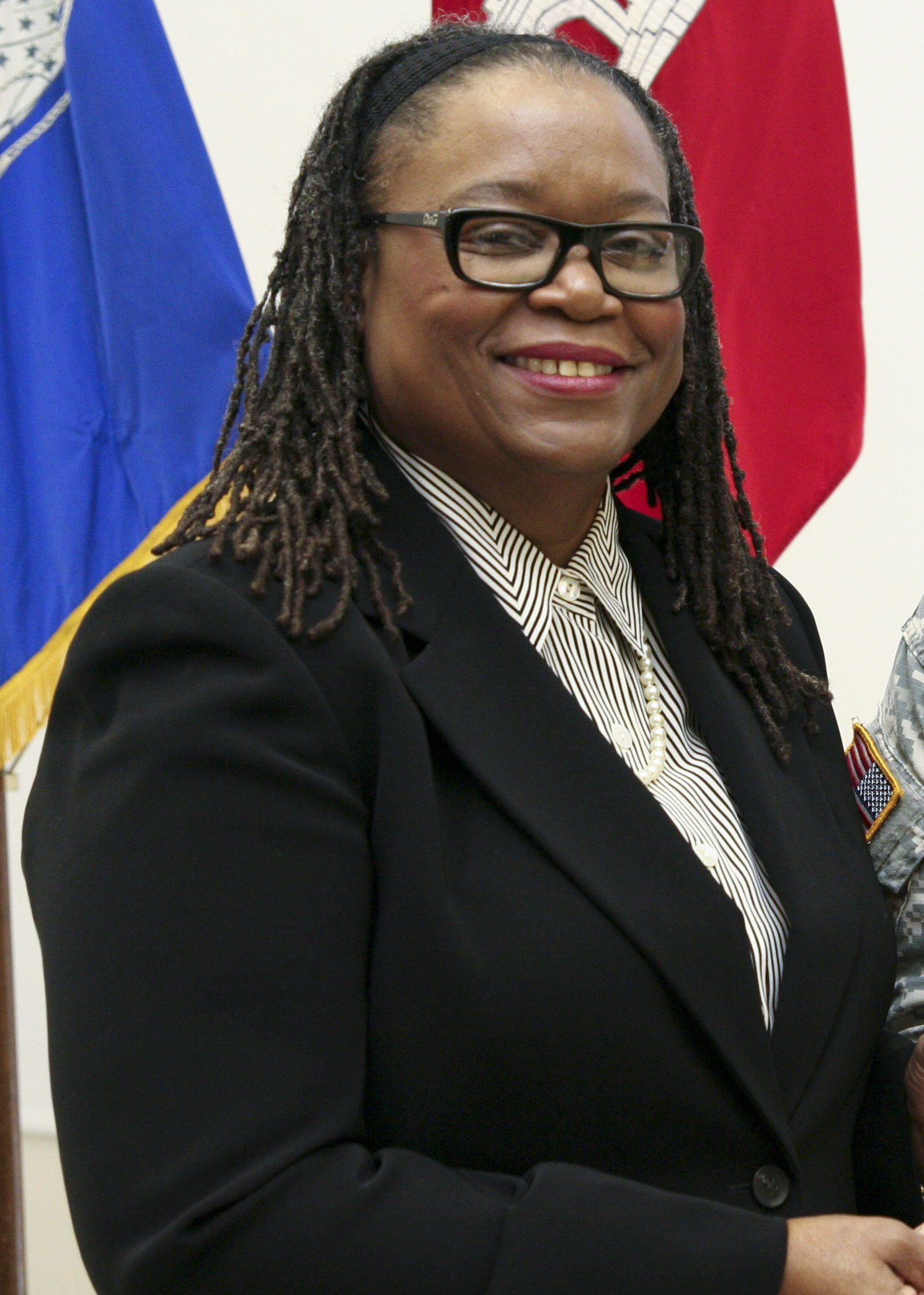

Member of the Virginia Senate
- Incumbent
- Assumed office January 14, 2004
- Preceded by: Henry Maxwell
- Constituency: 2nd District (2004–2024); 23rd District (since 2024)

Mayor of Hampton
- In office July 1, 2000 – January 14, 2004
- Preceded by: Joseph Spencer
- Succeeded by: Charles Wornom

Personal details
- Born: March 19, 1954 (age 72) Brandon, Mississippi, U.S.
- Party: Democratic
- Education: Tougaloo College (BA); Clark Atlanta University (MA, PhD)
- Website: Campaign website

Mamie Evelyn Locke (born March 19, 1954) is an American politician and educator. A Democrat, she was a member of the Hampton, Virginia city council 1996–2004, and mayor 2000–2004. Since 2004, she has been a member of the Senate of Virginia, serving initially from the 2nd district; since 2024 she has served from the 23rd district. She currently represents parts of the cities of Hampton, Newport News and Portsmouth, plus part of York County. She is also a Professor of Political Science and was Dean of the School of Liberal Arts at Hampton University.

== Education ==
Locke received a B.A. degree in history and political science from Tougaloo College in 1976. She then attended Atlanta University for advanced political science studies, receiving an M.A. in 1978 and a Ph.D. in 1984. She also completed a program in Middle Eastern studies at the American University in Cairo in 1986.

== Political career ==
Locke was first elected to Hampton City Council in 1996. The council chose her as Vice Mayor in 1998 and Mayor in 2000. She was the first African American mayor of Hampton.

In 2003, she won a three-way Democratic primary for the 2nd Senate district nomination with 48.11% of the vote. She then won the general election over Republican P. K. Bomersheim and independent J. B. Hobson with 64.75%.

In 2007, Locke was unopposed in her re-election bid. In 2011, she defeated Republican Tom E. Harmon IV with 65.39% of the vote.

== Personal life ==
Locke is Catholic.

== Notes ==
Senate of Virginia
Preceded by Henry Maxwell	Member of the Virginia Senate from the 2nd district 2004–2024	Succeeded by Mark Obenshain
Preceded by Stephen Newman	Member of the Virginia Senate from the 23rd district 2024–Present	Incumbent
