= Virginia's 2nd Senate district =

American legislative district

Virginia's 2nd State Senate district
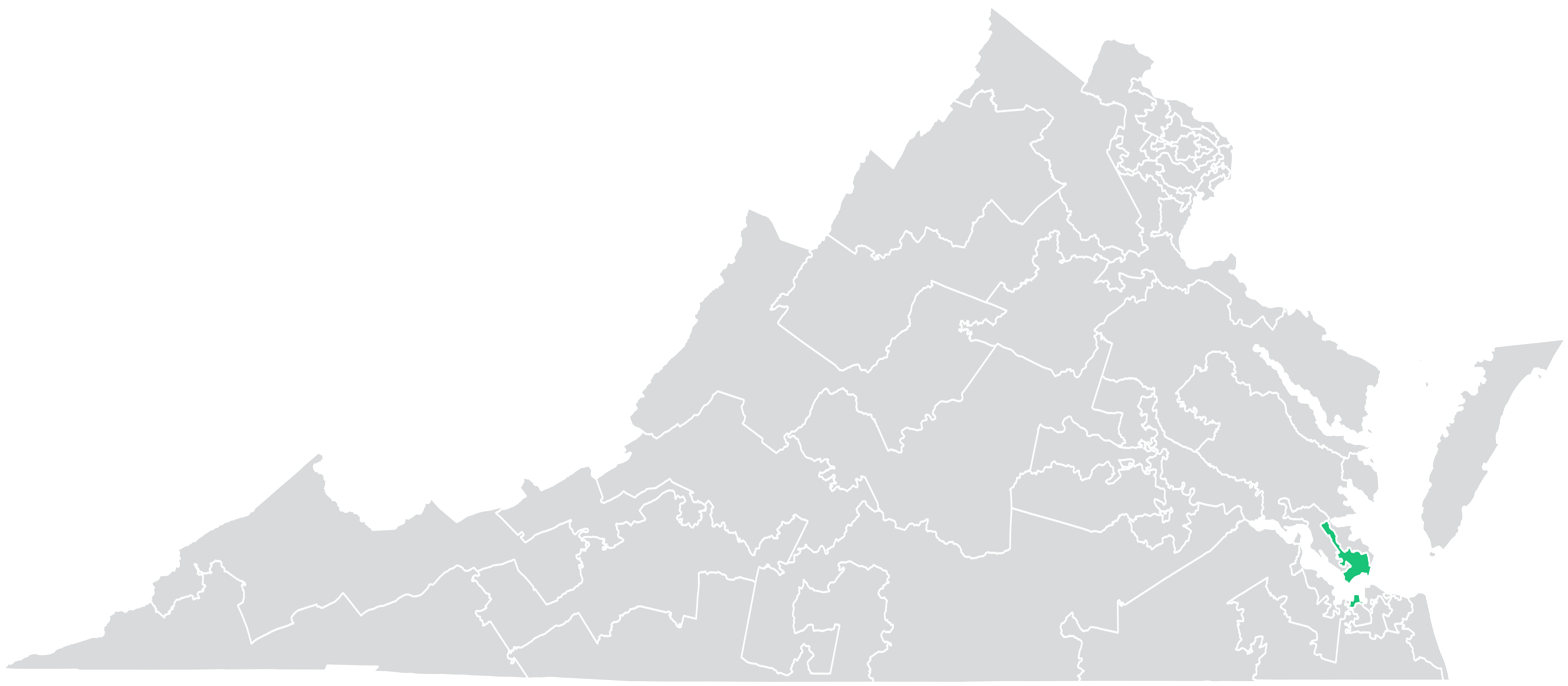
Senator
| Mark Obenshain; R–Harrisonburg |
- Demographics: 82% White; 4% Black; 9% Hispanic; 1% Asian; 1% Other
- Population (2019): 216,089
- Registered voters: 134,912

Virginia's 2nd Senate district is one of 40 districts in the Senate of Virginia. It has been represented by Republican Mark Obenshain since 2024. After the most recent redistricting, three senators were drawn into the same district. Mark Obenshain ran for reelection while Emmett Hanger retired and Creigh Deeds moved to a neighboring district.

== Geography ==
District 2 is located in the rural western area of Virginia, including all of Rockingham County, Page County, Bath County, and Highland County. It also includes the City of Harrisonburg and part of Augusta County.

The district is located entirely within Virginia's 6th Congressional District.

== Recent election results ==
=== 2023 ===
2023 Virginia Senate election, District 2
| Party | Candidate | Votes | % |
|---|---|---|---|
| Republican | Mark Obenshain (incumbent) | 39,770 | 69.4 |
| Democratic | Kathy Beery | 16,398 | 28.6 |
| Libertarian | Joshua Huffman | 1,108 | 1.9 |
| Total votes | | 57,336 | 100 |
| Republican hold | | | |

=== 2019 ===
2019 Virginia Senate election, District 2
| Party | Candidate | Votes | % |
|---|---|---|---|
| Democratic | Mamie Locke (incumbent) | 36,551 | 92.8 |
| Total votes | | 39,390 | 100 |
| Democratic hold | | | |

=== 2015 ===
2015 Virginia Senate election, District 2
| Party | Candidate | Votes | % |
|---|---|---|---|
| Democratic | Mamie Locke (incumbent) | 17,459 | 100 |
| Total votes | | 17,459 | 100 |
| Democratic hold | | | |

=== 2011 ===
2011 Virginia Senate election, District 2
| Party | Candidate | Votes | % |
|---|---|---|---|
| Democratic | Mamie Locke (incumbent) | 17,526 | 65.6 |
| Republican | Thomas Harmon, IV | 9,208 | 34.4 |
| Total votes | | 26,734 | 100 |
| Democratic hold | | | |

=== Federal and statewide results ===
| Year | Office | Results | | | |
|---|---|---|---|---|---|
| 2020 | President | Biden 72.1–26.1% | | | |
| 2021 | Governor | Youngkin 72.0–27.0% | 2017 | Governor | Northam 72.0–27.0% |
| 2016 | President | Clinton 67.9–27.8% | | | |
| 2014 | Senate | Warner 68.6–29.6% | | | |
| 2013 | Governor | McAuliffe 67.5–27.8% | | | |
| 2012 | President | Obama 71.7–27.2% | | | |
| 2012 | Senate | Kaine 71.9–28.1% | | | |

== Historical results ==
All election results below took place prior to 2011 redistricting, and thus were under different district lines.

=== 2007 ===
2007 Virginia Senate election, District 2
| Party | Candidate | Votes | % |
|---|---|---|---|
| Democratic | Mamie Locke (incumbent) | 12,242 | 94.1 |
| Total votes | | 13,014 | 100 |
| Democratic hold | | | |

=== 2003 ===
2003 Virginia Senate election, District 2
Primary election
| Party | Candidate | Votes | % |
|---|---|---|---|
| Democratic | Mamie Locke | 6,278 | 48.1 |
| Democratic | Verbena M. Askew | 6,093 | 46.7 |
| Democratic | J. E. Graves | 679 | 5.2 |
| Total votes | | 13,050 | 100 |
General election
| Democratic | Mamie Locke | 12,784 | 64.7 |
| Republican | Phil Bomersheim | 4,805 | 24.3 |
| Independent | J.B. Hobson | 2,116 | 10.7 |
| Total votes | | 19,744 | 100 |
| Democratic hold | | | |

=== 1999 ===
1999 Virginia Senate election, District 2
| Party | Candidate | Votes | % |
|---|---|---|---|
| Democratic | W. Henry Maxwell (incumbent) | 14,545 | 80.3 |
| Independent | M. A. Rogers, Sr. | 3,475 | 19.2 |
| Total votes | | 18,123 | 100 |
| Democratic hold | | | |

=== 1995 ===
1995 Virginia Senate election, District 2
| Party | Candidate | Votes | % |
|---|---|---|---|
| Democratic | W. Henry Maxwell (incumbent) | 18,836 | 99.9 |
| Total votes | | 18,851 | 100 |
| Democratic hold | | | |

== District officeholders since 1940 ==
| Years | Senator, District 2 | Counties/Cities in District |
|---|---|---|
| 1940–1944 | Vivian L. Page (D); Ralph Hunter Daughton (D) | City of Norfolk |
| 1944 | Ralph Hunter Daughton (D); James Hoge Tyler, III (D) | City of Norfolk |
| 1945–1948 | James Hoge Tyler, III (D); Edward L. Breeden (D) | City of Norfolk |
| 1948–1952 | Edward L. Breeden (D); Robert F. Baldwin (D) | City of Norfolk |
| 1952–1956 | Edward L. Breeden (D); Robert F. Baldwin (D) | City of Norfolk |
| 1956–1960 | Edward L. Breeden (D); Robert F. Baldwin (D) | City of Norfolk |
| 1960–1964 | Edward L. Breeden (D); Robert F. Baldwin (D) | City of Norfolk |
| 1964–1966 | Edward L. Breeden (D); Robert F. Baldwin (D) | City of Norfolk |
| 1966–1968 | Edward L. Breeden (D); Robert F. Baldwin (D); Henry Howell (D) | City of Norfolk |
| 1968–1972 | Edward L. Breeden (D); Henry Howell (D); Peter K. Babalas (D) | City of Norfolk |
| 1972–1976 | Herbert H. Bateman (D) | City of Newport News (part) |
| 1976–1980 | Herbert H. Bateman (R) | City of Newport News (part) |
| 1980–1983 | Herbert H. Bateman (R) | City of Newport News (part) |
| 1983–1984 | Bobby Scott (D) | City of Newport News (part), City of Hampton (part) |
| 1984–1988 | Bobby Scott (D) | City of Newport News (part), City of Hampton (part) |
| 1988–1992 | Bobby Scott (D) | City of Newport News (part), City of Hampton (part) |
| 1992–1996 | W. Henry Maxwell (D) | City of Newport News (part), City of Hampton (part) |
| 1996–2000 | W. Henry Maxwell (D) | City of Newport News (part), City of Hampton (part) |
| 2000–2004 | W. Henry Maxwell (D) | City of Newport News (part), City of Hampton (part) |
| 2004–2008 | Mamie Locke (D) | City of Hampton (part), City of Newport News (part), City of Portsmouth (part), City of Suffolk (part) |
| 2008–2012 | Mamie Locke (D) | City of Hampton (part), City of Newport News (part), City of Portsmouth (part), City of Suffolk (part) |
| 2012–2016 | Mamie Locke (D) | York County (part), City of Hampton (part), City of Newport News (part), City of Portsmouth (part) |
| 2016–present | Mamie Locke (D) | York County (part), City of Hampton (part), City of Newport News (part), City of Portsmouth (part) |
