= 2026 United States Senate election in Virginia =

- November 3, 2026
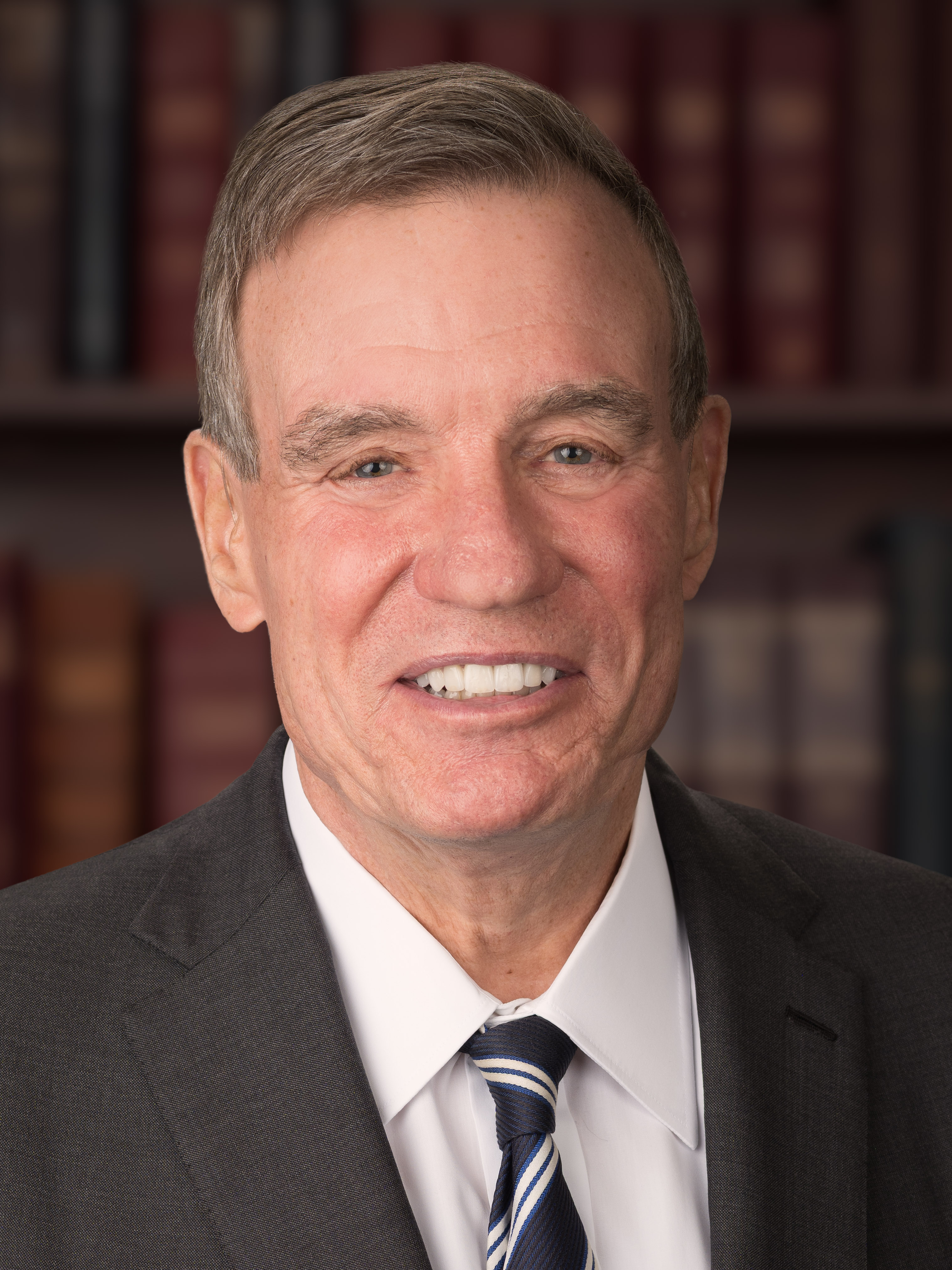

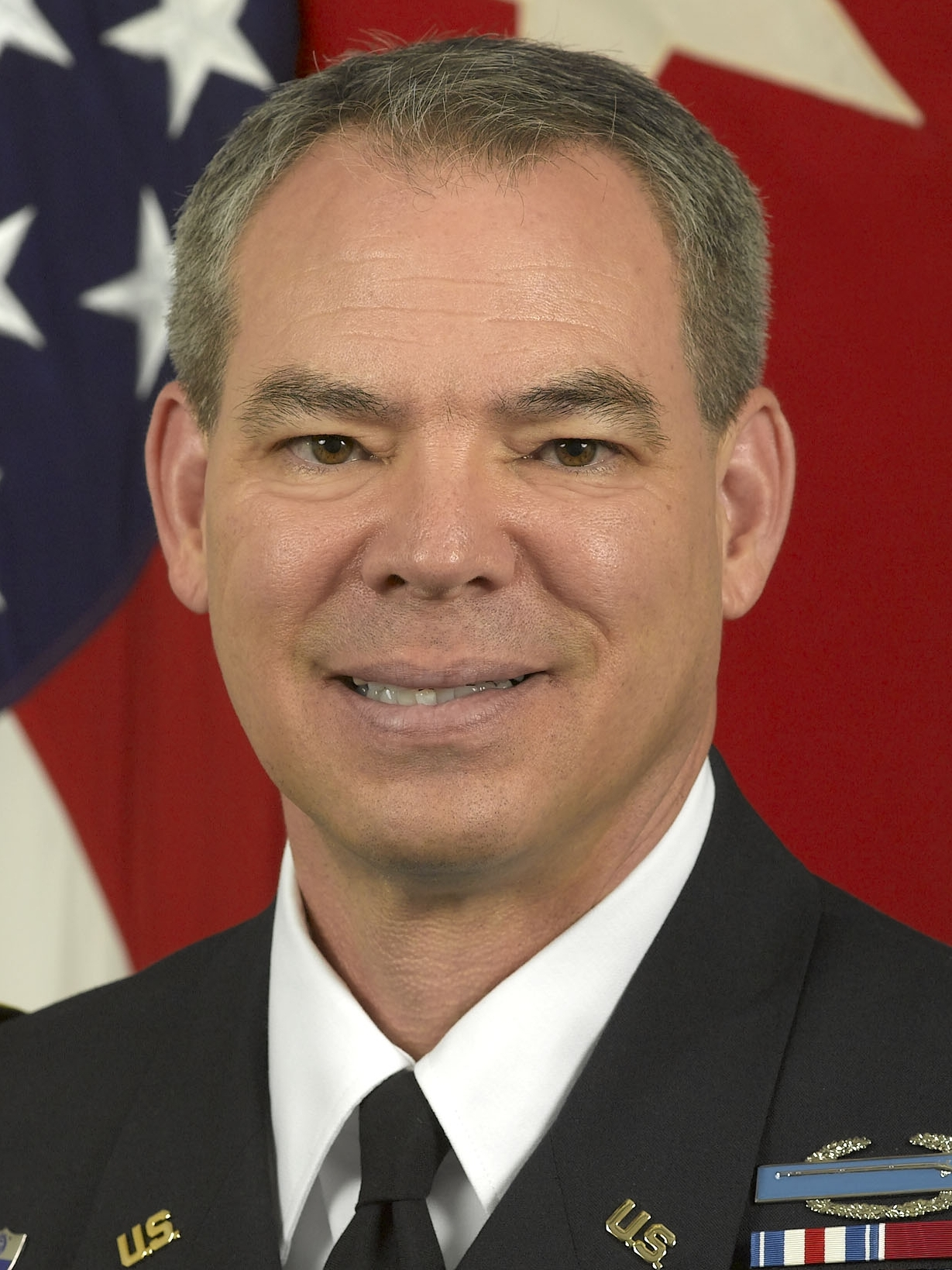
| Nominee | Mark Warner | Bert Mizusawa |
| Party | Democratic | Republican |
| Popular vote | 2,251,628 | 1,393,710 |
| Percentage | 61.60% | 38.13% |
- Warner: 50–60% 60–70% 70–80% 80–90% >90% Mizusawa: 50–60% 60–70% 70–80%
U.S. senator before election
Mark Warner
Democratic
Elected U.S. senator
Mark Warner
Democratic

The 2026 United States Senate election in Virginia was held on November 3, 2026, to elect a member of the United States Senate to represent the Commonwealth of Virginia. Democratic incumbent Mark Warner was re-elected to a fourth term, defeating Republican Army general Bert Mizusawa.

In the August 4 primary elections, Warner was unopposed for the Democratic nomination. Mizusawa won the Republican nomination with 51.5% of the vote over Marine Corps Reserves officer David Williams and financial accountant Kim Farington.

Warner won the general election, with major news organizations immediately declaring him the victor when polls in the state closed at 7:00 PM. Furthermore, he won by his highest margin since his first election in 2008. This was also the first Senate election in Virginia since that year where any candidate broke 60% of the vote.

== Democratic primary ==
=== Candidates ===
==== Nominee ====
- Mark Warner, incumbent U.S. senator (2009–present)

==== Withdrawn ====
- Lorita Daniels, Spotsylvania County school board member
- Gregory Eichelberger, Army Adjutant General Corps Reserve 2nd Lieutenant
- Mark Moran, former investment banker and reality TV star (ran as an independent)
- Jason Reynolds, IT professional

=== Endorsements ===
Mark Warner

U.S. senators

- Tim Kaine, Virginia (2013–present)

U.S. representatives

- Don Beyer, VA-08 (2015–present)
- Jennifer McClellan, VA-04 (2023–present)
- Bobby Scott, VA-03 (1993–present)
- Suhas Subramanyam, VA-10 (2025–present)
- Eugene Vindman, VA-07 (2025–present)
- James Walkinshaw, VA-11 (2025–present)

Statewide officials

- Ghazala Hashmi, lieutenant governor of Virginia (2026–present)
- Jay Jones, attorney general of Virginia (2026–present)
- Abigail Spanberger, governor of Virginia (2026–present)

State legislators

- Don Scott, speaker of the Virginia House of Delegates (2024–present) from HD-88 (2020–present)
- 18 state senators
- 62 state delegates

Organizations

- AIPAC
- Brady Campaign
- Jewish Democratic Council of America
- Joint Action Committee for Political Affairs
- Planned Parenthood Action Fund
- Population Connection

=== Fundraising ===
Campaign finance reports as of June 30, 2026
| Candidate | Raised | Spent | Cash on hand |
|---|---|---|---|
| Lorita Daniels (D) | $57,159 | $50,121 | $7,038 |
| Gregory Eichelberger (D) | $5,698 | $5,698 | $0 |
| Mark Warner (D) | $25,160,577 | $9,434,262 | $16,114,725 |
Source: Federal Election Commission

== Republican primary ==
=== Candidates ===
==== Nominee ====
- Bert Mizusawa, retired United States Army major general, candidate for U.S. Senate in 2018, and candidate for VA-02 in 2010

==== Eliminated in primary ====
- Kim Farington, financial accountant
- David Williams, U.S. Marine Corps Reserves colonel

==== Withdrawn ====
- Alex De Paula, former nonprofit executive
- Aldous Mina, economic development consultant and independent candidate for this seat in 2020
- Bryce Reeves, state senator from SD-28 (2012–present) (endorsed Mizusawa)
- Chuck Smith, attorney and nominee for Virginia's 3rd congressional district in 2010, and perennial candidate

==== Declined ====
- Jason Miyares, former attorney general of Virginia (2022–2026)
- Glenn Youngkin, former governor of Virginia (2022–2026)

=== Endorsements ===
Bert Mizusawa

U.S. representatives

- Ben Cline, VA–06 (2019–present)
- Thelma Drake, former VA–02 (2005–2009)

State legislators

- Luther Cifers, SD–10 (2025–present)
- Mark Obenshain, SD–02 (2004–present)
- Bryce Reeves, SD–28 (2012–present)

=== Fundraising ===
Campaign finance reports as of June 30, 2026
| Candidate | Raised | Spent | Cash on hand |
|---|---|---|---|
| Kim Farington (R) | $148,369 | $132,209 | $16,159 |
| Bert Mizusawa (R) | $376,213 | $323,248 | $52,964 |
| Bryce Reeves (R) | $106,324 | $106,324 | $0 |
| David Williams (R) | $97,044 | $89,856 | $7,187 |
Source: Federal Election Commission

=== Polling ===
| Poll source | Date(s) administered | Sample size (Note: Key: A – all adults RV – registered voters LV – likely voters V – unclear) | Margin of error | Kim Farington | Bert Mizusawa | David Williams | Other | Undecided |
|---|---|---|---|---|---|---|---|---|
| The Public Sentiment Institute | June 12–16, 2026 | 326 (LV) | – | 23% | 16% | 15% | 1% (Note: "Would not vote" with 1%) | 45% |
| The Public Sentiment Institute | June 12–16, 2026 | 326 (RV) | – | 22% | 16% | 16% | 2% (Note: "Would not vote" with 2%) | 45% |
| The Public Sentiment Institute/ Virginia Project (R) | May 1–5, 2026 | 382 (LV) | – | 22% | 24% | 10% | 4% (Note: "Would not vote" with 4%) | 40% |
| The Public Sentiment Institute/ Virginia Project (R) | May 1–5, 2026 | 396 (RV) | – | 20% | 21% | 11% | 6% (Note: "Would not vote" with 6%) | 42% |

=== Debates and forums ===
2026 Virginia Senate Republican Debate
| No. | Date | Host | Moderator | Link | Republican | Republican | Republican |
| Key: P Participant A Absent N Not invited I Invited W Withdrawn | | | | | | | |
| Key: P Participant A Absent N Not invited I Invited W Withdrawn | | | | | Farington | Mizusawa | Williams |
|---|---|---|---|---|---|---|---|
| 1 | June 26, 2026 | Family Foundation of Virginia | Chris Saxman | Facebook | P | P | P |

=== Results ===
Results by county and independent city: Mizusawa: 30–40%; 40–50%; 50–60%; 60–70%; Williams: 40–50%

Republican primary results
| Party | Candidate | Votes | % |
|---|---|---|---|
| Republican | Bert Mizusawa | 124,271 | 51.5 |
| Republican | David Williams | 69,725 | 28.9 |
| Republican | Kim Farington | 47,357 | 19.6 |
| Total votes | | 241,353 | 100.0 |

== Independents ==
=== Candidates ===
==== Withdrawn ====
- Mark Moran, former investment banker and reality TV star (previously ran as a Democrat) (running for Fairfax County Commonwealth's Attorney)

== General election ==
=== Campaign ===
Two proposed debates were canceled, with the Warner campaign's noncommittal stance cited as the reason for both cancellations. On September 8, AARP announced that "The People's Debate," scheduled for October 7 in Richmond, had been canceled. A week later, on September 15, the League of Women Voters also announced the cancellation of its proposed debate planned for the first week of October.

=== Predictions ===
| Source | Ranking | As of |
|---|---|---|
| The Cook Political Report | Solid D | November 2, 2026 |
| Decision Desk HQ | Safe D | November 3, 2026 |
| The Economist (Note: The Economist's prediction model uses unconventional terminology. For the purpose of equivalency, their "Very Likely" ratings are formatted as a "Likely" rating while "Likely" ratings are formatted as a "Lean" rating.) | Safe D | November 3, 2026 |
| FiftyPlusOne | Safe D | November 3, 2026 |
| Fox News | Solid D | November 1, 2026 |
| Inside Elections | Solid D | October 29, 2026 |
| MS NOW | Safe D | October 29, 2026 |
| NBC News | Solid D | November 3, 2026 |
| RealClearPolitics | Solid D | November 2, 2026 |
| Sabato's Crystal Ball | Safe D | November 2, 2026 |
| Silver Bulletin | Solid D | November 3, 2026 |
| Split Ticket | Safe D | November 2, 2026 |

=== Fundraising ===
Campaign finance reports as of October 14, 2026
| Candidate | Raised | Spent | Cash on hand |
|---|---|---|---|
| Mark Warner (D) | $27,493,348 | $21,664,081 | $6,217,677 |
| Bert Mizusawa (R) | $1,141,130 | $987,432 | $154,034 |
Source: Federal Election Commission

=== Post-primary endorsements ===
Mark Warner (D)

U.S. representatives

- Barbara Comstock, former VA-10 (2015–2019) (Republican)
- Denver Riggleman, former VA-05 (2019–2021) (Independent; elected as a Republican)

State legislators

- Tommy Norment, former Virginia Senate Republican caucus leader (2012–2024) from SD-03 (1992–2024) (Republican)
- John Watkins, former SD-10 (1998–2016) (Republican)

Local officials

- Ken Stolle, former sheriff of Virginia Beach (2010–2024) (Republican)

Labor unions

- National Education Association
- United Mine Workers of America COMPAC

Organizations

- Humane World Action Fund

=== Polling ===
| Poll source | Date(s) administered | Sample size | Margin of error | Mark Warner (D) | Bert Mizusawa (R) | Other | Undecided |
|---|---|---|---|---|---|---|---|
| | August 4, 2026 | Primary elections | | | | | |
| The Public Sentiment Institute | June 12–16, 2026 | 996 (LV) | ± 3.7% | 51% | 33% | 3% (Note: "Mark Moran (I)" with 3%) | 14% |
| The Public Sentiment Institute/ Virginia Project (R) | May 1–5, 2026 | 1,047 (LV) | ± 3.7% | 55% | 29% | 3% (Note: "Mark Moran (I)" with 3%) | 14% |

Hypothetical polling

Mark Warner vs. Kim Farington

| Poll source | Date(s) administered | Sample size | Margin of error | Mark Warner (D) | Kim Farington (R) | Mark Moran (I) | Undecided |
|---|---|---|---|---|---|---|---|
| | June 17, 2026 | Moran withdraws from the race | | | | | |
| The Public Sentiment Institute | June 12–16, 2026 | 996 (LV) | ± 3.7% | 51% | 33% | 3% | 13% |
| The Public Sentiment Institute/ Virginia Project (R) | May 1–5, 2026 | 1,047 (LV) | ± 3.7% | 54% | 29% | 2% | 14% |

Mark Warner vs. David Williams

| Poll source | Date(s) administered | Sample size | Margin of error | Mark Warner (D) | David Williams (R) | Mark Moran (I) | Undecided |
|---|---|---|---|---|---|---|---|
| | June 17, 2026 | Moran withdraws from the race | | | | | |
| The Public Sentiment Institute | June 12–16, 2026 | 996 (LV) | ± 3.7% | 51% | 33% | 3% | 13% |
| The Public Sentiment Institute/ Virginia Project (R) | May 1–5, 2026 | 1,047 (LV) | ± 3.7% | 54% | 29% | 3% | 14% |

Mark Warner vs. Glenn Youngkin

| Poll source | Date(s) administered | Sample size | Margin of error | Mark Warner (D) | Glenn Youngkin (R) | Undecided |
|---|---|---|---|---|---|---|
| Virginia Commonwealth University | December 18, 2024 – January 15, 2025 | 806 (A) | ± 4.7% | 45% | 38% | 17% |

=== Results ===
2026 United States Senate election in Virginia
| Party | Candidate | Votes | % | ±% |
|---|---|---|---|---|
| Democratic | Mark Warner (incumbent) | 2,251,628 | 61.60 | +5.61 |
| Republican | Bert Mizusawa | 1,393,710 | 38.13 | –5.78 |
| Write-in | | 9,800 | 0.27 | +0.17 |
| Total votes | | 3,655,138 | 100.00 | N/A |
| Democratic hold | | | | |

==== By county and independent city ====
| Locality | Mark Warner Democratic | | Bert Mizusawa Republican | | Write-in Various | | Margin | | Total votes cast |
| Locality | # | % | # | % | # | % | # | % | Total votes cast |
|---|---|---|---|---|---|---|---|---|---|
| Accomack | 7,029 | 49.65% | 7,114 | 50.25% | 14 | 0.10% | −85 | −0.60% | 14,157 |
| Albemarle | 43,830 | 72.94% | 16,093 | 26.78% | 164 | 0.27% | 27,737 | 46.16% | 60,087 |
| Alexandria | 58,194 | 84.86% | 10,065 | 14.68% | 318 | 0.46% | 48,129 | 70.18% | 68,577 |
| Alleghany | 2,110 | 35.96% | 3,751 | 63.92% | 7 | 0.12% | −1,641 | −27.97% | 5,868 |
| Amelia | 2,076 | 32.25% | 4,351 | 67.58% | 11 | 0.17% | −3,286 | −35.34% | 6,438 |
| Amherst | 5,391 | 38.40% | 8,609 | 61.33% | 38 | 0.27% | −3,218 | −22.92% | 14,038 |
| Appomattox | 2,264 | 28.80% | 5,580 | 70.97% | 18 | 0.23% | −3,316 | −42.18% | 7,862 |
| Arlington | 91,327 | 84.85% | 15,942 | 14.81% | 360 | 0.33% | 75,385 | 70.04% | 107,629 |
| Augusta | 11,254 | 32.40% | 23,409 | 67.40% | 69 | 0.20% | −12,155 | −35.00% | 34,732 |
| Bath | 579 | 30.72% | 1,304 | 69.18% | 2 | 0.11% | −725 | −38.46% | 1,885 |
| Bedford | 11,903 | 29.33% | 28,596 | 70.45% | 90 | 0.22% | −16,693 | −41.13% | 40,589 |
| Bland | 619 | 24.85% | 1,866 | 74.91% | 6 | 0.24% | −1,247 | −50.06% | 2,491 |
| Botetourt | 5,880 | 33.80% | 11,479 | 65.99% | 37 | 0.21% | −5,599 | −32.19% | 17,396 |
| Bristol | 2,125 | 42.31% | 2,885 | 57.45% | 12 | 0.24% | −760 | −15.13% | 5,022 |
| Brunswick | 3,579 | 59.52% | 2,430 | 40.41% | 4 | 0.07% | 1,149 | 19.11% | 6,013 |
| Buchanan | 1,515 | 27.76% | 3,930 | 72.02% | 12 | 0.22% | −2,415 | −44.26% | 5,457 |
| Buckingham | 2,878 | 45.79% | 3,403 | 54.14% | 4 | 0.06% | −525 | −8.35% | 6,285 |
| Buena Vista | 768 | 39.16% | 1,190 | 60.68% | 3 | 0.15% | −422 | −21.52% | 1,961 |
| Campbell | 7,581 | 30.89% | 16,865 | 68.72% | 94 | 0.38% | −9,284 | −37.83% | 24,540 |
| Caroline | 7,496 | 54.52% | 6,223 | 45.26% | 31 | 0.23% | 1,273 | 9.26% | 13,750 |
| Carroll | 2,993 | 25.48% | 8,735 | 74.37% | 18 | 0.15% | −5,742 | −48.88% | 11,746 |
| Charles City | 2,057 | 60.55% | 1,334 | 39.27% | 6 | 0.18% | 723 | 21.28% | 3,397 |
| Charlotte | 1,809 | 37.46% | 3,006 | 62.25% | 14 | 0.29% | −1,197 | −24.79% | 4,829 |
| Charlottesville | 19,292 | 89.42% | 2,201 | 10.20% | 81 | 0.38% | 17,091 | 79.22% | 21,574 |
| Chesapeake | 61,298 | 59.56% | 41,415 | 40.24% | 201 | 0.20% | 19,883 | 19.32% | 102,914 |
| Chesterfield | 111,680 | 62.70% | 66,032 | 37.07% | 393 | 0.22% | 45,648 | 25.63% | 178,105 |
| Clarke | 3,776 | 48.14% | 4,055 | 51.70% | 13 | 0.17% | −279 | −3.56% | 7,844 |
| Colonial Heights | 2,799 | 42.91% | 3,712 | 56.91% | 12 | 0.18% | −913 | −14.00% | 6,523 |
| Covington | 793 | 45.50% | 948 | 54.39% | 2 | 0.11% | −155 | −8.89% | 1,743 |
| Craig | 586 | 25.06% | 1,744 | 74.59% | 8 | 0.34% | −1,158 | −49.53% | 2,338 |
| Culpeper | 10,324 | 45.76% | 12,183 | 54.00% | 53 | 0.23% | −1,859 | −8.24% | 22,560 |
| Cumberland | 1,992 | 44.80% | 2,437 | 54.81% | 17 | 0.38% | −445 | −10.01% | 4,446 |
| Danville | 9,745 | 68.46% | 4,469 | 31.40% | 20 | 0.14% | 5,276 | 37.07% | 14,234 |
| Dickenson | 1,712 | 34.27% | 3,271 | 65.47% | 13 | 0.26% | −1,559 | −31.20% | 4,996 |
| Dinwiddie | 5,309 | 46.18% | 6,161 | 53.59% | 27 | 0.23% | −852 | −7.41% | 11,497 |
| Emporia | 1,251 | 70.68% | 518 | 29.27% | 1 | 0.06% | 733 | 41.41% | 1,770 |
| Essex | 2,585 | 51.81% | 2,397 | 48.05% | 7 | 0.14% | 188 | 3.77% | 4,989 |
| Fairfax City | 8,540 | 75.13% | 2,800 | 24.63% | 27 | 0.24% | 5,740 | 50.50% | 11,367 |
| Fairfax County | 370,693 | 76.12% | 114,347 | 23.48% | 1,976 | 0.41% | 256,346 | 52.64% | 487,016 |
| Falls Church | 6,952 | 84.83% | 1,222 | 14.91% | 21 | 0.26% | 5,730 | 69.92% | 8,195 |
| Fauquier | 16,144 | 45.76% | 19,051 | 53.99% | 88 | 0.25% | −2,907 | −8.24% | 35,283 |
| Floyd | 3,007 | 39.81% | 4,530 | 59.97% | 17 | 0.23% | −1,523 | −20.16% | 7,554 |
| Fluvanna | 7,618 | 54.66% | 6,277 | 45.04% | 42 | 0.30% | 1,341 | 9.62% | 13,937 |
| Franklin City | 2,315 | 68.49% | 1,057 | 31.27% | 8 | 0.24% | 1,258 | 37.22% | 3,380 |
| Franklin County | 7,959 | 33.34% | 15,856 | 66.42% | 59 | 0.25% | −7,897 | −33.08% | 23,874 |
| Frederick | 18,612 | 45.55% | 22,162 | 54.24% | 85 | 0.21% | −3,550 | −8.69% | 40,859 |
| Fredericksburg | 8,179 | 74.39% | 2,777 | 25.26% | 39 | 0.35% | 5,402 | 49.13% | 10,995 |
| Galax | 734 | 37.93% | 1,198 | 61.91% | 3 | 0.16% | −464 | −23.98% | 1,935 |
| Giles | 2,169 | 32.68% | 4,454 | 67.11% | 14 | 0.21% | −2,285 | −34.43% | 6,637 |
| Gloucester | 6,761 | 37.47% | 11,248 | 62.33% | 37 | 0.21% | −4,487 | −24.86% | 18,046 |
| Goochland | 8,239 | 46.63% | 9,391 | 53.15% | 38 | 0.22% | −1,152 | −6.52% | 17,668 |
| Grayson | 1,625 | 26.53% | 4,491 | 73.32% | 9 | 0.15% | −2,866 | −46.79% | 6,125 |
| Greene | 4,560 | 45.55% | 5,409 | 54.04% | 41 | 0.41% | −849 | −8.48% | 10,010 |
| Greensville | 2,004 | 60.29% | 1,318 | 39.65% | 2 | 0.06% | 686 | 20.64% | 3,324 |
| Halifax | 6,313 | 45.31% | 7,604 | 54.58% | 15 | 0.11% | −1,291 | −9.27% | 13,932 |
| Hampton | 39,369 | 77.80% | 11,153 | 22.04% | 79 | 0.16% | 28,216 | 55.76% | 50,601 |
| Hanover | 26,665 | 43.31% | 34,785 | 56.50% | 112 | 0.18% | −8,120 | −13.19% | 61,562 |
| Harrisonburg | 11,299 | 76.62% | 3,410 | 23.12% | 38 | 0.26% | 7,889 | 53.50% | 14,747 |
| Henrico | 112,370 | 72.20% | 42,908 | 27.57% | 359 | 0.23% | 69,462 | 44.63% | 155,637 |
| Henry | 7,569 | 41.40% | 10,687 | 58.45% | 27 | 0.15% | −3,118 | −17.05% | 18,283 |
| Highland | 419 | 34.89% | 779 | 64.86% | 3 | 0.25% | −360 | −29.98% | 1,201 |
| Hopewell | 4,489 | 66.97% | 2,199 | 32.81% | 15 | 0.22% | 2,290 | 34.16% | 6,703 |
| Isle of Wight | 9,762 | 46.81% | 11,047 | 52.97% | 47 | 0.23% | −1,285 | −6.16% | 20,856 |
| James City | 25,915 | 58.77% | 18,099 | 41.04% | 85 | 0.19% | 7,816 | 17.72% | 44,099 |
| King and Queen | 1,429 | 42.57% | 1,921 | 57.22% | 7 | 0.21% | −492 | −14.66% | 3,357 |
| King George | 5,419 | 45.37% | 6,493 | 54.37% | 31 | 0.26% | −1,074 | −8.99% | 11,943 |
| King William | 3,422 | 37.56% | 5,674 | 62.28% | 14 | 0.15% | −2,252 | −24.72% | 9,110 |
| Lancaster | 3,124 | 50.27% | 3,085 | 49.65% | 5 | 0.08% | 39 | 0.63% | 6,214 |
| Lee | 1,586 | 24.76% | 4,810 | 75.09% | 10 | 0.16% | −3,224 | −50.33% | 6,406 |
| Lexington | 1,598 | 71.43% | 636 | 28.43% | 3 | 0.13% | 962 | 43.00% | 2,237 |
| Loudoun | 127,841 | 68.94% | 56,969 | 30.72% | 632 | 0.34% | 70,872 | 38.22% | 185,442 |
| Louisa | 8,512 | 43.80% | 10,868 | 55.93% | 52 | 0.27% | −2,356 | −12.12% | 19,432 |
| Lunenburg | 2,050 | 44.50% | 2,547 | 55.29% | 10 | 0.22% | −497 | −10.79% | 4,607 |
| Lynchburg | 16,016 | 51.36% | 15,059 | 48.29% | 110 | 0.35% | 957 | 3.07% | 31,185 |
| Madison | 2,525 | 37.99% | 4,108 | 61.81% | 13 | 0.20% | −1,583 | −23.82% | 6,646 |
| Manassas | 9,208 | 70.67% | 3,786 | 29.06% | 36 | 0.28% | 5,422 | 41.61% | 13,030 |
| Manassas Park | 3,534 | 75.84% | 1,112 | 23.86% | 14 | 0.30% | 2,422 | 51.97% | 4,660 |
| Martinsville | 2,896 | 68.13% | 1,348 | 31.71% | 7 | 0.16% | 1,548 | 36.41% | 4,251 |
| Mathews | 1,730 | 36.22% | 3,041 | 63.66% | 6 | 0.13% | −1,311 | −27.44% | 4,777 |
| Mecklenburg | 5,696 | 44.64% | 7,055 | 55.29% | 9 | 0.07% | −1,359 | −10.65% | 12,760 |
| Middlesex | 2,520 | 42.67% | 3,376 | 57.16% | 10 | 0.17% | −856 | −14.49% | 5,906 |
| Montgomery | 24,201 | 62.53% | 14,403 | 37.22% | 96 | 0.25% | 9,798 | 25.32% | 38,700 |
| Nelson | 4,187 | 53.67% | 3,593 | 46.05% | 22 | 0.28% | 594 | 7.61% | 7,802 |
| New Kent | 5,737 | 40.54% | 8,387 | 59.26% | 28 | 0.20% | −2,650 | −18.73% | 14,152 |
| Newport News | 43,576 | 72.74% | 16,248 | 27.12% | 85 | 0.14% | 27,328 | 45.62% | 59,909 |
| Norfolk | 54,807 | 78.94% | 14,469 | 20.84% | 154 | 0.22% | 40,338 | 58.10% | 69,430 |
| Northampton | 3,572 | 59.41% | 2,424 | 40.32% | 16 | 0.27% | 1,148 | 19.10% | 6,012 |
| Northumberland | 3,114 | 44.77% | 3,826 | 55.01% | 15 | 0.22% | −712 | −10.24% | 6,955 |
| Norton | 434 | 40.79% | 626 | 58.83% | 4 | 0.38% | −192 | −18.05% | 1,064 |
| Nottoway | 2,348 | 44.82% | 2,876 | 54.90% | 15 | 0.29% | −528 | −10.08% | 5,239 |
| Orange | 8,065 | 45.83% | 9,477 | 53.86% | 54 | 0.31% | −1,412 | −8.02% | 17,596 |
| Page | 2,917 | 30.70% | 6,567 | 69.10% | 19 | 0.20% | −3,650 | −38.41% | 9,503 |
| Patrick | 1,832 | 26.31% | 5,123 | 73.56% | 9 | 0.13% | −3,291 | −47.26% | 6,964 |
| Petersburg | 9,394 | 91.37% | 871 | 8.47% | 16 | 0.16% | 8,523 | 82.90% | 10,281 |
| Pittsylvania | 9,134 | 34.66% | 17,175 | 65.17% | 45 | 0.17% | −8,041 | −30.51% | 26,354 |
| Poquoson | 2,160 | 33.71% | 4,229 | 66.01% | 18 | 0.28% | −2,069 | −32.29% | 6,407 |
| Portsmouth | 25,562 | 77.56% | 7,333 | 22.25% | 64 | 0.19% | 18,229 | 55.31% | 32,959 |
| Powhatan | 5,693 | 33.40% | 11,301 | 66.31% | 49 | 0.29% | −5,608 | −32.91% | 17,043 |
| Prince Edward | 4,445 | 56.24% | 3,426 | 43.35% | 32 | 0.40% | 1,019 | 12.89% | 7,903 |
| Prince George | 6,177 | 46.62% | 7,052 | 53.23% | 20 | 0.15% | −875 | −6.60% | 13,249 |
| Prince William | 133,162 | 71.53% | 52,475 | 28.19% | 519 | 0.28% | 80,687 | 43.34% | 186,156 |
| Pulaski | 4,794 | 36.99% | 8,131 | 62.74% | 34 | 0.26% | −3,337 | −25.75% | 12,959 |
| Radford | 3,214 | 61.99% | 1,959 | 37.78% | 12 | 0.23% | 1,255 | 24.20% | 5,185 |
| Rappahannock | 1,969 | 47.88% | 2,117 | 51.48% | 26 | 0.63% | −148 | −3.60% | 4,112 |
| Richmond City | 85,579 | 88.67% | 10,588 | 10.97% | 349 | 0.36% | 74,991 | 77.70% | 96,516 |
| Richmond County | 1,401 | 42.36% | 1,901 | 57.48% | 5 | 0.15% | −500 | −15.12% | 3,307 |
| Roanoke City | 23,462 | 71.30% | 9,350 | 28.41% | 96 | 0.29% | 14,112 | 42.88% | 32,908 |
| Roanoke County | 21,027 | 47.30% | 23,333 | 52.49% | 95 | 0.21% | −2,306 | −5.19% | 44,455 |
| Rockbridge | 4,009 | 39.16% | 6,211 | 60.67% | 17 | 0.17% | −2,202 | −21.51% | 10,237 |
| Rockingham | 13,870 | 36.77% | 23,764 | 63.00% | 88 | 0.23% | −9,894 | −26.23% | 37,722 |
| Russell | 2,525 | 27.86% | 6,518 | 71.92% | 20 | 0.22% | −3,993 | −44.06% | 9,063 |
| Salem | 4,838 | 48.78% | 5,061 | 51.03% | 19 | 0.19% | −223 | −2.25% | 9,918 |
| Scott | 1,809 | 24.22% | 5,639 | 75.50% | 21 | 0.28% | −3,830 | −51.28% | 7,469 |
| Shenandoah | 6,776 | 36.34% | 11,827 | 63.44% | 41 | 0.22% | −5,051 | −27.09% | 18,644 |
| Smyth | 3,052 | 30.01% | 7,087 | 69.68% | 32 | 0.31% | −4,035 | −39.67% | 10,171 |
| Southampton | 3,325 | 43.25% | 4,351 | 56.60% | 11 | 0.14% | −1,026 | −13.35% | 7,687 |
| Spotsylvania | 35,194 | 55.81% | 27,694 | 43.92% | 169 | 0.27% | 7,500 | 11.89% | 63,057 |
| Stafford | 41,039 | 60.38% | 26,758 | 39.37% | 175 | 0.26% | 14,281 | 21.01% | 67,972 |
| Staunton | 7,398 | 65.46% | 3,878 | 34.32% | 25 | 0.22% | 3,520 | 31.15% | 11,301 |
| Suffolk | 30,277 | 65.59% | 15,792 | 34.21% | 91 | 0.20% | 14,485 | 31.38% | 46,160 |
| Surry | 1,977 | 55.32% | 1,591 | 44.52% | 6 | 0.17% | 386 | 10.80% | 3,574 |
| Sussex | 2,171 | 56.98% | 1,634 | 42.89% | 5 | 0.13% | 537 | 14.09% | 3,810 |
| Tazewell | 3,185 | 24.18% | 9,960 | 75.61% | 28 | 0.21% | −6,775 | −51.43% | 13,173 |
| Virginia Beach | 111,162 | 59.22% | 76,216 | 40.60% | 338 | 0.18% | 34,946 | 18.62% | 187,716 |
| Warren | 6,514 | 38.61% | 10,277 | 60.92% | 80 | 0.47% | −3,763 | −22.30% | 16,871 |
| Washington | 7,065 | 33.53% | 13,933 | 66.12% | 73 | 0.35% | −6,868 | −32.59% | 21,071 |
| Waynesboro | 5,153 | 56.42% | 3,952 | 43.27% | 28 | 0.31% | 1,201 | 13.15% | 9,133 |
| Westmoreland | 4,374 | 49.62% | 4,421 | 50.15% | 20 | 0.23% | −47 | −0.53% | 8,815 |
| Williamsburg | 5,815 | 78.05% | 1,613 | 21.65% | 22 | 0.30% | 4,202 | 56.40% | 7,450 |
| Winchester | 6,205 | 65.52% | 3,245 | 34.27% | 20 | 0.21% | 2,960 | 31.26% | 9,470 |
| Wise | 3,186 | 29.06% | 7,736 | 70.56% | 42 | 0.38% | −4,550 | −41.50% | 10,964 |
| Wythe | 3,244 | 29.25% | 7,815 | 70.47% | 31 | 0.28% | −4,571 | −41.22% | 11,090 |
| York | 17,716 | 53.03% | 15,627 | 46.77% | 66 | 0.20% | 2,089 | 6.25% | 33,409 |
| Totals | 2,251,628 | 61.60% | 1,393,710 | 38.13% | 9,800 | 0.27% | 857,918 | 23.47% | 3,655,138 |

==== Counties and independent cities that flipped from Republican to Democratic ====
- Fluvanna (largest municipality: Lake Monticello)
- Lancaster (largest municipality: Kilmarnock)
- Spotsylvania (largest municipality: Spotsylvania Courthouse)
- Waynesboro (independent city)
- York (largest municipality: Grafton)

==== By congressional district ====
Warner won nine congressional districts, including one that elected a Republican, while Mizusawa won two.

| District | Warner | Mizusawa | Elected Representative |
|---|---|---|---|
| 1st | 54.71% | 45.08% | Shannon Taylor |
| 2nd | 57.49% | 42.33% | Elaine Luria |
| 3rd | 75.56% | 24.25% | Bobby Scott |
| 4th | 74.35% | 25.40% | Jennifer McClellan |
| 5th | 50.43% | 49.31% | John McGuire |
| 6th | 46.47% | 53.29% | Ben Cline |
| 7th | 62.17% | 37.55% | Eugene Vindman |
| 8th | 81.72% | 17.88% | Don Beyer |
| 9th | 37.68% | 62.08% | Morgan Griffith |
| 10th | 64.69% | 35.00% | Suhas Subramanyam |
| 11th | 75.88% | 23.72% | James Walkinshaw |

== See also ==
- 2026 United States elections
- 2026 Virginia elections
- 2026 United States House of Representatives elections in Virginia
