= Amy Laufer =

American politician

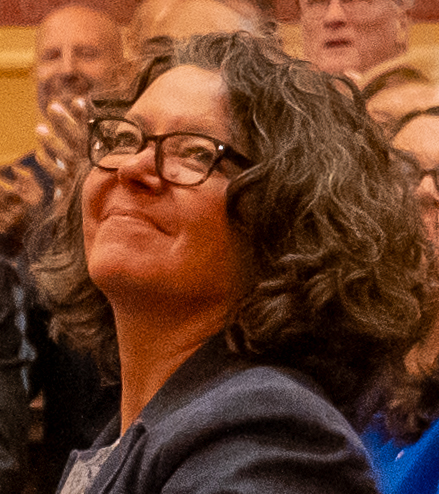

Member of the Virginia House of Delegates from the 55th district
- Incumbent
- Assumed office January 10, 2024

Charlottesville City School Board
- In office 2012–2019

Personal details
- Born: May 13, 1972 (age 54) Wisconsin
- Party: Democratic
- Spouse: Aaron Laufer
- Children: 3
- Education: University of Wisconsin-Milwaukee (BS); Columbia University Teachers College (MA)

Amy Josephine Laufer (born May 13, 1972) is an American Democratic politician from the Commonwealth of Virginia. She was elected to the Virginia House of Delegates in the 2023 Virginia House of Delegates election from the Virginia's 55th House District.

== Early life ==
Laufer, one of eight children, grew up on a dairy farm in rural Wisconsin. She became the first in her family to attend college, and she graduated from the University of Wisconsin–Milwaukee, earning a bachelor's degree in geology. She then joined the Peace Corps, teaching elementary school in a rural town in Jamaica. Following the Peace Corps, she attended Teachers College at Columbia University in New York City, graduating with a master's degree in secondary science education.

== Career ==
Laufer is a former school teacher, having taught at Louisa County Middle School and Tandem Friends School in Charlottesville. In 2011, she was elected to the Charlottesville School Board, and was re-elected in 2015. Laufer served as board chair from 2015 until 2016. In January 2019, Laufer resigned from the school board due to purchasing a home outside of Charlottesville City. Laufer ran for the Charlottesville City Council in 2017, but was defeated in the general election. During 2022, Laufer briefly served as the chair of the Albemarle County Democrats until June.

In 2014, she founded Virginia's List, a political group supporting Democratic women running for office.

Laufer has been praised as an active and vocal member of the Virginia Legislature. Laufer introduced HB1277 on her first day in office, aimed at facilitating a safe and efficient hiring process for early education and childcare workers; the bill was signed into law in March 2024. In April 2024, her proposal to remove personal property tax on indoor agricultural equipment (HB1429) was also signed into law. On social issues, Laufer has remained a vocal advocate of women's reproductive rights, calling on Governor Glenn Youngkin to enshrine protections for contraception into Virginia law.

In February 2025, the House of Delegates passed HB2002, a bill proposed by Laufer, that prevents state officials from removing active-duty military from voter rolls while overseas. As of June 2025, Laufer serves on the Finance, Education, and Agriculture Chesapeake and Natural Resources Committees in the Virginia General Assembly. Laufer is also a part of the House Select Committees on Advancing Rural and Small Town Health Care, on Block Grants, and on Maintaining Campus Safety and First Amendment Expression, as well as the Joint Committee on Administrative Rules.

As of June 2025, Laufer is a member of the Appalachian Region Interstate Compact Commission, the Virginia Women’s Monument Commission, the State Water Commission, and is the current Chair of the Disability Commission. She is a trustee of the Center for Rural Virginia and the Frontier Culture Museum of Virginia.

== Campaign for Virginia State Senate ==
Laufer ran in Virginia's 17th Senate district, which stretched from Fredericksburg to the suburbs of Charlottesville in Albemarle County, and included all of Orange County and portions of Culpepper, Louisa and Spotsylvania counties. Laufer's primary opponent was Ben Hixon, former chairman of the Democratic Party of Culpeper, whom she defeated handily. She narrowly lost the general election to Republican incumbent Bryce Reeves, by three percentage points.

County and independent city results Reeves: 50–60%; 60–70%; Laufer: 60–70%

2019 Virginia Senate election, District 17
Primary election
| Party | Candidate | Votes | % |
|---|---|---|---|
| Republican | Bryce Reeves (incumbent) | 6,325 | 82.3 |
| Republican | Rich Breeden | 1,359 | 17.7 |
| Total votes | | 7,685 | 100 |
| Democratic | Amy Laufer | 6,042 | 78.2 |
| Democratic | Ben Hixon | 1,679 | 21.7 |
| Total votes | | 7,722 | 100 |
General election
| Republican | Bryce Reeves (incumbent) | 34,494 | 51.6 |
| Democratic | Amy Laufer | 32,176 | 48.1 |
| Total votes | | 66,878 | 100 |
| Republican hold | | | |

== Campaign for Virginia House of Delegates ==
In July 2022, Laufer announced her candidacy for a seat in the Virginia House of Delegates in the newly formed 55th District. The 55th was created in the 2021 redistricting process and has no previous incumbent. Her opponent in the Democratic race was Kellen Squire, an ER nurse at the University of Virginia Hospital. On June 21, Laufer won her primary against Squire by a nearly 70-30% margin. In the November 2023 General Election, she defeated Republican Steve Harvey with 61.4% of the vote. Laufer assumed office on January 10, 2024.

In January 2025, Laufer announced her re-election bid for Virginia's 55th District.

== Personal and family ==
Laufer lives in Albemarle County with her husband Aaron and their three children.
