= 2020 United States Senate election in Virginia =

- November 3, 2020
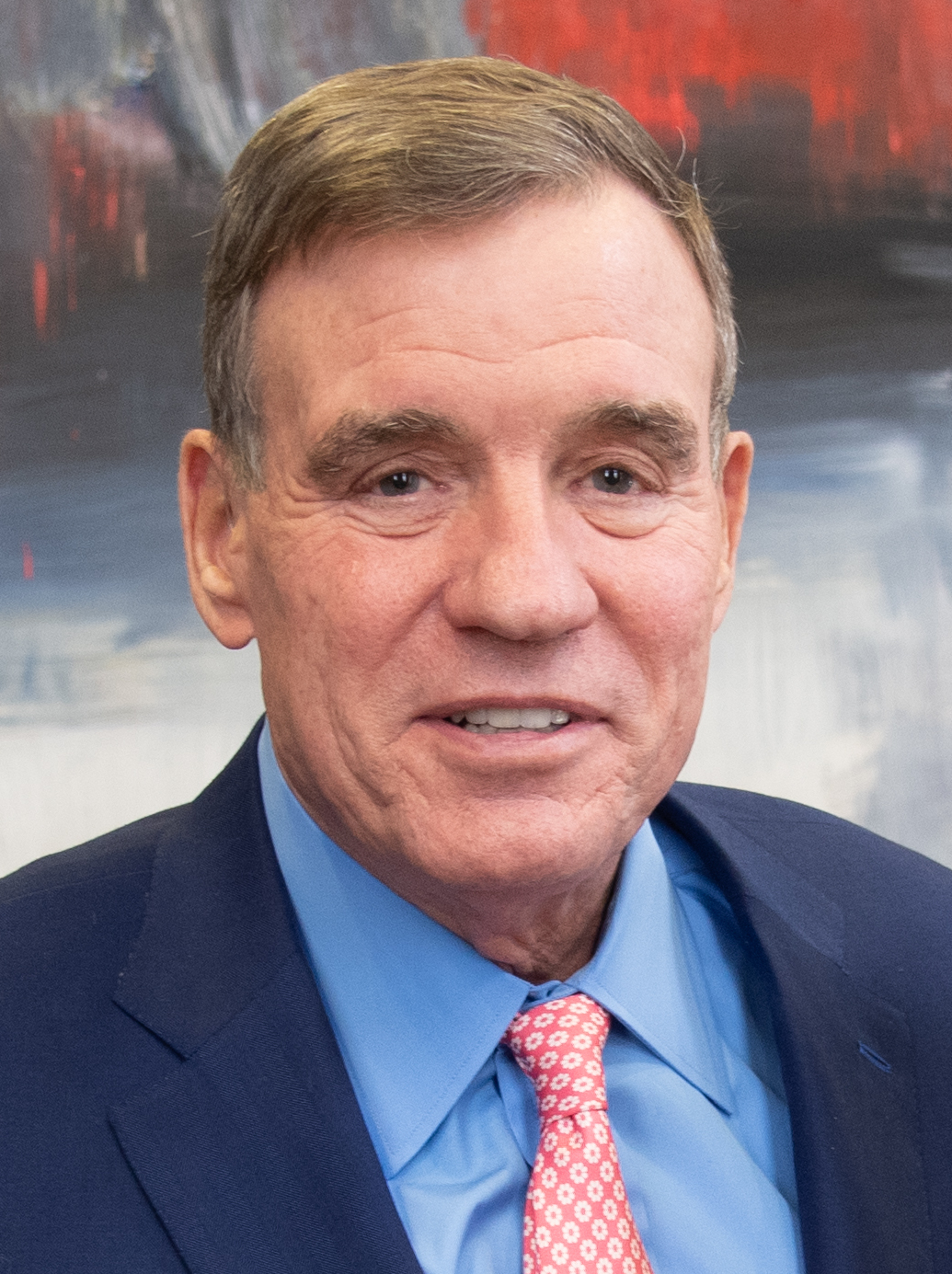

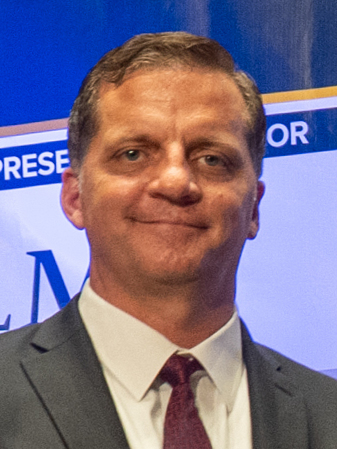
Nominee	Mark Warner	Daniel Gade
Party	Democratic	Republican
Popular vote	2,466,500	1,934,199
Percentage	55.99%	43.91%
- Warner: 40–50% 50–60% 60–70% 70–80% 80–90% >90% Gade: 40–50% 50–60% 60–70% 70–80% 80–90% >90% Tie: 50% No data
U.S. senator before election
Mark Warner
Democratic
Elected U.S. Senator
Mark Warner
Democratic

The 2020 United States Senate election in Virginia was held on November 3, 2020, to elect a member of the United States Senate to represent the Commonwealth of Virginia, concurrently with the 2020 U.S. presidential election, as well as other elections to the United States Senate in other states and elections to the United States House of Representatives, and various state and local elections. Incumbent Democratic senator Mark Warner won reelection to a third term against Republican nominee Daniel Gade.

Of Virginia's 20 most populous counties and independent cities, Warner won 18, losing only Hanover and Spotsylvania.

== Background ==
Incumbent Senator Mark Warner first won election in 2008 getting 65% of the vote over former Governor Jim Gilmore. In 2014, during the Tea Party movement, and declining voter turnout, Senator Warner won re-election by a margin of 0.8% against former chair of the Republican National Committee Ed Gillespie.

== Democratic primary ==
=== Candidates ===
==== Nominee ====
- Mark Warner, incumbent U.S. senator

== Republican primary ==
Seven Republicans declared that they would compete in the race, but only three made the threshold of 3,500 signatures. The original signature threshold was 10,000 signatures, but was lowered to 3,500 following a suit by Omari Faulkner. The primary was on June 23.

=== Candidates ===
==== Nominee ====
- Daniel Gade, college professor and U.S. Army veteran

==== Eliminated in primary ====
- Alissa Baldwin, teacher
- Thomas Speciale, U.S. Army veteran and intelligence officer

==== Failed to qualify ====
- Blaine Dunn, Frederick County supervisor
- Omari Faulkner, Navy reservist and former Georgetown University basketball player
- Roger Franklin
- Victor Williams, attorney and activist

==== Withdrawn ====
- Gary Adkins, financial executive
- John Easley, Republican candidate for Virginia's 1st congressional district in 2020
- Scott Taylor, former U.S. representative for Virginia's 2nd congressional district (ran for his former House seat)

==== Declined ====
- Nick Freitas, state delegate and candidate for U.S. Senate in 2018 (ran for U.S. House)
- Corey Stewart, nominee for U.S. Senate in 2018 and former chairman of the Prince William Board of County Supervisors

=== Endorsements ===
Daniel Gade

National party officials

- Morton Blackwell, Virginia representative to the Republican National Committee

U.S. representatives

- Randy Forbes, former (VA-04)
- Elise Stefanik (NY-21)
- Scott Rigell, former (VA-02)

State senators

- Bill Carrico, former (40)
- Richard Stuart (28)
- Jill Vogel (27)

State delegates

- Terry Kilgore (1)
- Wendell Walker (23)

Individuals

- Don Bolduc, brigadier general and 2020 candidate for U.S. Senate in New Hampshire
- E. W. Jackson, pastor and conservative activist

=== Results ===
Results by county and independent city: Gade: 40–50%; 50–60%; 60–70%; 70–80%; 80–90%; 90–100%

Republican primary results
Party	Candidate	Votes	%
Republican	Daniel Gade	208,754	67.40%
Republican	Alissa Baldwin	56,165	18.13%
Republican	Thomas Speciale	44,795	14.46%
Total votes		309,714	100.0%

== Independents ==
=== Withdrawn ===
- Mary Knapp
- Aldous Mina, Peace Corps veteran

== General election ==
Virginia's 2020 Senate election was widely considered to be a safe hold for Mark Warner, as pre-election polling showed a massive lead for Warner. Warner's razor-thin victory over Ed Gillespie six years earlier was considered to be a fluke owing to lowered turnout and complacency. On election day, Warner was declared the winner as soon as polls closed based on exit polling alone. The higher turnout is attributable to this election being held concurrently with the presidential election. Warner also notably outperformed Biden in the state, although narrowly.

Warner's victory was largely drawn from the DC Metropolitan area in Northern Virginia. This is the area that has shifted Virginia from a Republican stronghold in the early 2000s to a Democratic stronghold.

- Complete video of debate, September 23, 2020

=== Predictions ===
Source	Ranking	As of
The Cook Political Report	Safe D	October 29, 2020
Inside Elections	Safe D	October 28, 2020
Sabato's Crystal Ball	Safe D	November 2, 2020
Daily Kos	Safe D	October 30, 2020
Politico	Safe D	November 2, 2020
RCP	Likely D	October 23, 2020
DDHQ	Safe D	November 3, 2020
538	Safe D	November 2, 2020
Economist	Safe D	November 2, 2020

=== Post-primary endorsements ===
Mark Warner (D)

Labor unions

- International Federation of Professional and Technical Engineers

Organizations

- Black Economic Alliance
- Coalition to Stop Gun Violence
- End Citizens United
- Human Rights Campaign
- Humane Society of the United States Legislative Fund
- Joint Action Committee for Political Affairs
- League of Conservation Voters
- National Education Association
- National Organization for Women
- Planned Parenthood
- Population Connection
- Sierra Club
Daniel Gade (R)

U.S. representatives

- Dan Crenshaw, TX-02 (2019–present)

=== Polling ===
View source data.

Poll source	Date(s) administered	Sample size (Note: Key: A – all adults RV – registered voters LV – likely voters V – unclear)	Margin of error	Mark Warner (D)	Daniel Gade (R)	Other/ Undecided
Swayable (Note: Archived November 13, 2020, at the Wayback Machine)	October 27 – November 1, 2020	283 (LV)	± 8.3%	61%	39%	–
Data for Progress	October 27 – November 1, 2020	690 (LV)	± 3.7%	57%	42%	1% (Note: "Other candidate or write-in" with 1%)
Roanoke College	October 23–29, 2020	802 (LV)	± 3.4%	55%	39%	6% (Note: "Refused/would not vote" with 2%; Undecided with 4%)
Christopher Newport University	October 15–27, 2020	908 (LV)	± 3.4%	57%	37%	6% (Note: "Someone else" with 0%; Undecided with 6%)
Swayable	October 23–26, 2020	332 (LV)	± 7.3%	60%	40%	–
Virginia Commonwealth University	October 13–22, 2020	709 (LV)	± 4.93%	55%	38%	8% (Note: "Undecided/Refused" with 8%)
Schar School/Washington Post	October 13–19, 2020	908 (LV)	± 4%	57%	39%	4% (Note: "Other" and "Neither" with 0%; would not vote with no voters; Undecided with 4%)
Civiqs/Daily Kos	October 11–14, 2020	1,231 (LV)	± 3.1%	54%	43%	2% (Note: "Someone else" with 0%; Undecided with 2%)
Reconnect Research/Roanoke College	September 30 – October 12, 2020	602 (LV)	–	55%	38%	7% (Note: Undecided with 7%)
Roanoke College/Reconnect Research	September 30 – October 12, 2020	602 (LV)	± 5.4%	55%	38%	7%
Cygnal (R) (Note: Poll conducted by Daniel Gade's campaign)	October 9–11, 2020	607 (LV)	–	51%	44%	5% (Note: Undecided with 5%)
Cygnal (R) (Note: Archived October 4, 2020, at the Wayback Machine)	September 22–25, 2020	600 (LV)	–	51%	41%	–
Christopher Newport University	September 9–21, 2020	796 (LV)	± 3.9%	52%	39%	9% (Note: "Someone else" with 1%; Undecided with 8%)
Virginia Commonwealth University (Note: Archived September 15, 2020, at the Wayback Machine)	August 28 – September 7, 2020	692 (LV)	± 6.22%	55%	38%	6 (Note: "Don't know/refused" with 6%)
Roanoke College	August 9–22, 2020	566 (LV)	± 4.1%	55%	34%	10% (Note: "Refused" with 0%)

Hypothetical polling

with Mark Warner and Generic Republican

Poll source	Date(s) administered	Sample size	Margin of error	Mark Warner (D)	Generic Republican	Other	Undecided
Roanoke College	May 3–16, 2020	563 (LV)	± 4.1%	48%	31%	–	–

with Generic Democrat and Generic Republican

Poll source	Date(s) administered	Sample size	Margin of error	Generic Democrat	Generic Republican	Other	Undecided
Ipsos/University of Virginia	Feb 15–19, 2019	636 (A)	± 4.0%	43%	26%	2%	23%

=== Results ===
2020 United States Senate election in Virginia (Note: On January 11th, 2024, the Prince William County Office of Elections issued a notice that the election results in the county were improperly reported. The error caused Gade's countywide votes to be underreported by 107, and Warner's countywide votes to be underreported by 1,589. See https://www.princewilliamtimes.com/news/criminal-charges-against-former-prince-william-elections-chief-now-dropped-stemmed-from-vote-tabulation-errors/article_40a3eeca-b0e9-11ee-b49c-4f4ae054a6b0.html)
Party	Candidate	Votes	%	±%
Democratic	Mark Warner (incumbent)	2,466,500	55.99%	+6.84%
Republican	Daniel Gade	1,934,199	43.91%	−4.43%
Write-in		4,388	0.10%	+0.02%
Total votes		4,405,087	100.00%	N/A
Democratic hold				

==== By county and independent city ====
By county and independent city

Locality	Mark Warner Democratic		Daniel Gade Republican		Write-in Various		Margin		Total votes
Locality	#	%	#	%	#	%	#	%	Total votes
Accomack	7,939	47.23	8,863	52.72	9	0.05	-924	-5.50	16,811
Albemarle	42,730	67.31	20,700	32.61	55	0.09	22,030	34.70	63,485
Alexandria	65,071	79.37	16,802	20.50	107	0.13	48,269	58.88	81,980
Alleghany	2,822	35.30	5,159	64.53	14	0.18	-2,337	-29.23	7,995
Amelia	2,559	32.67	5,266	67.23	8	0.10	-2,707	-34.56	7,833
Amherst	6,273	37.11	10,624	62.85	6	0.04	-4,351	-25.74	16,903
Appomattox	2,741	30.26	6,306	69.63	10	0.11	-3,565	-39.36	9,057
Arlington	102,880	79.37	26,590	20.51	154	0.12	76,290	58.85	129,624
Augusta	12,224	29.07	29,794	70.86	26	0.06	-17,570	-41.79	42,044
Bath	744	30.57	1,688	69.35	2	0.08	-944	-38.78	2,434
Bedford	13,872	28.71	34,407	71.21	39	0.08	-20,535	-42.50	48,318
Bland	732	21.62	2,651	78.29	3	0.09	-1,919	-56.67	3,386
Botetourt	6,512	31.43	14,190	68.49	15	0.07	-7,678	-37.06	20,717
Bristol	2,787	36.25	4,892	63.63	9	0.12	-2,105	-27.38	7,688
Brunswick	4,727	59.68	3,192	40.30	2	0.03	1,535	19.38	7,921
Buchanan	2,522	25.90	7,202	73.97	12	0.12	-4,680	-48.07	9,736
Buckingham	3,656	45.40	4,392	54.55	4	0.05	-736	-9.14	8,052
Buena Vista	1,020	37.13	1,724	62.76	3	0.11	-704	-25.63	2,747
Campbell	9,278	31.29	20,337	68.60	32	0.11	-11,059	-37.30	29,647
Caroline	8,124	50.23	8,036	49.68	14	0.09	88	0.54	16,174
Carroll	3,591	23.60	11,610	76.31	14	0.09	-8,019	-52.70	15,215
Charles City	2,700	61.29	1,704	38.68	1	0.02	996	22.61	4,405
Charlotte	2,522	40.95	3,633	59.00	3	0.05	-1,111	-18.04	6,158
Charlottesville	20,672	85.76	3,409	14.14	24	0.10	17,263	71.62	24,105
Chesapeake	68,129	53.90	58,154	46.00	125	0.10	9,975	7.89	126,408
Chesterfield	107,568	53.67	92,658	46.23	195	0.10	14,910	7.44	200,421
Clarke	4,052	43.69	5,214	56.22	8	0.09	-1,162	-12.53	9,274
Colonial Heights	3,143	35.16	5,788	64.74	9	0.10	-2,645	-29.59	8,940
Covington	1,157	45.46	1,386	54.46	2	0.08	-229	-9.00	2,545
Craig	757	24.09	2,381	75.76	5	0.16	-1,624	-51.67	3,143
Culpeper	11,123	41.61	15,590	58.33	16	0.06	-4,467	-16.71	26,729
Cumberland	2,317	43.99	2,947	55.95	3	0.06	-630	-11.96	5,267
Danville	12,519	65.16	6,680	34.77	14	0.07	5,839	30.39	19,213
Dickenson	2,052	28.49	5,142	71.40	8	0.11	-3,090	-42.90	7,202
Dinwiddie	6,445	43.34	8,414	56.58	13	0.09	-1,969	-13.24	14,872
Emporia	1,618	69.38	712	30.53	2	0.09	906	38.85	2,332
Essex	3,194	52.25	2,917	47.72	2	0.03	277	4.53	6,113
Fairfax City	9,179	68.88	4,134	31.02	14	0.11	5,045	37.86	13,327
Fairfax County	415,791	69.89	178,395	29.99	736	0.12	237,396	39.90	594,922
Falls Church	7,016	79.95	1,750	19.94	10	0.11	5,266	60.00	8,776
Fauquier	17,468	41.15	24,937	58.75	41	0.10	-7,469	-17.60	42,446
Floyd	3,407	36.52	5,908	63.34	13	0.14	-2,501	-26.81	9,328
Fluvanna	7,830	49.81	7,880	50.13	9	0.06	-50	-0.32	15,719
Franklin City	2,549	64.35	1,410	35.60	2	0.05	1,139	28.76	3,961
Franklin County	9,907	33.65	19,505	66.26	27	0.09	-9,598	-32.60	29,439
Frederick	17,962	37.46	29,940	62.45	44	0.09	-11,978	-24.98	47,946
Fredericksburg	8,495	67.48	4,080	32.41	13	0.10	4,415	35.07	12,588
Galax	919	35.36	1,679	64.60	1	0.04	-760	-29.24	2,599
Giles	2,713	30.06	6,306	69.87	6	0.07	-3,593	-39.81	9,025
Gloucester	7,521	33.97	14,605	65.96	17	0.08	-7,084	-31.99	22,143
Goochland	6,730	40.26	9,972	59.65	15	0.09	-3,242	-19.39	16,717
Grayson	1,946	24.56	5,972	75.36	7	0.09	-4,026	-50.80	7,925
Greene	4,529	40.45	6,661	59.49	6	0.05	-2,132	-19.04	11,196
Greensville	2,716	59.80	1,822	40.11	4	0.09	894	19.68	4,542
Halifax	8,258	45.65	9,824	54.31	6	0.03	-1,566	-8.66	18,088
Hampton	46,627	72.30	17,777	27.57	86	0.13	28,850	44.74	64,490
Hanover	25,864	37.04	43,893	62.86	69	0.10	-18,029	-25.82	69,826
Harrisonburg	11,116	66.30	5,634	33.60	17	0.10	5,482	32.70	16,767
Henrico	117,199	65.09	62,686	34.81	177	0.10	54,513	30.27	180,062
Henry	10,616	41.32	15,051	58.58	27	0.11	-4,435	-17.26	25,694
Highland	504	33.05	1,020	66.89	1	0.07	-516	-33.84	1,525
Hopewell	5,695	59.64	3,847	40.29	7	0.07	1,848	19.35	9,549
Isle of Wight	9,821	41.99	13,546	57.91	23	0.10	-3,725	-15.93	23,390
James City	25,685	52.07	23,600	47.84	41	0.08	2,085	4.23	49,326
King and Queen	1,705	41.74	2,372	58.07	8	0.20	-667	-16.33	4,085
King George	5,758	40.67	8,384	59.22	15	0.11	-2,626	-18.55	14,157
King William	3,447	32.72	7,079	67.20	9	0.09	-3,632	-34.48	10,535
Lancaster	3,457	48.64	3,648	51.32	3	0.04	-191	-2.69	7,108
Lee	2,240	22.74	7,600	77.16	10	0.10	-5,360	-54.42	9,850
Lexington	1,853	67.36	895	32.53	3	0.11	958	34.82	2,751
Loudoun	137,814	61.80	84,991	38.12	178	0.08	52,823	23.69	222,983
Louisa	8,700	39.98	13,039	59.92	20	0.09	-4,339	-19.94	21,759
Lunenburg	2,531	42.92	3,362	57.01	4	0.07	-831	-14.09	5,897
Lynchburg	18,587	51.85	17,208	48.00	53	0.15	1,379	3.85	35,848
Madison	2,925	36.16	5,156	63.75	7	0.09	-2,231	-27.58	8,088
Manassas	10,547	62.82	6,227	37.09	14	0.08	4,320	25.73	16,788
Manassas Park	4,084	67.86	1,929	32.05	5	0.08	2,155	35.81	6,018
Martinsville	3,957	67.72	1,881	32.19	5	0.09	2,076	35.53	5,843
Mathews	1,943	33.48	3,856	66.44	5	0.09	-1,913	-32.96	5,804
Mecklenburg	7,004	44.08	8,871	55.83	13	0.08	-1,867	-11.75	15,888
Middlesex	2,658	39.44	4,080	60.53	2	0.03	-1,422	-21.10	6,740
Montgomery	24,589	55.09	19,992	44.79	52	0.12	4,597	10.30	44,633
Nelson	4,673	50.75	4,526	49.16	8	0.09	147	1.60	9,207
New Kent	4,764	33.50	9,449	66.44	9	0.06	-4,685	-32.94	14,222
Newport News	53,265	67.61	25,428	32.27	95	0.12	27,837	35.33	78,788
Norfolk	66,152	74.01	23,084	25.83	144	0.16	43,068	48.19	89,380
Northampton	3,889	58.16	2,795	41.80	3	0.04	1,094	16.36	6,687
Northumberland	3,386	44.00	4,306	55.95	4	0.05	-920	-11.95	7,696
Norton	591	37.33	988	62.41	4	0.25	-397	-25.08	1,583
Nottoway	3,136	44.72	3,869	55.17	8	0.11	-733	-10.45	7,013
Orange	8,392	40.78	12,170	59.14	17	0.08	-3,778	-18.36	20,579
Page	3,420	27.57	8,968	72.31	15	0.12	-5,548	-44.73	12,403
Patrick	2,310	25.11	6,875	74.74	13	0.14	-4,565	-49.63	9,198
Petersburg	12,413	89.09	1,505	10.80	15	0.11	10,908	78.29	13,933
Pittsylvania	11,509	34.33	21,993	65.60	24	0.07	-10,484	-31.27	33,526
Poquoson	2,212	28.31	5,594	71.60	7	0.09	-3,382	-43.29	7,813
Portsmouth	31,520	71.97	12,241	27.95	35	0.08	19,279	44.02	43,796
Powhatan	5,660	28.82	13,972	71.14	8	0.04	-8,312	-42.32	19,640
Prince Edward	5,195	54.68	4,291	45.17	14	0.15	904	9.52	9,500
Prince George	7,199	42.22	9,842	57.72	10	0.06	-2,643	-15.50	17,051
Prince William	144,162	64.24	80,070	35.68	183	0.08	64,092	28.56	224,415
Pulaski	5,941	34.63	11,203	65.29	14	0.08	-5,262	-30.67	17,158
Radford	3,551	56.82	2,690	43.04	9	0.14	861	13.78	6,250
Rappahannock	2,219	44.76	2,734	55.15	4	0.08	-515	-10.39	4,957
Richmond City	91,222	83.27	18,205	16.62	124	0.11	73,017	66.65	109,551
Richmond County	1,687	41.79	2,347	58.14	3	0.07	-660	-16.35	4,037
Roanoke City	28,345	66.08	14,499	33.80	50	0.12	13,846	32.28	42,894
Roanoke County	24,043	42.38	32,642	57.54	48	0.08	-8,599	-15.16	56,733
Rockbridge	4,631	37.73	7,637	62.22	6	0.05	-3,006	-24.49	12,274
Rockingham	13,739	31.61	29,700	68.33	29	0.07	-15,961	-36.72	43,468
Russell	3,288	24.79	9,962	75.11	13	0.10	-6,674	-50.32	13,263
Salem	5,697	44.02	7,235	55.90	11	0.08	-1,538	-11.88	12,943
Scott	2,191	20.38	8,543	79.46	17	0.16	-6,352	-59.08	10,751
Shenandoah	7,313	31.06	16,223	68.89	12	0.05	-8,910	-37.84	23,548
Smyth	3,973	28.38	10,013	71.52	15	0.11	-6,040	-43.14	14,001
Southampton	4,123	42.88	5,492	57.12	0	0.00	-1,369	-14.24	9,615
Spotsylvania	35,485	47.50	39,120	52.37	98	0.13	-3,635	-4.87	74,703
Stafford	40,566	51.97	37,389	47.90	100	0.13	3,177	4.07	78,055
Staunton	7,289	56.72	5,546	43.16	15	0.12	1,743	13.56	12,850
Suffolk	29,275	59.41	19,955	40.50	45	0.09	9,320	18.91	49,275
Surry	2,439	55.43	1,958	44.50	3	0.07	481	10.93	4,400
Sussex	2,924	57.62	2,146	42.29	5	0.10	778	15.33	5,075
Tazewell	4,504	23.03	15,033	76.87	20	0.10	-10,529	-53.84	19,557
Virginia Beach	120,753	53.91	103,037	46.00	202	0.09	17,716	7.91	223,992
Warren	7,075	33.73	13,874	66.15	24	0.11	-6,799	-32.42	20,973
Washington	7,744	27.24	20,656	72.66	27	0.09	-12,912	-45.42	28,427
Waynesboro	5,275	49.71	5,324	50.17	12	0.11	-49	-0.46	10,611
Westmoreland	4,821	49.02	5,009	50.94	4	0.04	-188	-1.91	9,834
Williamsburg	4,811	70.33	2,020	29.53	10	0.15	2,791	40.80	6,841
Winchester	6,898	57.58	5,076	42.37	6	0.05	1,822	15.21	11,980
Wise	4,128	25.41	12,096	74.46	21	0.13	-7,968	-49.05	16,245
Wythe	4,043	27.24	10,787	72.68	12	0.08	-6,744	-45.44	14,842
York	18,025	46.73	20,524	53.21	20	0.05	-2,499	-6.48	38,569
Totals	2,466,500	55.99	1,934,199	43.91	4,388	0.10	532,301	12.08	4,405,087

Counties and independent cities that flipped from Democratic to Republican

- Alleghany (largest municipality: Clifton Forge)
- Covington (independent city)

Counties and independent cities that flipped from Republican to Democratic

- Chesapeake (independent city)
- Chesterfield (largest municipality: Chester)
- Essex (largest municipality: Tappahannock)
- James City (no municipalities)
- Loudoun (largest municipality: Leesburg)
- Lynchburg (independent city)
- Stafford (largest municipality: Aquia Harbour)
- Staunton (independent city)
- Virginia Beach (independent city)
- Winchester (independent city)

==== By congressional district ====
Warner won seven of 11 congressional districts.

District	Warner	Gade	Representative
1st	49%	51%	Rob Wittman
2nd	54%	46%	Elaine Luria
3rd	69%	31%	Bobby Scott
4th	63%	37%	Donald McEachin
5th	48%	52%	Denver Riggleman
5th	48%	52%	Bob Good
6th	42%	58%	Ben Cline
7th	51%	49%	Abigail Spanberger
8th	76%	23%	Don Beyer
9th	34%	66%	Morgan Griffith
10th	59%	41%	Jennifer Wexton
11th	70%	30%	Gerry Connolly
