= Virginia's 25th Senate district =

American legislative district

Virginia's 25th State Senate district
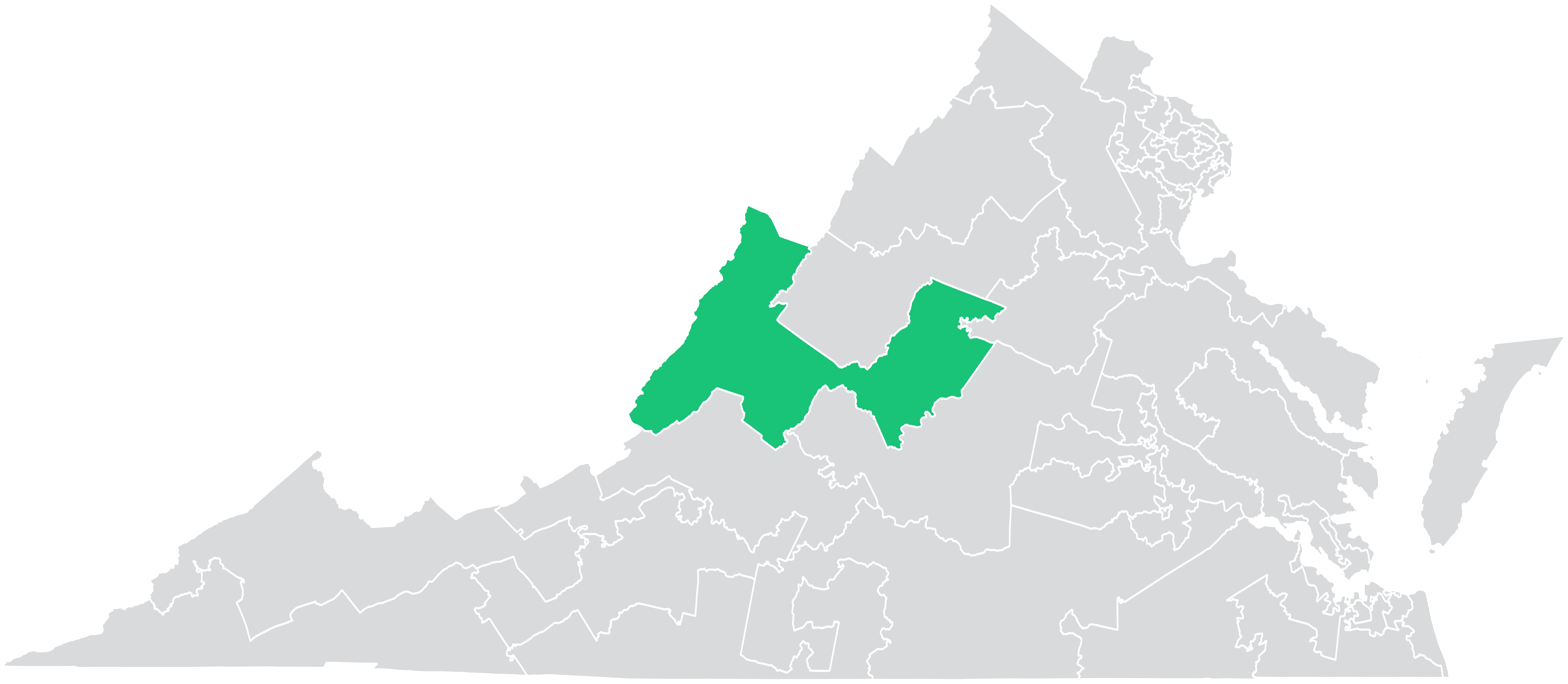
Senator
Richard Stuart; R–Montross
- Demographics: 79% White; 10% Black; 5% Hispanic; 4% Asian; 2% Other
- Population (2019): 205,202
- Registered voters: 145,829

Virginia's 25th Senate district is one of 40 districts in the Senate of Virginia. Since 2024 it has been represented by Republican Richard Stuart. Prior to 2024 redistricting, Stuart represented Virginia's 28th Senate district.

== Geography ==
District 25 is located in northeastern Virginia. The district encompasses the Northern Neck and the Middle Peninsula, and includes the counties of Caroline, Essex, King George, King William, Lancaster, Middlesex, Northumberland, Richmond, Westmoreland, and portions of King and Queen and Spotsylvania.

The district overlaps with Virginia's 1st and 7th congressional districts, and with the 66th, 67th, and 68th districts of the Virginia House of Delegates.

== Recent election results ==
=== 2019 ===
County and independent city results Deeds: 50–60%; 60–70%; 70–80%; 80–90%; Harding: 50–60%

2019 Virginia Senate election, District 25
Party	Candidate	Votes	%
Democratic	Creigh Deeds (incumbent)	44,778	67.5
Independent	Elliott Harding	21,319	32.1
Write-in		242	0.4
Total votes		66,339	100
Democratic hold			

=== 2015 ===
2015 Virginia Senate election, District 25
Party	Candidate	Votes	%
Democratic	Creigh Deeds (incumbent)	34,419	97.2
Write-in		984	2.8
Total votes		35,403	100
Democratic hold			

=== 2011 ===
County and independent city results Deeds: 50–60%; 60–70%; 70–80%; 80–90%

2011 Virginia Senate election, District 25
Party	Candidate	Votes	%
Democratic	Creigh Deeds (incumbent)	32,409	64.4
Republican	Thomas Aldous	17,862	35.5
Write-in		50	0.1
Total votes		50,321	100
Democratic hold			

=== Federal and statewide results ===
Year	Office	Results
2020	President	Biden 56.6–41.6%
2017	Governor	Northam 59.7–39.2%
2016	President	Clinton 54.7–39.3%
2014	Senate	Warner 55.3–41.1%
2013	Governor	McAuliffe 53.7–37.1%
2012	President	Obama 55.5–42.9%
2012	Senate	Kaine 57.5–42.5%

== Historical results ==
All election results below took place prior to 2011 redistricting, and thus were under different district lines.

=== 2007 ===
2007 Virginia Senate election, District 25
Party	Candidate	Votes	%
Democratic	Creigh Deeds (incumbent)	33,339	98.8
Total votes		33,747	100
Democratic hold			

=== 2003 ===
2003 Virginia Senate election, District 25
Party	Candidate	Votes	%
Democratic	Creigh Deeds (incumbent)	25,015	98.4
Total votes		25,425	100
Democratic hold			

=== 2001 special ===
2001 Virginia Senate special election, District 25
Party	Candidate	Votes	%
Democratic	Creigh Deeds	20,094	68.7
Republican	Jane Maddux	9,117	31.2
Total votes		29,233	100
Democratic hold			

=== 1999 ===
1999 Virginia Senate election, District 25
Party	Candidate	Votes	%
Democratic	Emily Couric (incumbent)	26,817	65.6
Republican	Jane Maddux	14,004	34.3
Total votes		40,850	100
Democratic hold			

=== 1995 ===
1995 Virginia Senate election, District 25
Party	Candidate	Votes	%
Democratic	Emily Couric	23,158	50.1
Republican	Edgar Robb (incumbent)	20,888	45.2
Independent	Donal Day	1,725	3.7
Independent	Eric Strzepek	427	0.9
Total votes		46,224	100
Democratic hold			
