= Paul W. Manns =

American newspaperman and politician

Paul Manns
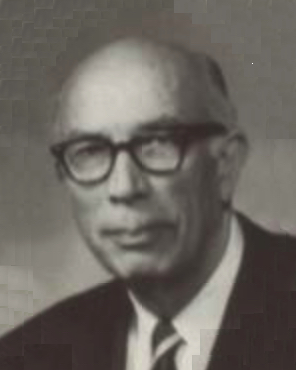

Member of the Virginia Senate from the 28th district
- In office January 12, 1972 – March 16, 1978
- Preceded by: Hunter Andrews
- Succeeded by: John Chichester

Member of the Virginia Senate from the 23rd district
- In office January 12, 1966 – January 12, 1972
- Succeeded by: Robert S. Burruss Jr.

Member of the Virginia House of Delegates for Caroline, Essex, and King and Queen
- In office January 9, 1952 – January 12, 1966
- Preceded by: Frank B. Beazley
- Succeeded by: Julien J. Mason

Personal details
- Born: Paul Wilbur Manns; June 18, 1910 Traverse City, Michigan, U.S.
- Died: March 16, 1978 (aged 67) Richmond, Virginia, U.S.
- Party: Democratic
- Spouse: Emma Nunnally

Paul Wilbur Manns (June 18, 1910 – March 16, 1978) was an American newspaperman and politician who served in both houses of the Virginia General Assembly. First elected to the Senate in 1965, he served until his death in 1978. At the time, he was chairman of the Senate transportation committee.
