= Richard Stuart =

American politician from Virginia

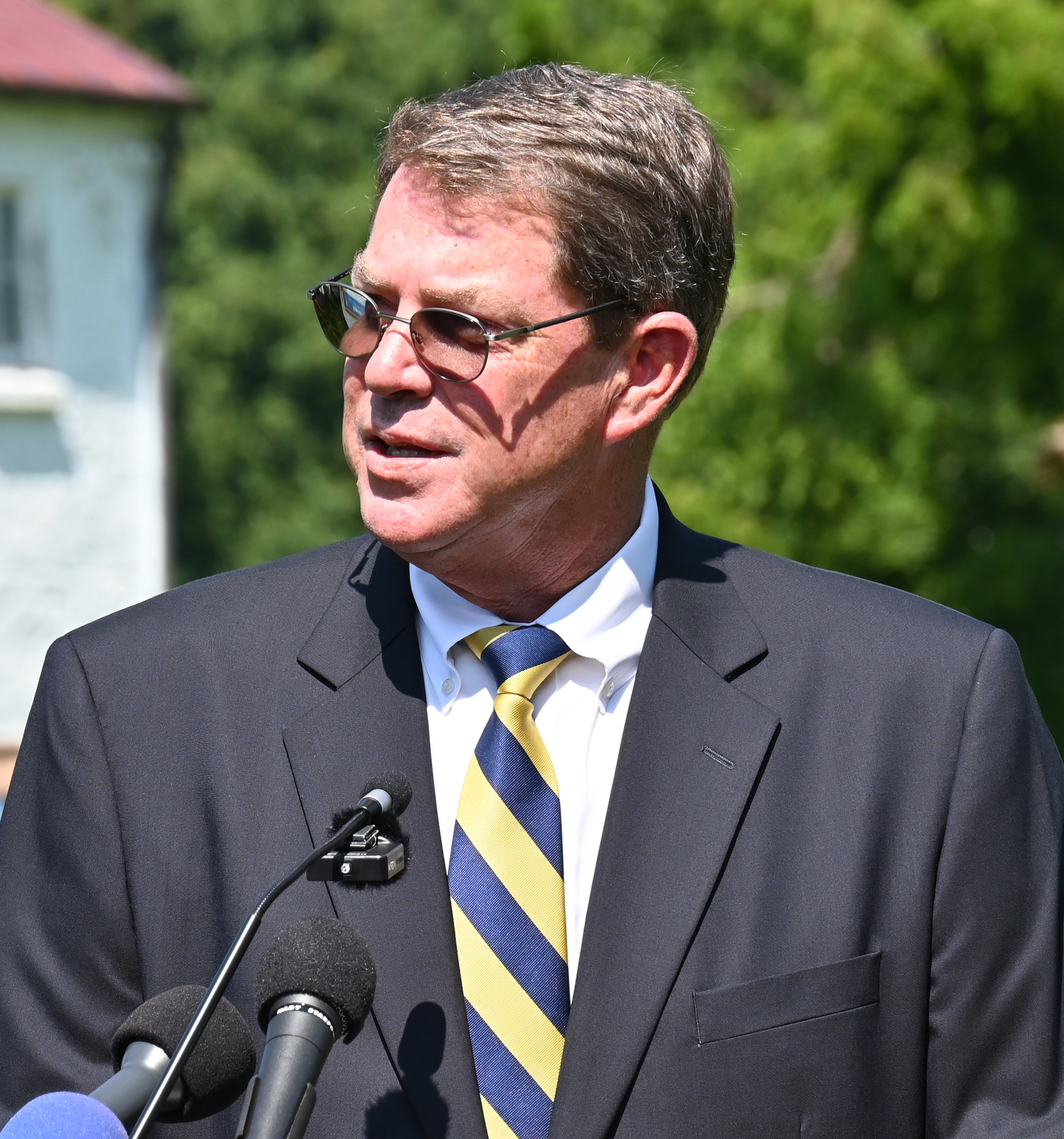
- Stuart in 2021

Member of the Virginia Senate
- Incumbent
- Assumed office January 9, 2008
- Preceded by: John Chichester
- Constituency: 28th District (2008–2024); 25th District (since 2024)

Personal details
- Born: Richard Henry Stuart; January 6, 1964 (age 62) Fredericksburg, Virginia, U.S.
- Party: Republican
- Spouse: Lisa
- Children: 3
- Education: Virginia Wesleyan College (BA); University of Richmond (JD)
- Profession: Attorney
- Website: www.stuartforsenate.com

Military service
- Branch/service: United States Marine Corps
- Years of service: 1984–1992

Richard Henry Stuart (born January 6, 1964) is an American politician and attorney. A Republican, he was elected to the Senate of Virginia in November 2007. He currently represents the 25th district, made up of nine counties and parts of two others in the Northern Neck, Middle Peninsula, and northern Piedmont, including all of Caroline County, Essex County, King George County, King William County, Lancaster County, Middlesex County, Northumberland County, Richmond County and Westmoreland County, as well as part of King and Queen County and Spotsylvania County.

== Early life and education ==
Stuart was born in Fredericksburg, Virginia. He earned a Bachelor of Arts from Virginia Wesleyan University and Juris Doctor from the University of Richmond School of Law. Stuart also studied international law at Emmanuel College, Cambridge.

== Career ==
Stuart represented Virginia's 28th Senate district from 2008 to 2024. Redistricting caused Stuart to run for and win election in Virginia's 25th Senate district in 2023. He sits on the following Senate committees: Agriculture, Conservation and Natural Resources; Commerce and Labor; Courts of Justice; and Finance.

=== Education reform ===
Stuart has advocated for allowing students to approve tuition increases at Virginia public colleges and universities. In 2019, he introduced a bill that would require students to vote on proposed tuition increases before the governing board is able to vote on them. Under the proposed legislation, a two-thirds majority of students would need to approve them.

=== Robert E. Lee speech ===
In February 2018, Stuart gave a speech praising Robert E. Lee, resulting in Lieutenant Governor Justin Fairfax, who normally presided over the Virginia Senate, choosing to walk off the podium rather than preside over the Senate during the speech.

=== Combined sewer overflow reform ===
Stuart has been a pivotal figure in spearheading efforts to tackle combined sewer overflow outfalls in Virginia, with a particular focus on the cities of Richmond and Alexandria.

== Personal life ==
In 2016 he bought a 1,400-acre (2.2 sq mi) riverfront conservation easement near the Potomac River known as Stuart Plantation, and moved there with his family. The property was the site of a former plantation that had been in his family for generations until it was sold during the Great Depression. He was surprised to discover that riprap along the river shore contained cemetery headstones. Research by Virginia historians discovered that the markers were from Columbian Harmony Cemetery, a historic African-American burial ground in Washington, D.C., that was established in 1859 by the first burial society for free Blacks. It was in active use until 1959, then dug up and relocated in 1960. Approximately 37,000 bodies were reburied at National Harmony Memorial Park in Maryland, but the headstones were sold as scrap, including use in riprap. A nonprofit organization was formed to reclaim the gravestones, and as many as possible will be given to National Harmony. Stuart said he will work to create a park-like memorial along the Potomac to recognize any headstones that cannot be reclaimed.

Senate of Virginia
Preceded by John Chichester	Member of the Virginia Senate from the 28th district 2008–2024	Succeeded by Bryce Reeves
Preceded by Creigh Deeds	Member of the Virginia Senate from the 25th district 2024–Present	Incumbent
