= John Chichester (American politician) =

American politician

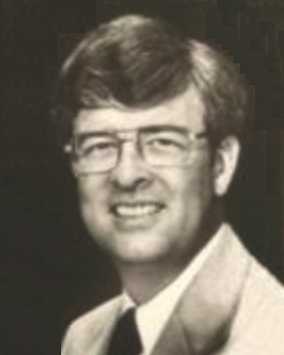

President pro tempore of the Virginia Senate
- In office January 12, 2000 – January 9, 2008
- Preceded by: Stanley C. Walker
- Succeeded by: Chuck Colgan

Member of the Virginia Senate from the 28th district
- In office November 1978 – January 9, 2008
- Preceded by: Paul Manns
- Succeeded by: Richard Stuart

Personal details
- Born: John Hansford Chichester; August 26, 1937 (age 89) Fredericksburg, Virginia, U.S.
- Party: Republican, formerly Democrat
- Spouse: Karen Williams
- Education: Virginia Tech

John Hansford Chichester (born August 26, 1937) was the President Pro Tempore of the Virginia Senate. He represented the 28th district in the Senate from 1978 to 2007.

== Biography ==
Chichester first entered the Virginia Senate by winning a special election necessitated by the death of Paul Manns. He was approached to replace retiring Congressman J. Kenneth Robinson in 1984, but declined. Chichester won the 1985 Republican nomination for lieutenant governor, but was defeated in the general election by state senator L. Douglas Wilder, who would go on to become the first African-American state governor since Reconstruction.

Chichester returned to the Senate, where he accumulated seniority and was mentored by Democratic state senator Hunter Andrews. In 1995 Andrews was defeated for reelection, and under a powersharing agreement in a body split 20–20, Chichester became co-chair of the Senate Finance Committee. When the GOP achieved majority status in 1999, he became the chairman of the Senate Finance Committee.

Serving in that capacity he was criticized by conservatives for his positions on fiscal policy and has been praised by the business community for his concern over the infrastructure requirements in order for Virginia to compete in a global market. He announced his retirement from the Virginia Senate in March 2007.
