= Bert Mizusawa =

United States Army Major General (born 1957)

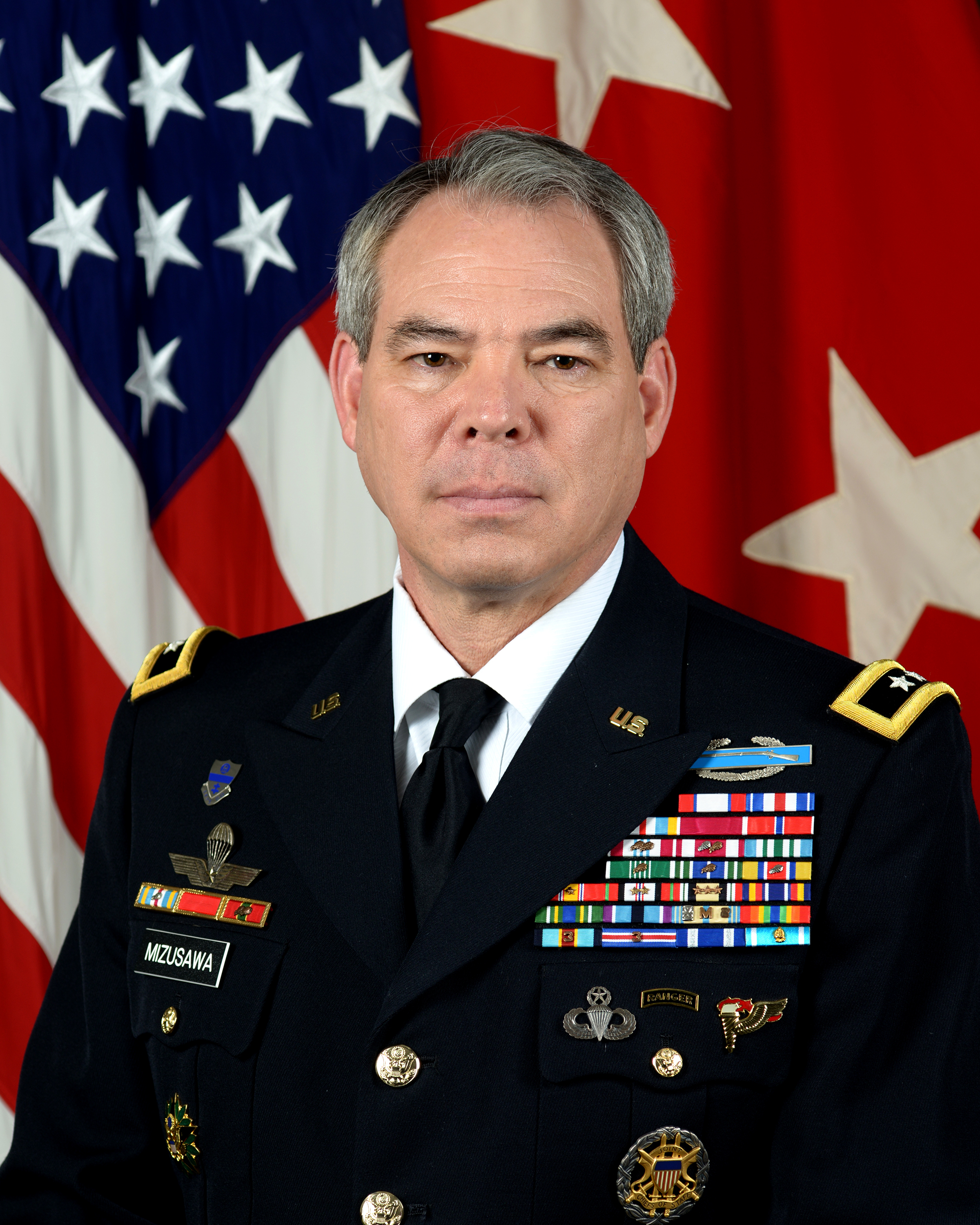
- Official portrait, 2016
- Born: Bert Kameaaloha Mizusawa; January 1957 (age 69); Honolulu, Hawaii Territory, U.S.
- Education: United States Military Academy (BS); Harvard University (JD, MPP)
- Military career
- Branch: United States Army
- Service years: 1979–2015
- Rank: Major General
- Awards: Distinguished Service Medal; Silver Star; Defense Superior Service Medal; Legion of Merit; Bronze Star Medal; Combat Infantryman; Master Parachutist; Ranger; Air Assault; Joint Chiefs of Staff Identification Badge; Humanitarian Service Medal; Meritorious Civilian Service Award
- Website: Campaign website

Bert Kameaaloha Mizusawa (born January 1957) is a retired major general in the United States Army, serving in the Army from 1979 to 2015. Mizusawa also served in the United States Senate as a professional staff member and as a Senior Executive in the Pentagon, making him one of only a handful of individuals to serve at flag rank in the military as well as in the legislative branch. Mizusawa is also an attorney and is admitted to the bars of New York, the District of Columbia, Virginia and the United States Supreme Court. He was the Republican nominee for the 2026 United States Senate election in Virginia, facing off against and losing to incumbent Democrat Mark Warner.

== Early life and education ==
Mizusawa was born January 1957 in Honolulu, Hawaii. Mizusawa is the second of six sons born to George T. and Theodora Mizusawa (née Berghuis). Mizusawa's father met his Dutch mother in Europe while serving in the United States Army. Soon thereafter Mizusawa's father enlisted in the United States Air Force, and Mizusawa grew up in the Netherlands, Oklahoma, Ohio, Japan, Virginia, and Germany before his family settled in Hampton, Virginia.

Mizusawa attended high school in Kaiserslautern and Frankfurt, Germany and in 1975 he graduated from Kecoughtan High School in Hampton, Virginia. While in high school Mizusawa participated in varsity football, wrestling, and track.

West Point

In 1975, Mizusawa was accepted to the United States Military Academy. While at West Point he served in the Cadet Captain position as Brigade Athletic Officer. On June 6, 1979, Mizusawa received his bachelor's degree from then Deputy Secretary of Defense, Charles W. Duncan, Jr., and graduated as the "number one man"—first in his class.

Harvard

Mizusawa attended Harvard Law School and graduated with a Juris Doctor in 1989. He also received a Master of Public Policy from the John F. Kennedy School of Government and was twice selected as a MacArthur Fellow in International Security. While at Harvard, he interned with the United States Attorneys' Counterdrug Task Force.

== Military career ==
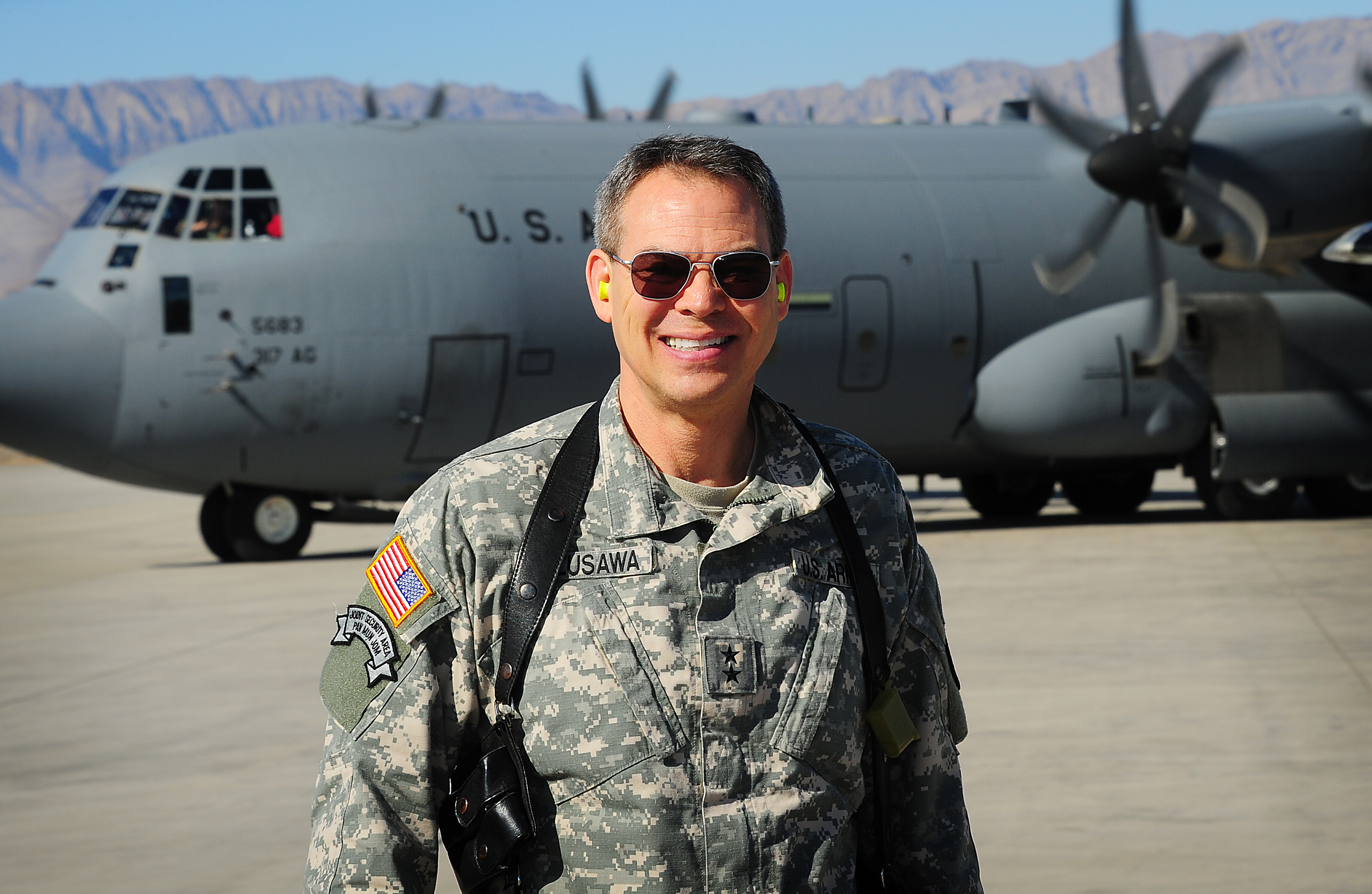
Mizusawa while visiting the Multi National Base Tarin Kot in 2012.

Graduating as top man on the list, Mizusawa received his first choice in the USMA Corps of Cadets' branch drawings—infantry.

=== Captain ===
As a captain, Mizusawa, an Airborne Ranger, served as a paratrooper in Italy with the 1-509th Airborne Battalion Combat Team and commanded the Army's most forward-deployed combat unit, the Joint Security Force, in the Korean DMZ.

==== 1983 Soviet defector incident ====
Mizusawa led the Joint Security Force in a historic firefight against North Korean forces.

Mizusawa was awarded the Silver Star for “exceptional valor and gallantry in action” while serving as the Commander of the Joint Security Force (JSF) Company at Panmunjom, Korea on 22 and 23 November 1984. His citation reads “In reaction to thirty attacking North Korean soldiers in pursuit of a Soviet defector, Captain Mizusawa's outstanding leadership and aggressive actions in leading his company while under fire were instrumental in defeating the enemy. Additionally, he personally led the defector to safety while under fire and deliberately, at great risk to himself, exposed himself to the enemy in front of his own troops to ensure the success of his company's combat action. Throughout the intense firefight, Captain Mizusawa displayed a complete disregard for his own personal safety while accomplishing his mission.”

=== Colonel ===
From 2001 to 2004, Mizusawa was assigned as the first commander of the Army Reserve's new cyber command, the Army Reserve Information Operations Command. In 2005, he commanded the first team deployed to Afghanistan from the Joint Center of Operational Analyses.

=== Brigadier general ===
As a brigadier general, Mizusawa served as the Deputy G3 (Operations) of the U.S. Army Materiel Command, as Deputy to the Commanding General, Multinational Corps-Iraq and as the Deputy Commanding General of the 335th Theater Signal Command.

=== Major general ===
On August 2, 2011, Mizusawa was promoted to major general and assumed the assignment of deputy director for Strategic Initiatives, Joint Chiefs of Staff. He later served as the reserve assistant to the chairman, Joint Chiefs of Staff and as commander of the Combined Joint Interagency Task Force-Afghanistan (CJIATF-A), which was awarded the Joint Meritorious Unit Award for its performance during Operation Enduring Freedom.

== Civilian career ==
=== Private sector ===
Mizusawa was an attorney with the Wall Street law firm Sullivan & Cromwell from 1990 to 1994, where he advised underwriters on complex debt and equity issuances. He was lead attorney for the largest debt offerings in the world at the time, the World Bank's US$2.5 billion Global Bonds, which were issued simultaneously in New York, London and Tokyo. From 2001 to 2004, Mizusawa was president of Innovative Technology Application, Inc., a technology firm with multimedia and industrial security products. In 2004, Mizusawa founded Paxcentric, Inc., a technology and security consulting firm.

=== Government and politics ===
From 1995 to 1998, Mizusawa was appointed as a Professional Staff Member on the United States Senate Committee on Armed Services, where he assisted the chairman with oversight of national defense. In 1996, he authored the GOP national security platform for the presidential campaign. In 1998, he was appointed as a three-star level Senior Executive in The Pentagon.

In 2010, Mizusawa unsuccessfully ran for a U.S. Congress seat from Virginia. In May 2016, during the 2016 Republican presidential primary process, Mizusawa endorsed the candidacy of Donald Trump and soon thereafter became a foreign policy advisor to the Trump campaign. He authored the Trump doctrine for foreign policy, versions of which were published by USA Today online and in its print edition. Mizusawa was director of national security policy for the Trump's Presidential Transition Team. In 2018, he launched a campaign for the GOP nomination to challenge U.S. Senator Tim Kaine, but failed to collect enough signatures to make the ballot.

In early 2020, Mizusawa was appointed as a senior adviser for national security technology and business integration at the Central Intelligence Agency.

== Articles ==
- Decentralized information age training: key to U.S. antiterrorism efforts. (Homeland Security) — (Sep. 2003) Colonel Mizusawa discusses the application of decentralized information age training in coping with the homeland security threat posed by terrorism in the U.S. Colonel Mizusawa also discusses the advantage of the application for city and country leadership; challenges in the deployment process; and drawbacks of Internet-based applications.

== Mentions ==
- Dangerous Games: faces, incidents and casualties of the Cold War by James E. Wise, Jr., and Scott Baron. Naval Institute Press (2010): Annapolis, Maryland
- The Reagan Diaries edited by Douglas Brinkley. The Ronald Reagan Presidential Library Foundation (2007): New York, New York (Referencing Soviet Defector Incident in Korean DMZ)

Party political offices
Preceded by Daniel Gade	Republican nominee for U.S. Senator from Virginia (Class 2); 2026	Most recent
