= Daniel Gade =

Retired U.S. Army officer, academic, author, politician (born 1975)

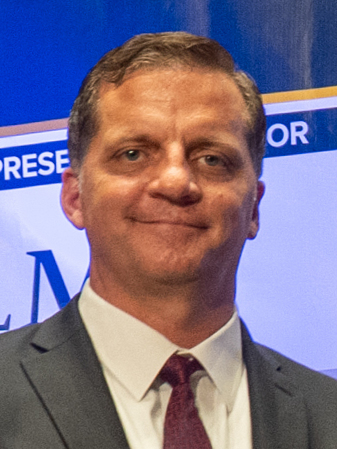
- Gade in 2023

Commissioner of the Virginia Department of Veterans Services
- In office January 4, 2022 – January 14, 2024
- Succeeded by: Chuck Zingler

Personal details
- Born: Daniel MacArthur Gade; February 7, 1975 (age 51) Minot, North Dakota, U.S.
- Party: Republican
- Spouse: Wendy Williams
- Children: 3
- Education: United States Military Academy (BS); University of Georgia (MPA, PhD)

Military service
- Allegiance: United States
- Branch/service: United States Army
- Years of service: 1992–2017
- Rank: Lieutenant colonel
- Battles/wars: Iraq War
- Awards: Legion of Merit; Bronze Star Medal; Purple Heart (2)

Daniel MacArthur Gade (born February 7, 1975) is an American critic of United States veterans' services and disability policies, a former political candidate, a professor and researcher, and a United States government contractor. In 2005, Gade became an amputee after receiving wounds while serving as a company commander in Ramadi, Iraq. In 2017, Gade retired from the United States Army as a Lieutenant Colonel. Gade was the Republican nominee for the 2020 election to represent Virginia in the United States Senate losing to incumbent Democrat Mark Warner. He served as the Commissioner of the Virginia Department of Veterans Services from 2022 to 2024.

== Early life and education ==
Daniel MacArthur Gade was born on February 7, 1975, and raised in Minot, North Dakota. In 1997, he graduated from the United States Military Academy (West Point) with a Bachelor of Science in Environmental Science. Gade graduated with a Master of Public Administration and a Doctor of Philosophy in public administration and public policy from the University of Georgia in 2007 and 2011, respectively.

== Career ==
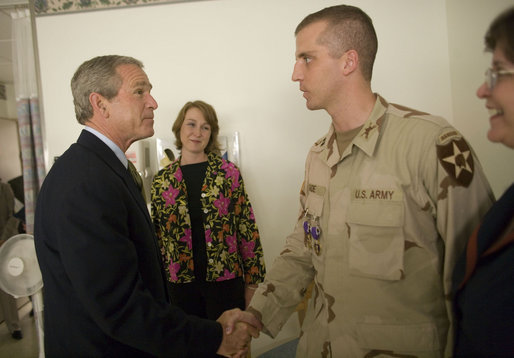
Gade with President George W. Bush in 2005

Gade was wounded in action twice and decorated for valor while serving as a tank company commander in Iraq. After Gade's second injury, his entire right leg was amputated. He was awarded the Bronze Star and the Legion of Merit.

Gade has been a vocal critic of veterans' services and disability policies and equated the VA’s monthly payments to qualifying veterans as a system that rewards unemployment and disengagement. Rather, Gade advocates for a system that encourages self-reliance and vocational rehabilitation. He has authored a couple of scholarly articles in that field, most notably in Health Economics and the Journal of Public Administration Research and Theory. In 2012, Gade began serving as an advisor at the Philanthropy Roundtable for its veterans work. In 2013, he published an article in National Affairs about disability benefits and their failure to achieve positive outcomes for disabled veterans. In 2013, Gade authored an article in The Wall Street Journal arguing that disability claims in the United States Department of Veterans Affairs backlog were due in large part to the agency's expansive definition of "disability". In 2021, Gade and Daniel Huang, a former Wall Street Journal financial reporter, co-authored a policy review book, Wounding Warriors: How Bad Policy Is Making Veterans Sicker and Poorer. Gade and Huang's book questioned the efficacy of existing disability services and posited that the VA “robs veterans of their vitality” and spawns a “culture of entitlement” among veterans and a pernicious “network of enablers.” Gade and Huang's book referred to veterans who served after 9/11 as “a generation that wants to be given everything even if they don’t deserve it.” The book also described veterans undergoing treatment for post-traumatic stress disorder as “wannabes” because they tell their therapists “stories that sound a lot like a bad day rather than a traumatic moment.” On October 29, 2025, Gade testified before a Senate Veterans' Affairs Committee that the VA system encourages veterans to be sick, that disability ratings have been misapplied and that "9 of the top 10 conditions for newly rated veterans are easily exaggerated or totally unverifiable."

Gade has been involved in politics and served in the administration of President George W. Bush. Gade then returned to West Point in 2011 until his 2017 retirement from the Army. During this period, Gade had been appointed in 2015 to the National Council on Disability by then Speaker John Boehner. In 2017, Gade was nominated to become a member of the Equal Employment Opportunity Commission but later withdrew from consideration citing the "toxic political climate in Washington."

In 2019, Gade formed an association with American University's School of Public Affairs as a Professor of Practice.

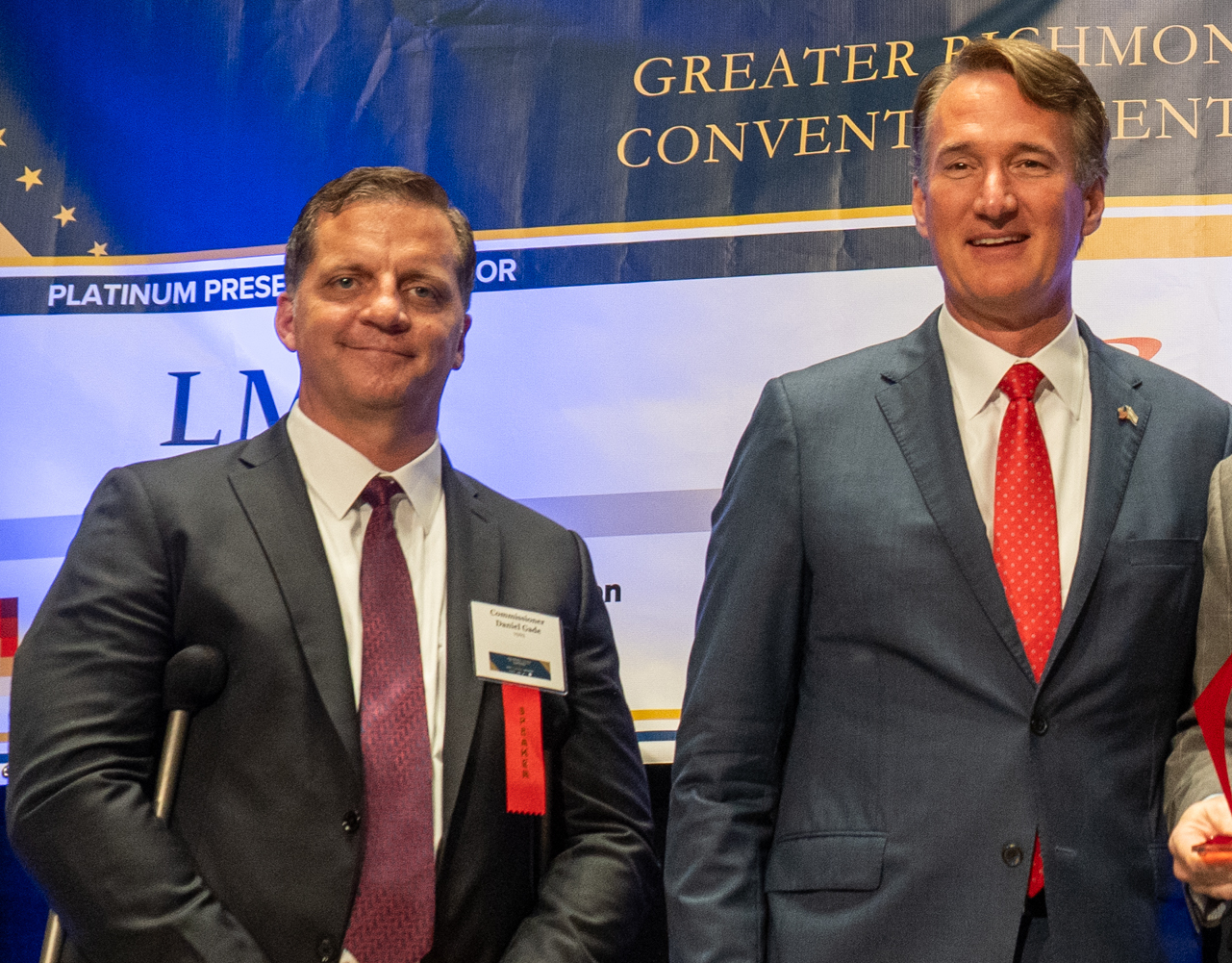
Gade with Youngkin in 2023

Governor-elect Glenn Youngkin nominated Gade in 2022 to lead the Commonwealth of Virginia Department of Veterans Services. Gade took office on January 4, 2022 and was confirmed to the position. In 2024, Gade vacated the position and became the Chief Executive Officer of his own government contracting business. Gade's business earns profits from contracts with a variety of Federal agencies including the United States Department of Defense, NASA, the United States Department of Agriculture, the United States Department of Homeland Security and the National Security Agency.

== 2020 U.S. Senate campaign ==
Gade was the Republican nominee for the 2020 election to represent Virginia in the United States Senate. He faced adjunct professor and public school teacher Alissa Baldwin and defense contractor and retired Army intelligence officer Thomas Speciale in the Republican primary. Gade became the nominee after garnering 67% of the vote while Baldwin and Speciale received 18% and 15%, respectively. The seat was held by Democrat Mark Warner. Warner defeated Gade and was re-elected with 56% of the vote; Gade received 44%.

== Personal life ==
Gade lives in Mount Vernon, Virginia, with his wife, Wendy, and their three children. He became the paralympic world champion at the 2010 Ironman 70.3 in Clearwater, Florida. President George W. Bush described cycling with Gade as "unbelievable", since he "rode with one leg, navigating some really tough trails". Gade is a competitive cyclist.

Party political offices
Preceded by Ed Gillespie	Republican nominee for U.S. Senator from Virginia (Class 2); 2020	Succeeded by Bert Mizusawa
