= Edd Houck =

American politician

Member of the Virginia Senate from the 17th district
- In office January 11, 1984 – January 11, 2012
- Preceded by: Eva Mae Fleming Scott
- Succeeded by: Bryce Reeves

Personal details
- Born: Robert Edward Houck; September 11, 1950 (age 76) Smyth County, Virginia, U.S.
- Party: Democratic
- Spouse: Dana Blankenship
- Education: Concord University (B.S.); University of Virginia (M.Ed.)
- Profession: Educator

Robert Edward "Edd" Houck (born September 11, 1950) is an American politician and educator. He served in the Senate of Virginia 1984–2012, representing the 17th district in the Virginia Piedmont as a Democrat for more than two decades.

== Early and family life ==
Houck was born in Smyth County, Virginia on September 11, 1950. He attended the local public schools and graduated from Marion Senior High School. He then attended Wytheville Community College, then Concord University and received his bachelor's degree. He also earned a master's degree in Education from the University of Virginia.

He married Dana Kee Blankenship, and is a member of Christ Episcopal Church. Their son Todd died in 2015. Their daughter Greta died in 2012.

== Career ==
Houck chose a career in education, rising to become the supervisor of special and vocational education in the Fredericksburg city schools before voters elected him in 1983 to the Virginia State Senate.

He served in the State Senate (a part-time position) from 1984–2012, representing the 17th senatorial district. Most of the bills he introduced also had Republican co-sponsors. Sen. Houck served on the Finance, Transportation, Rules, General Laws and Technology committees. Becoming the Senate's third ranking member, he was Chairman of the Senate Education and Health Committee, the Joint Commission on Health Care and of the Health and Human Resources Subcommittee. He was also the Chairman of the Freedom of Information Advisory Council and vice chairman of the Commission on the Reduction of Sexual Assault Victimization in Virginia.

Houck also served on the board of directors of the University of Virginia School of Education Foundation, and the University's Continuing Education Advisory Council, as well as the Virginia High School League Northern Virginia 4-H Educational Center, the Spotsylvania 4-H, V-QUEST, and as chancellor of the Ruritan Club and once president of Pi Kappa Alpha. He was also active in the Izaak Walton League, the Fredericksburg Area Chamber of Commerce and Phi Delta Kappa.

On November 8, 2011, Republican Bryce Reeves defeated incumbent Democrat Houck by a margin of 226 votes in his attempt, and was re-elected by a larger margin against Democrat Ned Galloway in 2015.
