= Tandem Friends School =

Quaker school in Virginia, US

Coordinates: 37°59′45″N 78°29′30″W

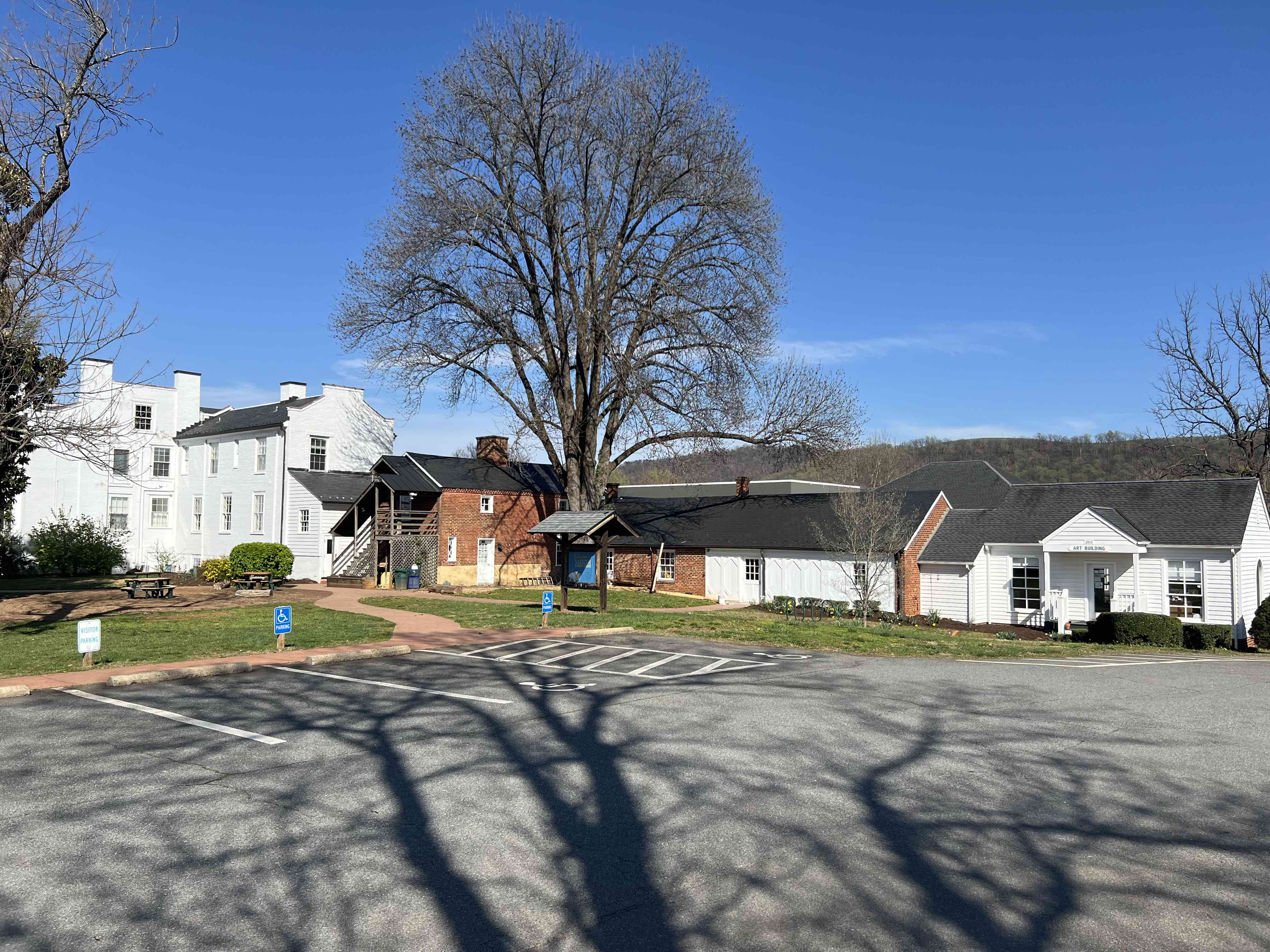

Location
- 279 Tandem Lane; Charlottesville, Virginia 22902; United States

Information
- Type: Private, Quaker
- Motto: Freedom with Responsibility; Kindness and Wisdom
- Established: 1970
- Founder: John Howard and Duncan Alling
- Headmaster: Whitney Thompson
- Teaching staff: 35
- Grades: 5-12
- Gender: Co-Educational
- Enrollment: ~250
- Campus: 30 acres
- Colors: Dark green and white
- Athletics: Greater Piedmont Athletic Conference (GPAC); Virginia Independent Schools Athletics Association (VISAA); no-cut policy; boys' soccer, girls' volleyball, co-ed cross country, boys' basketball, girls' basketball, boys' lacrosse, girls' soccer, co-ed track and field, co-ed ultimate frisbee.
- Mascot: Badgers
- Accreditation: VAIS, NAIS
- Website: tandemfs.org

Tandem Friends School is a coeducational secondary school founded in 1970 in Albemarle County, Virginia, just outside Charlottesville, by educators John Howard and Duncan Alling. In 1995, it joined the Friends Council on Education, adopting the educational beliefs and practices of the Quakers. The current head of school is Whitney Thompson. The Upper School, grades 9-12, has approximately 130 students, while the Middle School, grades 5-8, has approximately 105 students. The head of the Upper School is Russell Combs, and the head of the Middle School is Paul Cronin. The mascot is a badger and the original mascot was a tree.

== History ==
Founded in 1970, Tandem is the first Friends School in the U.S. that started as a non-Quaker School. The school is accredited by the National Association of Independent Schools and the Virginia Association of Independent Schools and is a member of the Council on Education.

== Traditions ==
Longstanding Tandem traditions include Morning Meeting, Meeting for Worship, Work Crew, Spring Day, Blue Ridge Day, Speaker Series, Emphasis Week, Experience Days, Open Mic, Sophomore Seminars, and Senior Projects.

The Saturday before Mother's Day has been the date of the annual Mother's Day Music Festival, a small festival to honor mothers and to showcase local musicians. A notable past act to play on the quad at Tandem Friends School for the Mother's Day Music Festival was Dave Matthews on May 12, 1991 and May 10, 1992 which included bassist Stefan Lessard who was a student at Tandem at the time.

== Athletics ==
Tandem Friends School fields up to eighteen sports teams and maintains a no-cut policy. The school's JV and varsity teams compete in the Greater Piedmont Athletic Conference (GPAC). Middle School athletic teams compete with various other middle schools in the surrounding area. The Varsity Girls' Soccer Team won the VISAA Division II State Championship in the Spring of 2010, and repeated in Spring of 2011 and Spring of 2012. Additionally, the Varsity Boys' Cross Cross Country Team won the VISAA Division II State Championships in the fall of 2023 and 2024.

== Arts Program ==
Tandem Friends School has an Arts program that encompasses visual arts, drama, and music. Drama and art are each taught for one semester each year in the Middle School grades. Art electives abound in the Upper School, as well as drama classes and an after-school drama program that presents a musical in the fall, a one-act play festival in the winter, and a comedy or drama in the spring.

5th through 7th graders take regular music classes. The school has a jazz band, Rock and Roll bands, as well as other music class offerings. Tandem sports two fully equipped music rooms, with guitars, basses, and a drum kit, as well as many other instruments for performing and recording.

== Notable alumni ==
- Stefen Lessard, member of the Dave Matthews Band.
- Kate Bollinger, pop singer-songwriter.

== Notable faculty ==
- Amy Laufer, member of the Virginia House of Delegates (2024–present)
