= Virginia's 55th House of Delegates district =

Virginia legislative district

District map from the 2023 election

Virginia's 55th House of Delegates district elects one of 100 seats in the Virginia House of Delegates, the lower house of the state's bicameral legislature. District 55 represents most of Albemarle County and parts of Nelson and Louisa counties. The seat is currently held by Democrat Amy Laufer.

== Elections ==
=== 2017 ===
In the November 2017 election, Democrat Morgan Goodman ran against incumbent Fowler.
