= Virginia's 17th Senate district =

American legislative district

Virginia's 17th State Senate district
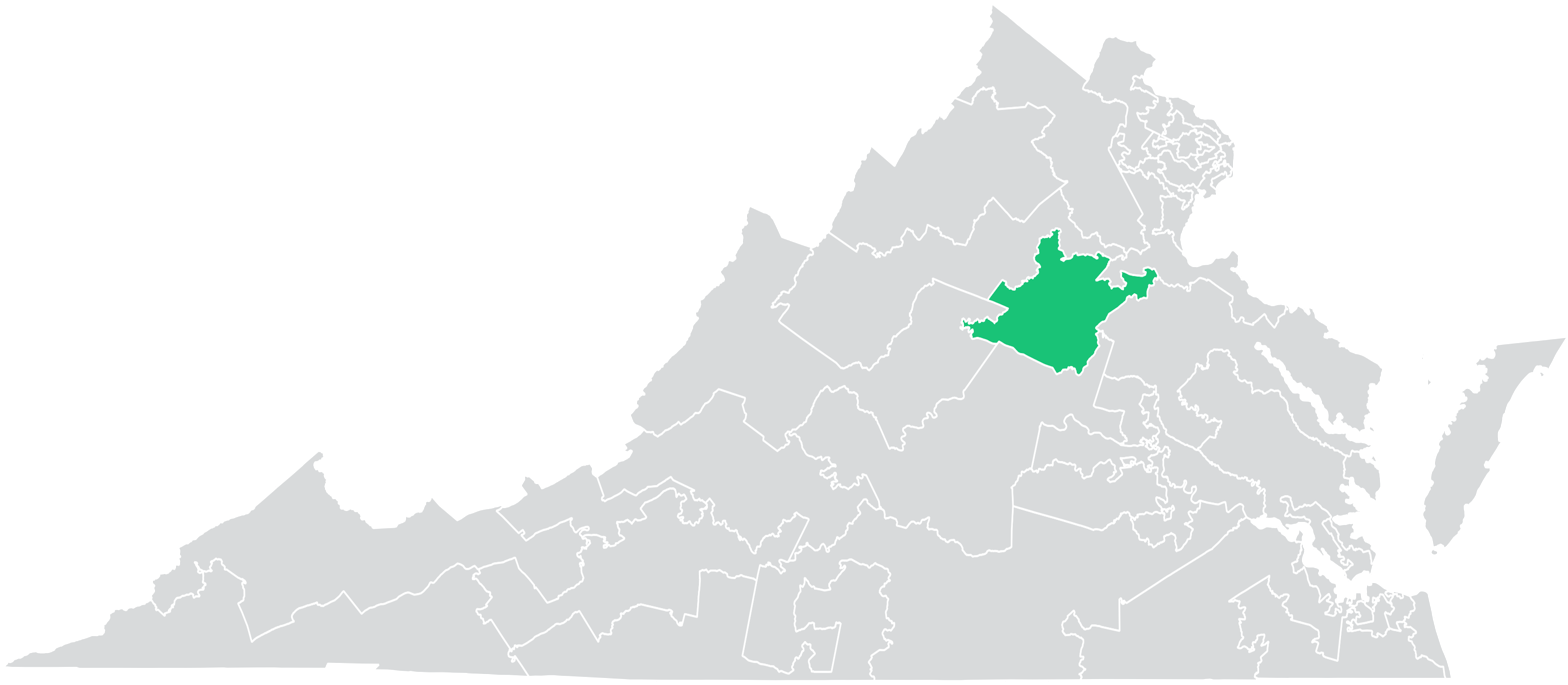
Senator
Emily Jordan; R–Suffolk
- Demographics: 68% White; 17% Black; 9% Hispanic; 2% Asian; 3% Other
- Population (2019): 223,182
- Registered voters: 157,263

Virginia's 17th Senate district is one of 40 districts in the Senate of Virginia. It has been represented by Republican Emily Jordan since 2024.

== Geography ==
District 17 is located in southeastern Virginia, including the counties of Isle of Wight, Southampton, Greensville, Brunswick, and a portion of Dinwiddie. The independent cities that are part of District 17 include Suffolk, Franklin, Emporia, and a portion of Portsmouth.

The district overlaps with Virginia's 2nd, 3rd, and 4th congressional districts, and with the 82nd, 83rd, 84th, 88th, and 89th districts of the Virginia House of Delegates.

== Recent election results ==
=== 2019 ===
County and independent city results Reeves: 50–60%; 60–70%; Laufer: 60–70%

2019 Virginia Senate election, District 17
Primary election
Party	Candidate	Votes	%
Republican	Bryce Reeves (incumbent)	6,325	82.3
Republican	Rich Breeden	1,359	17.7
Total votes		7,685	100
Democratic	Amy Laufer	6,042	78.2
Democratic	S. Ben Hixon	1,679	21.7
Total votes		7,722	100
General election
Republican	Bryce Reeves (incumbent)	34,494	51.6
Democratic	Amy Laufer	32,176	48.1
Total votes		66,878	100
Republican hold			

=== 2015 ===
County and independent city results Reeves: 60–70%; 70–80%; Gallaway: 50–60%; 60–70%

2015 Virginia Senate election, District 17
Party	Candidate	Votes	%
Republican	Bryce Reeves (incumbent)	24,519	62.1
Democratic	Ned Gallaway	14,915	37.8
Total votes		39,487	100
Republican hold			

=== 2011 ===
County and independent city results Reeves: 50–60%; Houck: 50–60%; 60–70%

2011 Virginia Senate election, District 17
Party	Candidate	Votes	%
Republican	Bryce Reeves	22,615	50.2
Democratic	Edd Houck (incumbent)	22,389	49.7
Total votes		45,084	100
Republican gain from Democratic			

=== Federal and statewide results ===
Year	Office	Results
2020	President	Biden 49.6–48.6%
2017	Governor	Northam 49.4–49.4%
2016	President	Trump 49.7–45.1%
2014	Senate	Gillespie 53.1–44.2%
2013	Governor	Cuccinelli 49.0–44.0%
2012	President	Romney 49.5–49.0%
2012	Senate	Kaine 50.7–49.3%

== Historical results ==
All election results below took place prior to 2011 redistricting, and thus were under different district lines.

=== 2007 ===
2007 Virginia Senate election, District 17
Party	Candidate	Votes	%
Democratic	Edd Houck (incumbent)	25,178	56.0
Republican	Chris Yakabouski	19,754	43.9
Total votes		44,968	100
Democratic hold			

=== 2003 ===
2003 Virginia Senate election, District 17
Party	Candidate	Votes	%
Democratic	Edd Houck (incumbent)	21,324	59.2
Republican	Robert Stuber	14,640	40.7
Total votes		35,991	100
Democratic hold			

=== 1999 ===
1999 Virginia Senate election, District 17
Party	Candidate	Votes	%
Democratic	Edd Houck (incumbent)	27,605	60.1
Republican	Andrew Sheridan	18,334	39.9
Total votes		45,953	100
Democratic hold			

=== 1995 ===
1995 Virginia Senate election, District 17
Party	Candidate	Votes	%
Democratic	Edd Houck (incumbent)	25,162	53.4
Republican	J. Russ Moulton, Jr.	21,930	46.6
Total votes		47,099	100
Democratic hold			
