= Shannon Taylor =

Shannon Taylor may refer to:

- Shannon Taylor (American football) (born 1972), American football player
- Shannon Taylor (politician) (born 1967), American attorney and politician
- Shannon Taylor (field hockey) (born 1986), American field hockey player
- Shannon Taylor (producer), American film producer and musician

== See also ==
- Shannan Taylor (born 1972), Australian boxer
