= Bryce Reeves =

American politician, business owner and veteran

Member of the Virginia Senate
- Incumbent
- Assumed office January 11, 2012
- Preceded by: Edd Houck
- Constituency: 17th district (2012–2024); 28th district (2024–present)

Personal details
- Born: Bryce Eldon Reeves; November 28, 1966 (age 59) Canoga Park, California, U.S.
- Party: Republican
- Children: 2
- Education: Texas A&M University (BS); George Mason University (MPA)
- Website: Campaign website

Bryce Eldon Reeves (born November 28, 1966) is an American politician and United States Army veteran who has been serving as a member of the Senate of Virginia since 2012.

A State Farm insurance agent, he was elected in 2011. Reeves defeated the 28-year Democratic incumbent, Edd Houck, by 226 votes.

Reeves was a candidate in the 2017 Virginia lieutenant gubernatorial Republican primary election, the 2022 U.S. House election in the 7th district, and in the 2026 United States Senate election in Virginia.

== Virginia State Senate ==
A State Farm insurance agent, he was elected in 2011. Reeves defeated the 28-year Democratic incumbent, Edd Houck, by 226 votes.

In May 2023, Reeves defeated Mike Allers to win the Republican nomination for the newly drawn 28th Senate district. Governor Glenn Youngkin endorsed Reeves. As of November 7, 2023, Reeves was elected to represent the newly drawn 28th district of Virginia, which represents Culpeper County, Greene County, Madison County, Orange County, Rappahannock County and parts of both Fauquier County and Spotsylvania County. Reeves serves on the Commerce and Labor, Finance and Appropriations, General Laws and Technology, and the Rehabilitation and Social Services committees. The commissions he serves on include the Joint Subcommittee for Health and Human Resources Oversight, the Virginia Military Advisory Council (VMAC), the Rappahannock River Basin Commission (RRBC), the Commission on Military Installations and Defense Activities (COMIDA), and the Secure and Resilient Commonwealth Panel. He currently serves as the Chair of the Subcommittee to Study the Feasibility of Establishing the Virginia Gaming Commission. He is also co-chair of the General Assembly Military and Veterans Caucus (GAMVC), as well as co-chair of the National Conference of State Legislatures' Military and Veterans Affairs Task Force.

=== Major legislative initiatives, passed ===
- SB 7 Hate crimes and discrimination; ethnic animosity, nondiscrimination in employment, etc., penalties. A bill to amend Virginia's hate crime code, providing a more all encompassing approach to the way hate crimes are prosecuted. The bill was touted as a way to combat rising antisemitism in Virginia.
- SB 836 Problem Gambling Treatment and Support Advisory Committee; established. A bill directing Virginia's Department of Behavioral Health and Developmental Services to form and maintain the Problem Gambling Treatment and Support Advisory Committee.
- SB 1188 Weapon of terrorism; definition, penalty. A bill that amended Virginia's definition of a "weapon of terrorism" to include non-medical use fentanyl. The bill also established a new class 4 felony in the Commonwealth of Virginia for the intentional manufacturing or distribution of non-medical use fentanyl.
- SB1208 Virginia-Taiwan Trade Office; Virginia Economic Development Partnership Authority to establish. A bill that originally directed the Virginia Economic Development Partnership Authority to establish a trade office with the government of Taiwan. The bill was amended in committee to instead direct the Virginia Economic Development Partnership Authority to conduct a cost-benefit analysis cooperating with the government of Taiwan to establish a trade office. The cost-benefit analysis showed Virginia stood to gain from opening a trade office with Taiwan, and led to Governor Glenn Youngkin's Executive Order 25.
- SB 327 Arrest and summons quotas; prohibition. A bill that prohibited Virginia's law enforcement agencies, at all levels, from establishing arrest or summons quotas.
- SB 528 Income tax, state; military benefits subtraction. A bill that established major income tax subtractions for military veterans.
- SB 530 Illegal gaming devices; manufacturing, etc., device, civil penalty. A bill established a new civil penalty for the illegal manufacturing, sale, or distribution of electronic gambling devices not authorized to operate within the Commonwealth of Virginia.
- SB 768 Virginia Military Survivors and Dependents Education Program; tuition and fee waivers. A bill that expanded the Virginia Military Survivors and Dependents Education Program to include the stepchild of a deceased veteran.
- SB 769 Unemployment compensation; program integrity activities, improper claims, report, effective date. A bill that directed the Virginia Employment Commission to conduct eligibility verification procedures for unemployment benefits per Department of Labor recommendations. The bill also gave the Virginia Employment Commission greater liberties to investigate fraudulent filings.

== Subsequent campaigns ==
=== 2017 Virginia lieutenant gubernatorial campaign ===
Reeves was a candidate in the 2017 Virginia lieutenant gubernatorial election. He received the endorsement of Ed Meese. Reeves placed second in the Republican primary with 40.03% of the vote to Jill Vogel.

=== 2022 U.S. House campaign ===
Reeves was a candidate in the 2022 U.S. House election in the 7th district. He received the endorsements of Rick Perry, Mike Lee, and Marco Rubio. Reeves placed third in the Republican primary with 20.1% of the vote to Yesli Vega and Derrick Anderson.

=== 2026 U.S. Senate campaign ===
In September 2025, Reeves announced his candidacy for the 2026 United States Senate election in Virginia. However, on December 28, 2025, Reeves announced that he would be withdrawing his candidacy due to a "serious family health matter."

== Personal life ==
Reeves lives in Orange County, Virginia, with his dogs Ozzy and Gator and volunteers in the community as a mentor, football and lacrosse coach, Christian deacon and missionary. Him and his brother, Blain, were the first in their family to graduate from college. He was a cadet at Texas A&M, recognized as the Distinguished Military Graduate before being commissioned as an officer in the United States Army. After the Army, Bryce served as a narcotics detective in Prince William County, Virginia.

== Electoral history ==
Date	Election	Candidate	Party	Votes	%
Senate of Virginia, 17th District
Nov 8, 2011	General	Bryce E. Reeves	Republican	22,615	50.16
Nov 8, 2011	General	Robert Edward "Edd" Houck	Democratic	22,389	49.66
Nov 8, 2011	General	Write Ins		76	0.16
Nov. 3, 2015	General	Bryce E. Reeves	Republican	24,519	62.09
Nov. 3, 2015	General	Ned Gallaway	Democratic	14,915	37.77
Nov. 3, 2015	General	Write Ins		53	0.14

2017 Virginia lieutenant gubernatorial Republican primary results
Party	Candidate	Votes	%
Republican	Jill Vogel	151,984	42.78%
Republican	Bryce Reeves	142,196	40.03%
Republican	Glenn Davis	61,072	17.19%
Total votes		355,252	100.00%

Virginia General Election, 2019: Virginia's 17th Senate district
Party	Candidate	Votes	%
Republican	Bryce Reeves	34,494	51.6
Democratic	Amy Laufer	32,176	48.1
Total votes		66,879	100
Republican hold		Swing	10.5%

Virginia General Election, 2023: Virginia's 28th Senate district
Party	Candidate	Votes	%	±%
Republican	Bryce Reeves	44,737	62.52	
Democratic	Jason Ford	24,412	34.11	
Independent	Elizabeth Melson	2,305	3.22	
