= Virginia's 28th Senate district =

American legislative district

Virginia's 28th State Senate district
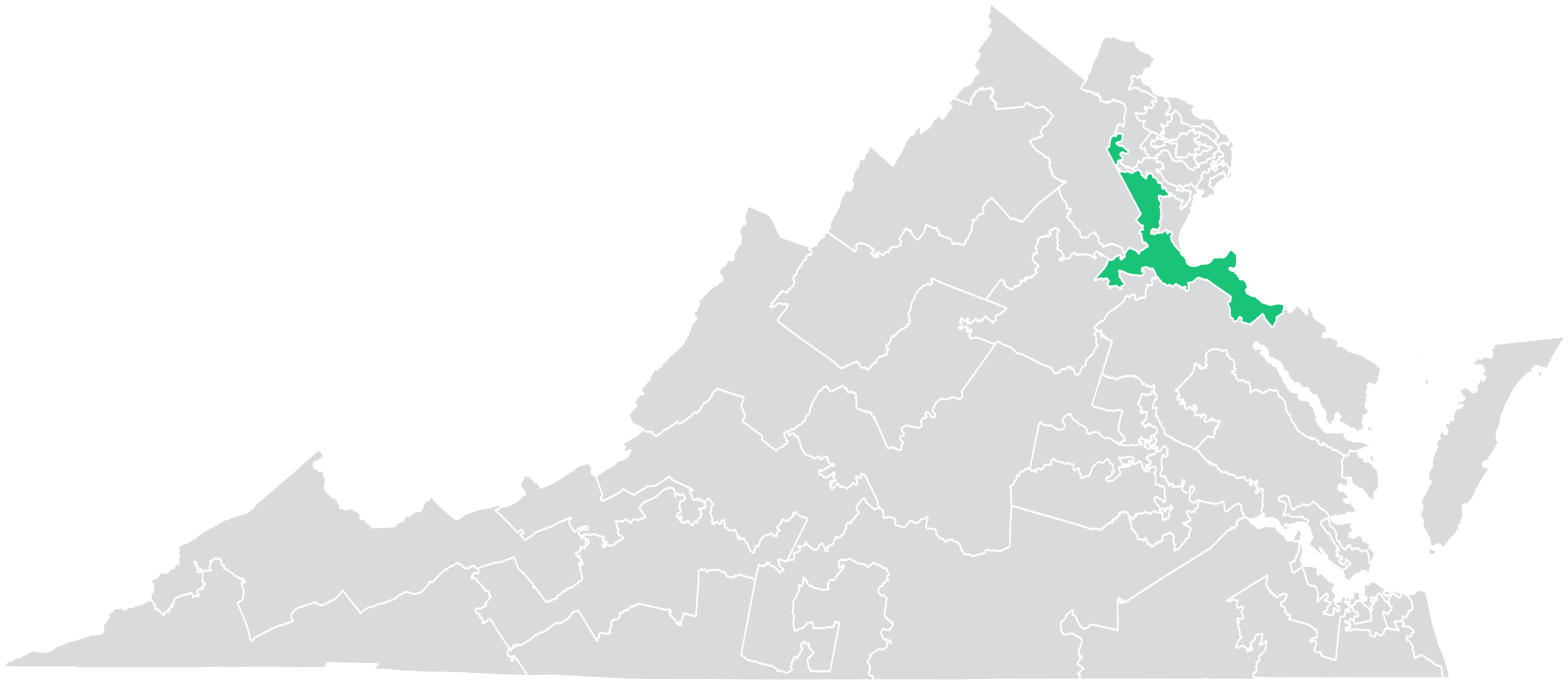
Senator
Bryce Reeves; R–Locust Grove, Orange County
- Demographics: 66% White; 14% Black; 11% Hispanic; 4% Asian; 4% Other
- Population (2019): 226,190
- Registered voters: 164,625

Virginia's 28th Senate district is one of 40 districts in the Senate of Virginia. It has been represented by Republican Bryce Reeves since 2024, when he was redistricted from the 17th district.

== Geography ==
District 28 is located in north-central Virginia. The district is part of the Piedmont and Blue Ridge Mountains regions of Virginia, including the counties of Culpeper, Greene, Madison, Orange, Rappahannock, and portions of Fauquier and Spotsylvania.

The district overlaps with Virginia's 7th and 10th congressional districts, and with the 61st, 62nd, 63rd, and 66th districts of the Virginia House of Delegates.

== Recent election results ==
=== 2019 ===
2019 Virginia Senate election, District 28
Primary election
Party	Candidate	Votes	%
Democratic	Qasim Rashid	3,302	59.1
Democratic	Laura Sellers	2,256	40.4
Total votes		5,583	100
General election
Republican	Richard Stuart (incumbent)	40,193	57.5
Democratic	Qasim Rashid	29,696	42.5
Total votes		69,949	100
Republican hold			

=== 2015 ===
2015 Virginia Senate election, District 28
Party	Candidate	Votes	%
Republican	Richard Stuart (incumbent)	30,187	95.4
Total votes		31,633	100
Republican hold			

=== 2011 ===
2011 Virginia Senate election, District 28
Party	Candidate	Votes	%
Republican	Richard Stuart (incumbent)	26,662	95.3
Total votes		27,965	100
Republican hold			

=== Federal and statewide results ===
Year	Office	Results
2020	President	Trump 50.0–47.8%
2017	Governor	Gillespie 54.2–44.6%
2016	President	Trump 54.2–40.5%
2014	Senate	Gillespie 59.7–38.1%
2013	Governor	Cuccinelli 56.3–38.8%
2012	President	Romney 55.9–42.8%
2012	Senate	Allen 55.7–44.3%

== Historical results ==
All election results below took place prior to 2011 redistricting, and thus were under different district lines.

=== 2007 ===
2007 Virginia Senate election, District 28
Party	Candidate	Votes	%
Republican	Richard Stuart	21,496	50.6
Democratic	Albert C. Pollard	20,896	49.2
Total votes		42,466	100
Republican hold			

=== 2003 ===
2003 Virginia Senate election, District 28
Primary election
Party	Candidate	Votes	%
Republican	John Chichester (incumbent)	11,165	70.5
Republican	Mike Rothfeld	4,668	29.5
Total votes		15,833	100
General election
Republican	John Chichester (incumbent)	23,251	98.0
Total votes		23,729	100
Republican hold			

=== 1999 ===
1999 Virginia Senate election, District 28
Party	Candidate	Votes	%
Republican	John Chichester (incumbent)	29,548	99.0
Total votes		29,858	100
Republican hold			

=== 1995 ===
1995 Virginia Senate election, District 28
Party	Candidate	Votes	%
Republican	John Chichester (incumbent)	28,612	99.9
Total votes		28,632	100
Republican hold			

=== 1991 ===
1991 Virginia Senate election, District 28
Party	Candidate	Votes	%
Republican	John Chichester (incumbent)	20,739	69.5
Democratic	Edwin King	9,109	30.5
Total votes		29,849	100
Republican hold			

=== 1987 ===
1987 Virginia Senate election, District 28
Party	Candidate	Votes	%
Republican	John Chichester (incumbent)	24,747	68.3
Democratic	Ann Riley Smith	11,468	31.7
Total votes		36,218	100
Republican hold			
