= 2011 Virginia Senate election =

- November 8, 2011

All 40 seats in the Senate of Virginia 21 (Note: A majority of 20 is also possible as the Lt. Gov. of Virginia holds a tie-breaker vote.) seats needed for a majority
- Turnout: 1,398,172
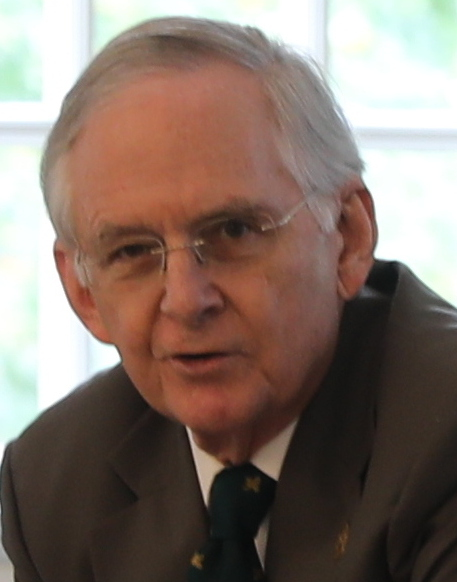

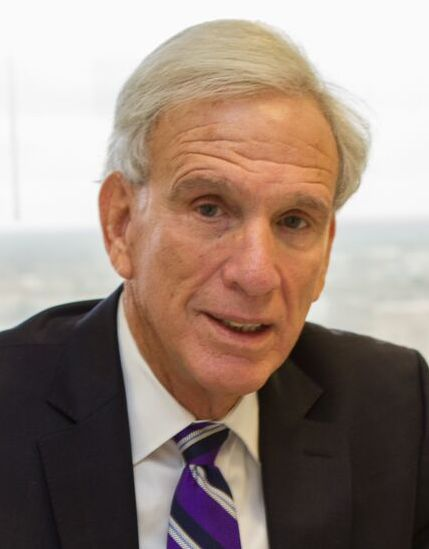
	Majority party	Minority party
Leader	Tommy Norment	Dick Saslaw
Party	Republican	Democratic
Leader since	January 9, 2008	January 10, 1996
Leader's seat	3rd district	35th district
Last election	19	21
Seats before	18	22
Seats won	20	20
Seat change	▲2	▼2
Popular vote	768,914	535,703
Percentage	55%	38.3%
- Results: Democratic hold Republican hold Republican gain
Majority leader before election
Dick Saslaw
Democratic
Elected Majority leader
Tommy Norment
Republican

Prior to the election, Democrats held 22 seats, and Republicans held 18 seats. Redistricting caused the 13th district to be moved from Hampton Roads to Northern Virginia and the 22nd district to be moved from the Roanoke area to a district stretching from Lynchburg to Richmond. Republicans gained two seats, making the Senate tied with 20 Democrats and 20 Republicans. This allowed Republicans to reclaim a majority, as the Republican Lieutenant Governor broke the tie. However, from January 28 to June 12, 2014, Democrats held a majority as they won the Lieutenant Governorship in the 2013 elections, but then later lost a seat in a special election, thereby giving Republicans a 21-19 majority.

Four incumbent senators chose to retire: Fred Quayle (R-13), Patsy Ticer (D-30), Mary Margaret Whipple (D-31), and William Wampler Jr. (R-40). In addition, two senators, Ralph K. Smith (R-22) and Bill Stanley (R-19) chose to seek re-election in new districts: Smith went from the 22nd to Stanley's 19th, while Stanley opted to challenge incumbent Democrat Roscoe Reynolds in the 20th.

== Results ==
=== Predictions ===
Source	Ranking	As of
Ballotpedia	Lean R (flip)	October 31, 2011

=== Results ===
Note: Only races with more than one candidate running are listed below. Unofficial results from the State Board of Elections website.

Party abbreviations: D - Democratic Party, R - Republican Party, IG - Independent Green Party, I - Independent.

District	Incumbent	Party	Elected	Status	2011 Result
1st	John Miller	Democratic	2007	Reelected	John Miller (D) 51.7% Mickey Chohany (R) 48.1%
2nd	Mamie Locke	Democratic	2003	Reelected	Mamie Locke (D) 65.4% Thomas Harmon IV (R) 34.4%
6th	Ralph Northam	Democratic	2007	Reelected	Ralph Northam (D) 56.6% Ben Loyola (R) 43.3%
10th	John Watkins	Republican	1998	Reelected	John Watkins (R) 56.6% David Bernard (D) 43.2%
13th	Fred Quayle	Republican	1991	Retired (District eliminated); Republican hold	Dick Black (R) 57.0% Shawn Mitchell (D) 42.8%
16th	Henry L. Marsh	Democratic	1991	Reelected	Henry L. Marsh (D) 69.0% Preston Brown (I) 30.5%
17th	Edd Houck	Democratic	1983	Defeated	Bryce Reeves (R) 50.2% Edd Houck (D) 49.7%
19th	Bill Stanley	Republican	2010	Elected in 20th District; Republican hold	Ralph K. Smith (R) 56.5% J. Brandon Bell (I) 43.2%
20th	Roscoe Reynolds	Democratic	1996	Defeated	Bill Stanley (R) 46.8% Roscoe Reynolds (D) 45.5% Jeff Evans (I) 7.6%
21st	John Edwards	Democratic	1995	Reelected	John Edwards (D) 55.9% Dave Nutter (R) 44.0%
22nd	Ralph K. Smith	Republican	2007	Elected in 19th District (District eliminated); Republican hold	Thomas Garrett, Jr. (R) 58.1% Bert Dodson (D) 41.8%
23rd	Steve Newman	Republican	1995	Reelected	Steve Newman (R) 77.8% Robert Short (D) 21.9%
25th	Creigh Deeds	Democratic	2001	Reelected	Creigh Deeds (D) 64.4% T.J. Aldous (R) 35.5%
27th	Jill Holtzman Vogel	Republican	2007	Reelected	Jill Holtzman Vogel (R) 74.6% Shaun Broy (D) 23.2% Donald Marro (I) 2.1%
29th	Chuck Colgan	Democratic	1975	Reelected	Chuck Colgan (D) 55.0% Tom Gordy (R) 44.8%
30th	Patsy Ticer	Democratic	1995	Retired; Democratic hold	Adam Ebbin (D) 64.4% Tim McGhee (R) 35.4%
31st	Mary Margaret Whipple	Democratic	1995	Retired; Democratic hold	Barbara Favola (D) 58.1% Caren Merrick (R) 41.7%
32nd	Janet Howell	Democratic	1991	Reelected	Janet Howell (D) 60.3% Patrick Forrest (R) 39.7%
33rd	Mark Herring	Democratic	2007	Reelected	Mark Herring (D) 54.1% Patricia Phillips (R) 45.8%
34th	Chap Petersen	Democratic	2007	Reelected	Chap Petersen (D) 59.7% Gerarda Cullipher (R) 40.2%
35th	Dick Saslaw	Democratic	1980	Reelected	Dick Saslaw (D) 61.7% Robert Sarvis (R) 36.0% Katherine Pettigrew (IG) 2.3%
36th	Toddy Puller	Democratic	2000	Reelected	Toddy Puller (D) 55.4% Jeff Frederick (R) 44.4%
37th	Dave Marsden	Democratic	2010	Reelected	Dave Marsden (D) 53.8% Jason Flanary (R) 46.2%
38th	Phillip Puckett	Democratic	1998	Reelected	Phillip Puckett (D) 53.0% Adam Light (R) 46.9%
39th	George Barker	Democratic	2007	Reelected	George Barker (D) 53.1% Miller Baker (R) 46.8%
40th	William Wampler Jr.	Republican	1988	Retired; Republican hold	Bill Carrico (R) 66.9% John Lamie (D) 33.0%
