= Roanoke City Council =

The Roanoke City Council is the governing body of the city of Roanoke, Virginia. Currently, the council has six members, all elected in an at-large manner, and a mayor elected in an individual election.

The City Council’s duties are primarily legislative. It also oversees financial decisions the city pursues. City Council directs the affairs of Roanoke by passing ordinances or adopting resolutions. Roanoke uses a weak-mayor political system in which the mayor is simply the "first of equals" on the City Council.

== Current Council ==
=== Current City Council Members ===
- Joe Cobb (D) – Mayor
- Terry McGuire (D) – Vice-Mayor
- Peter J. Volosin (D)
- Vivian Sanchez-Jones (D)
- Phazhon T. Nash (D)
- Evelyn Powers (I)
- Nicolas "Nick" Hagen (R)

Roanoke City Council Elections, 2024
| Party | Candidate | Votes | % | ±% |
|---|---|---|---|---|
| Democratic | S. Terry McGuire | 18,110 | 19.00% | − |
| Democratic | Phazhon T. Nash | 17,737 | 18.61% | − |
| Republican | Nicolas S. "Nick" Hagen | 14,990 | 15.73% | − |
| Independent | Evelyn W. Powers | 13,732 | 14.41% | − |
| Republican | James R. "Jim" Garrett | 12,470 | 13.09% | − |
| Democratic | I. Benjamin Woods | 11,752 | 12.33% | − |
| Independent | Cathy M. Reynolds | 5,856 | 6.15% | − |
| Write-in | 644 | 0.68% | | |

==== May 2018 Election ====
Roanoke City Council Elections, 2018
| Party | Candidate | Votes | % | ±% |
|---|---|---|---|---|
| Democratic | Joseph L. "Joe" Cobb | 5,113 | 22.40% | − |
| Democratic | Djuna Osborne | 5,004 | 21.92% | − |
| Independent | William D. "Bill" Bespitch (Incumbent) | 3,924 | 17.15% | − |
| Democratic | Robert L. Jeffrey, Jr. | 3,590 | 15.73% | |
| Independent | Raphael E. "Ray" Ferris (Incumbent) | 2,452 | 14.93% | |
| Independent | Grover C. Price III | 1,041 | 4.56% | |
| Independent | Shawn M. Hunter | 535 | 2.34% | |
| No party | Write-ins | 218 | 0.95% | − |
| Democratic gain from Independent | | Swing | +1 | |

== See also ==
- Roanoke, Virginia
- List of mayors of Roanoke, Virginia
- Local government in the United States
