= W. Onico Barker =

American politician (1934–2023)

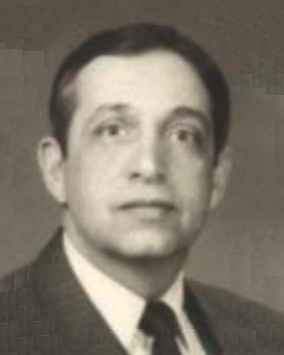
- Barker in 1988

Member of the Virginia Senate from the 19th district
- In office January 9, 1980 – January 8, 1992
- Preceded by: Coleman Yeatts
- Succeeded by: Charles R. Hawkins

Personal details
- Born: William Onico Barker; November 6, 1934 Reidsville, North Carolina, U.S.
- Died: March 25, 2023 (aged 88) Dallas, Texas, U.S.
- Party: Republican
- Spouse: Lucy Mae Lovell (m. 1962)
- Education: Virginia Tech (BS)

Military service
- Allegiance: United States
- Branch/service: United States Army
- Years of service: 1957–1960

William Onico Barker (November 6, 1934 – March 25, 2023) was an American politician who served as a member of the Virginia Senate from 1980 to 1992. He ran for the Republican nomination to succeed Dan Daniel in Congress in 1988 but lost to Reagan White House aide Linda Arey.

Barker died in Dallas, Texas on March 25, 2023, at the age of 88.
