= Noel Taylor =

Noel Taylor may refer to:

- Noel Taylor (costume designer) (1917–2010), American costume designer
- Noel Taylor (athlete), former New Zealand long-distance runner
- Noel Taylor (footballer) (born 1943), Australian rules footballer
- Noel C. Taylor (1924–1999), mayor of Roanoke, Virginia
