= Yeatts =

Yeatts is a surname. Notable people with the surname include:

- Coleman Yeatts (1908–1993), American attorney and politician
- William Walter Murray Yeatts (died 1948), British Raj census commissioner
