= Janet Howell =

American politician (1944–2026)

- Howell in 2019

Member of the Virginia Senate from the 32nd district
- In office January 8, 1992 – January 10, 2024
- Preceded by: Clive L. DuVal II
- Succeeded by: Suhas Subramanyam

Personal details
- Born: Janet Evans Denison; May 7, 1944 Washington, D.C., U.S.
- Died: August 2, 2026 (aged 82) Reston, Virginia, U.S.
- Party: Democratic
- Spouse: Hunt Howell (m. 1966)
- Parent(s): Edward Fulton Denison; Elsie Lightbown
- Education: Oberlin College (B.A.); University of Pennsylvania, (M.A.)
- Committees: Finance and Appropriations (Chair); Education and Health; Local Government; Privileges and Elections; Rules

Janet Evans Denison Howell (May 7, 1944 – August 2, 2026) was an American politician. A member of the Democratic Party, she represented the 32nd district in portions of Fairfax County and Arlington County in the Virginia Senate from 1992 to 2024.

== Early life and education ==
Janet Evans Denison was born in Washington, D.C., on May 7, 1944. She was born to Edward Fulton Denison and Elsie Lightbown Denison. Her mother worked at the Women's Bureau and was a civic activist in Montgomery County, and her father was a prominent economist at the US Department of Commerce and the Brookings Institution. Howell was molested at age 6, which influenced her decision to introduce a 1998 piece of legislation that created an online sex offender registry. She obtained a B.A. in government from Oberlin College in 1966 and a M.A. in international relations from the University of Pennsylvania in 1988.

== Career ==
Prior to her political career, Howell worked as a public school teacher and legislative assistant for Kenneth R. Plum in the Virginia House of Delegates. She was chair of the Fairfax County Social Services Board from 1979 to 1982, member of the Virginia State Board of Social Services from 1986 to 1991, member of the Reston Transportation Committee from 1986 to 1991, and president of the Reston Community Association from 1982 to 1985.

Howell was elected in the 1991 election to the Virginia Senate to represent the 32nd district, following Clive L. DuVal II's retirement. In 1998, Howell introduced a statewide version of Megan's Law. The law created an online sex offender registry for Virginia residents. She sponsored legislation to require electronic toll payer E-ZPass to be compatible with Smart Tag. In 1997, Howell joined the Senate Finance and Appropriations Committee, the first woman to do so. In 2003, Howell sponsored legislation requiring clergy to become mandated reporters of child abuse and neglect.

Following the Virginia Tech shooting, she wrote multiple bills to expand mental health policy. She also led reforms to family violence laws. Howell was chair of the Privileges and Elections committee in 2010. In 2010, Howell led the process to draw new Senate district boundaries to reflect the 2010 US census, as chair of the committee on Privileges and Elections. The redrawn map drew accusations of gerrymandering from Republican politicians. In response to a 2012 bill that required women seeking an abortion to undergo ultrasound imaging, Howell introduced a protest amendment requiring men to undergo a rectal exam and cardiac stress test before obtaining a prescription for erectile dysfunction drugs. In 2015, Howell introduced legislation to repeal the ban on same-sex marriage from the Virginia constitution.

She became chair of the Finance and Appropriations committee in 2019, the first woman to do so. Howell and her daughter-in-law Theresa Howell co-wrote Leading the Way: Women in Power, a book about historic female political and governmental figures aimed at middle schoolers, in 2019. The book's foreword was penned by Hillary Clinton. In 2020, Howell sponsored legislation to expand mail-in voting and ballot drop boxes amidst the COVID-19 pandemic. In 2022, she spearheaded legislation to allow absentee voting without requiring an excuse.

Howell declined to seek re-election in the 2023 election after redistricting in 2021 placed her in the same district as Jennifer Boysko. She retired from the Senate on January 10, 2024. ARLnow described Howell as "a Democrat with moderate leanings and a willingness to work across the aisle when necessary."

== Personal life and death ==
Howell lived in Reston, Virginia. She married Hunt Howell, her college sweetheart, in 1966; the couple had two children.

In 2019, Howell suffered a shattered ankle during a hike in the Adirondack Mountains. She underwent quadruple bypass surgery after blood tests during her recovery revealed that she had previously experienced a silent heart attack.

Howell died in Reston, Virginia on August 2, 2026, at the age of 82.

== Electoral history ==
=== Summary ===
Virginia Senate, District 32: Results 1991 to 2019
Year	Democrat	Votes	%	Republican	Votes	%	Third party	Party	Votes	%
1991	Janet Howell	21,597	52.5%	Frederick Ted T. Dykes	19,519	47.4%	Write-ins		51	0.1%
1995	Janet Howell	26,470	57.3%	Robert M. McDowell	19,738	42.7%	Write-ins		12	0.0%
1999	Janet Howell	25,966	58.2%	Whitney Adams	18,615	41.7%	Write-ins		28	0.1%
2003	Janet Howell	21,252	56.7%	David M. Hunt	16,214	43.3%	Write-ins		13	0.0%
2007	Janet Howell	28,089	97.2%	no candidate			Write-ins		818	2.8%
2011	Janet Howell	26,026	60.3%	Patrick Forrest	17,122	39.6%	Write-ins		48	0.1%
2015	Janet Howell	31,156	94.0%	no candidate			Write-ins		1,974	6.0%
2019	Janet Howell	48,581	73.5%	Arthur Purves	17,376	26.3%	Write-ins		127	0.2%

Senate of Virginia
Preceded by Clive L. DuVal II	Member of the Virginia Senate from the 32nd district 1992–2024	Succeeded by Suhas Subramanyam
