= David Thornton =

David Thornton may refer to:

- David Howard Thornton (born 1979), American actor
- David Thornton (musician) (born 1978), British euphonium player
- David Thornton (actor) (born 1953), American actor
- David Thornton (American football) (born 1978), linebacker for the Tennessee Titans
- David F. Thornton (1924–2008), member of the Senate of Virginia
