= Lincoln Tech =

American for-profit vocational schools

Coordinates: 40.795263°N 74.259240°W

- Type: for-profit postsecondary vocational institutions
- Established: 1946
- President: Scott M. Shaw
- Location: Parsippany, New Jersey, United States
- Website: lincolntech.edu

Lincoln Tech is an American group of for-profit postsecondary vocational institutions headquartered in Parsippany, New Jersey with campuses in Colorado, Connecticut, Georgia, Illinois, Indiana, Maryland, New Jersey, New York, Pennsylvania, Rhode Island, Tennessee, and Texas. Each campus is owned and operated by Lincoln Educational Services Corporation (Nasdaq: LINC), a provider of career-oriented post-secondary education.

Lincoln Tech operates schools under three names or brands: Lincoln Technical Institute, Lincoln College of Technology and Nashville Auto-Diesel College.

== History ==
Lincoln Technical Institute was established in 1946 in Newark, New Jersey. The school's founder and first president, J. Warren Davies -- a decorated Army Captain and entrepreneur -- wanted to serve World War II veterans returning from overseas. At Lincoln, these veterans found training programs to help them learn career-specific skills, and transition into civilian careers in diesel engine repair and installation and servicing of air conditioning and heating system (HVAC) equipment.

In 1969, Ryder acquired Lincoln Technical Institute and two other technical schools with campuses in Illinois, Pennsylvania, and New Jersey. In 1975, Lincoln Technical re-incorporated and acquired the locations sold to Ryder as well as six other campuses.

As part of a campaign event in 1992, then President George H. W. Bush spoke at the Lincoln Tech campus in Union, NJ. He was joined by Secretary of Labor Lynn Martin. During the speech he expressed a commitment to job training.

In 2003, Lincoln Educational Services acquired Nashville Auto-Diesel College. The school, located in Nashville, TN on 16 acres of land, was founded in 1919 by H.O. Balls and, at the time of acquisition, had graduated more than 44,000 technicians from around the world.

In 2004, Lincoln Tech began diversifying its program offerings with the purchase of New England Technical Institute, which operated a culinary school in Connecticut.

Lincoln Educational Services Corporation made its initial public stock offering in 2005, trading on the NASDAQ under the symbol LINC.

In 2004 and 2005, Lincoln Tech would continue expanding its footprint in education by acquiring additional schools and bringing the Lincoln Tech mission to new markets. Included in the acquisitions were Southern College of Business, Computer-Ed Business Institute, and Denver Automotive and Diesel College. In December 2005, Lincoln Tech acquired Euphoria Institute of Beauty Arts and Sciences, which marked the school's entry into the salon and spa educational vertical. Twenty years later, Lincoln Tech would sell the school to IntelliTec College.

In October 2009, Lincoln Tech announced the acquisition of Briarwood College in Southington, CT. Lincoln Tech further expanded in 2009 with the addition of five more schools: Baran Institute of Technology, Connecticut Culinary Institute, Americare School of Nursing, Engine City Technical Institute, and Clements College.

=== Lawsuits and investigations ===
In 2013, USA Today, based on data from 2009 to 2010, called one of the company's 31 campuses a "Red Flag school", one which has "a higher loan default rate than graduation rate."

In October 2014, Massachusetts state attorney general Martha Coakley announced an investigation into Lincoln's for-profit schools in the state of Massachusetts. The following year, Lincoln Educational Services agreed to repay approximately $1 million to graduates of its criminal justice program in Somerville and Lowell, Massachusetts. The Massachusetts' Attorney General found that students were unable to find work in their fields of study, and the company included unrelated jobs in its placement data. According to the Boston Globe, "The school also allegedly told recruiters to 'establish unhappiness, create urgency,' and 'bring out the pain' to pressure prospective students to attend the school instead of military or community college. The for-profit school instructed recruiters to contact students at least seven times within the first three days to convince them to enroll."

In 2022, Lincoln Educational Services was one of 153 institutions included in student loan cancellation due to alleged fraud. The class action was brought by a group of more than 200,000 student borrowers, assisted by the Project on Predatory Student Lending, part of the Legal Services Center of Harvard Law School. A settlement was approved in August 2022, stating that the schools on the list were included "substantial misconduct by the listed schools, whether credibly alleged or in some instances proven." Lincoln Educational Services challenged the settlement. The Supreme Court rejected the challenge in April 2023.

== Locations ==
Lincoln Tech has campuses in twelve states:

- Colorado: Denver
- Connecticut: New Britain, Shelton, East Windsor
- Georgia: East Point, Marietta
- Illinois: Melrose Park
- Indiana: Indianapolis
- Maryland: Columbia
- New Jersey: Iselin, Mahwah, Moorestown, Paramus, South Plainfield, Union
- New York: Queens, Brooklyn (Admissions Office Only)
- Pennsylvania: Allentown, Levittown
- Rhode Island: Lincoln
- Tennessee: Nashville (Nashville Auto-Diesel College)
- Texas: Grand Prairie, Houston

== Academics ==
Lincoln Tech offers certificate and associate degree programs in Automotive, Skilled Trades, Health Sciences, and Information Technology. It is institutionally accredited by the Accrediting Commission of Career School and Colleges (ACCSC), which is recognized by the United States Department of Education. Lincoln Tech also maintains several industry accreditations, including:

- National Center for Construction Education & Research
- ASE Education Foundation
- Esco Institute's HVAC Excellence
- AED Foundation

=== Student services ===
Lincoln Tech provides several services to students and graduates as part of their education and career journey, including:

- Financial Aid: Lincoln Tech's Financial Aid Department works with students to create a financial plan for their education. This can include assisting with student loans, scholarships, and a variety of other financial aid programs. Lincoln Tech students are eligible to receive Federal Student Aid.
- Academic Support: Lincoln Tech's Educational Department provides additional academic support outside of the classroom including a Learning Resources Center, Student Advising, and tutoring.
- Career Services: Lincoln Tech's Career Services Department assists students and graduates with resume writing, interview skills, and job search strategies. Career Days or Career Fairs are also held regularly where local companies are invited to campus to engage students and graduates.

=== Awards ===
In 2025, USA Today named Lincoln Tech's Melrose Park and South Plainfield campuses as part of America's Top Vocational Schools. This list evaluated schools based on key criteria including graduation rates and graduate salaries.

== Notable alumni ==
Lincoln Tech has graduated more than a quarter of a million graduates since its founding. Notable alumni include

- Patrick Gelsinger, former Intel CEO
- Doyle Heffley, politician
- Chris Rado, professional race car driver
- Ralph K. Smith, politician
