= Malfourd W. Trumbo =

American politician (born 1954)

Bo Trumbo

Circuit Judge of the Twenty-fifth Virginia Circuit
- In office February 1, 2004 – January 31, 2018
- Appointed by: Virginia General Assembly
- Preceded by: Duncan Byrd, Jr.
- Succeeded by: Joel Branscom

Member of the Virginia Senate from the 22nd district
- In office January 8, 1992 – January 14, 2004
- Preceded by: Buzz Emick
- Succeeded by: Brandon Bell

Member of the Virginia House of Delegates from the 18th district
- In office January 10, 1990 – January 8, 1992
- Preceded by: Bill Wilson
- Succeeded by: Creigh Deeds

Personal details
- Born: Malfourd Whitney Trumbo; November 18, 1954 (age 71) Staunton, Virginia, U.S.
- Party: Republican
- Education: College of William & Mary

Malfourd Whitney "Bo" Trumbo (born November 18, 1954) was a Circuit Court judge in the 25th circuit of Virginia, which includes the counties of Botetourt, Craig, Rockbridge, Alleghany, Bath and Highland, and the cities of Lexington, Buena Vista and Covington. A Fincastle lawyer, Trumbo was appointed to replace Judge Duncan Byrd Jr., who died in a 2004 traffic accident in Bath County. Trumbo's appointment was for eight years. He previously served a term in the Virginia House of Delegates and three terms in the State Senate as a Republican. He graduated from the College of William and Mary (A.B., J.D.).
