= William T. Wilson =

American lawyer and politician (born 1937)

Bill Wilson
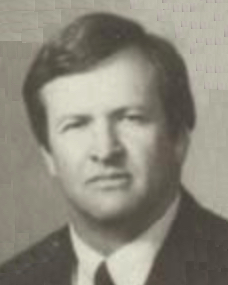

Member of the Virginia House of Delegates
- In office January 9, 1974 – January 10, 1990
- Preceded by: Buzz Emick
- Succeeded by: Bo Trumbo
- Constituency: 10th district (1974‍–‍1982); 8th district (1982‍–‍1983); 18th district (1983‍–‍1990)

Personal details
- Born: William Thomas Wilson; November 30, 1937 (age 88) Crewe, Virginia, U.S.
- Party: Democratic
- Spouse: Langhorne Clarke
- Education: Hampden–Sydney College; University of Virginia
- Occupation: Lawyer; politician

William Thomas Wilson (born November 30, 1937) is an American lawyer and politician who served from 1974 to 1990 in the Virginia House of Delegates. He was defeated for reelection in 1989 by Republican Bo Trumbo.
