= Salona (McLean, Virginia) =

Historic house in Virginia, United States

- U.S. National Register of Historic Places
- Virginia Landmarks Register
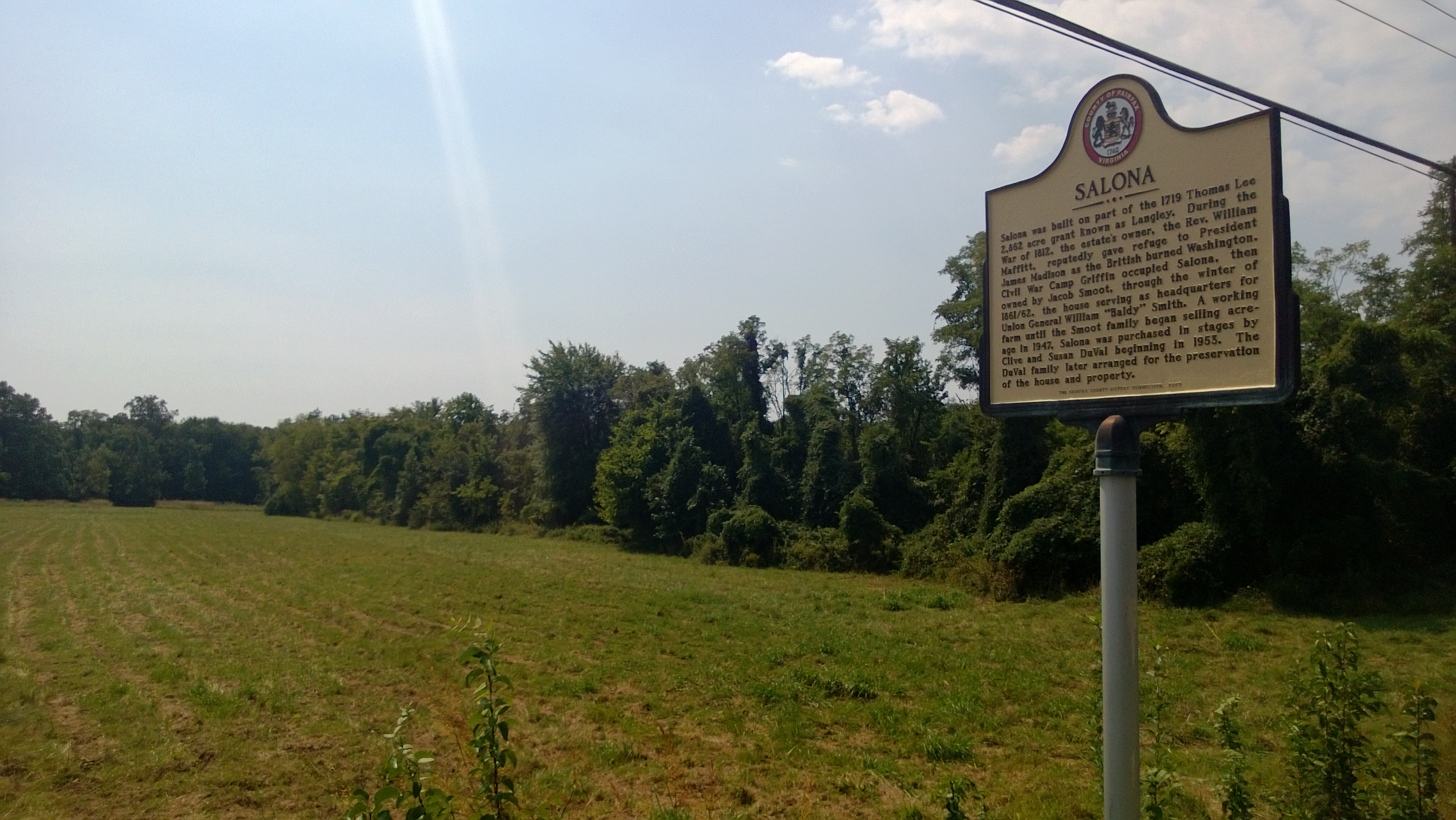
- Salona field from the frontage on Dolley Madison Boulevard

- Location within Northern Virginia Location within Virginia Location within the United States
- Location: 1214 Buchanan Street, McLean, Virginia
- Coordinates: 38°56′18″N 77°10′9″W
- Built: 1812
- Architectural style: Federal
- NRHP reference No.: 73002011
- VLR No.: 029-0034

Significant dates
- Added to NRHP: July 24, 1973
- Designated VLR: June 19, 1973

Salona, in McLean, Virginia, is a former plantation house on the National Register of Historic Places surrounded by land protected by two conservation easements. The Salona homestead and grounds comprise 7.8 acres (3.2 ha) within the 52.4-acre (21.2 ha) site, and are protected by a 1971 easement held by the Fairfax Board of Supervisors. A much newer conservation easement held by the Northern Virginia Conservation Trust added an additional 41 acres (17 ha), of which 10 acres (4.0 ha) will be placed in active recreational use, and the rest used for passive recreation, such as trails.

== History ==
Salona derives its name from a homestead occupied by 1805. The stately brick manor house, currently undergoing renovation, was constructed between 1790 and 1810. The property was owned by Richard Bland Lee (1761-1827), a planter who also served in the Virginia House of Delegates and the U.S. House of Representatives. He is less known than his elder brothers Henry "Light Horse Harry" Lee (1756–1818) and Charles Lee (1758–1815). Although Richard Bland Lee was too young to serve in the Revolutionary War, his eldest brother Light Horse Harry Lee became a cavalry officer (hence the nickname) and rose to the rank of Major General, then served as governor of Virginia (1791) and two terms in Congress, but experienced financial reverses in the Panic of 1796–1797 and was incapacitated in his final years as a result of an 1812 beating suffered as he defended a friend from a Baltimore mob. Today Light Horse Harry Lee may be best known either for his funeral oration for President George Washington on December 26, 1799 (calling his former Commander as "first in war, first in peace, and first in the hearts of his countrymen"), or as the father of Robert E. Lee, who commanded the Confederate States Army during the American Civil War. His other brother Charles Lee served as Attorney General of the United States in both the Washington and John Adams administrations (1795-1801).

In 1812, Richard Bland Lee donated the property to Reverend William Maffitt, who in 1803 had married the widow Henrietta Lee, and who gave the property its name meaning "just hospitality".

President James Madison fled to Salona in August 1814 as the federal government evacuated and British forces burned the new federal city, including the White House. First Lady Dolley Madison fled separately and rejoined her husband at Salona. Route 123 (fronting the property) is also locally called "Dolley Madison Boulevard" because of that event.

During the Civil War, the Union Army established Camp Griffin on the site (owned since 1853 by Jacob Smoot and for decades afterward by his heirs) and surrounding properties from October 1861 until March 1862. The mansion house became headquarters for General George B. McClellan and other Union commanders.

In modern times, Clive L. DuVal II and his wife purchased it in 1951, and made it their home as well as preserved it and secured its placement on the National Register for Historic Places. DuVal served multiple terms in both houses of the Virginia General Assembly and his descendants retain the approximately 3 acres (1.2 ha) remaining of the 52.4-acre (21.2 ha) site.

== Conservation efforts ==
The conservation easement preserves one of the last sizeable open spaces in McLean. Within the new easement, 10 acres (40,000 m^{2}) will be placed in active recreational use with the remainder used for passive recreation such as trails (providing a critical link to the Pimmit Run Trail system). The easement also allows for preservation and interpretation of natural and cultural resources on the property. It prevents any residential construction on the property in perpetuity, and the Park Authority has the right of first refusal to own the Salona property outright. The cost of the conservation easement ($16.1 million) is less than half of the appraised (highest and best use) value of the property. The Northern Virginia Conservation Trust assumes easement enforcement duties, and collaborated in the easement acquisition process.
