= Coleman Yeatts =

American attorney & politician (1908–1993)

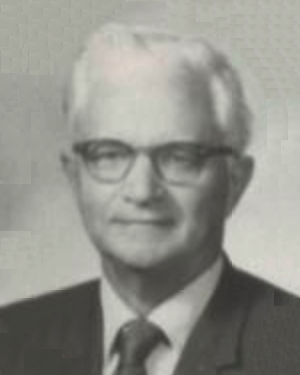

Member of the Virginia Senate from the 19th district
- In office January 12, 1972 – January 9, 1980
- Preceded by: H. Dunlop Dawbarn
- Succeeded by: W. Onico Barker

Member of the Virginia House of Delegates from Pittsylvania County
- In office January 8, 1936 – January 10, 1940 Serving with Charles J. Ashworth
- Preceded by: Hubert D. Bennett
- Succeeded by: William C. Clark

Personal details
- Born: Coleman Bennett Yeatts; October 31, 1908 Dry Fork, Virginia, U.S.
- Died: November 22, 1993 (aged 85) Danville, Virginia, U.S.
- Party: Democratic
- Spouse: Grace Ruth Cook (m. 1940)
- Education: University of Virginia (LLB)
- Occupation: Lawyer; politician

Military service
- Branch/service: United States Army; Army Ground Forces
- Years of service: 1944–1946
- Battles/wars: World War II; European theater

Coleman Bennett Yeatts Sr. (October 31, 1908 – November 22, 1993) was an American lawyer and politician, who served as a member of the Virginia House of Delegates and Virginia Senate. Upon his election to the House in 1935, he was the youngest member of that body. More than 30 years after leaving the House, he sought election to the Senate, where he served until his defeat in 1979.
