= Rich Anderson (Virginia politician) =

American politician (born 1955)

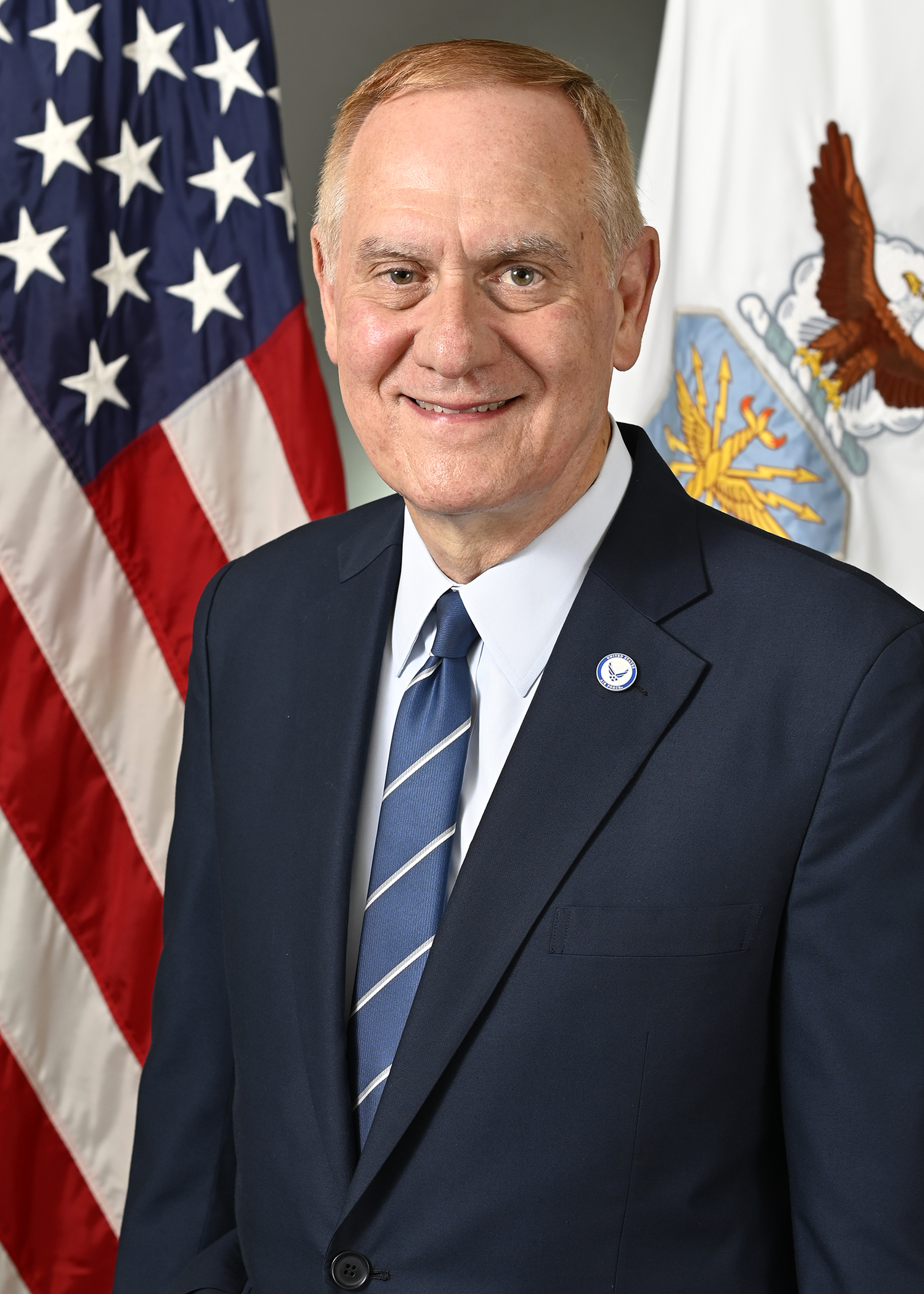
- Official portrait, 2026

Assistant Secretary of the Air Force for Manpower and Reserve Affairs
- Incumbent
- Assumed office September 22, 2025
- President: Donald Trump
- Preceded by: Alex Wagner

Chair of the Virginia Republican Party
- In office August 15, 2020 – April 12, 2025
- Preceded by: Jack Wilson
- Succeeded by: Mark Peake

Member of the Virginia House of Delegates from the 51st district
- In office January 13, 2010 – January 10, 2018
- Preceded by: Paul F. Nichols
- Succeeded by: Hala Ayala

20th National Commander of the Civil Air Patrol
- In office August 14, 1993 – August 10, 1996
- President: Bill Clinton
- Preceded by: Warren Barry
- Succeeded by: Paul Bergman

Personal details
- Born: May 30, 1955 (age 71) Roanoke, Virginia, U.S.
- Party: Republican
- Spouse: Ruth Valentine
- Education: Virginia Tech (BA); Webster University (MPA)

Military service
- Branch: United States Air Force
- Service years: 1979–2009
- Rank: Colonel (USAF); Brigadier General (CAP)
- Unit: Civil Air Patrol

Richard L. Anderson (born May 30, 1955) is an American politician, retired air force officer, and former Civil Air Patrol general who served as its 20th national commander from 1993 to 1996. A member of the Republican Party, he served in the Virginia House of Delegates from 2010 to 2018 and was chair of the Republican Party of Virginia from 2020 to 2025. Since 2025, he has served as Assistant Secretary of the Air Force for Manpower and Reserve Affairs under President Donald Trump.

Anderson chaired the House Committee on Science and Technology (2010–2017), and served on the House committees on Finance (2010–2017), General Laws (2010–2017), and Transportation (2012–2017).

== Early life and career ==
Anderson was born in Roanoke, Virginia, and attended Northside High School there. He received a B.A. degree in political science from Virginia Tech in 1979.

Anderson was commissioned in the United States Air Force after graduation, serving as a nuclear missile operations officer in Titan II and Minuteman II intercontinental ballistic missile units, as well as other command and staff positions. He received an M.A. in public administration from Webster University in 1982. He also attended the Air War College, Air Command and Staff College and Armed Forces Staff College. He retired in 2009 in the rank of colonel. His wife, the former Ruth Valentine, also served in the U.S. Air Force for 21 years.

Anderson joined the Civil Air Patrol (CAP) as a cadet in 1969, and has been a CAP member since then. He progressed through the cadet program, becoming the 200th recipient of the General Carl A. Spaatz Award and promoting to the grade Cadet Colonel. He served as National Commander with the CAP rank of brigadier general August 1993 – August 1996, and was chairman of the CAP Board of Governors February 2011 – February 2013.

== Political career ==
After his U.S. Air Force retirement, Anderson entered politics, gaining the Republican nomination for the Virginia House of Delegates 51st district in the 2009 election. He defeated first-term Democrat Paul F. Nichols by less than two percentage points. Anderson ran unopposed in 2011, and defeated Democrat Reed Heddleston by roughly 2,000 votes in 2013. In 2015, Anderson ran unopposed for re-election to his fourth term in office. His district was based in Prince William County.

Anderson was chairman of the Virginia House Committee on Science and Technology. He was defeated for re-election in the 2017 Virginia House of Delegates election.

In 2020, Anderson was elected to a four-year term as Chairman of the Virginia Republican Party.

In March 2025, Anderson was nominated by President Donald Trump to become an Assistant Secretary of the Air Force. He announced in a letter that he would step down as Chairman of the Virginia Republican Party once he was confirmed by the Senate.

== Electoral history ==
After his U.S. Air Force retirement, Anderson entered politics, gaining the Republican nomination for the Virginia House of Delegates 51st district in the 2009 election. He defeated first-term Democrat Paul F. Nichols by less than two percentage points.

Date	Election	Candidate	Party	Votes	%
Virginia House of Delegates, 51st district
Nov 3, 2009	General	Richard L. Anderson	Republican	7,940	50.78
Nov 3, 2009	General	Paul F. Nichols	Democratic	7,671	49.06
Nov 3, 2009	General	Write Ins		25	0.16
Nov 3, 2009	General	Incumbent lost; seat switched from Democratic to Republican			
Nov 8, 2011	General	Richard L. Anderson	Republican	11,296	95.5
Nov 8, 2011	General	Write Ins		533	4.5

Party political offices
Preceded by Jack Wilson	Chair of the Virginia Republican Party; 2020–2025	Succeeded by Mark Peake
