= Mark Peake =

American politician from Virginia

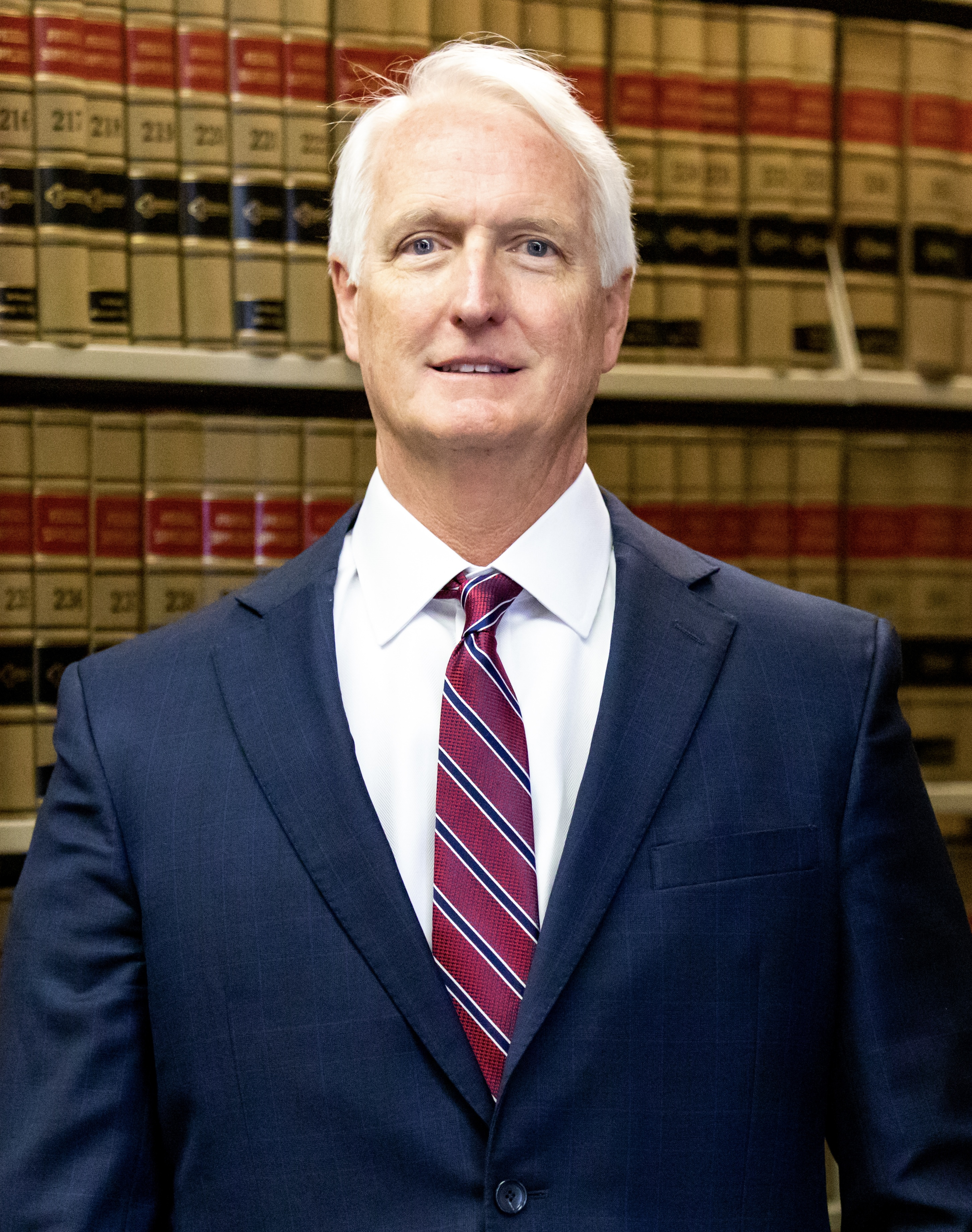

Chair of the Virginia Republican Party
- In office April 12, 2025 – December 31, 2025
- Preceded by: Rich Anderson
- Succeeded by: Kristi Way (acting)

Member of the Virginia Senate
- Incumbent
- Assumed office January 13, 2017
- Preceded by: Tom Garrett
- Constituency: 22nd district (2017–2024); 8th district (2024–present)

Personal details
- Born: Mark Joseph Peake; January 19, 1963 (age 63) Greensboro, North Carolina, U.S.
- Party: Republican
- Spouse: Lila Gober
- Education: Virginia Tech (BA); Washington and Lee University (JD)

Mark Joseph Peake (born January 19, 1963) is a member of the Virginia Senate, representing the 22nd district. A member of the Republican Party, he won a special election held on January 10, 2017, to succeed Tom Garrett Jr., who had been elected to the United States House of Representatives.

On April 12, 2025, Peake was elected as the new chair of the Republican Party of Virginia after the incumbent chair, Rich Anderson, was nominated to serve as Assistant Secretary of the Air Force for Manpower and Reserve Affairs. However, in December of that year, Peake announced that in the aftermath of the 2025 Virginia elections, an election widely seen as a large win for Virginia Democrats, he was stepping down from the role, effective December 31.

Senator Peake grew up in Roanoke and has been married to his wife, Lila, since 1995. They have five children. Senator Peake graduated from Virginia Tech and Washington and Lee Law School and has practiced law in Lynchburg for over thirty years.

== Electoral history ==
Date	Election	Candidate	Party	Votes	%
Virginia Senate, 22nd district
January 10, 2017	Special	Mark J. Peake	Republican	13,713	53.06
January 10, 2017	Special	Ryant L. Washington	Democratic	10,226	39.57
January 10, 2017	Special	Joseph C. Hines	Independent	1,884	7.29
January 10, 2017	Special	Write Ins		19	0.07
January 10, 2017	Special	Tom Garrett Jr. resigned after being elected to Congress; seat stayed Republican			

Party political offices
Preceded by Rich Anderson	Chair of the Virginia Republican Party; 2025	Succeeded by Kristi Way; Acting
