= Roy L. Webber =

American politician

33rd & 40th Mayor of Roanoke, Virginia
- In office September 1, 1968 – October 18, 1975
- Preceded by: Benton O. Dillard
- Succeeded by: Noel C. Taylor
- In office September 1, 1949 – August 31, 1954
- Preceded by: Williams P. Hunter
- Succeeded by: Robert W. Woody

Personal details
- Born: Roy L. Webber; November 7, 1904
- Died: October 1975 (aged 70)

Roy L. Webber (November 7, 1904–October 1975) served twice as the mayor of the U.S. city of Roanoke, Virginia. He was mayor from 1949 to 1954 and from 1968 to 1975.

Webber was a florist and the business he established in Roanoke carried his name until its closure in 2008. U.S. Route 220 from the end of Interstate 581 at State Route 24 (Elm Avenue) through the road's interchange with State Route 419 was named the Roy L. Webber Expressway in his honor.

Webber appeared in a scene in the 1972 Elvis Presley documentary film Elvis On Tour, greeting Presley on board his private jet upon arrival in Roanoke on April 11, 1972. At the meeting Webber also presented Presley with the key to Roanoke and a guitar shaped bouquet of flowers made especially for the occasion by his own company.

Preceded by Williams P. Hunter	Roanoke, Virginia Mayor; 1949-1954	Succeeded by Robert W. Woody
Preceded by Benton Dillard	Roanoke, Virginia Mayor; 1968-1975	Succeeded by Noel C. Taylor
