= Joe Cobb (mayor) =

American politician

Mayor of Roanoke, Virginia
- Incumbent
- Assumed office January 1, 2025
- Preceded by: Sherman Lea

Personal details
- Born: Joseph L. Cobb; 1961 or 1962 (age 63–64) Kansas City, Missouri, U.S.
- Party: Democratic
- Spouse: James Matthews
- Children: 4
- Education: Southern Methodist University
- Website: Mayoral Campaign Website

Joseph L. Cobb is an American politician and former pastor serving as mayor of Roanoke, Virginia since 2025. He previously served as the city's vice mayor.

== Early life and career ==
Cobb was born in Kansas City, Missouri. He was raised in Wichita, Kansas, one of four adopted children. Cobb initially planned to double major in accounting and music at Southwestern College, but decided to become a pastor instead after attending an annual United Methodist Church meeting. He subsequently changed his coursework, interned at local churches and graduated a year early to attend Southern Methodist University (SMU) in Dallas. Cobb worked as a Methodist minister in Kansas before relinquishing his credentials after coming out as gay.

Cobb moved to Roanoke, Virginia in 2001. He served as the Roanoke Symphony Orchestra's marketing director before becoming the executive director of a homeless shelter. From 2009 to 2017, Cobb served as a pastor at the Metropolitan Community Church.

== Political career ==
Cobb was first elected to the Roanoke City Council in 2018, receiving the most votes of any candidate. He served as vice mayor of the city from 2018 to 2020 and again from 2023 to 2025. He also serves as president of the Greater Roanoke Transit Company.

Cobb won the 2024 mayoral election by just 59 votes ahead of Republican candidate and former mayor David A. Bowers.

== Personal life ==
Cobb married fellow SMU alumni Leigh Anne Taylor in 1985 and they had two children. In 1997, Cobb revealed to Taylor that, a year earlier, he had an encounter with a man at a National Singles Ministry meeting, as stated in their book Our Family Outing: A Memoir of Coming Out and Coming Through published in 2011. The couple later divorced, and Cobb subsequently married James Matthews, with whom he has two children.
