= David A. Bowers =

American politician (born 1952)

42nd & 45th Mayor of Roanoke, Virginia
- In office July 1, 2008 – June 30, 2016
- Preceded by: Nelson Harris
- Succeeded by: Sherman Lea
- In office July 1, 1992 – June 30, 2000
- Preceded by: Noel C. Taylor
- Succeeded by: Ralph K. Smith

Personal details
- Born: David Allen Bowers; May 11, 1952 (age 74) Cortland, New York, U.S.
- Party: Democratic (Until 2020) Republican
- Other political affiliations: Independent (2008, 2020)
- Spouse: Margarita Cubas (m. 2013)
- Education: Belmont Abbey College (B.A.); Loyola University (J.D.); Hollins University (M.A.)

David Allen Bowers (born May 11, 1952) is an American politician who served as mayor of Roanoke, Virginia, for a first term from 1992 to 2000 and then for a second term from 2008 to 2016.

== Biography ==
Bowers previously served as mayor of the city from 1992 to 2000. A Democrat, he was elected mayor after serving on the city council. Bowers is a lawyer who has continued to serve in private practice both during and after his term as mayor.

He was also the unsuccessful Democratic nominee for Virginia's 6th District congressional seat in 1998, losing to incumbent Republican Bob Goodlatte.

Bowers attempted a comeback in the May 2, 2006, election for city council, but he finished in fifth place out of ten candidates in the race for three seats. Bowers ran for mayor of Roanoke as an Independent against the incumbent, Democrat Nelson Harris, Independent George A. Sgouros, and Independent Anita Powell, in the May 2008 municipal election. Bowers won the election with 53% of the vote. In May 2012 Bowers gained a consecutive term as mayor by defeating Republican Mark Lucas 52% percent to 48%.

Bowers ran for mayor in 2020 against Democratic incumbent Sherman Lea, Sr. Though an independent, Bowers was endorsed by Roanoke Republican Party and appeared at a pro-police event that was also attended by Republican representative Ben Cline and Senate nominee Daniel Gade. Bowers criticized Lea and the city council for being insufficiently supportive of the police and fire department as well as of Bower personally in reference to a speaker at a city council meeting that called Bower a white supremacist and received no pushback from council members. Bowers also called the city council and mayor unelected in reference to the fact that elections had been delayed six months due to the COVID-19 pandemic. Bowers lost the election by six percentage points.

Bowers ran for Mayor again in 2024 as the Republican nominee. Bowers lost the election to Democrat Joe Cobb by 59 votes.

== Controversy ==
In November 2015, Bowers spoke out against the resettlement of Syrian refugees in Roanoke, citing as positive precedent the internment of Japanese Americans during World War II, two-thirds of whom were American citizens, an event for which the American government formally apologized and provided reparations as part of the Civil Liberties Act of 1988. Bowers' comment prompted a social media backlash and calls for his resignation.

Preceded by Noel C. Taylor	Roanoke, Virginia Mayor; 1992-2000	Succeeded by Ralph K. Smith
Preceded by Nelson Harris	Roanoke, Virginia Mayor; 2008-2016	Succeeded by Sherman Lea
