= David Suetterlein =

American politician from Virginia

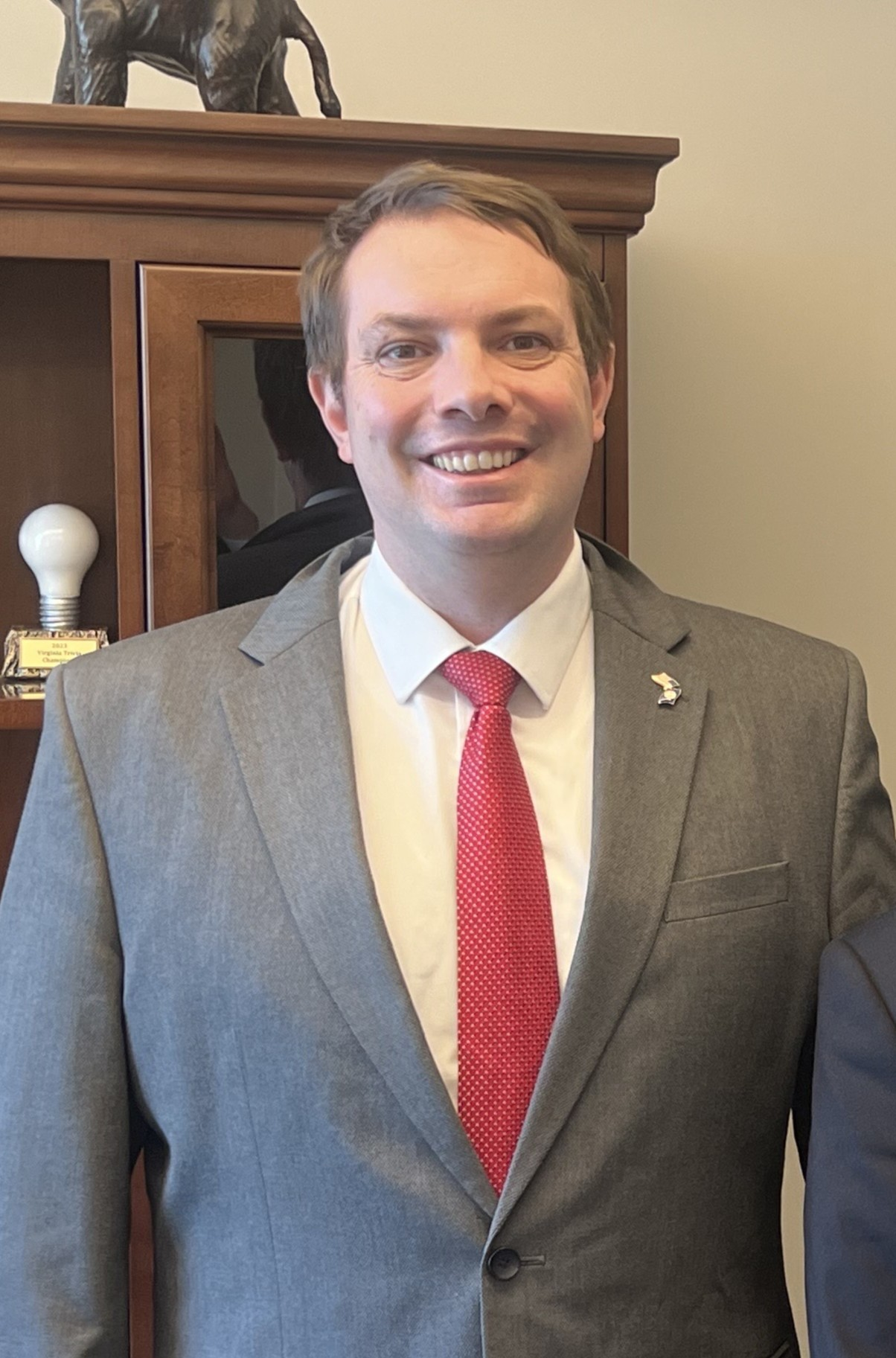
- Suetterlein in 2025

Member of the Virginia Senate
- Incumbent
- Assumed office January 13, 2016
- Preceded by: Ralph Smith (19th district)
- Succeeded by: Christie Craig (19th district)
- Constituency: 19th District (2016–2024); 4th District (since 2024)
- Preceded by: Ryan McDougle (4th district)

Personal details
- Born: David Robert Suetterlein; January 4, 1985 (age 41)
- Party: Republican
- Spouse: Ashley
- Education: Grove City College (B.A.)
- Committees: Agriculture, Conservation and Natural Resources; Education and Health; Transportation
- Website: www.suetterlein.com

David Robert Suetterlein (born January 4, 1985) is an American politician, currently serving as a Republican member of the Senate of Virginia. He previously worked on the campaign and senate staff of Ken Cuccinelli and on the senate staff of his predecessor, Ralph K. Smith. Suetterlein was first elected in 2015, defeating Democrat Michael Hamlar and Independent Steven Nelson. He has been re-elected in 2019 and 2023.

== Electoral history ==
Date	Election	Candidate	Party	Votes	%
Virginia Senate, 19th district
Nov 3, 2015	General	David R. Suetterlein	Republican	33,120	64.95
Nov 3, 2015	General	Michael L. Hamlar	Democratic	15,738	30.82
Nov 3, 2015	General	Steven L. Nelson	Independent	2,134	4.18
Nov 3, 2015	General	Write Ins		70	0.14
Nov 3, 2015	General	Ralph Smith did not seek reelection; seat stayed Republican			

Date	Election	Candidate	Party	Votes	%
Virginia Senate, 19th district
Nov 5, 2019	General	David R. Suetterlein	Republican	41,290	71.4
Nov 5, 2019	General	Flourette Marie Moore Ketner	Democratic	16,484	28.5
Nov 5, 2019	General	All Others		50	0.1

Date	Election	Candidate	Party	Votes	%
Virginia Senate, 4th district
Nov 7, 2023	General	David R. Suetterlein	Republican	32,127	53.2
Nov 7, 2023	General	Trish White-Boyd	Democratic	28,109	46.6
Nov 7, 2023	General	All Others		126	0.2

Senate of Virginia
Preceded by Ralph Smith	Member of the Virginia Senate from the 19th district 2016–2024	Succeeded by Christie Craig
Preceded by Ryan McDougle	Member of the Virginia Senate from the 4th district 2024–Present	Incumbent
