= Sherman Lea =

American politician

Sherman P. Lea Sr

46th Mayor of Roanoke, Virginia
- In office July 1, 2016 – December 31, 2024
- Preceded by: David A. Bowers
- Succeeded by: Joe Cobb

Personal details
- Born: 1952 or 1953 Danville, Virginia
- Party: Democratic
- Education: Virginia Union University

Sherman P. Lea Sr (born 1952 or 1953) is an American politician and community leader who served as the 46th mayor of Roanoke, Virginia, from July 1, 2016, to December 31, 2024. A longtime civic leader and advocate for youth, equity, and justice, Lea was one of the most prominent Black political figures in southwestern Virginia over the past two decades. He served on the Roanoke City School Board, the City Council, and the Virginia Parole Board over a 20-year public service career.

== Biography ==
Born in Danville, Virginia, around 1953, Lea was raised in a working-class family and developed a strong sense of service and leadership early in life. He attended Virginia Union University, a historically Black university in Richmond, where he played center for the Panthers football team and helped lead them to a CIAA Championship in 1973. He earned a bachelor’s degree in sociology and later pursued graduate work in urban studies at Old Dominion University.

Lea’s public service in Roanoke began with five years on the Roanoke City School Board, including one year as chairman. He was elected to the Roanoke City Council in 2004 and served multiple terms, including as Vice-Mayor from 2008 to 2010. In July 2016, he became the 46th Mayor of Roanoke, defeating incumbent David Bowers. Lea was reelected in 2020 and served until the end of 2024, choosing not to run for a third term.

During his two terms as mayor, Lea presided over a period of sustained reinvestment and modernization in Roanoke. His administration championed long-range planning initiatives including City Plan 2040, Parks and Recreation Master Plan, and the Neighborhood Centers Plan. He helped usher in the return of Amtrak service, the redevelopment of downtown commercial spaces, and investments in youth sports, community policing, and gun violence prevention.

In 2023, Lea announced he would not seek re-election and stepped down at the end of his term in December 2024.
