= Christie Craig (politician) =

American politician from Virginia

Member of the Virginia Senate from the 19th district
- Incumbent
- Assumed office January 10, 2024
- Preceded by: David Suetterlein (redistricting)

Personal details
- Party: Republican

Christie New Craig is an American Republican politician from Virginia. She was elected to the Virginia Senate in the 2023 Virginia Senate election from the 19th district. Her current term is set to expire in 2028.

== Political career ==
Craig was elected as a member of the Chesapeake City School Board for three consecutive terms, winning a seat in the 2010, 2014, and 2018 elections.

In 2017, she unsuccessfully ran as a candidate in the Republican primary to be the Chesapeake City Commissioner of the Revenue. She received 44.9% of the vote, losing the nomination to Francis Xavier King.

Following redistricting, Craig ran for and won a seat in the Virginia Senate, representing the 19th district.
