= Buzz Emick =

American lawyer and politician (1939–2014)

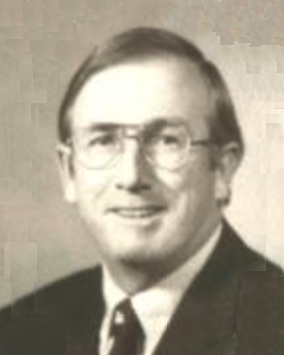
- Official portrait, 1984

Member of the Virginia Senate from the 22nd district
- In office January 14, 1976 – January 8, 1992
- Preceded by: David F. Thornton
- Succeeded by: Bo Trumbo

Member of the Virginia House of Delegates from the 10th district
- In office January 12, 1972 – January 9, 1974
- Preceded by: George Kostel
- Succeeded by: Bill Wilson

Personal details
- Born: Dudley Joseph Emick Jr. September 17, 1939 Bartley, West Virginia, U.S.
- Died: October 25, 2014 (aged 75) Daleville, Virginia, U.S.
- Party: Democratic
- Spouse: Martha Elliott
- Education: Virginia Tech (BS); University of Richmond (LLB)
- Occupation: Lawyer; politician

Military service
- Branch/service: United States Army
- Years of service: 1961–1963
- Rank: Captain

Dudley Joseph "Buzz" Emick Jr. (September 17, 1939 – October 25, 2014) was an American lawyer and politician who served as a member of the Virginia Senate and House of Delegates.
