= Clive L. DuVal II =

American politician (1912–2002)

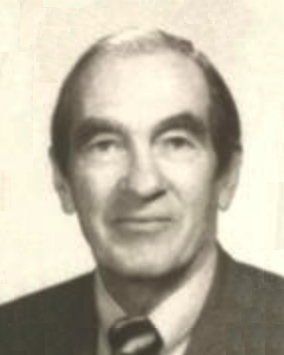

Member of the Virginia Senate from the 32nd district
- In office January 12, 1972 – January 8, 1992
- Preceded by: Robert C. Fitzgerald
- Succeeded by: Janet Howell

Member of the Virginia House of Delegates for Fairfax and Falls Church
- In office January 12, 1966 – January 12, 1972
- Preceded by: John L. Scott
- Succeeded by: Wyatt Durrette

Personal details
- Born: Clive Livingston Du Val II; June 20, 1912 New York, New York, U.S.
- Died: February 25, 2002 (aged 89) McLean, Virginia, U.S.
- Party: Republican (until 1964); Democratic (1964–2002)
- Spouse: Susan Bontecou
- Education: Yale University (BA, LLB)

Military service
- Branch/service: United States Navy
- Years of service: 1942–1946
- Rank: Lieutenant commander
- Battles/wars: World War II; Pacific theater

Clive Livingston Du Val II (June 20, 1912 – February 25, 2002) was an American politician and Virginia lawyer who served five terms in the Senate of Virginia (1972 to 1992) after three terms in the Virginia House of Delegates.

== Early and family life ==
Du Val was born in New York City on June 20, 1912, the son of a Wall Street broker. He attended Groton School and Yale University, Phi Beta Kappa summa cum laude in 1935. He then attended Yale Law School, edited the Yale Law Journal, and received his law degree in 1938.

In 1940, Du Val married artist Susan Holdredge Bontecou (1919–1997), with whom he had a daughter Susan and three sons Clive III, Daniel and David.

== Career ==
During World War II, Du Val served in the U.S. Navy (1942–1946), including in the Pacific Theater aboard the USS Lexington, an aircraft carrier. He rose in rank from Lieutenant Junior Grade to Lieutenant Commander, and also earned five battle stars, a Commendation Medal and Presidential Unit Citation. In 1978 the Disabled American Veterans awarded him its National Commander's award for his subsequent legislative service.

After five more years in private legal practice, Du Val entered his public service during the Republican administration of President Dwight Eisenhower, serving in the U.S. Department of Defense in positions including: Special Assistant to the Undersecretary of the Army (1951-1952), Special Assistant to the Assistant Secretary of the Defense (1953), and Assistant General Counsel (international Affairs) (1953-1955). He then became General Counsel for the U.S. Information Agency (1955-1959). In 1959, Du Val served as Associate General Counsel for the President's Committee to Study the United States Military Assistance Program.

Du Val returned to private practice in 1959, with the Washington D.C. office of the New York law firm Milbank, Tweed, Hadley & McCloy, where he worked in legislative affairs until retiring in 1970. After Democrat John F. Kennedy defeated Republican Presidential candidate Richard M. Nixon in the 1960 Presidential election, Du Val joked that he rebuffed an attempt to purchase his McLean, Virginia home by Attorney General designate Robert F. Kennedy, because he and his wife found Kennedy arrogant. Du Val was a Rockefeller Republican but turned toward the Democratic Party as a result of the (losing) Presidential candidacy of Barry Goldwater in 1964, and because of Du Val's local political involvement concerning development of the Merrywood estate in McLean (the childhood home of Jacqueline Bouvier Kennedy). Du Val became President of the McLean Citizens Association and succeeded in getting the U.S. Department of the Interior to buy a conservation easement and thus block a proposed high rise development along that segment of the Potomac River. He later succeeded in transforming another estate along the Potomac River into the Scott's Run Nature Preserve.

As a Virginia legislator (a part-time position) for nearly three decades, Du Val attributed his success to courtesy, patience and persistence. First elected to the Virginia House of Delegates in 1965 as a Democrat representing Fairfax County, Virginia after the U.S. Supreme Court decision in Davis v. Mann struck down the Byrd Organization reapportionment that had shortchanged Northern Virginia, Du Val was twice re-elected as delegate. However, when he ran for U.S. Congress in 1966 against incumbent conservative Republican Joel Broyhill to represent Virginia's 10th congressional district, he lost. The following year Du Val was one of only two northern Virginia Democratic delegates winning re-electing in what became a Republican landslide after an address by President Richard Nixon (and the collapse of the Byrd Organization).

Du Val helped revise the Virginia Constitution in 1969-1970, and became known as a Virginia gentleman despite his accent. A consumer advocate, DuVal challenged electric and telephone utility rate increases before the State Corporation Commission and Virginia Supreme Court. The National Wildlife Federation twice gave Du Val awards for his clean-river legislation and environmental stewardship, and he was Virginia's member of the Environmental Quality and Natural Resources Committee of the Southern Legislative Conference. He also worked with the Virginia Citizens Consumer Council, Izaak Walton League, Sierra Club, National Trust for Historic Preservation, and with veterans organizations and Chambers of Commerce in his district.

However, Du Val was also unsuccessful in his attempts to secure his party's nomination for U.S. Senate in 1970 and again in 1978. He lost the former to George Rawlings by 700 votes out of 120,000 and became his opponent's treasurer rather than demand a recount, but Rawlings still lost the general election to Harry F. Byrd Jr., who had run as an Independent rather than endorse his one time fellow Democrat as his father's Byrd Organization collapsed. Upon the announced retirement of Republican William L. Scott, DuVal again ran for U.S. Senate, but suffered from his association with fellow Democrat and consumer advocate Henry Howell, who had defeated Andrew P. Miller in the previous gubernatorial primary only to lose badly to Republican Ted Dalton.

Fairfax County voters elected Du Val to the Virginia Senate in 1971, when he defeated incumbent Republican Robert C. Fitzgerald after a redistricting that instituted single member districts (Fairfax previously had two senators and his district number had the previous year been assigned to Roanoke many hours drive to the southwest). Fairfax and north Arlington County voters re-elected Du Val four times before he announced that he would not seek re-election in 1991. Despite traveling to Richmond on a Greyhound bus and staying at an inexpensive motel, Du Val had risen to lead the Democratic Caucus. He served on the powerful Senate Finance Committee, as well as on a less official group of seven legislators who hashed out divergences between bill passed by the two legislative chambers. Du Val came to lead the northern Virginia delegation in the General Assembly after the retirement of Adelard L. Brault, who had questioned his very different style. The Washington Post analogized Brault's to Jimmy Cagney and Du Val's to Jimmy Stewart. In his last campaign, he carpooled to debates with his Republican opponent (and won). In addition to his courtesy and natty attire, Du Val became known for advocating conservation, consumer rights and clean-government legislation. Despite some skeptics who criticized him as "too nice", Du Val also blocked efforts to trim Metrorail funds and led efforts to secure funding for George Mason University and northern Virginia road projects circa 1985.

== Legacy ==
Du Val died of cancer at his historic estate on February 25, 2002. He had survived his wife of 27 years (who also died of cancer) by five years, and had dedicated an art studio at the McLean Community Center (she had served on the McLean Project for the Arts board of directors for 30 years) in her memory on April 29, 2000. Both also outlived one son (who died in 1998). Du Val was survived by two other sons, a daughter, his brother and several grandchildren. His papers are held by George Mason University.

His historic house, Salona (once home to Revolutionary War hero Henry "Light Horse Harry" Lee, and refuge for Dolley Madison when British troops burned the White House in 1814) has been protected by a conservation easement since 1971 and has been on the National Register of Historic Places since 1973.

Senate of Virginia
Preceded by Robert C. Fitzgerald	Virginia Senator for the Fairfax District; 1972–1992	Succeeded by Janet D. Howell
