= Nelson Harris =

American mayor

44th Mayor of Roanoke, Virginia
- In office July 1, 2004 – June 30, 2008
- Preceded by: Ralph K. Smith
- Succeeded by: David A. Bowers

Personal details
- Party: Democratic

Nelson Harris is Baptist minister and a former mayor of Roanoke, Virginia, having served from 2004 to 2008. A Democrat, he was elected mayor in 2004 with 37% of the vote in a competitive four-way race against Republican Alice Hincker, Independent Delvis "Mac" McCadden, and Independent George A. Sgouros. Harris had previously served on the school board and city council.

== Biography ==
Harris holds a Bachelor of Arts degree from Radford University and a Master of Divinity degree from Southeastern Theological Seminary. Harris has done post-graduate work at Princeton Theological Seminary and Harvard University. He teaches religion and philosophy at Virginia Western Community College in Roanoke; and is currently the pastor of Heights Community Church in Roanoke (formerly Virginia Heights Baptist). Harris has also written or compiled several books about the history of Roanoke and the surrounding area. His books include the following titles: Aviation in Roanoke, Downtown Roanoke, Virginia Tech, The Norfolk & Western Railway, Hidden History of Roanoke, Stations and Depots of the Norfolk & Western Railway, Salem and Roanoke County in Vintage Postcards, Roanoke in Vintage Postcards, The Seventeenth Virginia Cavalry, and Greater Raleigh Court: A History of Virginia Heights, Norwich, Raleigh Court and Wasena. Harris has been published in the following periodicals and magazines: The Roanoker, Virginia Southwest, The Student, Log Home Living, Country Collectibles, and Historic Salem.

In 2003, Harris was named a Marshall Memorial Fellow by the German Marshall Fund, allowing for study and travel in Europe. In 2006, Princeton Seminary named him a Pastoral Fellow for his study in pastoral theology. In 2005, Harris was awarded the Outstanding Alumnus Award from Radford University. He later served Radford University as a member of its Board of Visitors from 2006 through 2010, having received a gubernatorial appointment to the board.

In Roanoke's May 2, 2006, municipal elections, Harris and then vice mayor Beverly Fitzpatrick backed a successful slate of three Democrats, running on an independent ticket dubbed "For the City" against the nominees of the Democratic and Republican parties. The election ended the city's long running debate about the fate of Victory Stadium in favor of Harris' preference to replacing it with separate stadiums at Roanoke's two high schools. The local Democratic party considered sanctions against Harris for supporting the independent ticket but differences were smoothed out by 2008. Harris ran for re-election in the May 2008 municipal election but lost to former mayor and fellow Democrat David A. Bowers who ran as an Independent; two other Independents were also in the race: Anita Powell, and George A. Sgouros.

| Preceded by Ralph K. Smith | Roanoke, Virginia Mayor; 2004-2008 | Succeeded by David A. Bowers |
