= Charles R. Hawkins =

American politician (born 1943)

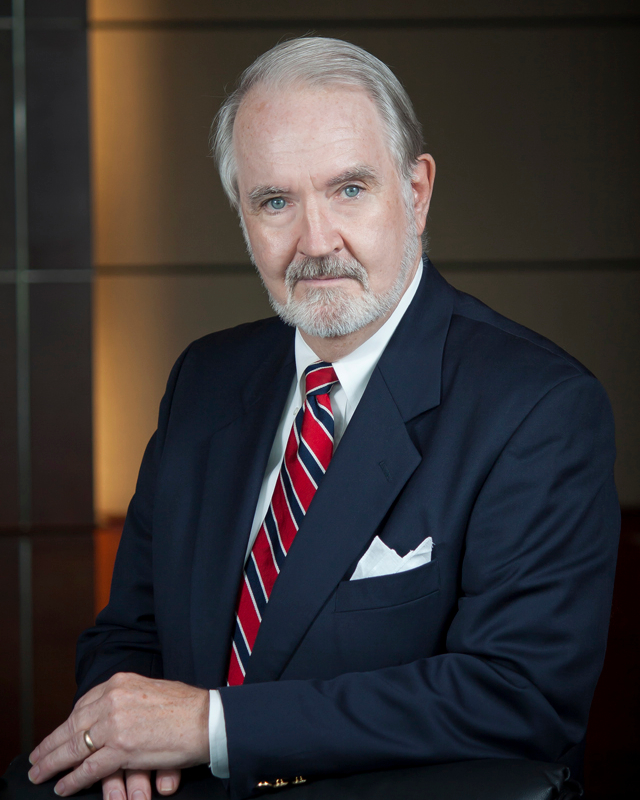

Member of the Virginia Senate from the 19th district
- In office January 8, 1992 – January 9, 2008
- Preceded by: W. Onico Barker
- Succeeded by: Robert Hurt

Member of the Virginia House of Delegates
- In office January 13, 1982 – January 8, 1992
- Preceded by: Claude V. Swanson
- Succeeded by: Frank Wagner (redistricting)
- Constituency: 13th district (1982‍–‍1983); 21st district (1983‍–‍1992)

Personal details
- Born: Charles Robert Hawkins; October 17, 1943 (age 82) Danville, Virginia, U.S.
- Party: Republican
- Education: University of Virginia
- Profession: Haberdasher

Charles Robert Hawkins (born October 17, 1943) is a former American politician. A Republican, he most recently served as Chair of the Virginia Tobacco Commission and was also previously a member of the Virginia Senate from 1992 until 2008. Prior to this, he was a member of the Virginia House of Delegates from the 21st District from 1982 until 1991.
