= Virginia's 20th Senate district =

American legislative district

Virginia's 20th State Senate district
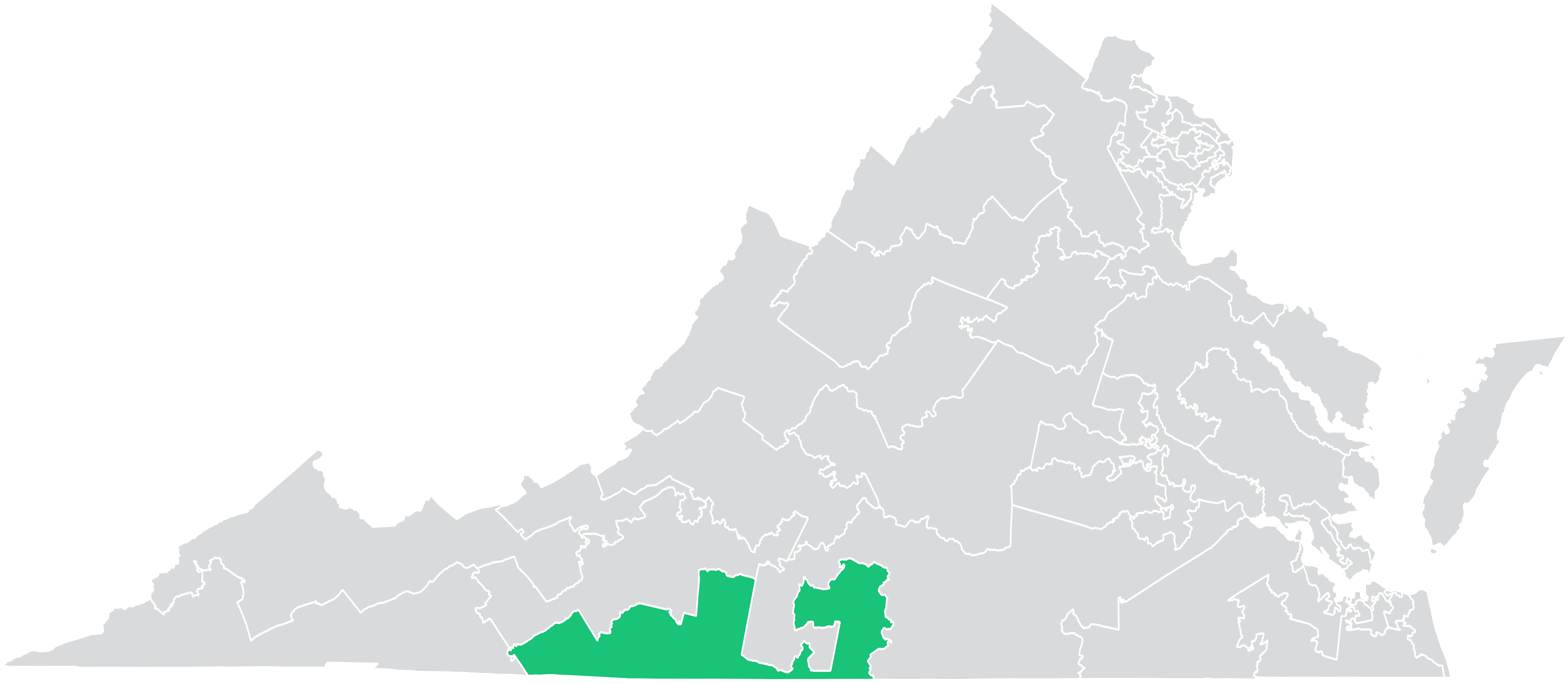
Senator
Bill DeSteph; R–Virginia Beach
- Demographics: 65% White; 27% Black; 5% Hispanic; 1% Asian; 2% Other
- Population (2019): 191,494
- Registered voters: 130,536

Virginia's 20th Senate district is one of 40 districts in the Senate of Virginia. It has been represented by Republican Bill DeSteph since 2024. Prior to 2024 redistricting, DeSteph represented the 8th district. He represented district 8 from 2016 until 2024.

== Geography ==
District 20 is located in eastern Virginia, particularly the Hampton Roads and Eastern Shore regions, including the counties of Accomack and Northampton. The independent cities that are part of District 20 include portions of the City of Norfolk and the City of Virginia Beach.

The district overlaps with Virginia's 2nd and 3rd congressional districts, and with the 94th, 95th, 97th, 99th, and 100th districts of the Virginia House of Delegates.

== Recent election results ==
=== 2019 ===
2019 Virginia Senate election, District 20
Party	Candidate	Votes	%
Republican	Bill Stanley (incumbent)	32,527	70.5
Independent	Sherman Witcher	13,394	29.0
Total votes		46,125	100
Republican hold			

=== 2015 ===
2015 Virginia Senate election, District 20
Party	Candidate	Votes	%
Republican	Bill Stanley (incumbent)	22,701	57.9
Democratic	Kim Adkins	16,455	42.0
Total votes		39,223	100
Republican hold			

=== 2011 ===
2011 Virginia Senate election, District 20
Party	Candidate	Votes	%
Republican	Bill Stanley (incumbent)	23,975	46.8
Democratic	Roscoe Reynolds (incumbent)	23,331	45.5
Independent	Willis Jeffery Evans	3,887	7.6
Total votes		51,230	100
Republican gain from Democratic			

2011 redistricting placed Bill Stanley, the Republican incumbent from the 19th district, in the same district as Democrat Roscoe Reynolds, the incumbent from the 20th district, resulting in an incumbent-vs-incumbent general election.

=== Federal and statewide results ===
Year	Office	Results
2020	President	Trump 57.6–40.6%
2017	Governor	Gillespie 58.5–40.7%
2016	President	Trump 56.8–40.4%
2014	Senate	Gillespie 51.1–47.1%
2013	Governor	Cuccinelli 53.9–39.8%
2012	President	Romney 50.6–47.2%
2012	Senate	Allen 51.6–48.4%

== Historical results ==
All election results below took place prior to 2011 redistricting, and thus were under different district lines.

=== 2007 ===
2007 Virginia Senate election, District 20
Party	Candidate	Votes	%
Democratic	Roscoe Reynolds (incumbent)	30,365	63.0
Republican	Willis Jeffery Evans	17,804	36.9
Total votes		48,229	100
Democratic hold			

=== 2003 ===
2003 Virginia Senate election, District 20
Party	Candidate	Votes	%
Democratic	Roscoe Reynolds (incumbent)	27,699	67.8
Republican	Thomas Peterson	13,134	32.1
Total votes		40,876	100
Democratic hold			

=== 1999 ===
1999 Virginia Senate election, District 20
Party	Candidate	Votes	%
Democratic	Roscoe Reynolds (incumbent)	27,586	99.9
Total votes		27,617	100
Democratic hold			

=== 1996 special ===
1996 Virginia Senate special election, District 20
Party	Candidate	Votes	%
Democratic	Roscoe Reynolds	17,360	58.2
Republican	Allen Dudley	12,438	41.7
Total votes		29,803	100
Democratic hold			

=== 1995 ===
1995 Virginia Senate election, District 20
Party	Candidate	Votes	%
Democratic	Virgil Goode (incumbent)	38,709	100
Total votes		38,728	100
Democratic hold			

Decades earlier, District 20 consisted of Campbell County, Virginia and Lynchburg slightly further north.
