= List of mayors of Roanoke, Virginia =

The following is a list of mayors of Roanoke, Virginia. This list includes the mayors of the former town Big Lick, Virginia, which was later incorporated as the city of Roanoke on February 3, 1882.

Mayors of the town of Big Lick:

No.	Name	Entered office	Left office
1	John Trout	February 28, 1874	June 30, 1876
2	Samuel Griggs	July 1, 1876	June 30, 1878
3	William H. Startzman	July 1, 1878	June 30, 1880
4	Marshall Waid	July 1, 1880	February 3, 1882

Elected mayors following incorporation as the City of Roanoke:

No.	Name	Entered office	Left office
5	Marshall Waid	February 3, 1882	June 30, 1892
6	Lucian H. Cocke	July 1, 1882	June 30, 1884
7	John H. Dunston	July 1, 1884	June 30, 1885
8	Samuel G. Williams	July 1, 1885	June 30, 1886
9	William Carr	July 1, 1886	June 30, 1890
10	William G. Evans	July 1, 1890	June 30, 1892
11	Henry S. Trout	July 1, 1892	June 30, 1894
12	Sturgis E. Jones	July 1, 1894	June 30, 1896
13	Robert McClelland	July 1, 1896	November 2, 1896
14	William K. Andrews	November 2, 1896	June 30, 1898
15	James P. Woods	July 1, 1898	June 30, 1900
16	J. Randolph Bryan	July 1, 1900	February 13, 1902
17	Robert D. Buckner	February 13, 1902	June 30, 1902
18	Joel H. Cutchin	July 1, 1902	April 9, 1912
19	Sylvester P. Seifert	April 9, 1912	June 30, 1912
20	John W. Woods	July 1, 1912	December 23, 1912
21	Cephas B. Moomaw	February 1, 1913	October 18, 1915
22	Charles M. Brown	October 18, 1915	August 31, 1918
23	W.W. Boxley	September 1, 1915	August 31, 1922
24	Blair J. Fishburn	September 1, 1922	August 31, 1926
25	Charles D. Fox	September 1, 1926	August 31, 1930
26	Sylvester P. Seifert	September 1, 1930	August 31, 1934
27	Sidney F. Small	September 1, 1934	June 2, 1938
28	James A. Bear	June 2, 1938	August 31, 1938
29	Walter W. Waid	September 1, 1938	October 15, 1943
30	Leo F. Henebry	October 15, 1943	August 31, 1946
31	Richard T. Edwards	September 1, 1946	August 31, 1948
32	Williams P. Hunter	September 1, 1948	August 31, 1949
33	Roy L. Webber	September 1, 1949	August 31, 1954
34	Robert W. Woody	September 1, 1954	August 31, 1956
35	Walter L. Young	September 1, 1956	August 31, 1958
36	Vincent S. Wheeler	September 1, 1958	August 31, 1960
37	Willis M. Anderson	September 1, 1960	August 31, 1962
38	Murray A. Stoller	September 1, 1962	August 31, 1964
39	Benton O. Dillard	September 1, 1964	August 31, 1968
40	Roy L. Webber	September 1, 1968	October 18, 1975
41	Noel C. Taylor	October 27, 1975	June 30, 1992
42	David A. Bowers	July 1, 1992	June 30, 2000
43	Ralph K. Smith	July 1, 2000	June 30, 2004
44	Nelson Harris	July 1, 2004	June 30, 2008
45	David A. Bowers	July 1, 2008	June 30, 2016
46	Sherman Lea	July 1, 2016	January 1, 2025
47	Joe Cobb	January 1, 2025	
