= David F. Thornton =

American attorney and politician from Virginia (1924–2008)

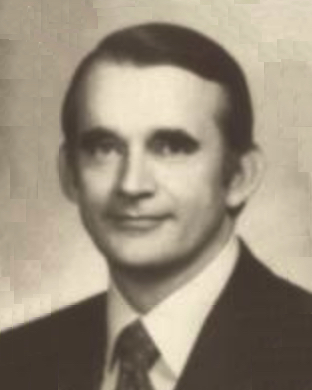
- Official portrait, 1972

Member of the Virginia Senate
- In office June 19, 1970 – January 14, 1976
- Preceded by: H. Clyde Pearson
- Succeeded by: Buzz Emick
- Constituency: 18th district (1970‍–‍1972); 22nd district (1972‍–‍1976)

Personal details
- Born: David Fess Thornton; December 14, 1924 Sistersville, West Virginia, United States
- Died: March 13, 2008 (aged 83) Bedford, Massachusetts, United States
- Party: Republican
- Spouse: Dimity Lippitt
- Education: Roanoke College (BA); Columbia University (MA)

Military service
- Branch/service: United States Army; Army Service Forces
- Years of service: 1943–1946
- Unit: Signal Corps
- Battles/wars: World War II; Asia–Pacific theater

David Fess Thornton (December 14, 1924 – March 13, 2008) was an American attorney and politician who served as a member of the Virginia Senate and House of Delegates. A Republican, he was defeated for reelection by Buzz Emick in 1975.
