= Roscoe Reynolds =

American politician

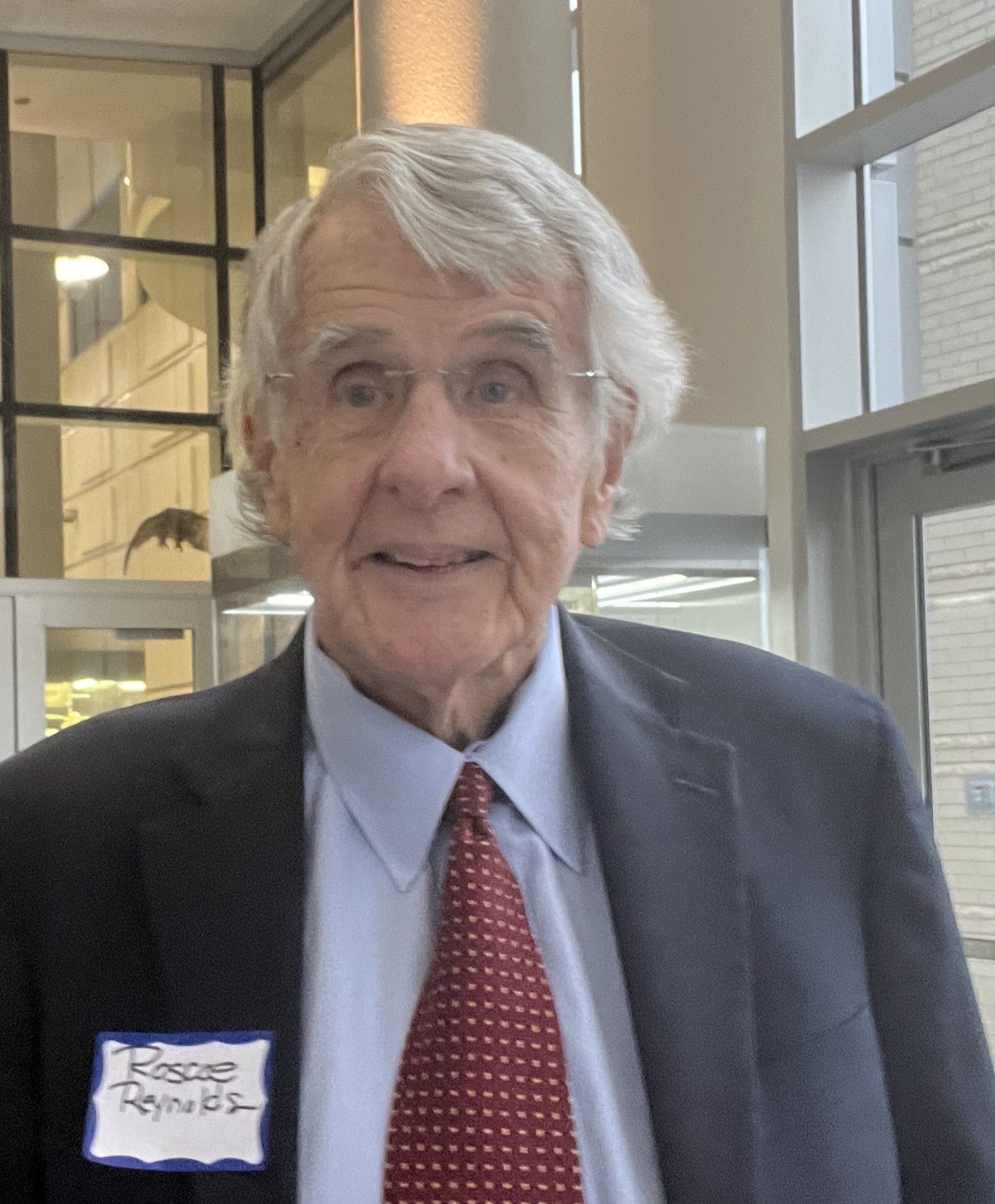
- Reynolds in 2024

Member of the Virginia Senate from the 20th district
- In office January 8, 1997 – January 11, 2012
- Preceded by: Virgil Goode
- Succeeded by: Bill Stanley

Member of the Virginia House of Delegates from the 10th district
- In office January 11, 1986 – December 30, 1996
- Preceded by: Mary Sue Terry
- Succeeded by: Barnie Day

Personal details
- Born: William Roscoe Reynolds; May 21, 1942 (age 84) Martinsville, Virginia, U.S.
- Party: Democratic
- Spouse: Linda Marshall
- Children: 2
- Education: Duke University; Washington & Lee University
- Profession: Lawyer

William Roscoe Reynolds (born May 21, 1942) is an American politician. A Democrat, he served in the Virginia House of Delegates 1986–97 and was elected to the Senate of Virginia in a December 1996 special election. Prior to his election to the House of Delegates, Reynolds served as Commonwealth's Attorney for Henry County, Virginia. He represented the 20th Senate district, made up of four counties and parts of two others in southwestern Virginia, plus the cities of Galax and Martinsville.

== Elections ==
In 2007, Roscoe Reynolds defeated his opponent, Jeff Evans, 62.88% to 37.06%, winning re-election to the Senate of Virginia. After redistricting changed the composition of the 20th Senate district, Reynolds was challenged by William Stanley, the incumbent from the 19th district. In a three-way race, Stanley defeated Reynolds by 644 votes, 46.80% to 45.54%.

== Political positions ==
=== Castle Doctrine ===
- Reynolds has voted multiple times against Castle Doctrine bills.
  - In January 2011, Reynolds voted against Senate Bill 876 (Castle Doctrine) which would have allowed "a lawful occupant use of physical force, including deadly force, against an intruder in his dwelling who has committed an overt act against him, without civil liability."
  - In February 2011, Reynolds was one of eight senators on the Senate Courts of Justice Committee who "passed by indefinitely" House Bill 1573, defeating the bill by an 8 to 4 margin.
