= Bill Stanley (politician) =

American politician from Virginia

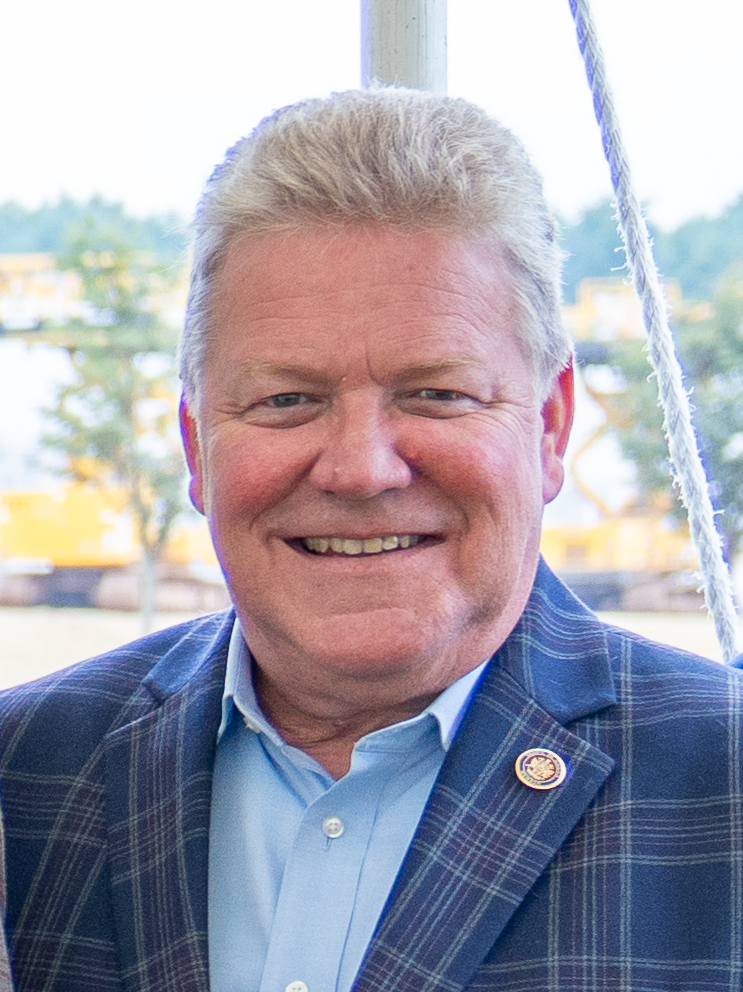
- Stanley in 2025

Member of the Virginia Senate
- Incumbent
- Assumed office January 12, 2011
- Preceded by: Robert Hurt
- Constituency: 19th District (2011–2012); 20th District (2012–2024); 7th District (since 2024)

Personal details
- Born: July 21, 1967 (age 59) Milton, Florida, U.S.
- Party: Republican
- Education: Hampden-Sydney College (BS); University of the District of Columbia (JD)
- Committees: Agriculture, Conservation and Natural Resources; Judiciary; Local Government
- Website: Official website

William M. Stanley Jr. (born July 21, 1967) is an American politician. A Republican, he was elected in 2011 to the Senate of Virginia for the 7th district. The 7th district includes the cities of Galax and Martinsville, Henry and Patrick counties, part of the city of Danville, and parts of five other Southside Virginia counties.

== Early life, education, business career ==
Stanley was born in Milton, Florida, the son of a United States Navy aviator. The family purchased a home Franklin County, Virginia after his father retired in 1983. Stanley received a B.S. degree from Hampden-Sydney College, and a J.D. from the District of Columbia School of Law. He joined the Northern Virginia law firm of Gilbert Davis, where he was involved in Paula Jones' sexual harassment lawsuit against President Bill Clinton. In 1999 he moved back to Franklin County and began to practice law there.

He co-owns a Modified team with former NASCAR driver, professional wrestler and politician Hermie Sadler that competes in the SMART Modified Tour and NASCAR Whelen Modified Tour. In 2024, The team won their first championship in the SMART Modified Tour with Luke Baldwin.

== Political career ==
Stanley was elected Franklin County Republican Committee chair in 2008, and Virginia's 5th Congressional District Republican Committee chair in 2010.

In 2009, Stanley's home in Franklin County was shifted into the neighboring 20th District of incumbent Democrat Roscoe Reynolds. Stanley ran in the 20th and defeated Reynolds, 23975 (46.8%)-23331 (45.54%). W. Jeff Evans, the 2007 Republican candidate, ran as an independent, finishing third with 7.58% of the vote.

Stanley wrote the 2023 Virginia law requiring age verification for access to online pornography. He has said that this has led to threats against his family.

== Notes ==
Senate of Virginia
Preceded by Robert Hurt	Member of the Virginia Senate from the 19th district 2011–2012	Succeeded by Ralph Smith
Preceded by Roscoe Reynolds	Member of the Virginia Senate from the 20th district 2012–2024	Succeeded by Bill DeSteph
Preceded by Aaron Rouse	Member of the Virginia Senate from the 7th district 2024–Present	Incumbent
