= Virginia's 22nd Senate district =

American legislative district

Virginia's 22nd State Senate district
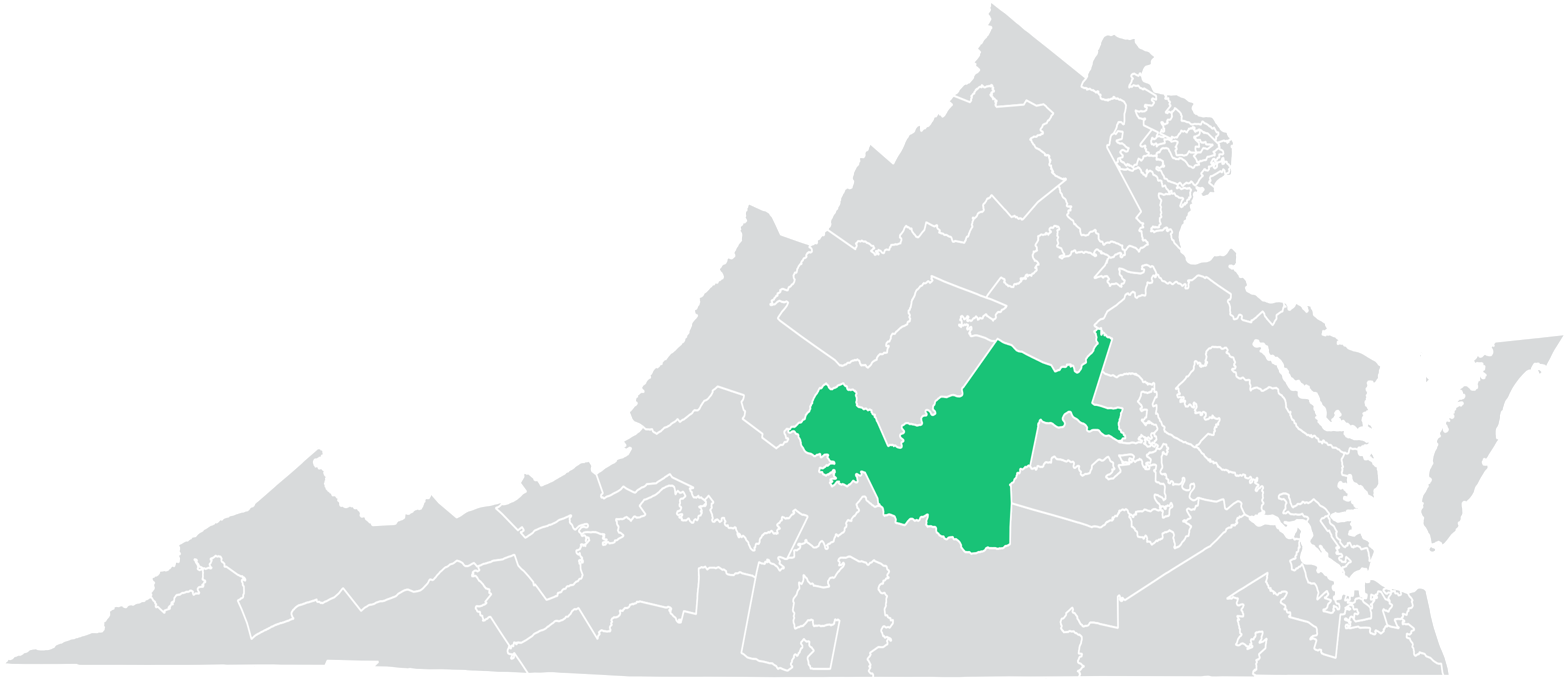
Senator
| Aaron Rouse; D–Virginia Beach |
- Demographics: 69% White; 24% Black; 3% Hispanic; 1% Asian; 2% Other
- Population (2019): 199,227
- Registered voters: 138,328

Virginia's 22nd Senate district is one of 40 districts in the Senate of Virginia. After the 2020 Census and redistricting, it is located in Virginia Beach and represented by Democrat Aaron R Rouse. Before redistricting, the area covered by this district was located in central Virginia where it was represented by Republican Mark Peake since he ran to replace fellow Republican Tom Garrett in a 2017 special election.

== Geography ==
District 22 is located in southeastern Virginia, particularly the Hampton Roads region, including a portion of the independent City of Virginia Beach.

The district is located entirely within Virginia's 2nd congressional district, and overlaps with the 95th, 96th, and 97th districts of the Virginia House of Delegates.

== Recent election results ==
=== 2019 ===
County and independent city results Peake: 50–60%; 60–70%; 70–80%; Claytor: 50–60%

2019 Virginia Senate election, District 22
| Party | Candidate | Votes | % |
|---|---|---|---|
| Republican | Mark Peake (incumbent) | 37,630 | 62.8 |
| Democratic | Dakota Claytor | 22,254 | 37.1 |
| Total votes | | 59,961 | 100 |
| Republican hold | | | |

=== 2017 special ===
County and independent city results Peake: 40–50%; 50–60%; 60–70%; 70–80%; Washington: 30–40%; 40–50%; 50–60%

2017 Virginia Senate special election, District 22
| Party | Candidate | Votes | % |
|---|---|---|---|
| Republican | Mark Peake | 13,713 | 53.1 |
| Democratic | Ryant Washington | 10,226 | 39.6 |
| Independent | Joe Hines | 1,884 | 8.9 |
| Total votes | | 25,842 | 100 |
| Republican hold | | | |

=== 2015 ===
2015 Virginia Senate election, District 22
| Party | Candidate | Votes | % |
|---|---|---|---|
| Republican | Tom Garrett (incumbent) | 24,913 | 95.3 |
| Write-in | | 1,247 | 4.7 |
| Total votes | | 26,132 | 100 |
| Republican hold | | | |

=== 2011 ===
General election results by county and independent city Garrett: 50–60%; 60–70%; 70–80%; Dodson: 50–60%

2011 Virginia Senate election, District 22
Primary election
| Party | Candidate | Votes | % |
|---|---|---|---|
| Republican | Tom Garrett | 3,240 | 26.0 |
| Republican | Brian Bates | 3,069 | 24.6 |
| Republican | Mark Peake | 2,810 | 22.5 |
| Republican | Bryan Rhode | 2,560 | 20.5 |
| Republican | Claudia Tucker | 797 | 6.4 |
| Total votes | | 12,478 | 100 |
General election
| Republican | Tom Garrett | 28,357 | 58.1 |
| Democratic | Bert Dodson | 20,389 | 41.8 |
| Total votes | | 48,815 | 100 |
| Republican hold | | | |

=== Federal and statewide results ===
| Year | Office | Results |
|---|---|---|
| 2020 | President | Trump 56.1–42.1% |
| 2017 | Governor | Gillespie 57.1–41.8% |
| 2016 | President | Trump 54.8–40.6% |
| 2014 | Senate | Gillespie 55.4–42.0% |
| 2013 | Governor | Cuccinelli 52.9–39.4% |
| 2012 | President | Romney 53.6–44.9% |
| 2012 | Senate | Allen 53.8–46.2% |

== Historical results ==
All election results below took place prior to 2011 redistricting, and thus were under different district lines. Under the lines drawn in 2011, 22nd district incumbent Ralph K. Smith was redrawn into the 19th district, making the 22nd district an open seat.

=== 2007 ===
2007 Virginia Senate election, District 22
Primary election
| Party | Candidate | Votes | % |
|---|---|---|---|
| Republican | Ralph K. Smith | 3,645 | 50.5 |
| Republican | Brandon Bell (incumbent) | 3,570 | 49.5 |
| Total votes | | 7,215 | 100 |
General election
| Republican | Ralph K. Smith | 21,193 | 50.8 |
| Democratic | Michael Breiner | 20,452 | 49.0 |
| Total votes | | 41,757 | 100 |
| Republican hold | | | |

=== 2003 ===
2003 Virginia Senate election, District 22
| Party | Candidate | Votes | % |
|---|---|---|---|
| Republican | Brandon Bell | 23,810 | 56.7 |
| Democratic | Stephen Emick | 18,140 | 43.2 |
| Total votes | | 41,956 | 100 |
| Republican hold | | | |

=== 1999 ===
1999 Virginia Senate election, District 22
| Party | Candidate | Votes | % |
|---|---|---|---|
| Republican | Malfourd W. Trumbo (incumbent) | 27,378 | 99.9 |
| Total votes | | 27,406 | 100 |
| Republican hold | | | |

=== 1995 ===
1995 Virginia Senate election, District 22
| Party | Candidate | Votes | % |
|---|---|---|---|
| Republican | Malfourd W. Trumbo (incumbent) | 34,312 | 99.9 |
| Total votes | | 34,361 | 100 |
| Republican hold | | | |

== District officeholders ==
| Years | Senator, District 22 | Counties/Cities in District |
|---|---|---|
| 1940–1944 | W. D. Medley (D) | Arlington County |
| 1944–1948 | W. D. Medley (D) | Arlington County |
| 1948–1952 | Charles R. Fenwick (D) | Arlington County |
| 1952–1956 | Charles R. Fenwick (D) | Arlington County |
| 1956–1960 | Curry Carter (D) | Augusta County, Highland County, and the Cities of Staunton, Virginia and Waynesboro, Virginia |
| 1960–1964 | Curry Carter (D) | Augusta County, Highland County, and the Cities of Staunton, Virginia and Waynesboro, Virginia |
| 1964–1966 | Curry Carter (D) | Augusta County, Bath County, Highland County, and the City of Staunton, Virginia and the City of Waynesboro, Virginia |
| 1966–1968 | Edward O. McCue (D) | Albemarle County, Cumberland County, Fluvanna County, Greene County, Madison County, Powhatan County and the City of Charlottesville |
| 1968–1972 | James Harry Michael Jr. (D) | Albemarle County, Cumberland County, Fluvanna County, Greene County, Madison County, Powhatan County and the City of Charlottesville |
| 1972–1976 | David F. Thornton (R) | Allegheny County, Bath County, Botetourt County, Roanoke County (part) and all of the cities of Salem, Clifton Forge and Covington |
| 1976–1980 | Buzz Emick (D) | Allegheny County, Bath County, Botetourt County, Roanoke County (part) and all of the cities of Salem, Clifton Forge and Covington |
| 1980–1984 | Buzz Emick (D) | Allegheny County, Bath County, Botetourt County, Roanoke County (part) and all of the cities of Salem, Clifton Forge and Covington |
| 1984–1988 | Buzz Emick (D) | Allegheny County, Bath County, Botetourt County, Roanoke County (part) and all of the cities of Salem, Clifton Forge and Covington |
| 1988–1992 | Buzz Emick (D) | Allegheny County, Bath County, Botetourt County, Roanoke County (part) and all of the cities of Salem, Clifton Forge and Covington |
| 1992–1996 | Malfourd W. "Bo" Trumbo | Allegheny County, Bath County, Botetourt County, Craig County, Giles County, Pulaski County (part), Roanoke County (part) and all of the cities of Clifton Forge, Covington, Radford and Salem |
| 1996–2000 | Malfourd W. "Bo" Trumbo | Allegheny County, Bath County, Botetourt County, Craig County, Giles County, Pulaski County (part), Roanoke County (part) and all of the cities of Clifton Forge, Covington, Radford and Salem |
| 2000–2004 | Malfourd W. "Bo" Trumbo | Allegheny County, Bath County, Botetourt County, Craig County, Giles County, Pulaski County (part), Roanoke County (part) and all of the cities of Clifton Forge, Covington, Radford and Salem |
| 2004–2008 | J. Brandon Bell (R) | Botetourt County, the City of Radford, the City of Salem, Montgomery County (part) and Roanoke County (part) |
| 2008–2012 | Ralph K. Smith (R) | Botetourt County, the City of Radford, the City of Salem, Montgomery County (part) and Roanoke County (part) |
| 2012–2016 | Tom Garrett (R) | Amherst County, Appomattox County, Buckingham County, Cumberland County, Fluvanna County, Goochland County, Prince Edward County, Parts of Louisa County and Lynchburg City |
| 2017–present | Mark Peake (R) | Amherst County, Appomattox County, Buckingham County, Cumberland County, Fluvanna County, Goochland County, Prince Edward County, Parts of Louisa County and Lynchburg City |
