= Ralph K. Smith =

American politician (born 1942)

Ralph Smith

Member of the Virginia Senate from the 19th district
- In office January 11, 2012 – January 13, 2016
- Preceded by: Bill Stanley
- Succeeded by: David Suetterlein

Member of the Virginia Senate from the 22nd district
- In office January 9, 2008 – January 11, 2012
- Preceded by: Brandon Bell
- Succeeded by: Tom Garrett

Mayor of Roanoke, Virginia
- In office July 1, 2000 – June 30, 2004
- Preceded by: David A. Bowers
- Succeeded by: Nelson Harris

Personal details
- Born: Ralph Kelly Smith; July 19, 1942 (age 84) Roanoke, Virginia, U.S.
- Party: Republican
- Education: Lincoln Tech

Military service
- Allegiance: United States
- Branch/service: United States Coast Guard
- Years of service: 1964–1970
- Unit: U.S. Coast Guard Reserve

Ralph Kelly Smith (born July 19, 1942) is an American politician and businessman. A Republican, Smith was the mayor of Roanoke and served two terms in the Virginia Senate.

== Personal life ==
Smith was born and grew up in the Williamson Road area of Roanoke, Virginia. Smith attended public schools in Roanoke City including William Fleming High School before graduating from Nashville Auto/Diesel College in 1961.

Smith went into business as a service station operator in 1966 and began Ralph Smith Inc. The business quickly expanded into steel fabrication with a specialty for producing trailer hitches. Over the decades, Ralph Smith Inc. also sold bicycles, produced wood-burning stoves, and was involved in a variety of manufacturing, retail, and real estate enterprises. Smith significantly scaled back Ralph Smith Inc.'s ventures in recent years so he could devote his attention to his work in the State Senate.

Smith is a member of First Baptist Church in Roanoke, a Roanoke post of the AmVets, the Williamson Road Lions Club, and the Williamson Road Area Business Association. Smith was previously on the boards of First Citizens Bank, VAS Explore Park, the Miss Virginia Pageant, and the Mill Mountain Advisory Committee.

In 2009, Smith was elected chairman of Freedom Alliance's Board of Directors. Freedom Alliance is a 501(c)3 educational and charitable foundation with a mission to honor and encourage military service.

Smith has lived in the Roanoke Valley his entire life with the exceptions of when he was being educated at Nashville Auto/Diesel College and during periods of his military service with the United States Coast Guard Reserve between 1964 and 1970.

== Political career ==
Smith became involved in Virginia Republican politics in the early 1990s, and was elected Chairman of the Roanoke City Republican Committee in 1996. That year Smith was also elected as a Delegate to the 1996 Republican National Convention in San Diego, CA. Smith was also elected as a Delegate to the 2004 Republican National Convention in New York, NY.

=== Mayor of Roanoke ===
Smith defeated two-term Democratic incumbent Mayor David Bowers in a four-way race on May 2, 2000. Smith won 35% of the vote and because of the very high voter turnout, won 404 votes more than Mayor Nelson Harris would win while capturing a plurality of 37% in the 2004 election when Smith did not seek re-election.

Smith was the lone Republican member of the Roanoke City Council during most of his tenure and was frequently opposed by the six Democratic council members when he attempted to minimize and reduce city spending. Smith often sought to work with other localities to promote the entire Roanoke Valley. Smith successfully initiated the creation of the Western Virginia Water Authority, which consolidated the water delivery systems of Roanoke City and Roanoke County.

Smith did not seek re-election and moved to neighboring Botetourt County. This decision and comments made by Smith led to speculation that he was interested in following Delegate Lacey Putney in the Virginia House of Delegates.

=== State Senate ===
The Roanoke Times reported on October 26, 2006, that Smith might be receptive to the efforts by Roanoke Valley Republican activists seeking to draft him to challenge incumbent Republican State Senator Brandon Bell. On January 8, 2007, Smith announced that he would challenge Bell for the Republican nomination in the June 12, 2007 Republican primary.

The campaign largely focused on Bell's support for a 2004 tax increase and Smith's record as mayor. Smith was outspent by Bell $301,924 to $80,867 but was able to win 51%-49%. Smith ran up large margins in the more populous counties of Botetourt and Roanoke which also turned out to vote at higher rates than Montgomery County or the cities of Radford and Salem that Bell won.

Smith faced plastic surgeon and Democratic nominee Michael Breiner in the November 6, 2007 general election. Breiner repeatedly attacked Smith for a "38 % decrease" in funding to social services. Smith and the Roanoke Times countered that Breiner's allegations against Smith were misleading because the actual vote was part of Roanoke's unanimously passed 2001–2002 budget that was assembled by the city manager. Smith was again outspent by his opponent, this time by a margin of $732,428 to $283,131. Smith won the general election 51%-49%.

Smith was sworn into the Senate of Virginia on January 9, 2008 and appointed to serve on the Transportation, Local Government, and Privileges and Elections committees.

Smith has accumulated a conservative voting record since joining the Senate, receiving a 100% rating from the Virginia Family Foundation and successfully sponsoring legislation supported by the National Rifle Association. Smith has also continued his support for regional initiatives in the Senate and been a proponent of the Western Regional Jail.

In 2009, Smith successfully sponsored legislation that "Adds the benefits, challenges, responsibilities, and value of marriage for men, women, children, and communities to the list of topics to be covered in family life education curricula."

That year, Smith also introduced legislation that would require the budget to be publicly available for 72 hours before legislators could vote. In the previous year, the Commonwealth's $77 billion budget was presented to legislators just 34 minutes before the vote. Smith's bill won the praise of the Roanoke Times editorial board, but was defeated in the Senate Finance Committee.

Smith argued that both the 2008 and 2009 budget bills contained overly optimistic revenue projections and opposed both bills. Actual revenue for 2008 and 2009 failed to meet the projections and necessitated Governor Tim Kaine to reduce state funding of transportation, higher education, and other services.
