= ARLnow =

- Type: Online newspaper
- Publisher: Local News Now LLC
- Founded: 2010; 16 years ago
- Headquarters: Ballston, Virginia, U.S.
- Sister newspapers: ALXnow, Reston Now, Tysons Reporter
- Website: www.arlnow.com

ARLnow is a local online newspaper covering news in Arlington County, Virginia.

== History ==
Scott Brodbeck started ARLnow in January 2010. ARLnow publishes Morning Notes every day with a roundup of local news and includes a weather report for each day. The site is updated throughout the day.

== Recognition ==
In 2020, for their coverage of Amazon HQ2, the Washington, D.C. chapter of the Society of Professional Journalists awarded ARLnow journalists with the 2019 Dateline Award for online business reporting.

== Publications ==
In addition to ARLnow, Local News Now operates other local news sites in Northern Virginia, including ALXnow in Alexandria, Reston Now in Reston, and Tysons Reporter in Tysons.
