= Tom Garrett (Virginia politician) =

American politician (born 1972)

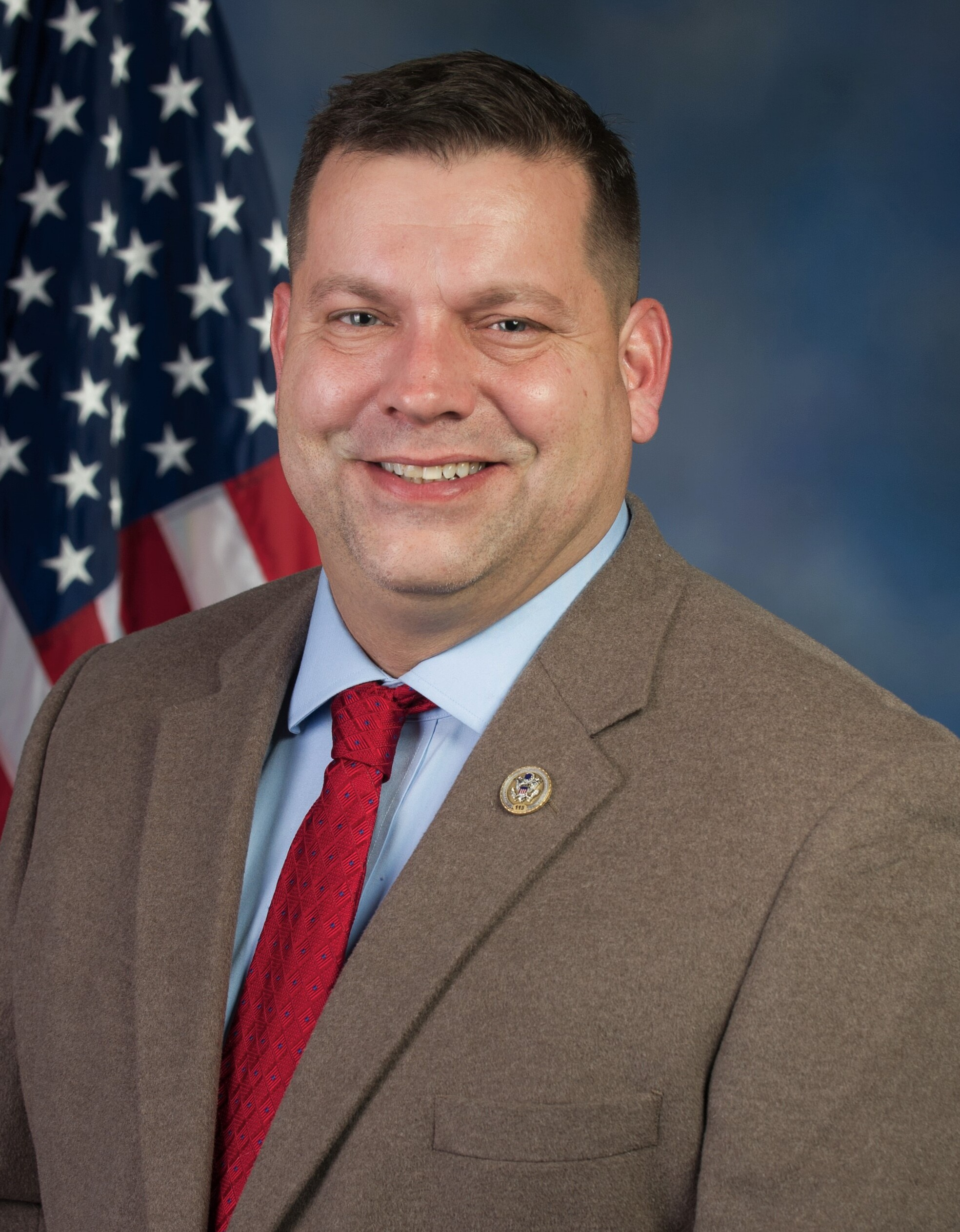
- Official portrait, 2017

Member of the Virginia House of Delegates from the 56th district
- Incumbent
- Assumed office January 10, 2024
- Preceded by: John McGuire

Member of the U.S. House of Representatives from Virginia's 5th district
- In office January 3, 2017 – January 3, 2019
- Preceded by: Robert Hurt
- Succeeded by: Denver Riggleman

Member of the Virginia Senate from the 22nd district
- In office January 11, 2012 – January 3, 2017
- Preceded by: Ralph K. Smith
- Succeeded by: Mark Peake

Commonwealth's Attorney of Louisa County
- In office January 1, 2008 – December 31, 2011
- Preceded by: Don Short
- Succeeded by: Rusty McGuire

Personal details
- Born: Thomas Alexander Garrett Jr. March 27, 1972 (age 54) Atlanta, Georgia, U.S.
- Party: Republican
- Spouses: Dana Garrett (m. 1998; div. 2009); Flanna Sheridan (m. 2016; sep. 2019)
- Children: 3 daughters
- Education: University of Richmond (BA, JD)

Military service
- Branch/service: United States Army
- Years of service: 1995–2000
- Rank: Captain
- Unit: 214th Fires Brigade

Thomas Alexander Garrett Jr. (born March 27, 1972) is an American politician and attorney. He served one term in the United States House of Representatives for Virginia's 5th congressional district. A Republican, Garrett formerly represented the 22nd district in the Virginia Senate. In November 2022, Garrett announced he would run for the Virginia House of Delegates in 2023. In the 2023 Virginia House of Delegates election he was elected in the 56th district.

== Early life and education ==
Thomas Garrett was born in Atlanta, Georgia, to Thomas Alexander Garrett Sr. and his wife, Lois. Garrett is a graduate of Louisa County High School and earned his undergraduate and law degrees from the University of Richmond.

== Career ==
Garrett served for six years in the United States Army, where he was a Field Artillery officer.

=== Commonwealth's attorney ===
Garrett served as an Assistant Attorney General under Virginia Attorney General Bob McDonnell. In 2007, he was elected Commonwealth's Attorney for Louisa County.

=== State Senate ===
After the General Assembly redistricted the State Senate as required by the Virginia Constitution in 2011, Garrett decided to run for an open seat. The 22nd District was open due to the incumbent Republican Ralph K. Smith's home in Roanoke being drawn into another district.

In the Republican primary, Garrett came in first in a five-person field with nearly 26% of the vote and a margin of fewer than 200 votes. During his time in office, he served on the General Laws and Technology, Courts of Justice, Education and Health, and Privileges and Elections committees.

== U.S House of Representatives ==
=== Elections ===
==== 2016 ====
In May 2016, after three ballots at the Republican nominating convention, Garrett won the Republican nomination for U.S. Representative in Virginia's 5th congressional district.

In the November 2016 general election, Garrett defeated Democratic nominee Jane Dittmar, the former chairwoman of the Albemarle County Board of Supervisors. Garrett won with 58.2% of the vote to Dittmar's 41.6%.

==== 2018 ====
In the spring of 2018, reports surfaced that Garrett and his wife, Flanna, used his congressional staff for personal use, leading his chief of staff to abruptly resign. Personal use of the staff time included running errands, house sitting, chauffeuring his children, and cleaning up after their dog.

Rumors also spread that Garrett might not run again. Garrett clarified later that he intended to run in what political analyst Larry Sabato called "one of the oddest" speeches. As of April 2018, Garrett was outraised by multiple Democratic opponents. In light of these fundraising numbers, the Cook Political Report moved the race from "likely Republican" to the more competitive "leans Republican." Democrats went on to nominate former investigative journalist Leslie Cockburn.

On May 28, 2018, Garrett announced that he is an alcoholic and would not seek reelection in 2018.

=== Tenure ===
In January 2017, Garrett was named to the House Committees on Foreign Affairs, Homeland Security, and Education and the Workforce. He was also a member of the conservative House Freedom Caucus, though he told voters during the campaign that he would not join the group. Garrett was a member of the Republican Study Committee.

In March 2017, Garrett posed for a photo with Jason Kessler, one of his constituents who was an organizer of the Unite the Right rally, a far-right rally held in August 2017 in Charlottesville, Virginia. The rally became the site of violent clashes, leaving about 30 people injured, followed shortly by an incident in which a white supremacist rammed his car into a crowd, killing a woman and injuring 19 other people. After the rally, Garrett disavowed the organizer and said he was unaware of Kessler's role in the rally when they initially met.

== Personal life ==
In April 2019, Garrett and his wife, Flanna Sheridan, separated. In August 2021, Sheridan filed suit in Rockingham County Circuit Court for false imprisonment, emotional distress, trespassing and civil assault, seeking $450,000 in damages stemming from an attempt by Garrett to repossess a vehicle driven by Sheridan.

U.S. House of Representatives
Preceded by Robert Hurt	Member of the U.S. House of Representatives from Virginia's 5th congressional district 2017–2019	Succeeded by Denver Riggleman
U.S. order of precedence (ceremonial)
Preceded by Tom Perriello as Former U.S. Representative	Order of precedence of the United States as Former U.S. Representative	Succeeded by Scott Taylor as Former U.S. Representative
