= Noel C. Taylor =

American politician (1924–1999)

41st Mayor of Roanoke, Virginia
- In office October 27, 1975 – June 30, 1992
- Preceded by: Roy L. Webber
- Succeeded by: David A. Bowers

Personal details
- Born: Noel Calvin Taylor; July 15, 1924 Moneta, Virginia, U.S.
- Died: October 29, 1999 (aged 75) Roanoke, Virginia, U.S.
- Party: Republican
- Spouse: Barbara Smith
- Education: Bluefield State College; New York University; Virginia Seminary

Military service
- Allegiance: United States
- Branch/service: United States Army
- Years of service: 1943–1945
- Battles/wars: World War II

Noel Calvin Taylor (July 15, 1924 – October 29, 1999) was an American politician who served as the 41st mayor of Roanoke, Virginia, from 1975 to 1992. An African American leader who helped facilitate Roanoke's peaceful desegregation in the late 1960s, Taylor was widely considered one of the most influential political and civic leaders in the city's history.

Taylor was pastor of the historic High Street Baptist Church in Roanoke's northwest neighborhood from 1961 until his death in 1999.

== Early life, education, family ==
Taylor was born on July 15, 1924, in Moneta, Virginia.

Taylor attended the historically black college and university Bluefield State College, graduating in 1949 with a Bachelor of Science with honors. He also attended Virginia Seminary and College, graduating in 1955 with a Masters of Divinity and a in 1959 with a Doctors of Divinity. In 1963, Taylor earned a Master of Arts in Religious Education from New York University.

== Education, Ministerial Career ==
After graduating from Bluefield State College in 1949, Taylor became a teacher in the Bedford County, Virginia Public School. Between 1950 and 1952, Taylor served as an elementary school principal.

In 1950, Taylor became an ordained Baptist Church Pastor. He pastored several churches: First Baptist Church - Clifton Forge, Virginia in 1954; First Baptist Church (Berkley) in Norfolk, Virginia between 1958 and 1961; and High Street Baptist Church in Roanoke, Virginia from 1961 until his death.

== Political, Mayoral Career ==
In 1970, Taylor became the first African American elected to Roanoke, Virginia's City Council. He served as vice-mayor between 1974 and 1975. In 1975, he was appointed Mayor to complete the term of Roy L. Webber who died while in office. In 1976, Taylor became the first African American elected as mayor of Roanoke, Virginia. He served as mayor from 1976 to 1992. He was a member of the Republican Party.

He was widely considered one of the most influential leaders in the city's history. During his mayoral term, he oversaw downtown Roanoke's revitalization and the inaugural development of Valley View Mall.

== Civic Leadership ==
Taylor served on the board of directors of the First National Exchange Bank, the Virginia Board of directors of the American Red Cross, the board of the Blue Cross and Blue Shield - Southwestern Virginia, the board of Baptist Children's Home, the board of the Blue Ridge Mountains Council - Boy Scouts of America. He was also a member of the Virginia Coal Research and Development Advisory Council.

== Death ==
Taylor died on October 29, 1999, in Roanoke, Virginia. He was interred in southern Bedford County.

Political offices
Preceded by Roy L. Webber	Roanoke, Virginia Mayor; 1975–1992	Succeeded by David A. Bowers
