= Virginia's 19th Senate district =

American legislative district

Virginia's 19th State Senate district
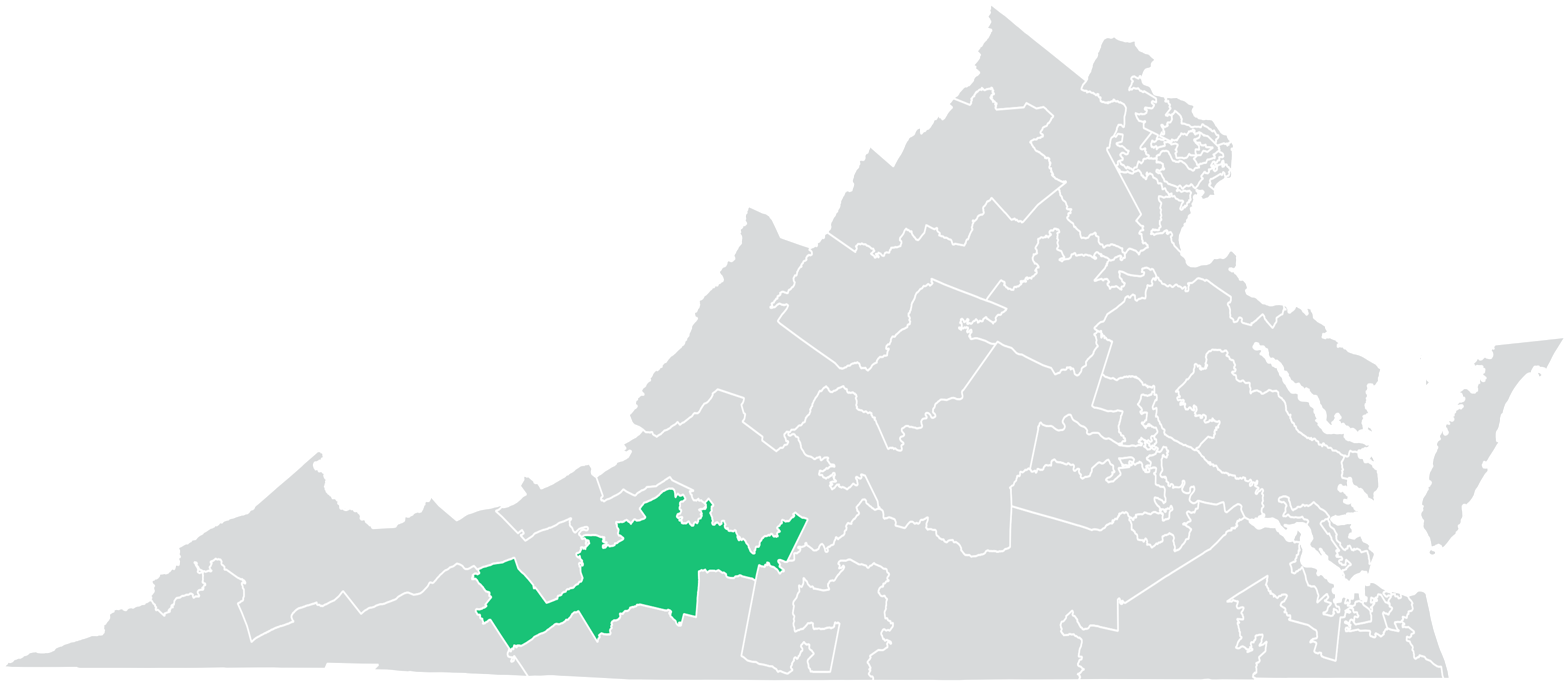
Senator
Christie New Craig; R–Chesapeake
- Demographics: 90% White; 4% Black; 3% Hispanic; 1% Asian; 2% Other
- Population (2019): 201,807
- Registered voters: 144,997

Virginia's 19th Senate district is one of 40 districts in the Senate of Virginia. In the 2023 Virginia Senate election, Christie Craig was elected.

== Geography ==
District 19 is located in the extreme portion of southeastern Virginia, including portions of the City of Chesapeake and the City of Virginia Beach. It is located in the Hampton Roads region.

The district overlaps with Virginia's 2nd and 3rd congressional districts, and with the 89th, 90th, 91st, 97th, 98th, and 99th districts of the Virginia House of Delegates.

== Recent election results ==
=== 2019 ===
2019 Virginia Senate election, District 19
Party	Candidate	Votes	%
Republican	David Suetterlein (incumbent)	41,290	71.4
Democratic	Flourette Ketner	16,484	28.5
Total votes		57,821	100
Republican hold			

=== 2015 ===
2015 Virginia Senate election, District 19
Party	Candidate	Votes	%
Republican	David Suetterlein	33,120	64.9
Democratic	Michael Hamler	15,738	30.8
Independent	Steven Nelson	2,134	4.2
Total votes		51,063	100
Republican hold			

=== 2011 ===
2011 Virginia Senate election, District 19
Party	Candidate	Votes	%
Republican	Ralph K. Smith (incumbent)	28,065	56.3
Independent	Brandon Bell	21,551	43.3
Total votes		49,807	100
Republican hold			

=== Federal and statewide results ===
Year	Office	Results
2020	President	Trump 68.1–30.1%
2017	Governor	Gillespie 65.6–33.2%
2016	President	Trump 66.7–28.8%
2014	Senate	Gillespie 60.8–36.4%
2013	Governor	Cuccinelli 60.7–30.2%
2012	President	Romney 63.6–34.2%
2012	Senate	Allen 62.5–37.5%

== Historical results ==
All election results below took place prior to 2011 redistricting, and thus were under different district lines. In 2011, Ralph K. Smith, the incumbent from the 22nd district, was redistricted into the 19th district; meanwhile, then-19th district incumbent Bill Stanley was redistricted into the 20th district.

=== 2011 special ===
2011 Virginia Senate special election, District 19
Party	Candidate	Votes	%
Republican	Bill Stanley	10,287	61.4
Democratic	Henry Davis, Jr.	6,430	38.4
Total votes		16,746	100
Republican hold			

=== 2007 ===
2007 Virginia Senate election, District 19
Party	Candidate	Votes	%
Republican	Robert Hurt	29,735	75.7
Independent	Sherman Witcher	9,488	24.2
Total votes		36,269	100
Republican hold			

=== 2003 ===
2003 Virginia Senate election, District 19
Party	Candidate	Votes	%
Republican	Charles R. Hawkins (incumbent)	23,622	100
Total votes		23,627	100
Republican hold			

=== 1999 ===
1999 Virginia Senate election, District 19
Party	Candidate	Votes	%
Republican	Charles R. Hawkins (incumbent)	17,834	99.9
Total votes		17,843	100
Republican hold			

=== 1995 ===
1995 Virginia Senate election, District 19
Party	Candidate	Votes	%
Republican	Charles R. Hawkins (incumbent)	27,350	70.8
Democratic	Joyce Glaise	11,302	29.2
Total votes		38,653	100
Republican hold			
