= 109th Virginia General Assembly =

CCO

←	108th	110th	→
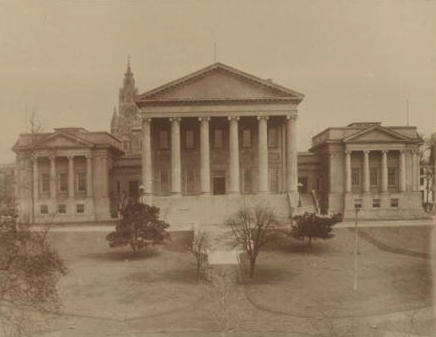
- Virginia State Capitol (1912)

Overview
- Legislative body: Virginia General Assembly
- Jurisdiction: Virginia, United States
- Term: January 12, 1916 – January 9, 1918

Senate of Virginia
- Members: 40 senators
- President: J. Taylor Ellyson (D)
- President pro tempore: C. Harding Walker (D)
- Party control: Democratic Party

Virginia House of Delegates
- Members: 100 delegates
- Speaker: Harry R. Houston (D)
- Party control: Democratic Party

Sessions
- 1st: January 12, 1916 – March 18, 1916

The 109th Virginia General Assembly was the meeting of the legislative branch of the Virginia state government from 1916 to 1918, after the 1915 state elections. It convened in Richmond for one session, which started on January 12, 1916, and ended on March 18, 1916.

== Background ==
The 1916 General Assembly took place during the latter half of Henry Carter Stuart's governorship. It was the last full session during which J. Taylor Ellyson served as lieutenant governor and president of the state senate; as of 2013, he is the only person in Virginia history to have served three terms in that office.

On November 1, 1916, seven months after the body adjourned, statewide prohibition went into effect. Senator G. Walter Mapp and temperance advocate James Cannon, Jr. (not to be confused with Senator James E. Cannon) drafted the final bill after voters endorsed a referendum in September 1914.

== Party summary ==
Resignations and new members are discussed in the "Changes in membership" section, below.

=== Senate ===
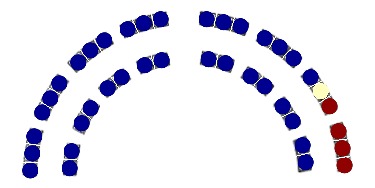
Senate Party standings (at the beginning of this session) 35 Democrats 1 Independent 4 Republicans

	Party (Shading indicates majority caucus)			Total	Vacant
	Democratic	Independent	Republican	Total	Vacant
End of previous session	35	0	5	40	0
Begin	35	1	4	40	0
December 7, 1917	34	1	4	39	1
Latest voting share	87.2%	12.8%			
Beginning of next session	35	1	4	40	0

=== House of Delegates ===
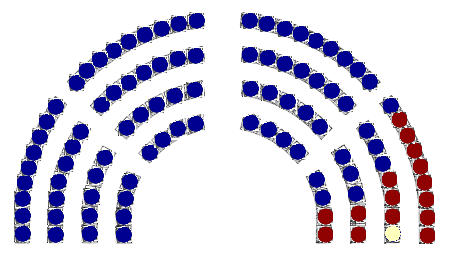
House Party standings (at the beginning of this session) 84 Democrats 1 Independent 15 Republicans

	Party (Shading indicates majority caucus)			Total	Vacant
	Democratic	Independent	Republican	Total	Vacant
End of previous session	-	-	-	100	0
Begin	84	1	15	100	0
Latest voting share	84%	16%			
Beginning of next session	84	1	15	100	0

== Senate ==
=== Leadership ===
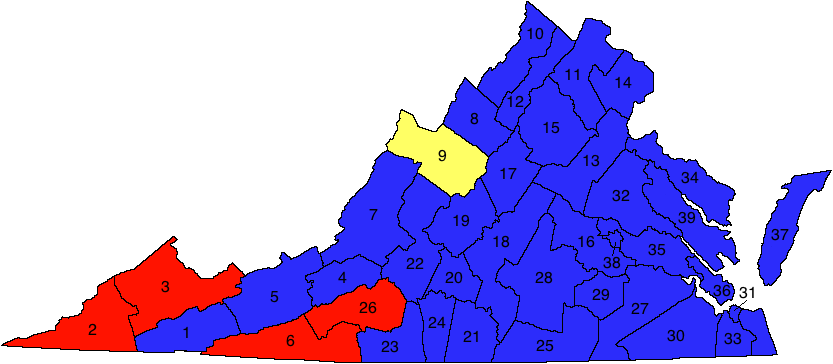
Map of Virginia's senatorial districts as they were in 1916

Office	Officer
President of the Senate	J. Taylor Ellyson (D)
President pro tempore	C. Harding Walker (D)
Minority Floor Leader	J. Powell Royall (R)

=== Members ===
District	Senator	Party	Constituency	Began serving
1st	John P. Buchanan	Democratic	Washington, Smyth, and city of Bristol	1916
2nd	John M. Goodloe	Republican	Scott, Lee, and Wise	1916
3rd	J. Powell Royall	Republican	Buchanan, Dickenson, Russell, and Tazewell	1912
4th	William L. Andrews	Democratic	Roanoke, Montgomery, and cities of Roanoke and Radford	1915
5th	E. Lee Trinkle	Democratic	Giles, Bland, Pulaski, and Wythe	1916
6th	M. Price Webb	Republican	Carroll, Grayson, and Patrick	1916
7th	William A. Rinehart	Democratic	Craig, Botetourt, Allegheny, Bath, and city of Clifton Forge	1912
8th	George N. Conrad	Democratic	Rockingham	1916
9th	Cornelius T. Jordan	Independent	Augusta, Highland, and city of Staunton	1916
10th	Harry F. Byrd	Democratic	Shenandoah, Frederick, and city of Winchester	1916
11th	Theodore C. Pilcher	Democratic	Fauquier and Loudoun	1916
12th	Henry H. Downing	Democratic	Clarke, Page, and Warren	1916
13th	C. O'Conor Goolrick	Democratic	Spotsylvania, Stafford, Louisa, and city of Fredericksburg	1915
14th	R. Ewell Thornton	Democratic	Alexandria county, Prince William, Fairfax, and city of Alexandria	1908
15th	Clyde T. Bowers	Democratic	Culpeper, Madison, Rappahannock, and Orange	1912
16th	Thomas S. Hening	Democratic	Goochland, Powhatan, and Chesterfield	1916
17th	Nathaniel B. Early	Democratic	Albemarle, Greene, and city of Charlottesville	1908
18th	Sands Gayle	Democratic	Appomattox, Buckingham, Fluvanna, and Charlotte	1910
19th	Aubrey E. Strode	Democratic	Amherst and Nelson	1916 (previously served 1906-1912)
20th	Walter E. Addison	Democratic	Campbell and city of Lynchburg	1916
21st	James T. Lacy	Democratic	Halifax	1916
22nd	A. Willis Robertson	Democratic	Bedford, Rockbridge, and city of Buena Vista	1916
23rd	William A. Garrett	Democratic	Pittsylvania, Henry, and city of Danville	1901
24th	George T. Rison	Democratic	Pittsylvania and city of Danville	1904
25th	William H. Jeffreys Jr.	Democratic	Mecklenburg and Brunswick	1916
26th	Beverly A. Davis	Republican	Franklin and Floyd	1916
27th	Sidney B. Barham Jr.	Democratic	Greensville, Sussex, Surry, and Prince George	1916
28th	George E. Allen	Democratic	Nottoway, Amelia, Lunenburg, Prince Edward, and Cumberland	1916
29th	Patrick H. Drewry	Democratic	Dinwiddie and city of Petersburg	1912
30th	Junius E. West	Democratic	Isle of Wight, Southampton, and Nansemond	1912
31st	Earl C. Mathews	Democratic	Norfolk city	1916
32nd	Charles U. Gravatt	Democratic	Caroline, Hanover, and King William	1908
33rd	William C. Corbitt	Democratic	Norfolk county and city of Portsmouth	1915
34th	C. Harding Walker	Democratic	King George, Richmond, Westmoreland, Lancaster, and Northumberland	1899
35th	Julien Gunn	Democratic	Henrico, New Kent, Charles City, James City, and city of Williamsburg	1916
36th	Saxon W. Holt	Democratic	Elizabeth City, York, Warwick, and city of Newport News	1904
37th	G. Walter Mapp	Democratic	Accomac, Northampton, and Princess Anne	1912
38th	James E. Cannon	Democratic	Richmond city	1914
38th	Louis O. Wendenburg	Democratic	Richmond city	1912
39th	John R. Saunders	Democratic	King and Queen, Middlesex, Essex, Gloucester, and Mathews	1908

== House of Delegates ==
=== Leadership ===
Office	Officer
Speaker of the House	Harry R. Houston (D)
Majority Floor Leader	R. Holman Willis (D)
Minority Floor Leader	Marion K. Lowry (R)

=== Members ===
Constituency	Delegate	Party
Accomac (part)	J. Harry Rew	Democratic
Albemarle; Charlottesville	David H. Pitts	Democratic
Albemarle; Charlottesville	Samuel M. Page	Democratic
Alexandria City; Alexandria County	J. Frederick Birrell	Democratic
Alleghany; Craig	Bernard C. Goodwin	Democratic
Amherst	T. Freeman Epes	Democratic
Appomattox	M. P. Gatewood	Democratic
Amelia; Nottoway	Richard L. Burke	Democratic
Augusta; Staunton	Herbert J. Taylor	Democratic
Augusta; Staunton	W. W. Sproul	Democratic
Bath; Highland; Buena Vista (part); Rockbridge (part)	John W. Stephenson	Democratic
Bedford	H. C. Lowry	Democratic
Bedford	George G. Turner	Democratic
Botetourt	J. B. Buhrman	Republican
Brunswick	W. B. Valentine	Democratic
Buckingham; Cumberland	H. P. Baker	Democratic
Campbell	Robert A. Russell	Democratic
Caroline	R. L. Beale	Democratic
Carroll	W. Glenn Edwards	Republican
Charlotte	Berkley D. Adams	Democratic
Chesterfield (part)	W. W. Baker	Democratic
Chesterfield (part); Powhatan	Emmett Lee Mann	Democratic
Clarke; Warren	Kenneth N. Gilpin	Democratic
Culpeper	Harry B. Smith	Democratic
Dickenson; Wise	W. H. Roberts	Republican
Dinwiddie	John Y. Harris	Democratic
Elizabeth City	Harry R. Houston	Democratic
Fairfax	Franklin Williams Jr.	Democratic
Fauquier (part)	W. N. Tiffany	Democratic
Fauquier (part); Loudoun (part)	John O. Daniel	Democratic
Floyd	W. E. Phillips	Republican
Franklin	A. S. Adams	Democratic
Frederick; Winchester	John M. Steck	Democratic
Giles; Bland	Anderson E. Shumate	Democratic
Gloucester	M. E. Bristow	Democratic
Goochland; Fluvanna	George A. Bowles	Democratic
Grayson	M. O. Cornett	Republican
Halifax	S. T. A. Kent	Democratic
Halifax	Daniel W. Owen	Democratic
Hanover (part)	W. B. Walton	Democratic
Henrico	Harry C. Beattie	Democratic
Henry	John W. Ramsey	Democratic
Isle of Wight	Thomas B. Wright	Democratic
King and Queen; Essex	Deane Hundley	Democratic
King William; Hanover (part)	Thomas C. Commins	Democratic
Lancaster; Richmond County	Robert O. Norris Jr.	Democratic
Lee	W. S. Coldiron	Republican
Loudoun (part)	B. F. Noland	Democratic
Louisa	R. Lindsay Gordon Jr.	Democratic
Lunenburg	Stephen Henry Love	Democratic

Constituency	Delegate	Party
Lynchburg	J. Calvin Moss	Democratic
Madison; Greene	Will A. Cook	Independent
Mathews; Middlesex	R. H. Stubbs	Democratic
Mecklenburg	Edward W. Hudgins	Democratic
Montgomery; Radford	U. G. Flanagan	Republican
Nansemond	Richard L. Brewer Jr.	Democratic
Nelson	Thomas M. Horsley	Democratic
Newport News	Philip W. Murray	Democratic
New Kent; Charles City; James City; York; Warwick; Williamsburg	Norvell L. Henley	Democratic
Norfolk City	W. P. Cousins	Democratic
Norfolk City	Lucian B. Cox	Democratic
Norfolk County	Quinton C. Davis Jr.	Democratic
Norfolk County	Channing W. Hall	Democratic
Northampton; Accomac (part)	G. Frederick Floyd	Democratic
Northumberland; Westmoreland	T. A. Jett	Democratic
Orange	George L. Browning	Democratic
Page; Rappahannock	Robert F. Leedy	Democratic
Patrick	Edmund Parr	Republican
Petersburg	Robert W. Price	Democratic
Pittsylvania; Danville	N. E. Clement	Democratic
Pittsylvania; Danville	R. L. Dodson	Democratic
Pittsylvania; Danville	Berryman Green	Democratic
Portsmouth	J. Davis Reed	Democratic
Prince Edward	Peter Winston	Democratic
Princess Anne	A. O. Baum	Democratic
Prince William	C. J. Meetze	Democratic
Pulaski	O. E. Jordan	Democratic
Richmond City	Edward R. Fuller	Democratic
Richmond City	Graham B. Hobson	Democratic
Richmond City	James P. Jones	Democratic
Richmond City	William M. Myers	Democratic
Richmond City	James H. Price	Democratic
Roanoke City	R. Holman Willis	Democratic
Roanoke County	J. Sinclair Brown	Democratic
Rockbridge (part); Buena Vista (part)	Hugh A. White	Democratic
Rockingham	Charles H. Rolston	Democratic
Rockingham	Frank J. Wright	Republican
Russell	L. B. Sutherland	Republican
Scott	G. Claude Bond	Republican
Shenandoah	Otto V. Pence	Republican
Smyth	Hezekiah L. Bonham	Republican
Southampton	J. S. Musgrave	Democratic
Spotsylvania; Fredericksburg	Granville R. Swift	Democratic
Stafford; King George	Marion K. Lowry	Republican
Surry; Prince George	David A. Harrison Jr.	Democratic
Sussex; Greensville	William Rufus Cato	Democratic
Tazewell; Buchanan	Ebb H. Witten	Republican
Washington; Bristol	E. C. Buck	Democratic
Washington; Bristol	Donald T. Stant	Democratic
Wythe	John H. Crockett	Democratic

== Changes in membership ==
=== Senate ===
- December 7, 1917, Theodore C. Pilcher (D-11th district) dies. Seat remains unfilled until start of next regular session.

== See also ==
- List of Virginia state legislatures
