= 110th Virginia General Assembly =

| ← | 109th | 111th | → |
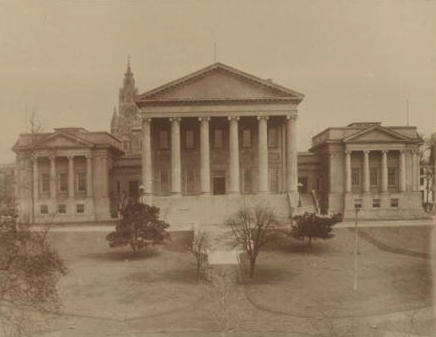
- Virginia State Capitol (1912)

Overview
- Legislative body: Virginia General Assembly
- Jurisdiction: Virginia, United States
- Term: January 9, 1918 – January 14, 1920

Senate of Virginia
- Members: 40 senators
- President: J. Taylor Ellyson (D) until February 1, 1918; Benjamin F. Buchanan (D) from February 1, 1918
- President pro tempore: C. Harding Walker (D)
- Party control: Democratic Party

Virginia House of Delegates
- Members: 100 delegates
- Speaker: Harry R. Houston (D)
- Party control: Democratic Party

Sessions
- 1st: January 9, 1918 – March 22, 1918
- 2nd: August 13, 1919 – September 9, 1919

The 110th Virginia General Assembly was the meeting of the legislative branch of the Virginia state government from 1918 to 1920, after the 1917 state elections. It convened in Richmond for two sessions.

== Party summary ==
Resignations and new members are discussed in the "Changes in membership" section, below.

=== Senate ===
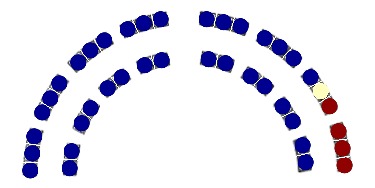
Senate Party standings (at the beginning of this session) 35 Democrats 1 Independent 4 Republicans

| | Party (Shading indicates majority caucus) | | | Total | Vacant |
| | Democratic | Independent | Republican | Total | Vacant |
|---|---|---|---|---|---|
| End of previous session | 34 | 1 | 4 | 39 | 1 |
| Begin | 35 | 1 | 4 | 40 | 0 |
| December 21, 1918 | 34 | 1 | 4 | 39 | 1 |
| January 28, 1919 | 33 | 1 | 4 | 38 | 2 |
| March 25, 1919 | 32 | 1 | 4 | 37 | 3 |
| August 13, 1919 | 35 | 1 | 4 | 40 | 0 |
| Latest voting share | 88% | 13% | | | |
| Beginning of next session | 34 | 0 | 6 | 40 | 0 |

== Senate ==
=== Leadership ===
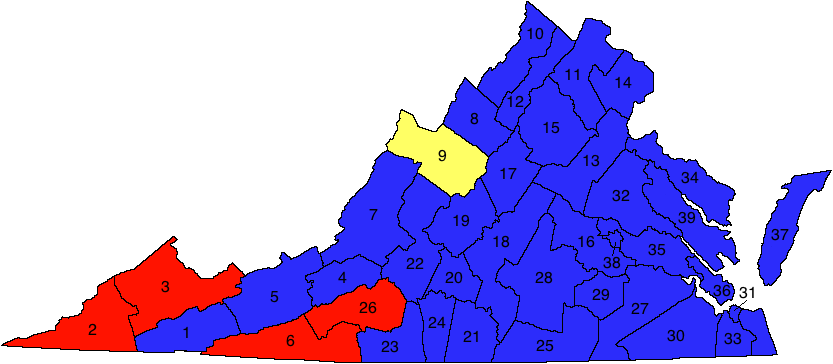
Map of Virginia's senatorial districts as they were in 1918

| Office | Officer |
|---|---|
| President of the Senate | J. Taylor Ellyson (D) until February 1, 1918 |
| President of the Senate | Benjamin F. Buchanan (D) from February 1, 1918 |
| President pro tempore | C. Harding Walker (D) |
| Minority Floor Leader | J. Powell Royall (R) |

=== Members ===
| District | Senator | Party | Constituency | Began serving |
|---|---|---|---|---|
| 1st | John P. Buchanan | Democratic | Washington, Smyth, and city of Bristol | 1916 |
| 2nd | John M. Goodloe | Republican | Scott, Lee, and Wise | 1916 |
| 3rd | J. Powell Royall | Republican | Buchanan, Dickenson, Russell, and Tazewell | 1912 |
| 4th | William L. Andrews | Democratic | Roanoke, Montgomery, and cities of Roanoke and Radford | 1915 |
| 5th | E. Lee Trinkle | Democratic | Giles, Bland, Pulaski, and Wythe | 1916 |
| 6th | M. Price Webb | Republican | Carroll, Grayson, and Patrick | 1916 |
| 7th | William A. Rinehart | Democratic | Craig, Botetourt, Allegheny, Bath, and city of Clifton Forge | 1912 |
| 8th | George N. Conrad | Democratic | Rockingham | 1916 |
| 9th | Cornelius T. Jordan | Independent | Augusta, Highland, and city of Staunton | 1916 |
| 10th | Harry F. Byrd | Democratic | Shenandoah, Frederick, and city of Winchester | 1916 |
| 11th | Lucien Keith | Democratic | Fauquier and Loudoun | 1918 |
| 12th | Henry H. Downing | Democratic | Clarke, Page, and Warren | 1916 |
| 13th | C. O'Conor Goolrick | Democratic | Spotsylvania, Stafford, Louisa, and city of Fredericksburg | 1915 |
| 14th | R. Ewell Thornton | Democratic | Alexandria county, Prince William, Fairfax, and city of Alexandria | 1908 |
| 15th | Clyde T. Bowers | Democratic | Culpeper, Madison, Rappahannock, and Orange | 1912 |
| 16th | Thomas S. Hening | Democratic | Goochland, Powhatan, and Chesterfield | 1916 |
| 17th | Nathaniel B. Early | Democratic | Albemarle, Greene, and city of Charlottesville | 1908 |
| 18th | Sands Gayle | Democratic | Appomattox, Buckingham, Fluvanna, and Charlotte | 1910 |
| 19th | Aubrey E. Strode | Democratic | Amherst and Nelson | 1916 (previously served 1906–1912) |
| 20th | Walter E. Addison | Democratic | Campbell and city of Lynchburg | 1916 |
| 21st | James T. Lacy | Democratic | Halifax | 1916 |
| 22nd | A. Willis Robertson | Democratic | Bedford, Rockbridge, and city of Buena Vista | 1916 |
| 23rd | William A. Garrett | Democratic | Pittsylvania, Henry, and city of Danville | 1901 |
| 24th | George T. Rison | Democratic | Pittsylvania and city of Danville | 1904 |
| 25th | William H. Jeffreys, Jr. | Democratic | Mecklenburg and Brunswick | 1916 |
| 26th | Beverly A. Davis | Republican | Franklin and Floyd | 1916 |
| 27th | Sidney B. Barham, Jr. | Democratic | Greensville, Sussex, Surry, and Prince George | 1916 |
| 28th | George E. Allen | Democratic | Nottoway, Amelia, Lunenburg, Prince Edward, and Cumberland | 1916 |
| 29th | Patrick H. Drewry | Democratic | Dinwiddie and city of Petersburg | 1912 |
| 30th | Junius E. West | Democratic | Isle of Wight, Southampton, and Nansemond | 1912 |
| 31st | Earl C. Mathews | Democratic | Norfolk city | 1916 |
| 32nd | Charles U. Gravatt | Democratic | Caroline, Hanover, and King William | 1908 |
| 33rd | William C. Corbitt | Democratic | Norfolk county and city of Portsmouth | 1915 |
| 34th | C. Harding Walker | Democratic | King George, Richmond, Westmoreland, Lancaster, and Northumberland | 1899 |
| 35th | Julien Gunn | Democratic | Henrico, New Kent, Charles City, James City, and city of Williamsburg | 1916 |
| 36th | Saxon W. Holt | Democratic | Elizabeth City, York, Warwick, and city of Newport News | 1904 |
| 37th | G. Walter Mapp | Democratic | Accomac, Northampton, and Princess Anne | 1912 |
| 38th | James E. Cannon | Democratic | Richmond city | 1914 |
| 38th | Louis O. Wendenburg | Democratic | Richmond city | 1912 |
| 39th | J. Douglass Mitchell | Democratic | King and Queen, Middlesex, Essex, Gloucester, and Mathews | 1918 |

== House of Delegates ==
=== Leadership ===
| Office | Officer |
|---|---|
| Speaker of the House | Harry R. Houston (D) |
| Majority Floor Leader | R. Holman Willis (D) |
| Minority Floor Leader | Roland E. Chase (R) |

== Changes in membership ==
=== Senate ===
- December 21, 1918, Sands Gayle (D-18th district) dies. Replaced by Samuel L. Ferguson at start of extra session.
- January 28, 1919, Henry H. Downing (D-12th district) dies. Replaced by Robert F. Leedy at start of extra session.
- March 25, 1919, James T. Lacy (D-21st district) resigns to accept appointment as Halifax County clerk. Replaced by Marshall B. Booker at start of extra session.

== See also ==
- List of Virginia state legislatures
