= 108th Virginia General Assembly =

Virginia state legislature 1914–1916

←	107th	109th	→
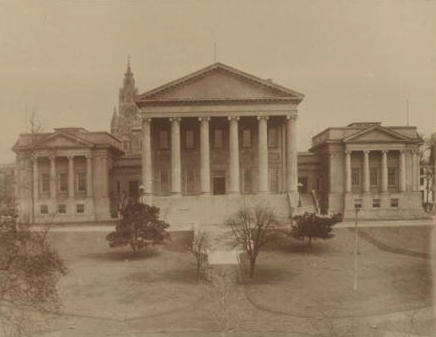
- Virginia State Capitol (1912)

Overview
- Legislative body: Virginia General Assembly
- Jurisdiction: Virginia, United States
- Term: January 14, 1914 – January 12, 1916

Senate of Virginia
- Members: 40 senators
- President: J. Taylor Ellyson (D)
- President pro tempore: Edward Echols (D) until December 19, 1914; C. Harding Walker (D) from January 13, 1915
- Party control: Democratic Party

Virginia House of Delegates
- Members: 100 delegates
- Speaker: Edwin P. Cox (D)
- Party control: Democratic Party

Sessions
- 1st: January 14, 1914 – March 20, 1914
- 2nd: January 13, 1915 – March 19, 1915

The 108th Virginia General Assembly was the meeting of the legislative power of the Virginia from 1914 to 1916, after the 1913 Virginia state elections. It convened in Richmond for two sessions.

== Party summary ==
Resignations and new members are discussed in the "Changes in membership" section, below.

=== Senate ===
	Party (Shading indicates majority caucus)			Total	Vacant
	Democratic	Independent	Republican	Total	Vacant
End of previous session	33	0	5	39	1
Begin	35	0	5	40	0
April 8, 1914	34	0	5	39	1
April 13, 1914	33	0	5	38	2
June 25, 1914	32	0	5	37	3
December 19, 1914	31	0	5	36	4
January 13, 1915	34	0	5	39	1
January 23, 1915	35	0	5	40	0
Latest voting share	88%	13%			
Beginning of next session	35	1	4	40	0

== Senate ==
=== Leadership ===
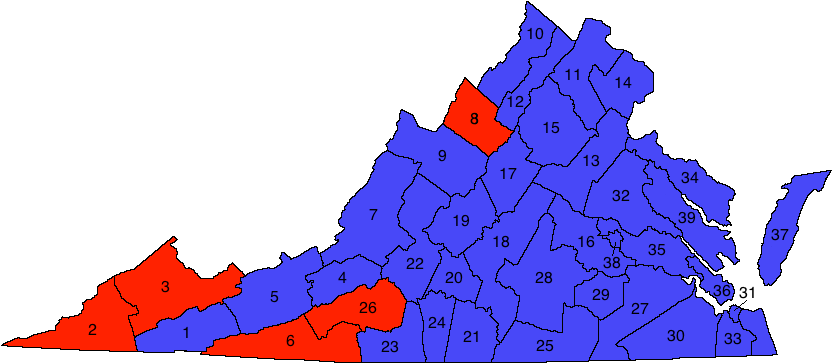
Map of Virginia's senatorial districts as they were in 1914

Office	Officer
President of the Senate	J. Taylor Ellyson (D)
President pro tempore	Edward Echols (D) until December 19, 1914
President pro tempore	C. Harding Walker (D) from January 13, 1915
Majority Floor Leader	Saxon W. Holt (D)
Minority Floor Leader	Edmund Parr (R)

=== Members ===
District	Senator	Party	Constituency	Began serving
1st	Benjamin F. Buchanan	Democratic	Washington, Smyth, and city of Bristol	1914 (previously served 1893-1897)
2nd	John H. Catron	Republican	Scott, Lee, and Wise	1912
3rd	J. Powell Royall	Republican	Buchanan, Dickenson, Russell, and Tazewell	1912
4th	John M. Hart	Democratic	Roanoke, Montgomery, and cities of Roanoke and Radford	1908
5th	Alexander G. Crockett	Democratic	Giles, Bland, Pulaski, and Wythe	1912
6th	Edmund Parr	Republican	Carroll, Grayson, and Patrick	1912 (previously served 1895-1899)
7th	William A. Rinehart	Democratic	Craig, Botetourt, Allegheny, Bath, and city of Clifton Forge	1912
8th	John Paul, Jr.	Republican	Rockingham	1912
9th	Edward Echols	Democratic	Augusta, Highland, and city of Staunton	1906 (previously served 1889-1897)
10th	Frank S. Tavenner	Democratic	Shenandoah, Frederick, and city of Winchester	1912 (previously served 1904-1908)
11th	G. Latham Fletcher	Democratic	Fauquier and Loudoun	1908
12th	R. S. Blackburn Smith	Democratic	Clarke, Page, and Warren	1912
13th	Richard C. L. Moncure	Democratic	Spotsylvania, Stafford, Louisa, and city of Fredericksburg	1912
14th	R. Ewell Thornton	Democratic	Alexandria county, Prince William, Fairfax, and city of Alexandria	1908
15th	Clyde T. Bowers	Democratic	Culpeper, Madison, Rappahannock, and Orange	1912
16th	John B. Watkins	Democratic	Goochland, Powhatan, and Chesterfield	1908
17th	Nathaniel B. Early	Democratic	Albemarle, Greene, and city of Charlottesville	1908
18th	Sands Gayle	Democratic	Appomattox, Buckingham, Fluvanna, and Charlotte	1910
19th	Bland Massie	Democratic	Amherst and Nelson	1912 (previously served 1897-1906)
20th	Howell C. Featherston	Democratic	Campbell and city of Lynchburg	1912
21st	Henry A. Edmondson	Democratic	Halifax	1908
22nd	William T. Paxton	Democratic	Bedford, Rockbridge, and city of Buena Vista	1914
23rd	William A. Garrett	Democratic	Pittsylvania, Henry, and city of Danville	1901
24th	George T. Rison	Democratic	Pittsylvania and city of Danville	1904
25th	William D. Blanks	Democratic	Mecklenburg and Brunswick	1912
26th	Valentine M. Sowder	Republican	Franklin and Floyd	1912
27th	Alexander R. Hobbs	Democratic	Greensville, Sussex, Surry, and Prince George	1901
28th	Robert K. Brock	Democratic	Nottoway, Amelia, Lunenburg, Prince Edward, and Cumberland	1912
29th	Patrick H. Drewry	Democratic	Dinwiddie and city of Petersburg	1912
30th	Junius E. West	Democratic	Isle of Wight, Southampton, and Nansemond	1912
31st	John A. Lesner	Democratic	Norfolk city	1908
32nd	Charles U. Gravatt	Democratic	Caroline, Hanover, and King William	1908
33rd	Samuel T. Montague	Democratic	Norfolk county and city of Portsmouth	1912
34th	C. Harding Walker	Democratic	King George, Richmond, Westmoreland, Lancaster, and Northumberland	1899
35th	Louis O. Wendenburg	Democratic	Henrico, New Kent, Charles City, James City, and city of Williamsburg	1912
36th	Saxon W. Holt	Democratic	Elizabeth City, York, Warwick, and city of Newport News	1904
37th	G. Walter Mapp	Democratic	Accomac, Northampton, and Princess Anne	1912
38th	James E. Cannon	Democratic	Richmond city	1914
38th	Arthur C. Harman	Democratic	Richmond city	1904
39th	John R. Saunders	Democratic	King and Queen, Middlesex, Essex, Gloucester, and Mathews	1908

== Changes in membership ==
=== Senate ===
- April 8, 1914, John M. Hart (D-4th district) resigned to accept appointment as Collector of Internal Revenue for the Western District of Virginia. Replaced by William L. Andrews at start of extra session.
- April 13, 1914, Richard C. L. Moncure (D-13th district) resigned to accept appointment as Collector of Internal Revenue for the Eastern District of Virginia. Replaced by C. O'Conor Goolrick at start of extra session.
- June 25, 1914, Samuel T. Montague (D-33rd district) resigned to become postmaster of Portsmouth. Replaced by William C. Corbitt at start of extra session.
- December 19, 1914, Edward Echols (D-9th district) died. Replaced by William H. Landes at start of extra session.

== House of Delegates ==
=== Leadership ===
Office	Officer
Speaker of the House	Edwin P. Cox (D)
Majority Floor Leader	Martin Williams (D)
Minority Floor Leader	(R)

== See also ==
- List of Virginia state legislatures
