= 106th Virginia General Assembly =

←	105th	107th	→
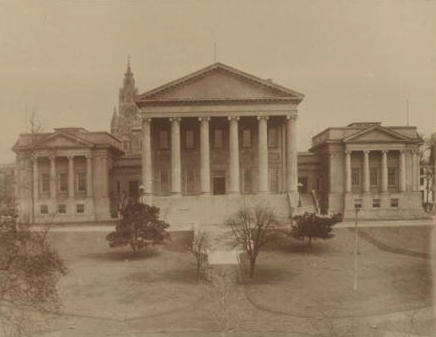
- Virginia State Capitol (1912)

Overview
- Legislative body: Virginia General Assembly
- Jurisdiction: Virginia, United States
- Term: January 12, 1910 – January 10, 1912

Senate of Virginia
- Members: 40 senators
- President: J. Taylor Ellyson (D)
- President pro tempore: Edward Echols (D)
- Party control: Democratic Party

Virginia House of Delegates
- Members: 100 delegates
- Speaker: Richard E. Byrd (D)
- Party control: Democratic Party

Sessions
- 1st: January 12, 1910 – March 17, 1910

The 106th Virginia General Assembly was the meeting of the legislative branch of the Virginia state government from 1910 to 1912, after the 1909 state elections. It convened in Richmond for one session.

== Party summary ==
Resignations and new members are discussed in the "Changes in membership" section, below.

=== Senate ===
	Party (Shading indicates majority caucus)			Total	Vacant
	Democratic	Independent	Republican	Total	Vacant
End of previous session	33	0	6	39	1
Begin	34	0	6	40	0
Latest voting share	85%	15%			
Beginning of next session	35	0	5	40	0

== Senate ==
=== Leadership ===
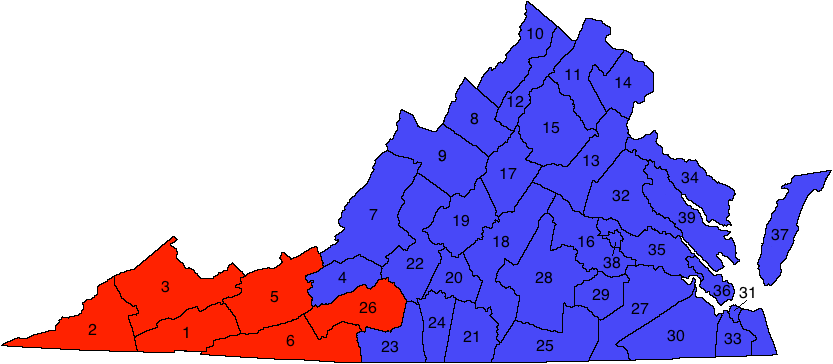
Map of Virginia's senatorial districts as they were in 1910

Office	Officer
President of the Senate	J. Taylor Ellyson (D)
President pro tempore	Edward Echols (D)
Majority Floor Leader	William W. Sale (D)
Minority Floor Leader	John C. Noel (R)

=== Members ===
District	Senator	Party	Constituency	Began serving
1st	Alanson T. Lincoln	Republican	Washington, Smyth, and city of Bristol	1908
2nd	John C. Noel	Republican	Scott, Lee, and Wise	1904
3rd	Roland E. Chase	Republican	Buchanan, Dickenson, Russell, and Tazewell	1908
4th	John M. Hart	Democratic	Roanoke, Montgomery, and cities of Roanoke and Radford	1908
5th	A. Pendleton Strother	Republican	Giles, Bland, Pulaski, and Wythe	1908
6th	John M. Parsons	Republican	Carroll, Grayson, and Patrick	1908
7th	Floyd W. King	Democratic	Craig, Botetourt, Allegheny, Bath, and city of Clifton Forge	1908
8th	George B. Keezell	Republican	Rockingham	1896 (previously served 1884-1887)
9th	Edward Echols	Democratic	Augusta, Highland, and city of Staunton	1906 (previously served 1889-1897)
10th	Robert M. Ward	Democratic	Shenandoah, Frederick, and city of Winchester	1908
11th	G. Latham Fletcher	Democratic	Fauquier and Loudoun	1908
12th	Richard S. Parks	Democratic	Clarke, Page, and Warren	1908
13th	F. Wilmer Sims	Democratic	Spotsylvania, Stafford, Louisa, and city of Fredericksburg	1906
14th	R. Ewell Thornton	Democratic	Alexandria county, Prince William, Fairfax, and city of Alexandria	1908
15th	F. Pendleton Carter	Democratic	Culpeper, Madison, Rappahannock, and Orange	1908
16th	John B. Watkins	Democratic	Goochland, Powhatan, and Chesterfield	1908
17th	Nathaniel B. Early	Democratic	Albemarle, Greene, and city of Charlottesville	1908
18th	Sands Gayle	Democratic	Appomattox, Buckingham, Fluvanna, and Charlotte	1910
19th	Aubrey E. Strode	Democratic	Amherst and Nelson	1906
20th	Don P. Halsey	Democratic	Campbell and city of Lynchburg	1908 (previously served 1902-1904)
21st	Henry A. Edmondson	Democratic	Halifax	1908
22nd	J. Randolph Tucker	Democratic	Bedford, Rockbridge, and city of Buena Vista	1908
23rd	William A. Garrett	Democratic	Pittsylvania, Henry, and city of Danville	1901
24th	George T. Rison	Democratic	Pittsylvania and city of Danville	1904
25th	James D. Elam	Democratic	Mecklenburg and Brunswick	1908 (previously served 1901-1904)
26th	Greenville O. McAlexander	Republican	Franklin and Floyd	1908
27th	Alexander R. Hobbs	Democratic	Greensville, Sussex, Surry, and Prince George	1901
28th	John J. Owen	Democratic	Nottoway, Amelia, Lunenburg, Prince Edward, and Cumberland	1910
29th	Charles T. Lassiter	Democratic	Dinwiddie and city of Petersburg	1906
30th	Edward E. Holland	Democratic	Isle of Wight, Southampton, and Nansemond	1908
31st	William W. Sale	Democratic	Norfolk city	1908
32nd	Charles U. Gravatt	Democratic	Caroline, Hanover, and King William	1908
33rd	John A. Lesner	Democratic	Norfolk county and city of Portsmouth	1908
34th	C. Harding Walker	Democratic	King George, Richmond, Westmoreland, Lancaster, and Northumberland	1899
35th	T. Ashby Wickham	Democratic	Henrico, New Kent, Charles City, James City, and city of Williamsburg	1906
36th	Saxon W. Holt	Democratic	Elizabeth City, York, Warwick, and city of Newport News	1904
37th	Ben T. Gunter	Democratic	Accomac, Northampton, and Princess Anne	1904
38th	Elben C. Folkes	Democratic	Richmond city	1908
38th	Arthur C. Harman	Democratic	Richmond city	1904
39th	John R. Saunders	Democratic	King and Queen, Middlesex, Essex, Gloucester, and Mathews	1908

== See also ==
- List of Virginia state legislatures
