= 111th Virginia General Assembly =

| ← | 110th | 112th | → |
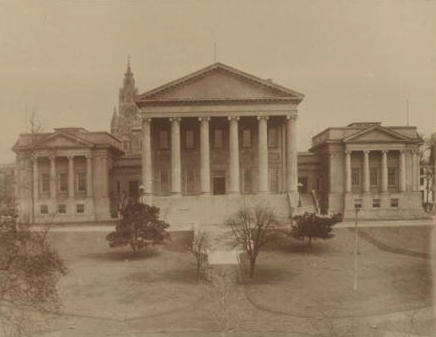
- Virginia State Capitol (1912)

Overview
- Legislative body: Virginia General Assembly
- Jurisdiction: Virginia, United States
- Term: January 14, 1920 – January 11, 1922

Senate of Virginia
- Members: 40 senators
- President: Benjamin F. Buchanan
- President pro tempore: Saxon W. Holt (D)
- Party control: Democratic Party

Virginia House of Delegates
- Members: 100 delegates
- Speaker: Richard L. Brewer Jr. (D)
- Party control: Democratic Party

Sessions
- 1st: January 14, 1920 – March 19, 1920

The 111th Virginia General Assembly was the meeting of the legislative branch of the Virginia state government from 1920 to 1922, after the 1919 state elections. It convened in Richmond for one session.

== Senate ==
=== Leadership ===
| Office | Officer |
|---|---|
| President of the Senate | Benjamin F. Buchanan (D) |
| President pro tempore | Saxon W. Holt (D) |
| Minority Floor Leader | Charles S. Pendleton (R) |

=== Members ===
| District | Senator | Party | Constituency | Began serving |
|---|---|---|---|---|
| 1st | John H. Hassinger | Republican | Washington, Smyth, and city of Bristol | 1920 |
| 2nd | Charles S. Pendleton | Republican | Scott, Lee, and Wise | 1920 |
| 3rd | Robert O. Crockett | Republican | Buchanan, Dickenson, Russell, and Tazewell | 1920 |
| 4th | William L. Andrews | Democratic | Roanoke, Montgomery, and cities of Roanoke and Radford | 1915 |
| 5th | E. Lee Trinkle | Democratic | Giles, Bland, Pulaski, and Wythe | 1916 |
| 6th | John M. Parsons | Republican | Carroll, Grayson, and Patrick | 1920 (previously served 1908-1912) |
| 7th | George W. Layman | Democratic | Craig, Botetourt, Allegheny, Bath, and city of Clifton Forge | 1920 |
| 8th | John Paul, Jr. | Republican | Rockingham | 1920 (previously served 1912-1916) |
| 9th | F. Percy Loth | Republican | Augusta, Highland, and city of Staunton | 1920 |
| 10th | Harry F. Byrd | Democratic | Shenandoah, Frederick, and city of Winchester | 1916 |
| 11th | J. Bradshaw Beverley | Democratic | Fauquier and Loudoun | 1920 |
| 12th | Robert F. Leedy | Democratic | Clarke, Page, and Warren | 1919 |
| 13th | C. O'Conor Goolrick | Democratic | Spotsylvania, Stafford, Louisa, and city of Fredericksburg | 1915 |
| 14th | Walter T. Oliver | Democratic | Alexandria county, Prince William, Fairfax, and city of Alexandria | 1920 |
| 15th | John J. Miller | Democratic | Culpeper, Madison, Rappahannock, and Orange | 1920 |
| 16th | Thomas S. Hening | Democratic | Goochland, Powhatan, and Chesterfield | 1916 |
| 17th | Nathaniel B. Early | Democratic | Albemarle, Greene, and city of Charlottesville | 1908 |
| 18th | Samuel L. Ferguson | Democratic | Appomattox, Buckingham, Fluvanna, and Charlotte | 1919 |
| 19th | J. Belmont Woodson | Democratic | Amherst and Nelson | 1916 (previously served 1906-1912) |
| 20th | Robert A. Russell | Democratic | Campbell and city of Lynchburg | 1920 |
| 21st | Marshall B. Booker | Democratic | Halifax | 1919 |
| 22nd | A. Willis Robertson | Democratic | Bedford, Rockbridge, and city of Buena Vista | 1916 |
| 23rd | William A. Garrett | Democratic | Pittsylvania, Henry, and city of Danville | 1901 |
| 24th | George T. Rison | Democratic | Pittsylvania and city of Danville | 1904 |
| 25th | William H. Jeffreys, Jr. | Democratic | Mecklenburg and Brunswick | 1916 |
| 26th | Samuel G. Proffit | Democratic | Franklin and Floyd | 1920 |
| 27th | William B. Cocke | Democratic | Greensville, Sussex, Surry, and Prince George | 1920 |
| 28th | Louis S. Epes | Democratic | Nottoway, Amelia, Lunenburg, Prince Edward, and Cumberland | 1920 |
| 29th | Patrick H. Drewry | Democratic | Dinwiddie and city of Petersburg | 1912 |
| 30th | Junius E. West | Democratic | Isle of Wight, Southampton, and Nansemond | 1912 |
| 31st | Joseph T. Deal | Democratic | Norfolk city | 1920 |
| 32nd | Charles U. Gravatt | Democratic | Caroline, Hanover, and King William | 1908 |
| 33rd | William C. Corbitt | Democratic | Norfolk county and city of Portsmouth | 1915 |
| 34th | Thomas J. Downing | Democratic | King George, Richmond, Westmoreland, Lancaster, and Northumberland | 1920 |
| 35th | Julien Gunn | Democratic | Henrico, New Kent, Charles City, James City, and city of Williamsburg | 1916 |
| 36th | Saxon W. Holt | Democratic | Elizabeth City, York, Warwick, and city of Newport News | 1904 |
| 37th | G. Walter Mapp | Democratic | Accomac, Northampton, and Princess Anne | 1912 |
| 38th | James E. Cannon | Democratic | Richmond city | 1914 |
| 38th | Morgan R. Mills | Democratic | Richmond city | 1920 |
| 39th | J. Douglas Mitchell | Democratic | King and Queen, Middlesex, Essex, Gloucester, and Mathews | 1918 |

== House of Delegates ==
=== Leadership ===
| Office | Officer |
|---|---|
| Speaker of the House | Richard L. Brewer Jr. (D) |
| Majority Floor Leader | R. Holman Willis (D) |
| Minority Floor Leader | Robert A. Anderson (R) |

== See also ==
- List of Virginia state legislatures
