= 105th Virginia General Assembly =

| ← | 104th | 106th | → |
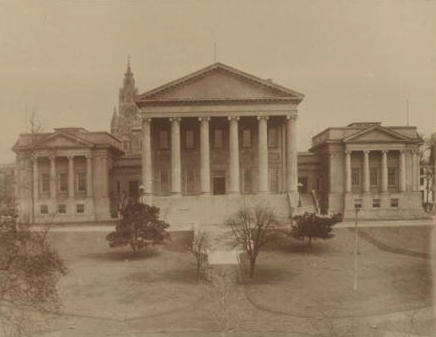
- Virginia State Capitol (1912)

Overview
- Legislative body: Virginia General Assembly
- Jurisdiction: Virginia, United States
- Term: January 8, 1908 – January 12, 1910

Senate of Virginia
- Members: 40 senators
- President: J. Taylor Ellyson (D)
- President pro tempore: Edward Echols (D)
- Party control: Democratic Party

Virginia House of Delegates
- Members: 100 delegates
- Speaker: Richard E. Byrd (D)
- Party control: Democratic Party

Sessions
- 1st: January 8, 1908 – March 27, 1908

The 105th Virginia General Assembly was the meeting of the legislative branch of the Virginia state government from 1908 to 1910, after the 1907 state elections. It convened in Richmond for one session.

== Party summary ==
Resignations and new members are discussed in the "Changes in membership" section, below.

=== Senate ===
| | Party (Shading indicates majority caucus) | | | Total | Vacant |
| | Democratic | Independent | Republican | Total | Vacant |
|---|---|---|---|---|---|
| End of previous session | - | - | - | - | - |
| Begin | 34 | 0 | 6 | 40 | 0 |
| August 4, 1909 | 33 | 0 | 6 | 39 | 1 |
| Latest voting share | 84.6% | 15.4% | | | |
| Beginning of next session | 34 | 0 | 6 | 40 | 0 |

== Senate ==
=== Leadership ===
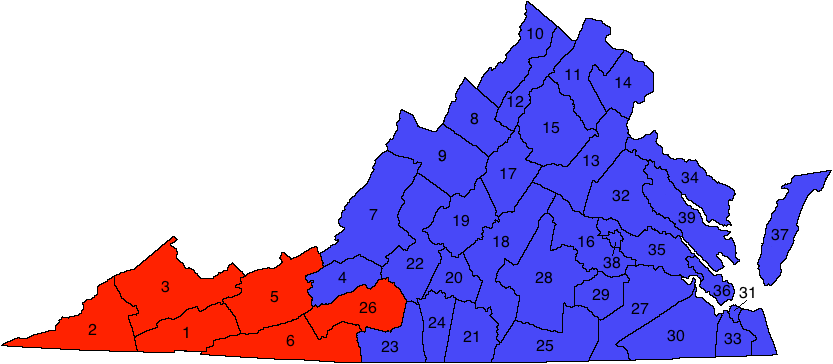
Map of Virginia's senatorial districts as they were in 1908

| Office | Officer |
|---|---|
| President of the Senate | J. Taylor Ellyson (D) |
| President pro tempore | Edward Echols (D) |
| Majority Floor Leader | William W. Sale (D) |
| Minority Floor Leader | John C. Noel (R) |

=== Members ===
| District | Senator | Party | Constituency | Began serving |
|---|---|---|---|---|
| 1st | Alanson T. Lincoln | Republican | Washington, Smyth, and city of Bristol | 1908 |
| 2nd | John C. Noel | Republican | Scott, Lee, and Wise | 1904 |
| 3rd | Roland E. Chase | Republican | Buchanan, Dickenson, Russell, and Tazewell | 1908 |
| 4th | John M. Hart | Democratic | Roanoke, Montgomery, and cities of Roanoke and Radford | 1908 |
| 5th | A. Pendleton Strother | Republican | Giles, Bland, Pulaski, and Wythe | 1908 |
| 6th | John M. Parsons | Republican | Carroll, Grayson, and Patrick | 1908 |
| 7th | Floyd W. King | Democratic | Craig, Botetourt, Allegheny, Bath, and city of Clifton Forge | 1908 |
| 8th | George B. Keezell | Democratic | Rockingham | 1896 (previously served 1884–1887) |
| 9th | Edward Echols | Democratic | Augusta, Highland, and city of Staunton | 1906 (previously served 1889–1897) |
| 10th | Robert M. Ward | Democratic | Shenandoah, Frederick, and city of Winchester | 1908 |
| 11th | G. Latham Fletcher | Democratic | Fauquier and Loudoun | 1908 |
| 12th | Richard S. Parks | Democratic | Clarke, Page, and Warren | 1908 |
| 13th | F. Wilmer Sims | Democratic | Spotsylvania, Stafford, Louisa, and city of Fredericksburg | 1906 |
| 14th | R. Ewell Thornton | Democratic | Alexandria county, Prince William, Fairfax, and city of Alexandria | 1908 |
| 15th | F. Pendleton Carter | Democratic | Culpeper, Madison, Rappahannock, and Orange | 1908 |
| 16th | John B. Watkins | Democratic | Goochland, Powhatan, and Chesterfield | 1908 |
| 17th | Nathaniel B. Early | Democratic | Albemarle, Greene, and city of Charlottesville | 1908 |
| 18th | William C. White | Democratic | Appomattox, Buckingham, Fluvanna, and Charlotte | 1908 |
| 19th | Aubrey E. Strode | Democratic | Amherst and Nelson | 1906 |
| 20th | Don P. Halsey | Democratic | Campbell and city of Lynchburg | 1908 (previously served 1902–1904) |
| 21st | Henry A. Edmondson | Democratic | Halifax | 1908 |
| 22nd | J. Randolph Tucker | Democratic | Bedford, Rockbridge, and city of Buena Vista | 1908 |
| 23rd | William A. Garrett | Democratic | Pittsylvania, Henry, and city of Danville | 1901 |
| 24th | George T. Rison | Democratic | Pittsylvania and city of Danville | 1904 |
| 25th | James D. Elam | Democratic | Mecklenburg and Brunswick | 1908 (previously served 1901–1904) |
| 26th | Greenville O. McAlexander | Republican | Franklin and Floyd | 1908 |
| 27th | Alexander R. Hobbs | Democratic | Greensville, Sussex, Surry, and Prince George | 1901 |
| 28th | William Hodges Mann | Democratic | Nottoway, Amelia, Lunenburg, Prince Edward, and Cumberland | 1899 |
| 29th | Charles T. Lassiter | Democratic | Dinwiddie and city of Petersburg | 1906 |
| 30th | Edward E. Holland | Democratic | Isle of Wight, Southampton, and Nansemond | 1908 |
| 31st | William W. Sale | Democratic | Norfolk city | 1901 |
| 32nd | Charles U. Gravatt | Democratic | Caroline, Hanover, and King William | 1908 |
| 33rd | John A. Lesner | Democratic | Norfolk county and city of Portsmouth | 1908 |
| 34th | C. Harding Walker | Democratic | King George, Richmond, Westmoreland, Lancaster, and Northumberland | 1899 |
| 35th | T. Ashby Wickham | Democratic | Henrico, New Kent, Charles City, James City, and city of Williamsburg | 1906 |
| 36th | Saxon W. Holt | Democratic | Elizabeth City, York, Warwick, and city of Newport News | 1904 |
| 37th | Ben T. Gunter | Democratic | Accomac, Northampton, and Princess Anne | 1904 |
| 38th | Elben C. Folkes | Democratic | Richmond city | 1908 |
| 38th | Arthur C. Harman | Democratic | Richmond city | 1904 |
| 39th | John R. Saunders | Democratic | King and Queen, Middlesex, Essex, Gloucester, and Mathews | 1908 |

== Changes in membership ==
=== Senate ===
- August 4, 1909, William C. White (D-18th district) dies. His seat remained unfilled until the next regular session.

== See also ==
- List of Virginia state legislatures
