= 102nd Virginia General Assembly =

←	101st	103rd	→
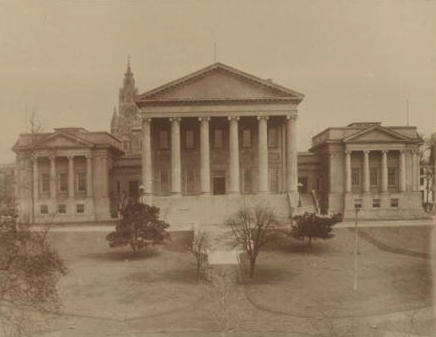
- Virginia State Capitol (1912)

Overview
- Legislative body: Virginia General Assembly
- Jurisdiction: Virginia, United States
- Term: December 4, 1901 – January 13, 1904

Senate of Virginia
- Members: 40 senators
- President: Joseph E. Willard (D)
- President pro tempore: Henry T. Wickham (D)
- Party control: Democratic Party

Virginia House of Delegates
- Members: 100 delegates
- Speaker: John F. Ryan (D)
- Party control: Democratic Party

Sessions
- 1st: December 4, 1901 – April 2, 1902
- 2nd: July 15, 1902 – July 28, 1902
- 3rd: November 12, 1902 – May 19, 1903
- 4th: November 10, 1903 – January 12, 1904

The 102nd Virginia General Assembly was the meeting of the legislative branch of the Virginia state government from 1901 to 1904, after the 1901 state elections. It convened in Richmond for four sessions.

== Senate ==
=== Members ===
District	Senator	Party	Constituency	Began serving
1st	J. Cloyd Byars	Republican	Washington, Smyth, and city of Bristol	1901
2nd	Robert P. Bruce	Democratic	Scott, Lee, and Wise	1899
3rd	John N. Harman	Republican	Buchanan, Dickenson, Russell, and Tazewell	1901
4th	Edward Lyle	Democratic	Montgomery, Roanoke, Craig, and city of Roanoke	1899
5th	Peyton F. St. Clair	Democratic	Giles, Bland, Pulaski, and Wythe	1901
6th	Edwin J. Harvey	Democratic	Carroll, Grayson, and Patrick	1899
7th	George A. Revercomb	Republican	Rockbridge, Botetourt, Allegheny, Bath, and Highland	1901
8th	George B. Keezell	Democratic	Rockingham	1896 (previously served 1884-1887)
9th	John N. Opie	Democratic	Augusta and city of Staunton	1897
10th	Silas L. Lupton	Democratic	Frederick and Shenandoah	1899
11th	George T. Ford	Democratic	Fauquier and Loudoun	1901
12th	Thomas D. Gold	Democratic	Clarke, Page, and Warren	1899
13th	Gustavus M. Wallace	Democratic	Spotsylvania, Stafford, Louisa, and city of Fredericksburg	1897
14th	Stephen R. Donohoe	Democratic	Alexandria, Fairfax, Prince William, and city of Alexandria	1899
15th	George S. Shackelford	Democratic	Culpeper, Rappahannock, Madison, and Orange	1901
16th	Philip V. Cogbill	Democratic	Powhatan, Goochland, and Chesterfield	1899
17th	John S. Chapman	Democratic	Albemarle, Greene, and city of Charlottesville	1901
18th	Frank C. Moon	Democratic	Buckingham, Fluvanna, and Appomattox	1901
19th	Bland Massie	Democratic	Amherst and Nelson	1897
20th	Carter Glass	Democratic	Campbell and city of Lynchburg	1899
21st	William P. Barksdale	Democratic	Halifax	1897
22nd	Graham Claytor	Democratic	Bedford	1899
23rd	William A. Garrett	Democratic	Pittsylvania, Henry, and city of Danville	1901
24th	Joseph Whitehead	Democratic	Pittsylvania and city of Danville	1899
25th	James N. Hutcheson	Democratic	Charlotte and Mecklenburg	1901
26th	James A. Dinwiddie	Republican	Floyd and Franklin	1899
27th	Alexander R. Hobbs	Democratic	Greensville, Sussex, Surry, and Prince George	1901
28th	William Hodges Mann	Democratic	Lunenburg, Nottoway, and Brunswick	1899
29th	William B. McIlwaine	Democratic	Dinwiddie and city of Petersburg	1893
30th	Asa D. Watkins	Democratic	Amelia, Cumberland, and Prince Edward	1899
31st	William W. Sale	Democratic	Norfolk city and Princess Anne	1901
32nd	William Shands	Democratic	Southampton, Isle of Wight, and Nansemond	1899
33rd	E. Finley Cromwell	Democratic	Portsmouth and Norfolk county	1901
34th	Henry T. Wickham	Democratic	Hanover and Caroline	1889
35th	George Wayne Anderson	Democratic	Henrico and city of Richmond	1901
35th	Julian Bryant	Democratic	Henrico and city of Richmond	1901
36th	C. Harding Walker	Democratic	King George, Richmond, Westmoreland, Northumberland, and Lancaster	1899
37th	George W. LeCato	Democratic	Accomac and Northampton	1893
38th	D. Gardiner Tyler	Democratic	Elizabeth City, Warwick, York, James City, Charles City, New Kent, King William, and cities of Williamsburg and Newport News	1899 (previously served 1891-1893)
39th	J. Boyd Sears	Democratic	King and Queen, Middlesex, Gloucester, Essex, and Mathews	1901

== Changes in membership ==
=== Senate ===
- November 4, 1902, Carter Glass (D-20th district) resigned. He was succeeded by Don P. Halsey.
- March 12, 1903, George W. LeCato (D-37th district) died. He was succeeded by Ben T. Gunter.

== See also ==
- List of Virginia state legislatures
