= Senator Bowers =

Senator Bowers may refer to:

- Clyde T. Bowers (1881–1968), Virginia State Senate
- Eaton J. Bowers (1865–1939), Mississippi State Senate
- Elaine Bowers (born 1963), Kansas State Senate
- Jack E. Bowers (1925–2007), Illinois State Senate
- Kathryn I. Bowers (1943–2015), Tennessee State Senate
- William W. Bowers (1834–1917), California State Senate
