= Senator Halsey =

Senator Halsey may refer to:

- Don P. Halsey (1870–1938), Virginia State Senate
- Hugh Halsey (1794–1858), New York State Senate
- Jehiel H. Halsey (1788–1867), New York State Senate
- Silas Halsey (1743–1832), New York State Senate
