= Senator Mapp =

Senator Mapp may refer to:

- G. Walter Mapp (1873–1941), Virginia State Senate
- Kenneth Mapp (born 1955), Senate of the U.S. Virgin Islands
