= President pro tempore of the Virginia Senate =

Position in the Virginia Senate

President pro tempore of the Senate of Virginia
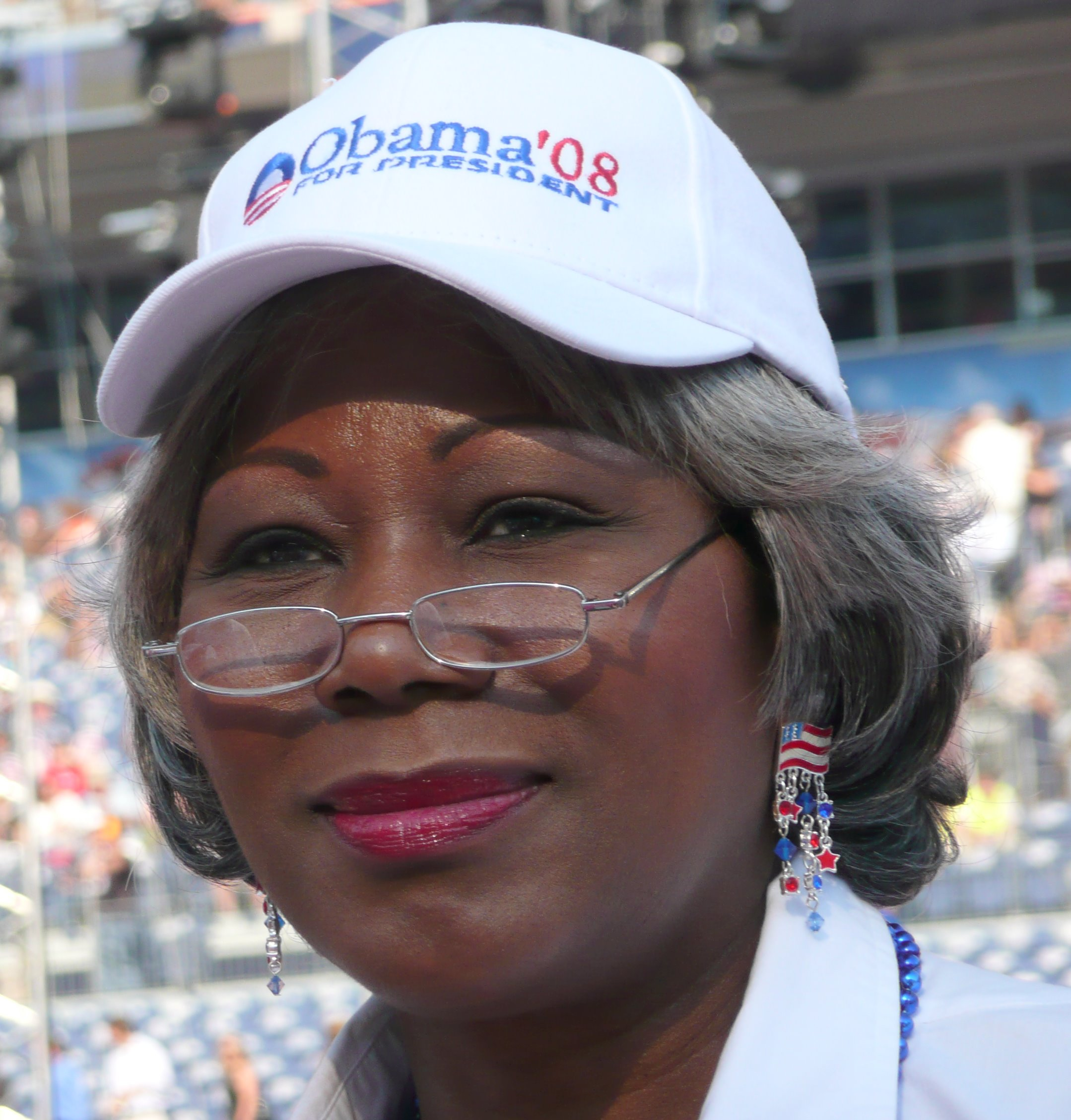
- Incumbent; L. Louise Lucas since January 8, 2020
- Virginia Senate
- Seat: State Senate Chamber, Virginia State Capitol, Richmond, Virginia
- Appointer: Virginia Senate
- Term length: At the pleasure of the Senate, and until another is elected or their term of office as a senator expires
- Constituting instrument: Constitution of the Commonwealth of Virginia
- Formation: January 12, 1851
- First holder: George E. Deneale

The President pro tempore of the Senate of Virginia is a Virginia constitutional office whose role is to serve as the presiding officer of the Senate of Virginia in the absence of the Lieutenant Governor, who ordinarily serves as presiding officer in their role as president of the Senate. The office is established in Article IV, Section 7 of the Constitution of Virginia. The current office holder is L. Louise Lucas.

== Formation ==
A president pro tempore is not mentioned as an officer of the Senate in the 1776 or 1830 Virginia constitutions, the first mention of the office was in the 1851 Virginia constitution, and appeared in the subsequent 1864, 1870, 1902, and 1971 constitutions of Virginia.

== List of presidents pro tempore ==
Assembly	President pro tem.	Party	District	Term start	Term end
1852–1853	George E. Deneale	Democratic		1852	1857
1853–1854	George E. Deneale	Democratic		1852	1857
1855–1856	George E. Deneale	Democratic		1852	1857
1857–1858	William Marshall Ambler	Democratic		1858	1858
1861–1863	James Foote Johnson	Democratic		1861	1865
1863–1865	James Foote Johnson	Democratic		1861	1865
1869–1871	Joseph A. Waddell	Democratic		March 24, 1870	December 6, 1871
1871–1873	Henry Wirtz Thomas	Democratic		December 6, 1871	February 26, 1875
1874–1875	Henry Wirtz Thomas	Democratic		December 6, 1871	February 26, 1875
1875–1877	William D. Quesenberry	Democratic		February 26, 1875	December 3, 1879
1877–1879	William D. Quesenberry	Democratic		February 26, 1875	December 3, 1879
1879–1880	Wyatt M. Elliott	Readjuster	16th	December 3, 1879	January 27, 1882
1881–1882	Wyatt M. Elliott	Readjuster	16th	December 3, 1879	January 27, 1882
1881–1882	Henry Clinton Wood	Readjuster		January 27, 1882	December 5, 1883
1883–1884	John L. Hurt	Democratic	24th	December 5, 1883	December 4, 1895
1885–1887	John L. Hurt	Democratic	24th	December 5, 1883	December 4, 1895
1887–1888	John L. Hurt	Democratic	24th	December 5, 1883	December 4, 1895
1889–1890	John L. Hurt	Democratic	24th	December 5, 1883	December 4, 1895
1891–1892	John L. Hurt	Democratic	24th	December 5, 1883	December 4, 1895
1893–1894	John L. Hurt	Democratic	24th	December 5, 1883	December 4, 1895
1895–1896	William Lovenstein	Democratic	35th	December 4, 1895	December 26, 1896
1897–1898	Henry T. Wickham	Democratic	34th	December 1, 1897	January 8, 1908
1899–1900	Henry T. Wickham	Democratic	34th	December 1, 1897	January 8, 1908
1901	Henry T. Wickham	Democratic	34th	December 1, 1897	January 8, 1908
1901–1904	Henry T. Wickham	Democratic	34th	December 1, 1897	January 8, 1908
1904	Henry T. Wickham	Democratic	32nd	December 1, 1897	January 8, 1908
1906	Henry T. Wickham	Democratic	32nd	December 1, 1897	January 8, 1908
1908–1909	Edward Echols	Democratic	9th	January 8, 1908	December 19, 1914
1910–1911	Edward Echols	Democratic	9th	January 8, 1908	December 19, 1914
1912–1913	Edward Echols	Democratic	9th	January 8, 1908	December 19, 1914
1914–1915	Edward Echols	Democratic	9th	January 8, 1908	December 19, 1914
1914–1915	C. Harding Walker	Democratic	34th	January 13, 1915	January 14, 1920
1916–1917	C. Harding Walker	Democratic	34th	January 13, 1915	January 14, 1920
1918–1919	C. Harding Walker	Democratic	34th	January 13, 1915	January 14, 1920
1920–1921	Saxon W. Holt	Democratic	36th	January 14, 1920	January 12, 1938
1922–1923	Saxon W. Holt	Democratic	36th	January 14, 1920	January 12, 1938
1924–1925	Saxon W. Holt	Democratic	34th	January 14, 1920	January 12, 1938
1926–1927	Saxon W. Holt	Democratic	34th	January 14, 1920	January 12, 1938
1928–1929	Saxon W. Holt	Democratic	34th	January 14, 1920	January 12, 1938
1930–1931	Saxon W. Holt	Democratic	34th	January 14, 1920	January 12, 1938
1932–1933	Saxon W. Holt	Democratic	34th	January 14, 1920	January 12, 1938
1934–1935	Saxon W. Holt	Democratic	34th	January 14, 1920	January 12, 1938
1936–1937	Saxon W. Holt	Democratic	33rd	January 14, 1920	January 12, 1938
1938–1939	Henry T. Wickham	Democratic	31st	January 12, 1938	March 5, 1943
1940–1941	Henry T. Wickham	Democratic	31st	January 12, 1938	March 5, 1943
1942–1943	Henry T. Wickham	Democratic	31st	January 12, 1938	March 5, 1943
1944–1945	Robert O. Norris Jr.	Democratic	30th	January 10, 1945	January 11, 1950
1946–1947	Robert O. Norris Jr.	Democratic	30th	January 10, 1945	January 11, 1950
1948–1949	Robert O. Norris Jr.	Democratic	30th	January 10, 1945	January 11, 1950
1950–1951	Morton G. Goode	Democratic	8th	January 11, 1950	January 9, 1952
1952–1953	Robert C. Vaden	Democratic	13th	January 9, 1952	January 13, 1954
1954–1955	Walter C. Caudill	Democratic	19th	January 13, 1954	January 11, 1956
1956–1957	Charles T. Moses	Democratic	11th	January 11, 1956	November 17, 1964
1958–1959	Charles T. Moses	Democratic	11th	January 11, 1956	November 17, 1964
1960–1961	Charles T. Moses	Democratic	11th	January 11, 1956	November 17, 1964
1962–1963	Charles T. Moses	Democratic	11th	January 11, 1956	November 17, 1964
1964–1965	Charles T. Moses	Democratic	11th	January 11, 1956	November 17, 1964
1966–1967	James D. Hagood	Democratic	4th	January 12, 1966	January 12, 1972
1968–1969	James D. Hagood	Democratic	4th	January 12, 1966	January 12, 1972
1970–1971	James D. Hagood	Democratic	4th	January 12, 1966	January 12, 1972
1972–1973	Edward E. Willey	Democratic	10th	January 12, 1972	July 17, 1986
1974–1975	Edward E. Willey	Democratic	10th	January 12, 1972	July 17, 1986
1976–1977	Edward E. Willey	Democratic	10th	January 12, 1972	July 17, 1986
1978–1979	Edward E. Willey	Democratic	10th	January 12, 1972	July 17, 1986
1980–1981	Edward E. Willey	Democratic	10th	January 12, 1972	July 17, 1986
1982–1983	Edward E. Willey	Democratic	10th	January 12, 1972	July 17, 1986
1984–1985	Edward E. Willey	Democratic	10th	January 12, 1972	July 17, 1986
1986–1987	Edward E. Willey	Democratic	10th	January 12, 1972	July 17, 1986
1986–1987	William F. Parkerson Jr.	Democratic	12th	July 18, 1986	January 13, 1988
1988–1989	Stanley C. Walker	Democratic	6th	January 13, 1988	January 12, 2000
1990–1991	Stanley C. Walker	Democratic	6th	January 13, 1988	January 12, 2000
1992–1993	Stanley C. Walker	Democratic	6th	January 13, 1988	January 12, 2000
1994–1995	Stanley C. Walker	Democratic	6th	January 13, 1988	January 12, 2000
1996–1997	Stanley C. Walker	Democratic	6th	January 13, 1988	January 12, 2000
1998–1999	Stanley C. Walker	Democratic	6th	January 13, 1988	January 12, 2000
2000–2001	John H. Chichester	Republican	28th	January 12, 2000	January 9, 2008
2002–2003	John H. Chichester	Republican	28th	January 12, 2000	January 9, 2008
2004–2005	John H. Chichester	Republican	28th	January 12, 2000	January 9, 2008
2006–2007	John H. Chichester	Republican	28th	January 12, 2000	January 9, 2008
2008–2009	Charles J. Colgan	Democratic	29th	January 9, 2008	January 11, 2012
2010–2011	Charles J. Colgan	Democratic	29th	January 9, 2008	January 11, 2012
2012–2013	Walter Stosch	Republican	12th	January 12, 2012	January 28, 2014
2014–2016	Charles J. Colgan	Democratic	29th	January 29, 2014	June 23, 2014
2014–2016	Walter Stosch	Republican	12th	June 23, 2014	January 13, 2016
2016–2018	Stephen Newman	Republican	23rd	January 13, 2016	January 8, 2019
2018–2020	Stephen Newman	Republican	23rd	January 13, 2016	January 8, 2019
2020–2022	L. Louise Lucas	Democratic	18th	January 8, 2020	(incumbent)
2022–2024	L. Louise Lucas	Democratic	18th	January 8, 2020	(incumbent)
2024–2026	L. Louise Lucas	Democratic	18th	January 8, 2020	(incumbent)

== See also ==
- List of Virginia state legislatures
