= Granville Swift =

Granville Swift may refer to:

- Granville P. Swift (1821–1875), California pioneer
- Granville R. Swift (1870–1949), Virginia politician
