= Marion K. Lowry =

American politician (1854–1939)

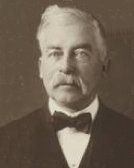

Member of the Virginia House of Delegates for Stafford and King George
- In office January 12, 1916 – January 9, 1918
- Preceded by: James O. Heflin
- Succeeded by: Thomas Lomax Hunter
- In office December 4, 1901 – January 10, 1906
- Preceded by: Henry T. Garnett
- Succeeded by: Richard C. L. Moncure

Personal details
- Born: Marion King Lowry; March 31, 1854 Stafford County, Virginia, U.S.
- Died: June 26, 1939 (aged 85) Richmond, Virginia, U.S.
- Resting place: Hollywood Cemetery
- Party: Republican
- Spouse: Alelia Pollard

Marion King Lowry (March 31, 1854 – June 26, 1939) was a Virginia politician. He served as a Republican in the Virginia House of Delegates.

== Early life ==
Marion King Lowry was born at Brooke Station in Stafford County, Virginia, to Alsie (née Beagle) and James Lewis Lowry.

== Career ==
Lowry was elected as a member of the Virginia House of Delegates in 1901. In 1905, he was appointed collector of the internal revenue for the second district. He remained in that role until 1915. He was elected again to the House of Delegates in 1916 and served four terms. He presented a bill on roads in Virginia in 1901. After politics, he worked in real estate.

== Personal life ==
Lowry married Alelia Pollard. They had a son, H. L. He died on June 26, 1939, at Murphy's Hotel in Richmond. He was buried in Hollywood Cemetery.

Virginia House of Delegates
Preceded by Henry T. Garnett	Virginia Delegate for Stafford and King George; 1901–1906; 1916–1918	Succeeded by Richard C. L. Moncure
Preceded by James O. Heflin	Virginia Delegate for Stafford and King George; 1901–1906; 1916–1918	Succeeded by Thomas Lomax Hunter
Preceded by Unknown	House Minority Leader; 1916–1918	Succeeded by Roland E. Chase
