= Robert P. Bruce =

American politician

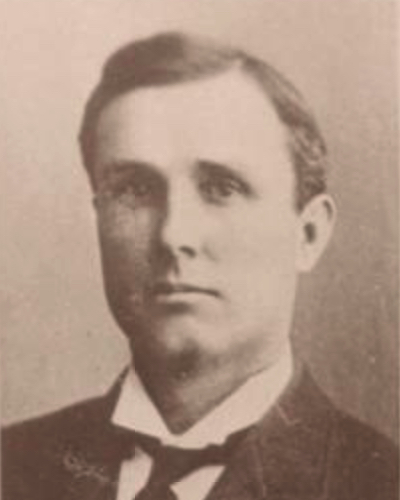

Member of the Virginia Senate from the 2nd district
- In office December 6, 1899 – January 13, 1904
- Preceded by: Henry S. Kane
- Succeeded by: John C. Noel

Personal details
- Born: Robert Patton Bruce; January 24, 1862
- Died: May 2, 1949 (aged 87)
- Party: Democratic
- Spouse: Louvenia Patton

Robert Patton Bruce (January 24, 1862 – May 2, 1949) was an American politician who served as a member of the Virginia Senate.

Senate of Virginia
Preceded by Henry S. Kane	Virginia Senator for the 1st District; 1899–1904	Succeeded by John C. Noel
