= S. L. Ferguson =

American lawyer, newspaper editor and politician (1869–1934)

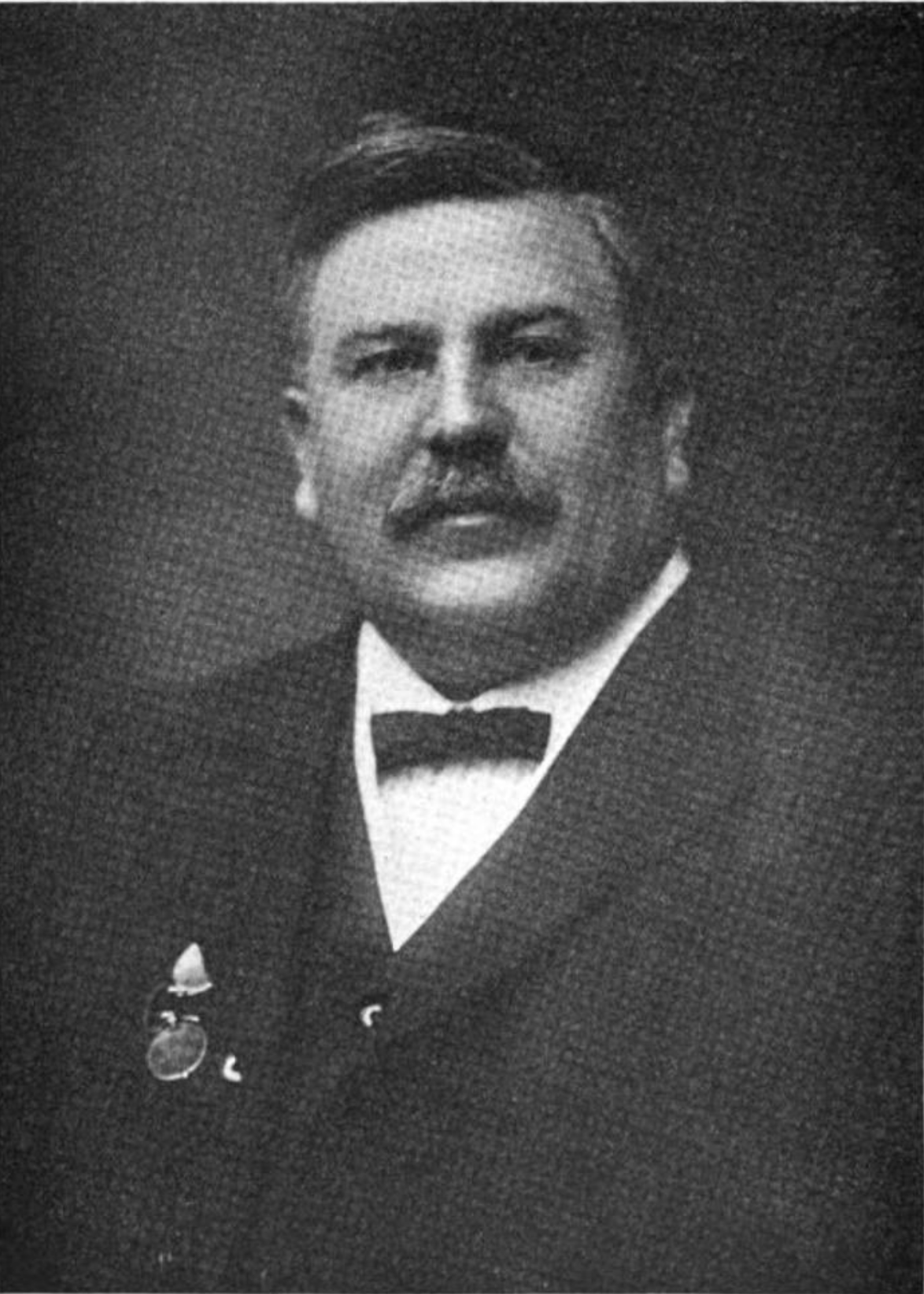
- Ferguson in a 1924 publication

Member of the Virginia Senate
- In office August 14, 1919 – July 30, 1934
- Preceded by: Sands Gayle
- Succeeded by: Charles T. Moses
- Constituency: 18th district (1919‍–‍1924); 11th district (1924‍–‍1934)

Commonwealth's Attorney for Appomattox County
- In office February 7, 1901 – August 14, 1919
- Preceded by: Henry D. Flood
- Succeeded by: Joel W. Flood

Personal details
- Born: Samuel Lewis Ferguson; October 18, 1869 Appomattox, Virginia, U.S.
- Died: July 30, 1934 (aged 64) Appomattox, Virginia, U.S.
- Resting place: Liberty Baptist Cemetery; Appomattox, Virginia, U.S.
- Party: Democratic
- Spouse: Adelia Celestia Mann (m. 1896)
- Children: 5
- Education: University of Virginia (LLB)
- Occupation: Lawyer; newspaper publisher; politician
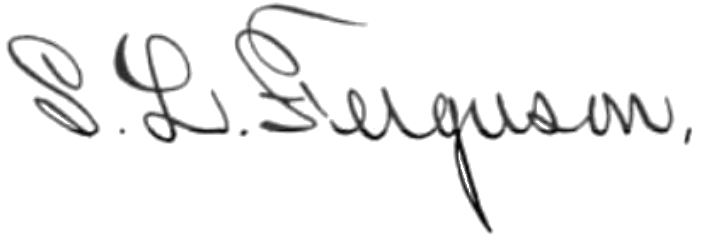
- Signature

Samuel Lewis Ferguson (October 18, 1869 – July 30, 1934) was an American lawyer, newspaper publisher and Democratic politician who served as a member of the Virginia Senate, representing the state's 18th district.

== Early life ==
Samuel Lewis Ferguson was born on October 18, 1869, in Appomattox, Virginia, to Martha Victoria (née Lewis) and George Lafayette Ferguson. His father was a soldier of the 2nd Virginia Cavalry Regiment of the Confederate States Army during the Civil War. He lived on a farm and attended the private school of Colonel R. B. Poore. Ferguson graduated from the University of Virginia School of Law in 1895. While at the University of Virginia, he was the business manager of the university's magazine.

== Career ==
Ferguson left the family farm and moved to Appomattox Court House. He served two years as deputy treasurer and tax collector at the Court House. In 1892, he assisted in establishing the Appomattox and Buckingham Times, the first newspaper of Appomattox County and served as its editor. He later established the Southside Virginian, which later merged with the Richmond Times-Dispatch.

After graduating from the University of Virginia in 1895, Ferguson started a law practice with Henry D. Flood. They practiced together until Flood's death in December 1921. On February 7, 1901, Ferguson was appointed as commonwealth's attorney of Appomattox County after Henry D. Flood resigned. He remained in that position until 1919.

Ferguson was elected to the Virginia Senate in 1919, representing the 18th district. Ferguson remained in the senate until his death. He served as a Democrat.

Ferguson was the director of the Bank of Appomattox. He also served as counsel for the local draft board during World War I.

== Personal life ==
Ferguson married Adelia Celestia Mann of Henrico County in February 1896. He had five children: Samuel Lewis Ferguson Jr., J .D. Ferguson, Mrs. D. B. Henderson, Mrs. N. A. Wagers and Mrs. J. R. Lawson.

Ferguson was the largest landholder of Appomattox County of his time.

== Death ==
Ferguson died on July 30, 1934, of angina in his office at Appomattox, Virginia. He was buried at Liberty Baptist Cemetery in Appomattox.

Senate of Virginia
| Preceded by Sands Gayle | Virginia Senator for the 18th District | Succeeded by |
