= Henry T. Wickham =

American politician

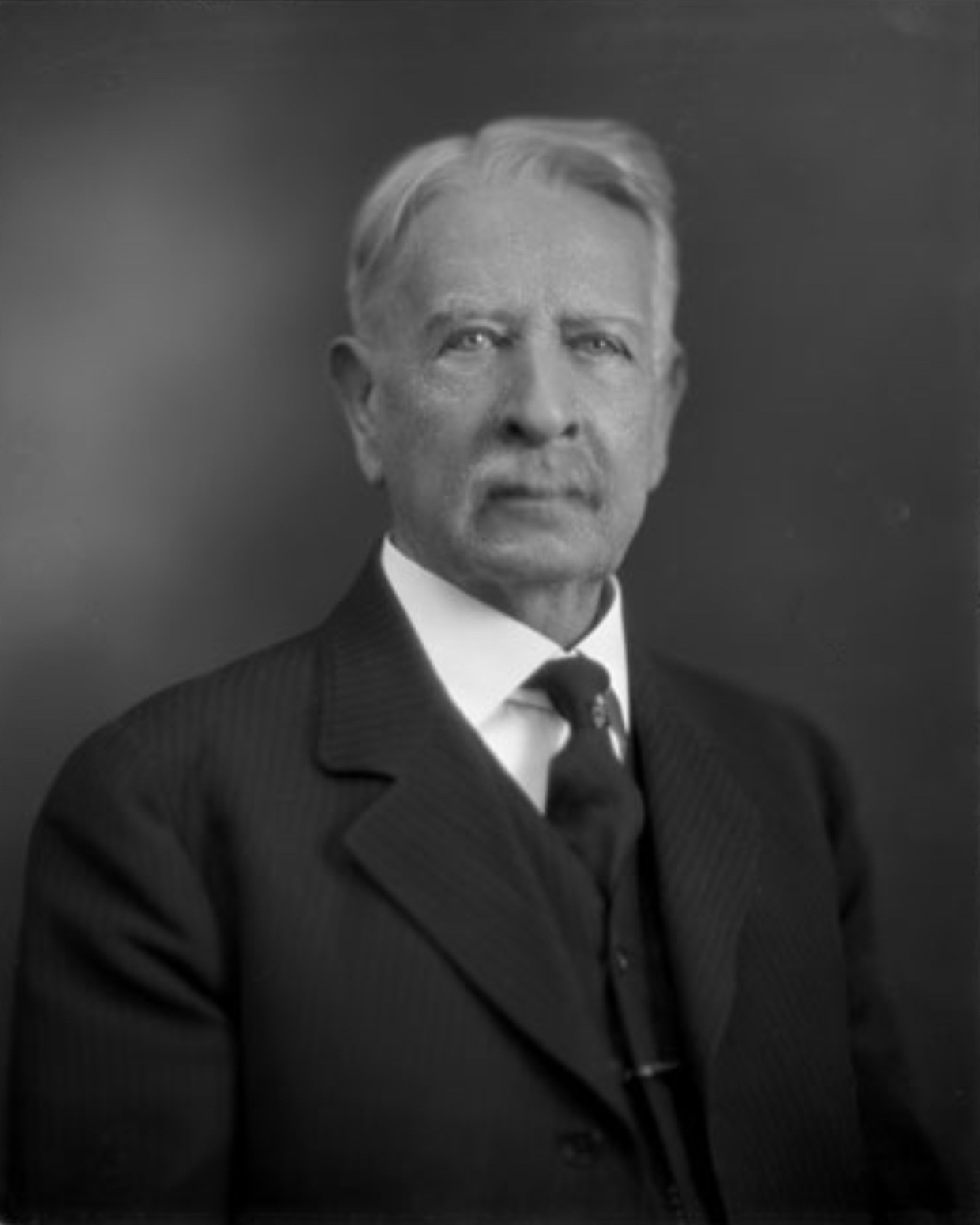
- Portrait of Wickham, 1924

President pro tempore of the Virginia Senate
- In office January 12, 1938 – March 5, 1943
- Preceded by: Saxon W. Holt
- Succeeded by: Robert O. Norris Jr.
- In office December 1, 1897 – January 8, 1908
- Preceded by: William Lovenstein
- Succeeded by: Edward Echols

Member of the Virginia Senate
- In office February 28, 1923 – March 5, 1943
- Preceded by: Charles U. Gravatt
- Succeeded by: Thomas H. Blanton
- Constituency: 32nd district (1923–1936); 31st district (1936–1943)
- In office December 4, 1889 – January 8, 1908
- Preceded by: Williams C. Wickham
- Succeeded by: Charles U. Gravatt
- Constituency: 34th district (1889–1904); 32nd district (1904–1908)

Member of the Virginia House of Delegates from Hanover County
- In office December 3, 1879 – December 7, 1881
- Preceded by: Joseph A. Wingfield; Thomas M. White
- Succeeded by: Richard H. Cardwell

Personal details
- Born: Henry Taylor Wickham; December 17, 1849 Hanover County, Virginia, U.S.
- Died: March 5, 1943 (aged 93) Richmond, Virginia, U.S.
- Party: Democratic
- Spouse: Elise Warwick Barksdale
- Parent: Williams C. Wickham (father)
- Education: Washington College; University of Virginia

Henry Taylor Wickham (December 17, 1849 – March 5, 1943) was an American lawyer and Democratic politician who served as a member of the Virginia House of Delegates (1879–1880), as well as the Virginia Senate (1890 to 1908 and 1923 to 1943). Until 2012, when he was surpassed by Charles J. Colgan, he was the longest serving member in the history of that body.

== Early and family life ==
Born at Hickory Hill, in Hanover County, Virginia, to the former Lucy Penn Taylor and her husband Williams Carter Wickham, Wickham could trace descent from the First Families of Virginia. His father was a prominent local planter and politician and during Henry's youth would become a delegate to the Virginia Secession Convention of 1861, then a Confederate brigadier general and as the Confederate defeat became nearly inevitable, a Confederate congressman who unsuccessfully sought peace terms short of surrender. His paternal ancestors could trace their descent from Thomas Wickham, who emigrated from England to Wethersfield Connecticut in 1658. His great-grandfather John Wickham had been praised as a great lawyer by John Randolph Tucker. Another paternal ancestor, Alexander Spotswood, erected the first iron furnace in America, and Thomas Nelson had been Governor of Virginia as well as served in the American Revolutionary War. His mother's ancestors included: John Penn who had signed the Declaration of Independence as one of North Carolina's representatives, as well as John Taylor of Caroline County, a lawyer and planter who became U.S. Senator from Virginia. As a boy, Wickham often accompanied his mother to Arlington, Virginia, to meet with Robert E. Lee, who also visited Hickory Hill.

== Education and American Civil War ==
Early in the American Civil War, Wickham (supposedly aged 14) visited his father, most famously as both rode over the Manassas Battlefield, as the dead were being buried. Their plantation, Hickory Hill, changed hands several times. Once, Union troops captured it while W.C. Wickham was recovering from severe wounds suffered at the Battle of Williamsburg, and the Union officer in charge, who had met W.C. Wickham in Arlington before the war, not only immediately paroled him, but also sent a Union surgeon to check on his care.

Wickham had received a private education suitable to his class before the war. Following the war, he attended Washington College (now Washington and Lee University) in Lexington, Virginia, where he renewed his friendship with Robert E. Lee, eating Sunday dinners with the family as well as graduated in 1868 with a Bachelor of Arts. Wickham then continued his education in Charlottesville, Virginia, and in 1870 received a Bachelor of Laws degree from the University of Virginia Law School. Wickham remained interested in the Phi Beta Kappa Society, the Sons of the American Revolution and the Episcopal Church during his adult life.

== Career ==
Admitted to the Virginia Bar in 1870, Wickham began his legal career as a law clerk in another lawyer's office, but soon developed his own practice, as well as capitalized on family railroad connections as described below. He also operated the Hickory Hill farm in Hanover County for most of his legislative career (also described below).

In February 1874 Wickham became assistant attorney For the Chesapeake and Ohio Railroad, which his father was reorganizing, and was named its assistant counsel in 1878. In 1886 Wickham became general solicitor of the Newport News & Mississippi Valley Railway Company, as well as became a director of the reorganized Chesapeake and Ohio Railway (C&O) (a position he would continue for the rest of his long life). In 1909 Wickham became vice president and general counsel of the C&O, and held that position until becoming an advisory counsel and returning to the Virginia Senate (part time) in 1923. Wickham thus worked for the C&O in various capacities for seven decades. He was also for a time a director of several railroads through Kentucky: the Big Sandy Railway Company, the Elizabethtown, Lexington & Big Sandy Railroad Company and the Maysville & Big Sandy Railroad Company.

In 1879 Wickham won his first election, to the Virginia House of Delegates representing Hanover County, but only served for two years.

Upon his father's death, he won that seat in the Virginia Senate, and was repeatedly re-elected for a decade. Wickham's particular concerns were for repayment of Virginia's prewar debt (then mostly held by foreign investors, but wealthy Virginians could buy coupons at a huge discount and use them at face value to pay Virginia taxes, which caused severe budget balance problems), especially for projects in what had become West Virginia. He became chairman of the powerful Virginia Senate Finance Committee before his speakership, and also advocated for pensions for Confederate veterans, and funding for Confederate memorials. While Wickham had accepted many policies of the Republican federal administrations following Reconstruction, as a Democrat, he also supported President Grover Cleveland, particularly on civil service reform and tariffs.

In 1918, Wickham briefly left his legal duties with the C&O to become general solicitor of the United States Railroad Administration during World War I. He then returned to the C&O as its general counsel, as well as that of the Hocking Valley Railroad until 1923.

When Charles U. Gravatt died on April 14, 1922, Wickham won the election to replace him as state senator for Caroline, Hanover and King William Counties, and again repeatedly won re-election, becoming Virginia's longest serving state senator, a record that would eventually be broken. When Lt. Governor was unable to lead the Senate in 1940, Wickham despite his age, chaired the entire session. By the time of his death, he had become a leading figure in the Virginia General Assembly and what had become the Byrd Organization. Both houses had passed a resolution urging him to run for re-election despite his age

== Personal life, death and legacy ==
In 1885, Wickham married Elise Warwick Barksdale, during their more than five decades of marriage, they had two sons, George Wickham and Williams Carter Wickham. She would survive him, as would their son, U.S. Navy Captain W.C. Wickham, and five grandchildren.

Wickham died on March 5, 1943, at a Richmond hotel, where he was attempting to recover from a broken hip suffered in a fall at his Hickory Hills home the previous December. At 93 years old, Wickham had been the oldest living alumnus of Washington and Lee University, and possibly one of the last who both knew General Robert E. Lee and received a degree from his hand. and not only were Virginia flags flown at half mast in his honor, many dignitaries planned to attend his funeral. He is buried at Richmond's historic Hollywood Cemetery.

Virginia House of Delegates
Preceded by	Virginia Delegate for Hanover County; 1879–1881	Succeeded by William D. Cardwell
Senate of Virginia
Preceded by Williams C. Wickham	Virginia Senator for the 32nd District; 1889–1908; 1923–1936	Succeeded by Charles U. Gravatt
Preceded by Charles U. Gravatt	Virginia Senator for the 32nd District; 1889–1908; 1923–1936	Succeeded by William A. Wright
Preceded by Robert O. Norris Jr.	Virginia Senator for the 31st District; 1936–1943	Succeeded by Thomas H. Blanton
Preceded by William Lovenstein	President pro tempore of the Virginia Senate; 1897–1908; 1938–1943	Succeeded by Edward Echols
Preceded by Saxon W. Holt	President pro tempore of the Virginia Senate; 1897–1908; 1938–1943	Succeeded by Robert O. Norris Jr.
