= Richard C. L. Moncure (politician) =

American politician

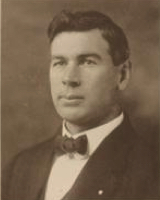

Member of the Virginia Senate from the 13th district
- In office January 10, 1912 – April 13, 1914
- Preceded by: F. Wilmer Sims
- Succeeded by: C. O'Conor Goolrick

Member of the Virginia House of Delegates for Stafford and King George
- In office January 10, 1906 – January 10, 1912
- Preceded by: Marion K. Lowry
- Succeeded by: Whit D. Peyton

Personal details
- Born: February 5, 1872 Richmond, Virginia, U.S.
- Died: May 25, 1937 (aged 65) Richmond, Virginia, U.S.
- Party: Democratic
- Spouse: Mary Ashby Wallace
- Education: College of William & Mary; University of Richmond

Richard Cassius Lee Moncure (February 5, 1872 – May 25, 1937) was an American Democratic politician who served as a member of the Virginia Senate, representing the state's 13th district.

He was elected to the Virginia Senate in 1911 and resigned after the 1914 session to accept appointment as Collector of Internal Revenue for the Eastern District of Virginia.

He was named for his maternal grandfather, Richard C. L. Moncure, a judge of the Virginia Supreme Court of Appeals.

His cousin Frank P. Moncure (another grandson of Justice R.C.L. Moncure) represented Stafford and Prince William Counties in the Virginia House of Delegates from 1936-1939 and 1944–1959. His son R.C.L. Moncure Jr. was elected Stafford County's Commissioner of Revenue and re-elected several times, the last in 1939.

Virginia House of Delegates
Preceded by Marion K. Lowry	Virginia Delegate for Stafford and King George; 1906–1912	Succeeded by Whit D. Peyton
Senate of Virginia
Preceded by F. Wilmer Sims	Virginia Senator for the 13th District; 1912–1914	Succeeded by C. O'Conor Goolrick
