= Earl C. Mathews =

American politician

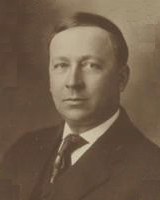

Member of the Virginia Senate from the 31st district
- In office January 12, 1916 – January 14, 1920
- Preceded by: John A. Lesner
- Succeeded by: Joseph T. Deal

Personal details
- Born: Earl Carlysle Mathews; March 26, 1879 Mathews County, Virginia, U.S.
- Died: June 12, 1953 (aged 74) Norfolk, Virginia, U.S.
- Party: Democratic

Earl Carlysle Mathews (March 26, 1879 – June 12, 1953) was an American Democratic politician who served as a member of the Virginia Senate from 1916 to 1920.

Senate of Virginia
Preceded by John A. Lesner	Virginia Senator for the 31st District; 1916–1920	Succeeded by Joseph T. Deal
