= William D. Blanks =

American politician

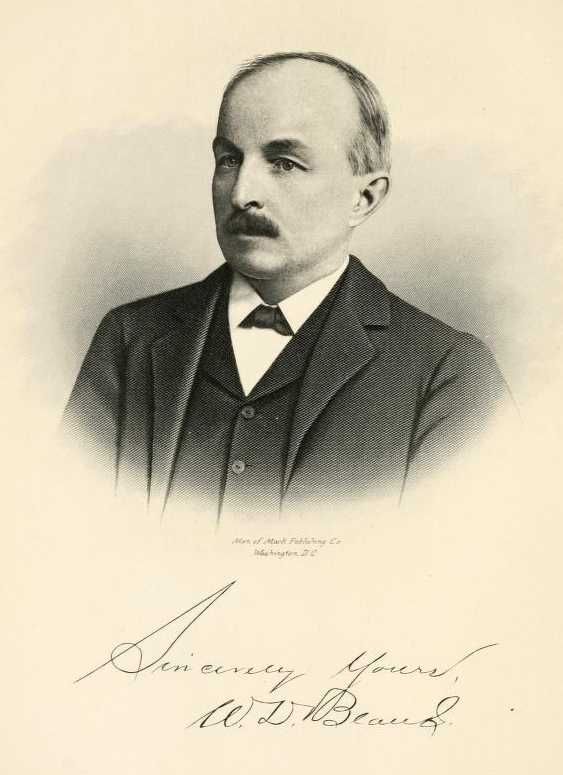

Member of the Virginia Senate from the 25th district
- In office January 10, 1912 – January 12, 1916
- Preceded by: James D. Elam
- Succeeded by: William H. Jeffreys, Jr.

Personal details
- Born: William Dabbs Blanks; April 3, 1864 Clarksville, Virginia, U.S.
- Died: February 6, 1921 (aged 56) Clarksville, Virginia, U.S.
- Party: Democratic
- Spouse: Julia Watkins

William Dabbs Blanks (April 3, 1864 – February 6, 1921) was an American Democratic politician who served as a member of the Virginia Senate, representing the state's 25th district.

Senate of Virginia
| Preceded by James D. Elam | Virginia Senator for the 25th District; 1912–1916 | Succeeded by William H. Jeffreys, Jr. |
