= Walter E. Addison =

American lawyer and politician (1863–1925)

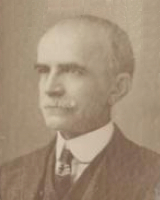

Member of the Virginia Senate from the 20th district
- In office January 12, 1916 – January 14, 1920
- Preceded by: Howell C. Featherston
- Succeeded by: Robert A. Russell

Personal details
- Born: Walter Edmund Addison; January 23, 1863 Richmond, Virginia, U.S.
- Died: January 12, 1925 (aged 61) Lynchburg, Virginia, U.S.
- Party: Democratic
- Spouse: Virginia Harrison
- Education: University of Virginia

Walter Edmund Addison (January 23, 1863 – January 12, 1925) was an American lawyer and Democratic politician who served as a member of the Virginia Senate, representing the state's 20th district.

Senate of Virginia
Preceded by Howell C. Featherston	Virginia Senator for the 20th District; 1916–1920	Succeeded by Robert A. Russell
