= Howell C. Featherston =

American politician (1871–1958)

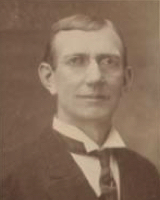

Member of the Virginia Senate from the 20th district
- In office January 10, 1912 – January 12, 1916
- Preceded by: Don P. Halsey
- Succeeded by: Walter E. Addison

Member of the Virginia House of Delegates from Campbell County
- In office January 8, 1908 – January 12, 1910
- Preceded by: Eugene Ould
- Succeeded by: Frank Nelson

Personal details
- Born: Howell Colston Featherston; April 27, 1871 Campbell, Virginia, U.S.
- Died: January 5, 1958 (aged 86) Lynchburg, Virginia, U.S.
- Party: Democratic
- Spouse: Virginia Carroll Kelly

Howell Colston Featherston (April 27, 1871 – January 5, 1958) was an American Democratic politician who served as a member of the Virginia Senate, representing the state's 20th district.

Virginia House of Delegates
Preceded by Eugene Ould	Virginia Delegate for Campbell County; 1908–1910	Succeeded by Frank Nelson
Senate of Virginia
Preceded by Don P. Halsey	Virginia Senator for the 20th District; 1912–1916	Succeeded by Walter E. Addison
