= Granville R. Swift =

American politician

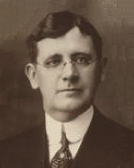

Member of the Virginia House of Delegates for Spotsylvania and Fredericksburg
- In office January 12, 1916 – January 9, 1918
- Preceded by: Samuel P. Powell
- Succeeded by: Emmett R. Carner
- In office January 10, 1906 – February 1907
- Preceded by: M. H. Dickinson
- Succeeded by: C. O'Conor Goolrick

Personal details
- Born: Granville Richard Swift; December 25, 1870 Spotsylvania, Virginia, U.S.
- Died: May 4, 1949 (aged 78) Orange, Florida, U.S.
- Party: Democratic
- Spouse: Lillian Rawlings
- Education: Fredericksburg College (A.B.); Columbian College (LL.B.)

Granville Richard Swift (December 25, 1870 – May 4, 1949) was a Virginia politician. He served twice as a Democrat in the Virginia House of Delegates.

Virginia House of Delegates
| Preceded by M. H. Dickinson | Virginia Delegate for Spotsylvania and Fredericksburg; 1906–1907; 1916–1918 | Succeeded by C. O'Conor Goolrick |
| Preceded by Samuel P. Powell | Virginia Delegate for Spotsylvania and Fredericksburg; 1906–1907; 1916–1918 | Succeeded by Emmett R. Carner |
