= C. O'Conor Goolrick =

American politician (1876–1960)

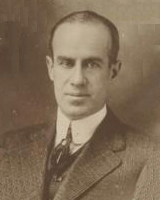

Member of the Virginia Senate from the 13th district
- In office January 13, 1915 – January 9, 1924
- Preceded by: Richard C. L. Moncure
- Succeeded by: William A. Garrett

Member of the Virginia House of Delegates for Spotsylvania and Fredericksburg
- In office January 8, 1908 – January 12, 1910
- Preceded by: Granville R. Swift
- Succeeded by: C. Richelieu Coleman

Personal details
- Born: Charles O'Conor Goolrick; November 25, 1876 Fredericksburg, Virginia, U.S.
- Died: June 4, 1960 (aged 83) Fredericksburg, Virginia, U.S.
- Party: Democratic
- Spouse: Anne Osborne Ficklen (m. 1910)
- Relatives: Mabel Rowland (sister-in-law)
- Education: Virginia Military Institute; University of Virginia

Charles O'Conor Goolrick (November 25, 1876 – June 4, 1960) was a Virginia lawyer and politician whose legislative accomplishments include the establishment of a school for the training of teachers at Fredericksburg, Virginia that became the University of Mary Washington, and the establishment of modern systems for worker's compensation, public education, and the state highway department.

== Career ==
Goolrick graduated from the Virginia Military Institute and the University of Virginia Law School, where he was inducted into Phi Beta Kappa. He served in the Virginia House of Delegates from 1908 to 1915, and in the Senate of Virginia from 1915 to 1923.

In 1908, he played a key role in the fight to have a normal school for the training of teachers located in Fredericksburg. At that time, Virginia's only institution devoted exclusively to the training of teachers for public schools was the Normal School for Women at Farmville (now Longwood University). During the 1908 legislative session, two new locations were under consideration, with the Senate supporting Harrisonburg and the House of Delegates selecting Fredericksburg. A compromise was reached, and legislation was passed that created what is today James Madison University and the University of Mary Washington.

Goolrick founded and served as president for the Community Care Fund in Fredericksburg, VA in 1939, which would later become the present day Rappahannock United Way.

Goolrick also was the author of the workman's compensation bill of Virginia, copatron of the state's first compulsory education law, and a member of the 1918-19 commission that laid the foundation for the county-unit system of public school administration. After his state service, Goolrick was city attorney for Fredericksburg for 28 years, and served as Fredericksburg mayor. He was a president of the Virginia Bar Association, and for many years was the president of The Free Lance-Star Publishing Company. In 1950, he was the first recipient of the B'nai B'rith Award for distinguished service to the community, and he was a member of the Mary Washington Board of Visitors when it was affiliated with the University of Virginia. In 1967 the new physical education building of the University of Mary Washington was named Goolrick Hall in his honor.

Goolrick was president of the Virginia convention in 1933 to act on the Twenty-First Amendment, repealing Prohibition.

== Personal life and family ==
Goolrick married Anne "Nannie" Osborne Ficklen on May 25, 1910. Together they had a daughter, Frances Seymour.

== See also ==
- List of mayors of Fredericksburg, Virginia

Virginia House of Delegates
Preceded by Granville R. Swift	Virginia Delegate for Spotsylvania and Fredericksburg; 1908–1910	Succeeded by C. Richelieu Coleman
Senate of Virginia
Preceded by Richard C. L. Moncure	Virginia Senator for the 13th District; 1915–1924	Succeeded by William A. Garrett
