= Thomas S. Hening =

American politician

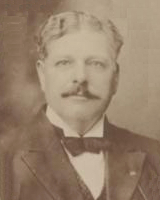

Member of the Virginia Senate from the 16th district
- In office January 12, 1916 – January 9, 1924
- Preceded by: John B. Watkins
- Succeeded by: John H. Johnson

Personal details
- Born: Thomas Scott Hening; July 26, 1871 Powhatan County, Virginia, U.S.
- Died: April 29, 1934 (aged 62) Powhatan, Virginia, U.S.
- Party: Democratic
- Spouse: Linda Marion May
- Education: Medical College of Virginia

Thomas Scott Hening (July 26, 1871 – April 29, 1934) was an American medical doctor and Democratic politician who served as a member of the Virginia Senate. There he represented the state's 16th district from 1916 to 1924.

Senate of Virginia
Preceded by John B. Watkins	Virginia Senator for the 16th District; 1916–1924	Succeeded by John H. Johnson
