= R. Holman Willis =

American politician (1880–1954)

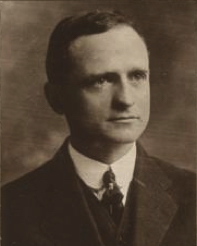

Member of the Virginia Senate from the 21st district
- In office January 9, 1924 – January 11, 1928
- Preceded by: Marshall B. Booker
- Succeeded by: Abram P. Staples

Member of the Virginia House of Delegates from Roanoke City
- In office January 14, 1914 – January 9, 1924
- Preceded by: William Watts
- Succeeded by: James A. Bear; John W. Wright

Personal details
- Born: Russell Holman Willis; January 12, 1880 Marshall, Missouri, U.S.
- Died: August 9, 1954 (aged 74) Roanoke, Virginia, U.S.
- Party: Democratic
- Spouse: Bess Bennett Brower
- Education: Richmond College (LLB)

Russell Holman Willis (January 12, 1880 – August 9, 1954) was an American Democratic politician who served in the Virginia General Assembly, first as a member of the Virginia House of Delegates and later in the Virginia Senate. He held the position of majority floor leader in the House of Delegates from 1916 until his election to the Senate. Willis died at age 74 in Roanoke, Virginia.

Virginia House of Delegates
| Preceded by William Watts | Virginia Delegate for Roanoke City; 1914–1924 | Succeeded by James A. Bear; John W. Wright |
| Preceded by Martin Williams | House Majority Leader; 1916–1924 | Succeeded by Unknown |
Senate of Virginia
| Preceded by Marshall B. Booker | Virginia Senator for the 21st District; 1924–1928 | Succeeded by Abram P. Staples |
