= Sands Gayle =

American politician

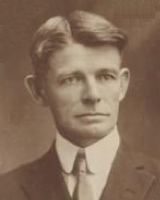

Member of the Virginia Senate from the 18th district
- In office January 12, 1910 – December 21, 1918
- Preceded by: William C. White
- Succeeded by: S. L. Ferguson

Member of the North Carolina House of Representatives from Halifax County
- In office November 8, 1904 – November 6, 1906
- Preceded by: William F. Parker
- Succeeded by: A. Paul Kitchin

Personal details
- Born: February 13, 1870 Hanover, Virginia, U.S.
- Died: December 21, 1918 (aged 48) Buckingham, Virginia, U.S.
- Party: Democratic
- Spouse: Sarah Look Boatwright
- Education: Richmond College

Sands Gayle (February 13, 1870 – December 21, 1918) was an American lawyer and Democratic politician who served as a member of the Virginia Senate, representing the state's 18th district.

Born in Hanover County, Virginia, the son of Confederate veteran Mordecai Gayle and his wife, the former Virginia Broaddus, he graduated from Richmond College (now the University of Richmond) in 1897.

He practiced law in North Carolina and served in the North Carolina legislature before moving his legal practice to Buckingham County, Virginia. Active in the local Democratic party (that became the Byrd Organization after his death), he won election and re-election to the state senate in a district that included Appomattox, Buckingham, Fluvanna and Charlotte Counties. He died in office after an illness of about two months, and Samuel Lewis Ferguson replaced him in the 1919 extra session and also won re-election.

North Carolina House of Representatives
Preceded by William F. Parker	North Carolina Representative for Halifax County; 1905–1907; Served alongside: T. C. Harrison	Succeeded by A. Paul Kitchin
Senate of Virginia
Preceded by William C. White	Virginia Senator for the 18th District; 1910–1918	Succeeded by S. L. Ferguson
