= John B. Watkins =

American politician

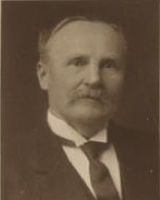

Member of the Virginia Senate from the 35th district
- In office January 11, 1928 – November 30, 1931
- Preceded by: Julien Gunn
- Succeeded by: W. Conway Saunders

Member of the Virginia Senate from the 16th district
- In office January 8, 1908 – January 12, 1916
- Preceded by: Joseph P. Sadler
- Succeeded by: Thomas S. Hening

Personal details
- Born: John Benjamin Watkins; June 14, 1855 Powhatan County, Virginia, U.S.
- Died: November 30, 1931 (aged 76) Richmond, Virginia, U.S.
- Party: Democratic
- Spouse: Lelia Neville Michaux
- Education: Richmond College

John Benjamin Watkins (June 14, 1855 – November 30, 1931) was a Democratic politician who served as a member of the Virginia Senate twice, first representing the state's 16th district, and a second time representing the 35th district, comprising Henrico, Chesterfield, New Kent, Charles City, and James City Counties and the City of Williamsburg (which he held at the time of his death). A businessman, Senator Watkins started a nursery with his brother in Midlothian, Virginia. John B. Watkins is the great-grandfather of Virginia State Senator John Watkins, who represents some of the same localities in the current Virginia Senate as well as continuing to operate the family nursery business.

Senate of Virginia
Preceded by Julien Gunn	Virginia Senator for the 35th District; 1928–1931	Succeeded by W. Conway Saunders
Preceded by Joseph P. Sadler	Virginia Senator for the 16th District; 1908–1916	Succeeded by Thomas S. Hening
