= William L. Andrews =

American politician (1865–1936)

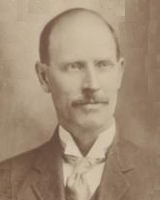

Member of the Virginia Senate from the 4th district
- In office January 13, 1915 – January 9, 1924
- Preceded by: John M. Hart
- Succeeded by: J. Belmont Woodson

Personal details
- Born: William Luther Andrews; February 9, 1865 Albemarle, Virginia, U.S.
- Died: July 19, 1936 (aged 71) Roanoke, Virginia, U.S.
- Party: Democratic
- Spouse: Mary John Ruebush
- Education: University of Virginia

William Luther Andrews (February 9, 1865 – July 19, 1936) was an American Democratic politician who served as a member of the Virginia Senate, representing the state's 4th district.

Senate of Virginia
Preceded by John M. Hart	Virginia Senator for the 4th District; 1915–1924	Succeeded by J. Belmont Woodson
