= Don P. Halsey =

American politician (1870–1938)

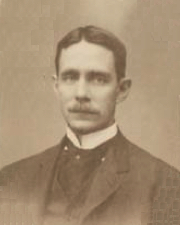

Member of the Virginia Senate from the 20th district
- In office January 8, 1908 – January 10, 1912
- Preceded by: Alsen F. Thomas
- Succeeded by: Howell C. Featherston
- In office November 12, 1902 – January 13, 1904
- Preceded by: Carter Glass
- Succeeded by: Alsen F. Thomas

Personal details
- Born: Don Peters Halsey; December 29, 1870 Lynchburg, Virginia, U.S.
- Died: June 30, 1938 (aged 67) Lynchburg, Virginia, U.S.
- Party: Democratic
- Spouse: Mary Michaeux Dickinson

Don Peters Halsey (December 29, 1870 – June 30, 1938) was an American Democratic politician who served twice as a member of the Virginia Senate, representing the state's 20th district from 1902 to 1904 and again from 1908 to 1912.

Senate of Virginia
Preceded by Carter Glass	Virginia Senator for the 20th District; 1902–1904; 1908–1912	Succeeded by Alsen F. Thomas
Preceded by Alsen F. Thomas	Virginia Senator for the 20th District; 1902–1904; 1908–1912	Succeeded by Howell C. Featherston
