= Clyde T. Bowers =

American politician

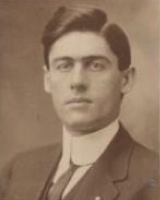

Member of the Virginia Senate from the 15th district
- In office January 10, 1912 – January 14, 1920
- Preceded by: F. Pendleton Carter
- Succeeded by: John J. Miller

Personal details
- Born: Clyde Thomas Bowers; July 29, 1881 Culpeper, Virginia, U.S.
- Died: September 30, 1968 (aged 87) Richmond, Virginia, U.S.
- Party: Democratic
- Spouse: Bessie Nethers
- Education: Richmond College

Clyde Thomas Bowers (July 29, 1881 – September 30, 1968) was an American Democratic politician who served as a member of the Virginia Senate, representing the state's 15th district.

Senate of Virginia
Preceded by F. Pendleton Carter	Virginia Senator for the 15th District; 1912–1920	Succeeded by John J. Miller
