= James Taylor Ellyson =

American politician (1847–1919)

J. Taylor Ellyson
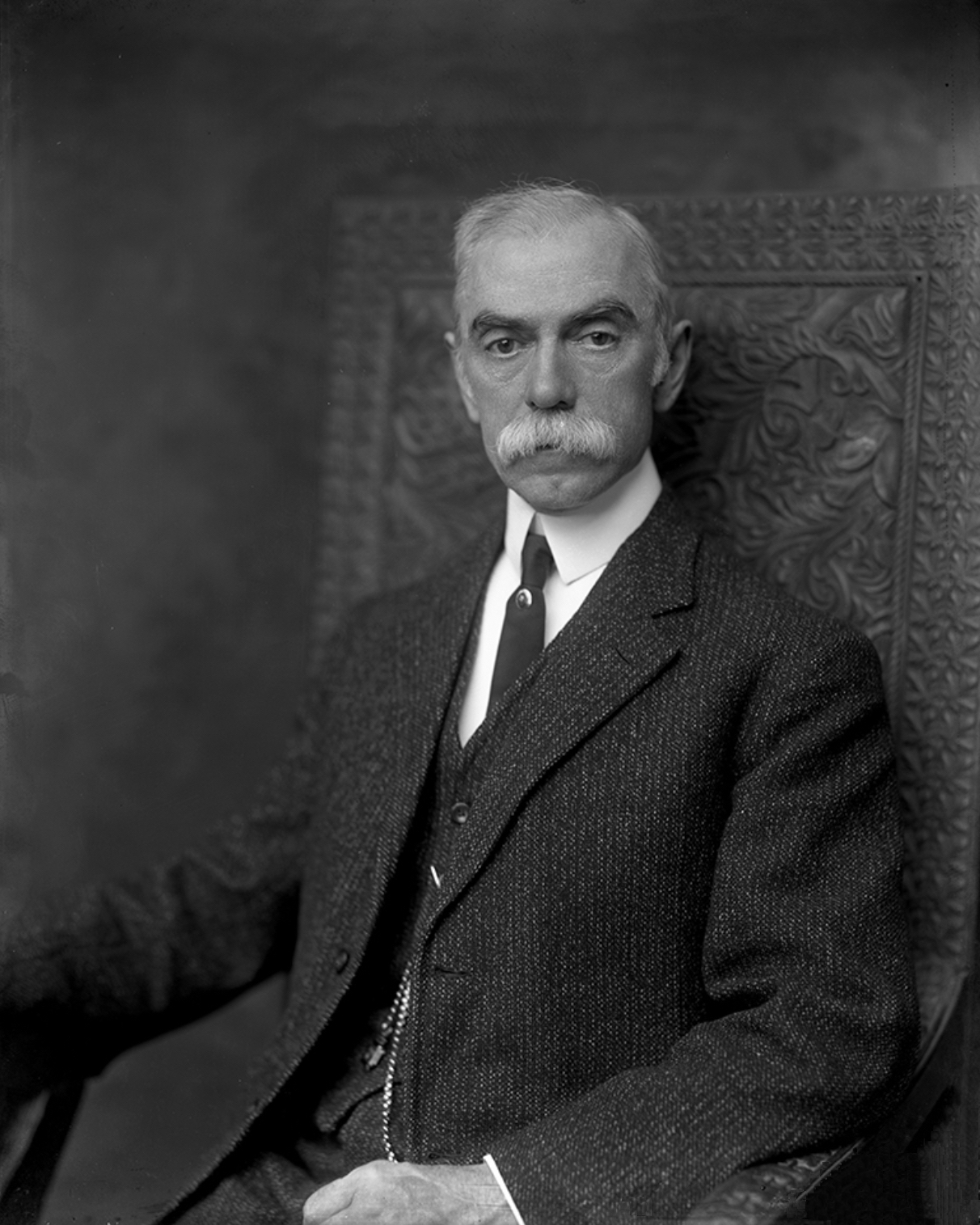
- Portrait of Ellyson, 1912

20th Lieutenant Governor of Virginia
- In office February 1, 1906 – February 1, 1918
- Governor: Claude A. Swanson; William Hodges Mann; Henry C. Stuart
- Preceded by: Joseph E. Willard
- Succeeded by: Benjamin F. Buchanan

50th Mayor of Richmond, Virginia
- In office July 1, 1888 – June 30, 1894
- Preceded by: William C. Carrington
- Succeeded by: Richard M. Taylor

Member of the Virginia Senate from the 35th district
- In office December 2, 1885 – July 1, 1888 Serving with William Lovenstein
- Preceded by: Henry A. Atkinson Jr.
- Succeeded by: Conway R. Sands

Personal details
- Born: James Taylor Ellyson; May 20, 1847 Richmond, Virginia, U.S.
- Died: March 18, 1919 (aged 71) Richmond, Virginia, U.S.
- Resting place: Hollywood Cemetery
- Party: Democratic
- Spouse: Lora Effie Hotchkiss
- Education: University of Virginia (LLB)
- Occupation: Politician; lawyer
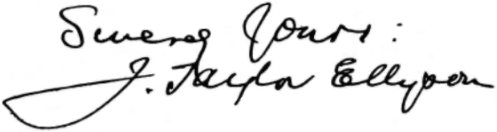
- Signature

Military service
- Allegiance: Confederate States
- Branch/service: Confederate States Army
- Years of service: 1863–1865
- Battles/wars: American Civil War

James Taylor Ellyson (May 20, 1847 – March 18, 1919) was a Virginia lawyer and Democratic politician, who served in several positions in his native Richmond, Virginia and statewide.

== Early life and education ==
Born in Richmond, Virginia to journalist and Baptist lay activist Henry K. Ellyson and his wife Elizabeth, James Taylor Ellyson was the second of their four sons, and also had three sisters (of whom only one survived to adulthood). His family owned enslaved persons. His father served briefly in the Virginia House of Delegates when James was growing up, but his main business was as a printer (and he would become half-owner of the Richmond Dispatch in late 1865). Henry Ellyson also served as sheriff of Henrico County beginning in 1857 and through the American Civil War, and published articles supporting slavery before the election of President Abraham Lincoln, which he had opposed.

James Ellyson was educated by tutors and in private schools. When he reached legal age in 1863, he left Hampden-Sydney College and enlisted to fight for the Confederacy in the Second Company of Richmond Howitzers, where he served until surrendering with his company at Appomattox Courthouse near the war's end.

James Ellyson attended Columbian College in Washington, D.C. for one term after the war, reportedly wearing his Confederate uniform. He then transferred to Richmond College (which his father was helping to restart) for one term, and from which his remaining younger brother William Ellyson would graduate in 1870. James Taylor Ellyson however, moved to Charlottesville to attend the University of Virginia, from which he graduated with a degree in law after editing the campus magazine and participating in the Sigma Chi fraternity and Jefferson Literary Society in his spare time.

== Politics ==
Ellyson assisted at his father's paper, the Dispatch, briefly after graduation, then began a bookselling and stationary partnership with Henry Taylor of Baltimore, as "Ellyson & Taylor" from 1869-1879.

Ellyson also became active in politics, and served for 14 years as chairman of the state's Democratic Central Committee. His first electoral victory was a seat on the Richmond City Council, and eventually he became its president. His father had helped found the Conservative Party of Virginia after the war, and won election as Richmond's first mayor after Congressional Reconstruction in 1870, first elected by a newly appointed city council (as affirmed by the Virginia Supreme Court) and then by voters. However, he resigned after less than six months because rampant evidence of skullduggery during the May 1870 voting tainted his victory and he chose not to run a second time. The senior Ellyson had helped create the Richmond School Board and his son served 16 years as its chairman.

In his long political career, J. Taylor Ellyson served in the Virginia Senate (1885-1888, resigning his position on the city council to assume that part-time state legislative position), and as mayor of Richmond (1888–1894). He also served for twelve years (1906–1918) as the 20th Lieutenant Governor of Virginia. To date, he is the only Lieutenant Governor of the commonwealth to serve for three terms.

The second mayor Ellyson succeeded William C. Carrington, who had served since 1876 and announced his retirement for health reasons. During the previous several years, scandals concerning misappropriation of city funds had rocked Richmond's city council (which was more powerful than the mayor whom it elected), particularly after the death of long-time city collector Aylett R. Woodson (who had served from 1876 until his death in 1887). Although the younger Ellyson held progressive views concerning labor unions, he was a conservative on race and other matters during what would become his three terms as mayor. Many Republicans had been removed from city offices when Richmond helped elect Grover Cleveland president in 1884, and local Democrats took control of city hall. After Ellyson's summertime election nearly four years later, additional black and white Republicans were soon removed from city offices and jobs. In the fall of 1888, Democrats carried the city for President Cleveland (who however, lost the election on a national level.)

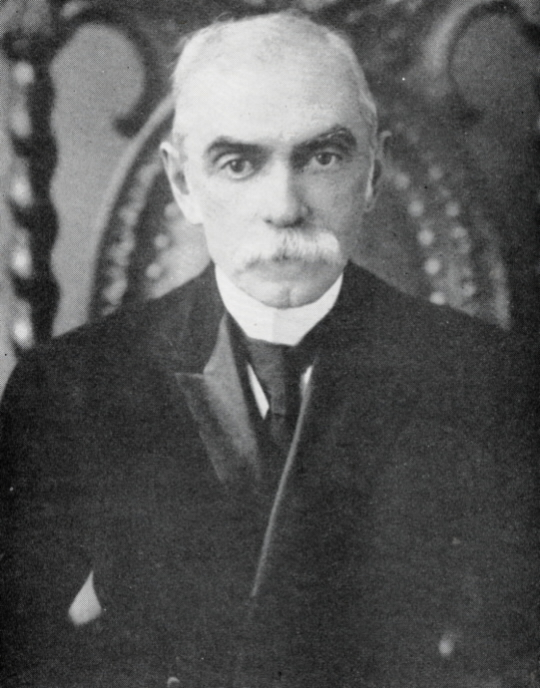
Ellyson in c. 1905

Ellyson was active in the Lost Cause movement, as well as revitalized the state's Democratic Party from the postwar Conservative Party of Virginia which his father had helped John S. Barbour, Jr. found. J. Taylor Ellyson worked with the Martin Organization and helped pass many Jim Crow laws. He was an unsuccessful candidate for the Democratic nomination for governor in 1897 (fellow Confederate veteran James Hoge Tyler winning the party's nomination, then easily winning the general election). Ellyson served as president of the Jefferson Davis Monument Association and of the Richmond Howitzers Association. Active in both the R. E. Lee and George E. Pickett Camps of Confederate veterans, Ellyson represented both in the annual conventions of United Confederate Veterans. A member of the Westmoreland and Commonwealth Clubs, as well as the Society for the Preservation of Virginia Antiquities and the Confederate Memorial and Literary Society, J. Taylor Ellyson also raised funds and otherwise helped construct a new building for the Virginia Historical Society in Richmond's then-developing Fan District that included many murals promoting the losing Confederate cause.

His father had served on the Board of Trustees of Richmond College, including as its president from 1886 until his death in 1890. J. Taylor Ellyson was then elected to the institution's Board of Trustees, and served from 1891–1919. Ellyson helped select the institution's longest-serving President, Frederic W. Boatwright, in 1895. He served as the Board's president from 1908 until his own death in 1919. Ellyson also served at least 31 years as executive officer of the education board of the Baptist General Association of Virginia, and also on the state mission board and the orphanage board.

== Death ==
Ellyson left his statewide office in 1918 and died just over a year later.

Senate of Virginia
Preceded by Henry A. Atkinson, Jr.	Virginia Senator for the 35th District; 1885–1888; Served alongside: William Lovenstein	Succeeded by Conway R. Sands
Political offices
Preceded by William C. Carrington	Mayor of Richmond, Virginia; 1888–1894	Succeeded by Richard M. Taylor
Preceded by Joseph E. Willard	Lieutenant Governor of Virginia; 1906–1918	Succeeded by Benjamin F. Buchanan
