= G. Walter Mapp =

American lawyer and politician

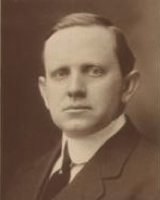

Member of the Virginia Senate from the 37th district
- In office January 10, 1912 – January 9, 1924
- Preceded by: Ben T. Gunter
- Succeeded by: Warner Ames

Personal details
- Born: George Walter Mapp; May 23, 1873 Wachapreague, Virginia, U.S.
- Died: February 2, 1941 (aged 67) Franktown, Virginia, U.S.
- Party: Democratic
- Spouses: Georgianna Quinby; Mildred Townsend Aydelotte
- Education: College of William & Mary; Centre College; University of Virginia

George Walter Mapp (May 23, 1873 – February 2, 1941) was an American lawyer and Democratic politician who served as a member of the Virginia Senate, where he was a strong proponent of prohibition and women's suffrage.

Senate of Virginia
Preceded by Ben T. Gunter	Virginia Senator for the 37th District; 1912–1924	Succeeded by
