= R. Ewell Thornton =

American politician from Virginia (1865–1928)

Richard Ewell Thornton
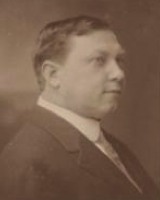
- Thornton (c. 1912)

Member of the Virginia Senate from the 14th district
- In office January 8, 1908 – January 14, 1920
- Preceded by: Lewis H. Machen
- Succeeded by: Walter T. Oliver

Personal details
- Born: January 7, 1865 Brentsville, Virginia, U.S.
- Died: March 27, 1928 (aged 63) Fairfax County, Virginia, U.S.
- Resting place: Arlington National Cemetery
- Party: Democratic
- Spouse: Susan Conte Plummer (m. 1891)
- Education: University of Virginia School of Law

Military service
- Allegiance: United States
- Branch/service: United States Army
- Years of service: 1919–1920
- Rank: Major
- Unit: J.A.G. Corps
- Battles/wars: World War I

Richard Ewell Thornton (January 7, 1865 – March 27, 1928) was an American lawyer and Democratic politician who served as a member of the Virginia Senate, representing the state's 14th district from 1908 to 1920.

== Early life ==
Richard Ewell Thornton was born on January 7, 1865, in Brentsville, Virginia, to William Willis Thornton. His father served in the Confederate States Army and was a superintendent of schools in Prince William County. His family moved to Fairfax County in his childhood. He studied law at the University of Virginia School of Law. He was admitted to the bar in Fairfax County in 1891. His brother J. B. T. Thornton was a judge of the circuit court in Fairfax, Arlington and Prince William counties.

== Career ==
Thornton practiced law in Fairfax County. He organized the Fairfax County Bar Association and served as its first president.

Thornton served as a member of the state senate from January 1908 to January 1920.

On April 11, 1919, Thornton was commissioned to the U.S. Army as a major in the judge advocate general's office in the U.S. Department of War. He served during World War I. He compiled and annotated a list of military laws into The Military Laws of the United States during his service. He was honorably discharged on September 30, 1920.

Thornton served as the first president and later as vice president of the Fairfax National Bank. The bank was organized in 1902.

== Personal life ==
Thornton married Sue Conte Plummer of Prince George's County, Maryland, on June 25, 1891. They did not have children. Thornton was a vestryman of Zion Episcopal Church.

Thornton was hospitalized at Providence Hospital and later died on March 27, 1928, at his home in Fairfax, Virginia. He was buried at Arlington National Cemetery.

Senate of Virginia
Preceded by Lewis H. Machen	Virginia Senator for the 14th District; 1908–1920	Succeeded by Walter T. Oliver
