= Charles U. Gravatt =

American politician

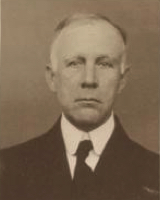

Member of the Virginia Senate from the 32nd district
- In office January 8, 1908 – April 14, 1922
- Preceded by: Henry T. Wickham
- Succeeded by: Henry T. Wickham

Personal details
- Born: Charles Urquhart Gravatt; June 28, 1849 Port Royal, Virginia, U.S.
- Died: April 14, 1922 (aged 72) Richmond, Virginia, U.S.
- Party: Democratic
- Spouse: Florence Camp Marshall
- Education: College of Physicians and Surgeons, Baltimore (M.D.)

Military service
- Allegiance: United States
- Branch/service: United States Navy
- Years of service: 1870–1899
- Rank: Medical director
- Unit: Medical Corps
- Battles/wars: Spanish–American War

Charles Urquhart Gravatt (June 28, 1849 – April 14, 1922) was an American physician, naval officer, and Democratic politician who served as a member of the Virginia Senate from 1908 until his death in 1922. A veteran of the Spanish–American War, he served as the fleet surgeon under Admiral William T. Sampson at the Battle of Santiago de Cuba.

His younger brother, William Loyall Gravatt, was the longtime Bishop of the Episcopal Diocese of West Virginia.

Senate of Virginia
Preceded by Henry T. Wickham	Virginia Senator for the 32nd District; 1908–1922	Succeeded by Henry T. Wickham
