= Saxon W. Holt =

American politician (1871–1940)

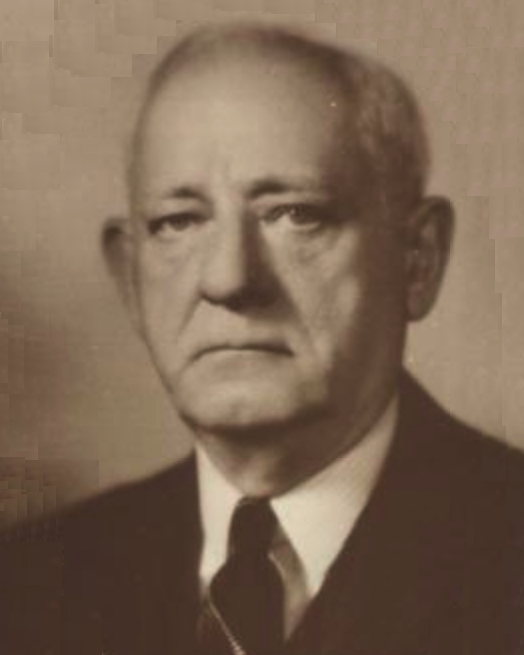
- Portrait of Holt, c. 1936

24th Lieutenant Governor of Virginia
- In office January 19, 1938 – March 31, 1940
- Governor: James H. Price
- Preceded by: James H. Price
- Succeeded by: William M. Tuck

President pro tempore of the Virginia Senate
- In office January 14, 1920 – January 12, 1938
- Preceded by: C. Harding Walker
- Succeeded by: Henry T. Wickham

Member of the Virginia Senate
- In office January 13, 1904 – January 12, 1938
- Preceded by: D. Gardiner Tyler
- Succeeded by: Alexander L. Bivins
- Constituency: 36th district (1904–1924); 34th district (1924–1936); 33rd district (1936–1938)

Personal details
- Born: Saxon Winston Holt; March 25, 1871 Surry County, Virginia, U.S.
- Died: March 31, 1940 (aged 69) Newport News, Virginia, U.S.
- Resting place: Surry County, Virginia, U.S.
- Party: Democratic
- Spouse: Maria Davis Reynolds (m. 1904)
- Children: 3
- Relatives: Henry W. Holt (brother)
- Occupation: Politician; businessman

Saxon Winston Holt (March 25, 1871 – March 31, 1940), a Democrat, served as a member of the Virginia Senate and as the 24th Lieutenant Governor of Virginia from 1938 until 1940.

== Early life ==
Saxon Winston Holt was born on March 25, 1871, at the family farm in Surry County, Virginia, to Virginia Henry (née Winston) and Dr. Micajah Quincy Holt. His father practiced medicine in Surry County and also worked as a farmer. His grandfather Micajah Holt was a captain in the U.S. Army and served in the War of 1812. Holt was educated in county schools and at Bethel Academy.

== Career ==
At the age of 20, Holt became a shipping clerk at a grocery company in Richmond. After two years, he worked as a tobacco salesman for Butler & Bosher, a Richmond firm. In the 1890s, he moved to Newport News and started S. W. Holt and Co., a wholesale grocers firm, with Arthur St. Clair Butler. Butler later sold his interest to Holt's brother Robert P. Holt. Holt continued working with the firm until his death. He was vice president of First National Bank.

Holt served as a member of the Virginia Senate, representing Elizabeth City, York, Warwick and Newport News, from 1904 to 1938. He served on various committees throughout his career, including finance, general laws, social and moral welfare, privileges and elections, and the steering committee. He served as president pro tempore of the senate the last 15 years of his legislative service. He was an advocate for hospital improvements and supported the legislation for the Catawba Sanatorium.

Holt served as Lieutenant Governor of Virginia from January 19, 1938, until his death.

== Personal life ==
Holt married Maria Davis Reynolds, daughter of Mary A. (née Watkins) and Henry S. Reynolds, of Norfolk in 1904. They had one daughter and two sons, Maria, Saxon W. Jr. and Micajah Quincy. They lived in Newport News. His brother was judge Henry W. Holt. He was a member of the First Presbyterian Church.

Holt died on March 31, 1940, at his home on Huntington Avenue in Newport News. He was buried in a family plot in Surry County.

== Electoral history ==
| Date | Election | Candidate | Party | Votes | % |
Lieutenant Governor of Virginia
| Nov 2, 1937 | General | Saxon W. Holt | Democratic | 121,919 | 81.96 |
| Nov 2, 1937 | General | Samuel A. Reynolds | Republican | 24,758 | 16.64 |
| Nov 2, 1937 | General | Robert L. Alter | Prohibition | 2,085 | 1.40 |
| Nov 2, 1937 | General | James H. Price did not seek reelection; seat stayed Democratic | | | |

Senate of Virginia
| Preceded by None | Virginia Senator for the 36th District; 1904–1924 | Succeeded by Morgan R. Mills |
| Preceded by Thomas J. Downing | Virginia Senator for the 34th District; 1924–1936 | Succeeded by Hunsdon Cary |
| Preceded by William A. Wright | Virginia Senator for the 33rd District; 1936–1938 | Succeeded by Alexander L. Bivins |
| Preceded by C. Harding Walker | President pro tempore of the Virginia Senate; 1920–1938 | Succeeded by Henry T. Wickham |
Political offices
| Preceded by James Hubert Price | Lieutenant Governor of Virginia; 1938–1940 | Succeeded by William Munford Tuck |
