= George T. Rison =

American politician (1850–1929)

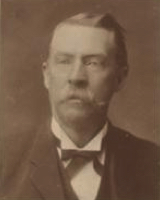

Member of the Virginia Senate from the 24th district
- In office January 13, 1904 – February 28, 1923
- Preceded by: Joseph Whitehead
- Succeeded by: Nathaniel E. Clement

Personal details
- Born: George Townes Rison; February 3, 1850 Danville, Virginia, U.S.
- Died: January 28, 1929 (aged 78) Chatham, Virginia, U.S.
- Party: Democratic
- Spouse(s): Emma Moschler; Ida Ruth Tompkins
- Education: University of Virginia

George Townes Rison (February 3, 1850 – January 28, 1929) was an American Democratic politician who served as a member of the Virginia Senate. He resigned before the end of his fifth term in 1923.

Senate of Virginia
Preceded by Joseph Whitehead	Virginia Senator for the 24th District; 1904–1923	Succeeded by Nathaniel E. Clement
