= Nathaniel B. Early =

American politician (1866–1947)

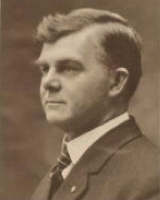

Member of the Virginia Senate from the 27th district
- In office January 9, 1924 – September 1933
- Preceded by: William B. Cocke
- Succeeded by: John S. Battle

Member of the Virginia Senate from the 17th district
- In office January 8, 1908 – January 9, 1924
- Preceded by: John S. Chapman
- Succeeded by: John M. Beaty

Member of the Virginia House of Delegates for Madison and Greene
- In office December 1, 1897 – January 8, 1908
- Preceded by: George W. Graves
- Succeeded by: James E. Thrift

Personal details
- Born: Nathaniel Bezaleel Early; July 30, 1866 Albemarle, Virginia, U.S.
- Died: August 15, 1947 (aged 81) Greene, Virginia, U.S.
- Party: Democratic
- Spouse: Susan Brent Brown
- Education: Virginia Military Institute; University of Virginia

Nathaniel Bezaleel Early (July 30, 1866 – August 15, 1947) was an American Democratic politician who served as a member of the Virginia Senate from 1908 to 1934.

Virginia House of Delegates
Preceded by George W. Graves	Virginia Delegate for Madison and Greene; 1897–1908	Succeeded by James E. Thrift
Senate of Virginia
Preceded by John S. Chapman	Virginia Senator for the 17th District; 1908–1924	Succeeded by John M. Beaty
Preceded by William B. Cocke	Virginia Senator for the 27th District; 1924–1934	Succeeded by John S. Battle
