= William A. Garrett =

American politician

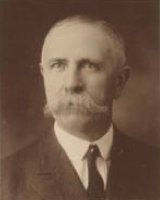

Member of the Virginia Senate
- In office December 4, 1901 – January 10, 1940
- Preceded by: Rorer A. James
- Succeeded by: John W. Carter Jr.
- Constituency: 23rd district (1901‍–‍1924); 13th district (1924‍–‍1940)

Member of the Virginia House of Delegates from Henry County
- In office December 1, 1897 – December 6, 1899
- Preceded by: John R. Armstrong
- Succeeded by: William H. Gravely

Personal details
- Born: William Allen Garrett; July 27, 1854 Rockingham County, North Carolina, U.S.
- Died: June 21, 1951 (aged 96) Rockingham County, North Carolina, U.S.
- Party: Democratic
- Spouses: Susan Emily Trent (m. 1880; died 1904); Emma Washington Garrett (m. 1908; died 1922)

William Allen Garrett (July 27, 1854 – June 21, 1951) was an American lawyer and Democratic politician who served as a member of the Virginia Senate from 1901 to 1940.

Virginia House of Delegates
Preceded by John R. Armstrong	Virginia Delegate for Henry County; 1897–1899	Succeeded by William H. Gravely
Senate of Virginia
Preceded by Rorer A. James	Virginia Senator for the 23rd District; 1901–1924	Succeeded by Samuel S. Lambeth Jr.
Preceded by C. O'Conor Goolrick	Virginia Senator for the 13th District; 1924–1940	Succeeded by John W. Carter, Jr.
