= Virginia's 18th Senate district =

American legislative district

Virginia's 18th State Senate district
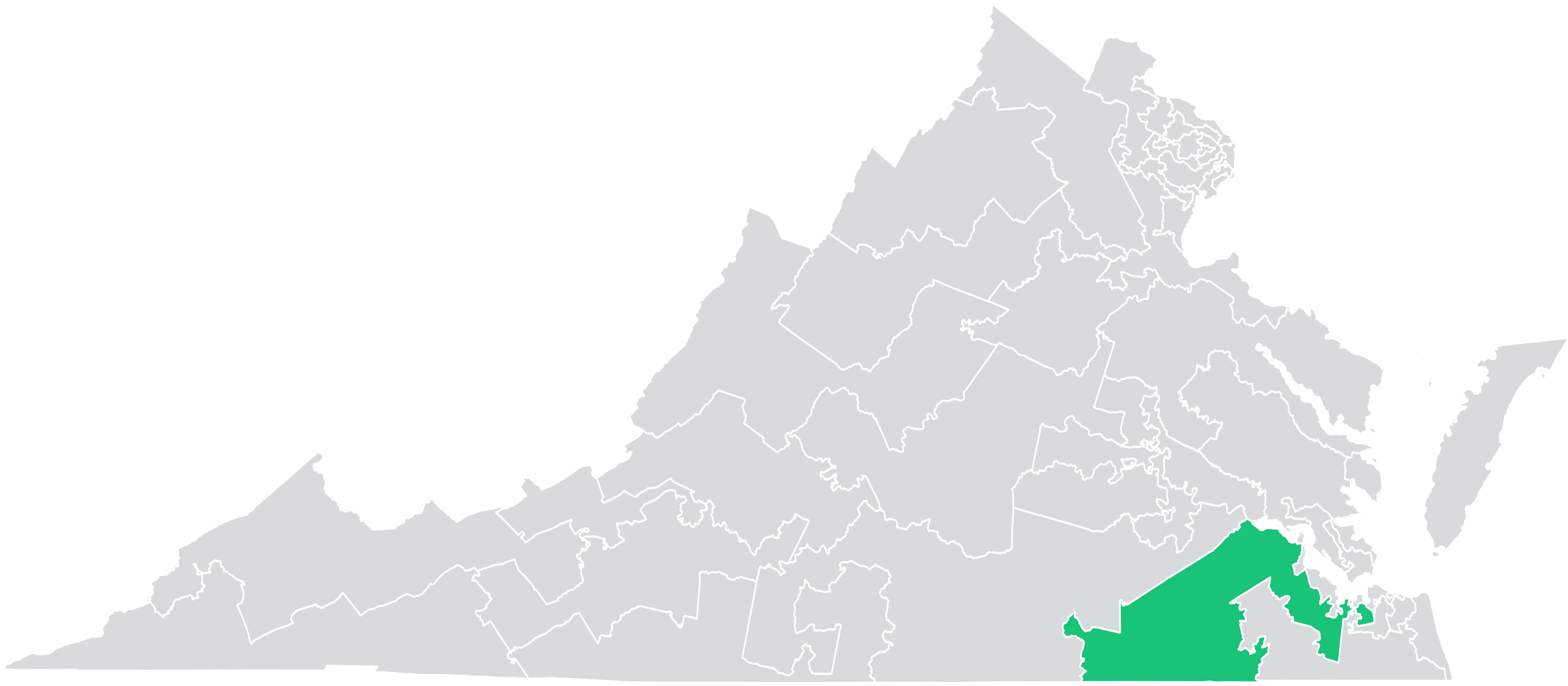
Senator
Louise Lucas; D–Portsmouth
- Demographics: 38% White; 53% Black; 4% Hispanic; 1% Asian; 3% Other
- Population (2019): 202,154
- Registered voters: 138,716

Virginia's 18th Senate district is one of 40 districts in the Senate of Virginia. It has been represented by Democrat Louise Lucas since 1992.

== Geography ==
District 18 is located in southeastern Virginia, including nearly all of the City of Portsmouth and parts of the City of Chesapeake.

The district overlaps with Virginia's 2nd and 3rd congressional districts, and with the 88th, 89th, 91st, and 92nd districts of the Virginia House of Delegates.

== Recent election results ==
=== 2019 ===
2019 Virginia Senate election, District 18
Party	Candidate	Votes	%
Democratic	Louise Lucas (incumbent)	43,021	92.5
Total votes		46,515	100
Democratic hold			

=== 2015 ===
2015 Virginia Senate election, District 18
Party	Candidate	Votes	%
Democratic	Louise Lucas (incumbent)	20,321	95.6
Total votes		21,263	100
Democratic hold			

=== 2011 ===
2011 Virginia Senate election, District 18
Party	Candidate	Votes	%
Democratic	Louise Lucas (incumbent)	23,676	95.9
Total votes		24,681	100
Democratic hold			

=== Federal and statewide results ===
Year	Office	Results
2020	President	Biden 64.6–33.6%
2017	Governor	Northam 65.7–33.3%
2016	President	Clinton 63.5–33.2%
2014	Senate	Warner 66.4–31.8%
2013	Governor	McAuliffe 64.9–30.5%
2012	President	Obama 68.0–31.1%
2012	Senate	Kaine 68.0–32.0%

== Historical results ==
All election results below took place prior to 2011 redistricting, and thus were under different district lines.

=== 2007 ===
2007 Virginia Senate election, District 18
Party	Candidate	Votes	%
Democratic	Louise Lucas (incumbent)	20,260	98.5
Total votes		20,571	100
Democratic hold			

=== 2003 ===
2003 Virginia Senate election, District 18
Party	Candidate	Votes	%
Democratic	Louise Lucas (incumbent)	19,409	69.8
Republican	Walter D. Brown, III	8,383	30.1
Total votes		27,819	100
Democratic hold			

=== 1999 ===
1999 Virginia Senate election, District 18
Party	Candidate	Votes	%
Democratic	Louise Lucas (incumbent)	18,592	99.0
Total votes		18,774	100
Democratic hold			

=== 1995 ===
1995 Virginia Senate election, District 18
Party	Candidate	Votes	%
Democratic	Louise Lucas (incumbent)	23,247	58.4
Independent	Frank M. Slayton	16,534	41.6
Total votes		39,787	100
Democratic hold			
