= 1951 Virginia Senate election =

- November 6, 1951

All 40 seats in the Virginia Senate 21 seats needed for a majority
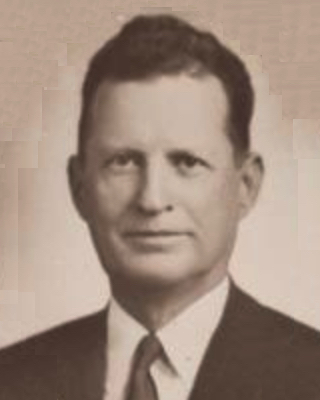

	Majority party	Minority party
Leader	Morton G. Goode (retired)	—
Party	Democratic	Republican
Leader since	January 11, 1950
Leader's seat	8th
Last election	38 seats, 76.98%	2 seats, 21.47%
Seats before	38	2
Seats won	37	3
Popular vote	221,613	61,809
Percentage	79.00%	14.11%
	Third party
Party	Independent
Last election	0 seats, 1.52%
Seats won	0
Popular vote	19,943
Percentage	6.63%
- Democratic hold Republican gain Republican hold Democratic: 50–60% 60–70% 70–80% 80–90% 90–100% Republican: 50–60% 90–100%
President pro tempore before election
Morton G. Goode
Democratic
Elected President pro tempore
Robert C. Vaden
Democratic

Elections to the Virginia Senate were held on November 6, 1951, to elect 40 candidates to the Senate to serve a four-year term. Partisan primaries were held on August 7 to determine nominees for the Democratic Party. The Democrats retained their supermajority in the chamber, winning 37 seats to the Republican Party's three, a gain of one for the Republicans compared to the 1947 general election. One seat, District 16 in southwestern Virginia, changed hands in 1951, electing Republican delegate J. Marion Smith to the Senate over deceased incumbent Democrat Lloyd M. Robinette, who committed suicide just days before the general election and whose name remained on the ballot. Senator Robert C. Vaden of the 13th district was elected President pro tempore of the Senate at the following session.

== Summary ==
District	Seats	Localities represented	Incumbent		Status	Elected	
District	Seats	Localities represented	Senator	Party	Status	Senator	Party
1st	1	Accomack Co. Northampton Co. Princess Anne Co.	Ben T. Gunter Jr.	Democratic	Incumbent retired. Democratic hold.	V. Alfred Etheridge	Democratic
2nd	2	Norfolk City	Robert F. Baldwin Jr.	Democratic	Incumbent re-elected.	Robert F. Baldwin Jr.	Democratic
2nd	2	Norfolk City	Edward L. Breeden Jr.	Democratic	Incumbent re-elected.	Edward L. Breeden Jr.	Democratic
3rd	1	Norfolk City; Portsmouth City; South Norfolk City	Major M. Hillard	Democratic	Incumbent re-elected.	Major M. Hillard	Democratic
4th	1	Amherst Co. Bedford Co. Nelson Co.	I. Paul Wailes	Democratic	Incumbent retired. Democratic hold.	Walter H. Carter	Democratic
5th	1	Isle of Wight Co. Nansemond Co. Southampton Co. Suffolk City	A. S. E. Stephens	Democratic	Incumbent re-elected.	A. S. E. Stephens	Democratic
6th	1	Greensville Co. Hopewell City; Prince George Co. Surry Co. Sussex Co.	Garland Gray	Democratic	Incumbent re-elected.	Garland Gray	Democratic
7th	1	Brunswick Co. Mecklenburg Co.	A. S. Harrison Jr.	Democratic	Incumbent re-elected.	A. S. Harrison Jr.	Democratic
8th	1	Dinwiddie Co. Petersburg City	Morton G. Goode	Democratic	Incumbent retired. Democratic hold.	Benjamin L. Campbell	Democratic
9th	1	Amelia Co. Lunenburg Co. Nottoway Co. Powhatan Co. Prince Edward Co.	George W. Palmer (Note: Succeeded Democrat W. Dennis Kendig in a 1949 special election)	Democratic	Incumbent re-elected.	George W. Palmer	Democratic
10th	1	Halifax Co.	James D. Hagood	Democratic	Incumbent re-elected.	James D. Hagood	Democratic
11th	1	Appomattox Co. Buckingham Co. Charlotte Co. Cumberland Co.	Charles T. Moses	Democratic	Incumbent re-elected.	Charles T. Moses	Democratic
12th	1	Campbell Co. Lynchburg City	Mosby G. Perrow Jr.	Democratic	Incumbent re-elected.	Mosby G. Perrow Jr.	Democratic
13th	2	Danville City; Henry Co. Martinsville City; Patrick Co. Pittsylvania Co.	Robert C. Vaden	Democratic	Incumbent re-elected.	Robert C. Vaden	Democratic
13th	2	Danville City; Henry Co. Martinsville City; Patrick Co. Pittsylvania Co.	Frank P. Burton (Note: Succeeded Democrat Maitland H. Bustard in a 1948 special election)	Democratic	Incumbent re-elected.	Frank P. Burton	Democratic
14th	1	Carroll Co. Floyd Co. Grayson Co.	S. Floyd Landreth	Republican	Incumbent re-elected.	S. Floyd Landreth	Republican
15th	1	Bristol City; Smyth Co. Washington Co.	George M. Warren Jr.	Democratic	Incumbent re-elected.	George M. Warren Jr.	Democratic
16th	1	Lee Co. Scott Co.	Lloyd M. Robinette	Democratic	Incumbent died November 2, 1951, but remained on ballot. Republican gain.	J. Marion Smith	Republican
17th	1	Dickenson Co. Wise Co.	M. M. Long	Democratic	Incumbent re-elected.	M. M. Long	Democratic
18th	1	Buchanan Co. Russell Co. Tazewell Co.	Harry C. Stuart	Democratic	Incumbent re-elected.	Harry C. Stuart	Democratic
19th	1	Bland Co. Giles Co. Pulaski Co. Wythe Co.	C. W. Caudill	Democratic	Incumbent re-elected.	C. W. Caudill	Democratic
20th	1	Alleghany Co. Bath Co. Botetourt Co. Buena Vista City; Clifton Forge City; Craig Co. Rockbridge Co.	J. C. Carpenter Jr.	Democratic	Incumbent re-elected.	J. C. Carpenter Jr.	Democratic
21st	1	Franklin Co. Montgomery Co. Radford City; Roanoke Co.	Ted Dalton	Republican	Incumbent re-elected.	Ted Dalton	Republican
22nd	1	Arlington Co.	Charles R. Fenwick	Democratic	Incumbent re-elected.	Charles R. Fenwick	Democratic
23rd	1	Augusta Co. Highland Co. Staunton City; Waynesboro City	Curry Carter	Democratic	Incumbent re-elected.	Curry Carter	Democratic
24th	1	Harrisonburg City; Page Co. Rappahannock Co. Rockingham Co. Warren Co.	Raymond R. Guest Jr.	Democratic	Incumbent re-elected.	Raymond R. Guest Jr.	Democratic
25th	1	Clarke Co. Frederick Co. Shenandoah Co. Winchester City	Harry F. Byrd Jr.	Democratic	Incumbent re-elected.	Harry F. Byrd Jr.	Democratic
26th	1	Albemarle Co. Charlottesville City; Fluvanna Co. Greene Co. Madison Co.	Edward O. McCue Jr. (Note: Succeeded Democrat John S. Battle in a 1949 special election)	Democratic	Incumbent re-elected.	Edward O. McCue Jr.	Democratic
27th	1	Fredericksburg City; Louisa Co. Orange Co. Spotsylvania Co. Stafford Co.	Benjamin T. Pitts	Democratic	Incumbent re-elected.	Benjamin T. Pitts	Democratic
28th	1	Culpeper Co. Fauquier Co. Loudoun Co.	Robert Y. Button	Democratic	Incumbent re-elected.	Robert Y. Button	Democratic
29th	1	Alexandria City; Fairfax Co. Falls Church City; Prince William Co.	Andrew W. Clarke	Democratic	Incumbent lost renomination. Democratic hold.	John A. K. Donovan	Democratic
30th	1	King George Co. Lancaster Co. Northumberland Co. Richmond Co. Westmoreland Co.	Robert O. Norris Jr.	Democratic	Incumbent re-elected.	Robert O. Norris Jr.	Democratic
31st	1	Caroline Co. Goochland Co. Hanover Co. King William Co.	Thomas H. Blanton	Democratic	Incumbent re-elected.	Thomas H. Blanton	Democratic
32nd	1	Essex Co. Gloucester Co. King and Queen Co. Mathews Co. Middlesex Co. York Co.	William M. Minter	Democratic	Incumbent re-elected.	William M. Minter	Democratic
33rd	1	Elizabeth City Co. Hampton City; Newport News City; Warwick Co.	L. U. Noland	Democratic	Incumbent retired. Democratic hold.	Victor P. Wilson	Democratic
34th	1	Charles City Co. Chesterfield Co. Colonial Heights City; Henrico Co. James City Co. New Kent Co. Williamsburg City	Lloyd C. Bird	Democratic	Incumbent re-elected.	Lloyd C. Bird	Democratic
35th	3	Richmond City	Frank S. Richeson	Democratic	Incumbent re-elected.	Frank S. Richeson	Democratic
35th	3	Richmond City	Charles W. Crowder	Democratic	Incumbent lost renomination. Democratic hold.	G. Edmond Massie	Democratic
35th	3	Richmond City	James E. Gardner	Democratic	Incumbent lost renomination. Democratic hold.	Edward E. Willey	Democratic
36th	1	Roanoke Co.	Earl A. Fitzpatrick	Democratic	Incumbent re-elected.	Earl A. Fitzpatrick	Democratic

== District 1 ==
District 1 Democratic primary 1 to be nominated
Party	Candidate	Votes	%
Democratic	V. Alfred Etheridge		Nominated
Democratic	W. Russell Hatchett		
Total votes			100.00%

District 1 election 1 to be elected
Party	Candidate	Votes	%
Democratic	V. Alfred Etheridge	5,727	93.56%
Write-in	W. Russell Hatchett	394	6.44%
Total votes		6,121	100.00%
Democratic hold			

== District 2 ==
District 2 election 2 to be elected
Party	Candidate	Votes	%
Democratic	Robert F. Baldwin Jr. (incumbent)	6,279	40.42%
Democratic	Edward L. Breeden Jr. (incumbent)	5,432	34.97%
Independent	Grover C. Outland	3,823	24.61%
Total votes		15,534	100.00%
Democratic hold			

== District 3 ==
District 3 Democratic primary 1 to be nominated
Party	Candidate	Votes	%
Democratic	Major M. Hillard (incumbent)		Nominated
Democratic	Earle A. Cadmus		
Total votes			100.00%

District 3 election 1 to be elected
Party	Candidate	Votes	%
Democratic	Major M. Hillard (incumbent)	4,633	99.98%
Write-in		1	0.02%
Total votes		4,634	100.00%
Democratic hold			

== District 4 ==
District 4 Democratic primary 1 to be nominated
Party	Candidate	Votes	%
Democratic	Walter H. Carter		Nominated
Democratic	R. Bolling Lambeth		
Total votes			100.00%

District 4 election 1 to be elected
Party	Candidate	Votes	%
Democratic	Walter H. Carter	3,903	99.90%
Write-in		4	0.10%
Total votes		3,907	100.00%
Democratic hold			

== District 5 ==
District 5 election 1 to be elected
Party	Candidate	Votes	%
Democratic	A. S. E. Stephens (incumbent)	2,681	90.06%
Write-in	Willis E. Cohoon	293	9.84%
Write-in		3	0.10%
Total votes		2,977	100.00%
Democratic hold			

== District 6 ==
District 6 election 1 to be elected
Party	Candidate	Votes	%
Democratic	Garland Gray (incumbent)	3,342	100.00%
Total votes		3,342	100.00%
Democratic hold			

== District 7 ==
District 7 election 1 to be elected
Party	Candidate	Votes	%
Democratic	A. S. Harrison Jr. (incumbent)	1,344	100.00%
Total votes		1,344	100.00%
Democratic hold			

== District 8 ==
District 8 election 1 to be elected
Party	Candidate	Votes	%
Democratic	Benjamin L. Campbell	1,828	100.00%
Total votes		1,828	100.00%
Democratic hold			

== District 9 ==
District 9 election 1 to be elected
Party	Candidate	Votes	%
Democratic	George W. Palmer (incumbent)	1,689	100.00%
Total votes		1,689	100.00%
Democratic hold			

== District 10 ==
District 10 election 1 to be elected
Party	Candidate	Votes	%
Democratic	James D. Hagood (incumbent)	1,364	100.00%
Total votes		1,364	100.00%
Democratic hold			

== District 11 ==
District 11 election 1 to be elected
Party	Candidate	Votes	%
Democratic	Charles T. Moses (incumbent)	1,518	100.00%
Total votes		1,518	100.00%
Democratic hold			

== District 12 ==
District 12 Democratic primary 1 to be nominated
Party	Candidate	Votes	%
Democratic	Mosby G. Perrow Jr. (incumbent)		Nominated
Democratic	Robert Boyer		
Total votes			100.00%

District 12 election 1 to be elected
Party	Candidate	Votes	%
Democratic	Mosby G. Perrow Jr. (incumbent)	2,682	100.00%
Total votes		2,682	100.00%
Democratic hold			

== District 13 ==
District 13 election 2 to be elected
Party	Candidate	Votes	%
Democratic	Frank P. Burton (incumbent)	6,233	51.44%
Democratic	Robert C. Vaden (incumbent)	5,885	48.56%
Total votes		12,118	100.00%
Democratic hold			

== District 14 ==
District 14 election 1 to be elected
Party	Candidate	Votes	%
Republican	S. Floyd Landreth (incumbent)	10,718	99.94%
Write-in		6	0.06%
Total votes		10,724	100.00%
Republican hold			

== District 15 ==
District 15 election 1 to be elected
Party	Candidate	Votes	%
Democratic	George M. Warren Jr. (incumbent)	9,422	99.99%
Write-in		1	0.01%
Total votes		9,423	100.00%
Democratic hold			

== District 16 ==
District 16 election 1 to be elected
Party	Candidate	Votes	%
Republican	J. Marion Smith	10,383	51.95%
Democratic	Lloyd M. Robinette† (incumbent)	9,605	48.05%
Total votes		9,423	100.00%
Republican gain from Democratic			

== District 17 ==
District 17 election 1 to be elected
Party	Candidate	Votes	%
Democratic	M. M. Long (incumbent)	9,595	99.67%
Write-in		32	0.33%
Total votes		9,627	100.00%
Democratic hold			

== District 18 ==
District 18 election 1 to be elected
Party	Candidate	Votes	%
Democratic	Harry C. Stuart (incumbent)	9,839	55.59%
Independent	John W. Fletcher	7,861	44.41%
Total votes		17,700	100.00%
Democratic hold			

== District 19 ==
District 19 election 1 to be elected
Party	Candidate	Votes	%
Democratic	C. W. Caudill (incumbent)	9,044	99.93%
Write-in		6	0.07%
Total votes		9,050	100.00%
Democratic hold			

== District 20 ==
District 20 Democratic primary 1 to be nominated
Party	Candidate	Votes	%
Democratic	J. C. Carpenter Jr. (incumbent)		Nominated
Democratic	Eldon K. Crowder		
Total votes			100.00%

District 20 election 1 to be elected
Party	Candidate	Votes	%
Democratic	J. C. Carpenter Jr. (incumbent)	9,810	99.91%
Write-in		9	0.09%
Total votes		9,819	100.00%
Democratic hold			

== District 21 ==
District 21 Democratic primary 1 to be nominated
Party	Candidate	Votes	%
Democratic	Fred L. Hoback		Nominated
Democratic	John B. Spiers		
Total votes			100.00%

District 21 election 1 to be elected
Party	Candidate	Votes	%
Republican	Ted Dalton (incumbent)	9,184	59.43%
Democratic	Fred L. Hoback	6,269	40.57%
Total votes		15,453	100.00%
Republican hold			

== District 22 ==
District 22 election 1 to be elected
Party	Candidate	Votes	%
Democratic	Charles R. Fenwick (incumbent)	8,902	57.38%
Republican	Oren R. Lewis	6,613	42.62%
Total votes		15,515	100.00%
Democratic hold			

== District 23 ==
District 23 election 1 to be elected
Party	Candidate	Votes	%
Democratic	Curry Carter (incumbent)	2,529	99.96%
Write-in		1	0.04%
Total votes		2,530	100.00%
Democratic hold			

== District 24 ==
District 24 election 1 to be elected
Party	Candidate	Votes	%
Democratic	Raymond R. Guest Jr. (incumbent)	10,503	80.56%
Independent	Eugene N. Beard	2,531	19.41%
Write-in		3	0.02%
Total votes		13,037	100.00%
Democratic hold			

== District 25 ==
District 25 election 1 to be elected
Party	Candidate	Votes	%
Democratic	Harry F. Byrd Jr. (incumbent)	6,102	100.00%
Total votes		6,102	100.00%
Democratic hold			

== District 26 ==
District 26 Democratic primary 1 to be nominated
Party	Candidate	Votes	%
Democratic	Edward O. McCue Jr. (incumbent)		Nominated
Democratic	Joseph T. Henley		
Total votes			100.00%

District 26 election 1 to be elected
Party	Candidate	Votes	%
Democratic	Edward O. McCue Jr. (incumbent)	3,149	99.72%
Write-in		9	0.28%
Total votes		3,158	100.00%
Democratic hold			

== District 27 ==
District 27 election 1 to be elected
Party	Candidate	Votes	%
Democratic	Benjamin T. Pitts (incumbent)	4,892	99.96%
Write-in		2	0.04%
Total votes		4,894	100.00%
Democratic hold			

== District 28 ==
District 28 election 1 to be elected
Party	Candidate	Votes	%
Democratic	Robert Y. Button (incumbent)	3,300	100.00%
Total votes		3,300	100.00%
Democratic hold			

== District 29 ==
District 29 Democratic primary 1 to be nominated
Party	Candidate	Votes	%
Democratic	John K. A. Donovan		Nominated
Democratic	Andrew W. Clarke (incumbent)		
Total votes			100.00%

District 29 election 1 to be elected
Party	Candidate	Votes	%
Democratic	John K. A. Donovan	10,237	65.00%
Republican	Nathan J. Paulson	5,511	34.99%
Write-in		1	0.01%
Total votes		15,749	100.00%
Democratic hold			

== District 30 ==
District 30 election 1 to be elected
Party	Candidate	Votes	%
Democratic	Robert O. Norris Jr. (incumbent)	3,802	100.00%
Total votes		3,802	100.00%
Democratic hold			

== District 31 ==
District 31 election 1 to be elected
Party	Candidate	Votes	%
Democratic	Thomas H. Blanton (incumbent)	1,995	100.00%
Total votes		1,995	100.00%
Democratic hold			

== District 32 ==
District 32 election 1 to be elected
Party	Candidate	Votes	%
Democratic	William M. Minter (incumbent)	3,513	100.00%
Total votes		3,513	100.00%
Democratic hold			

== District 33 ==
District 33 Democratic primary 1 to be elected
Party	Candidate	Votes	%
Democratic	Victor P. Wilson		Nominated
Democratic	G. Alvin Massenburg		
Total votes			100.00%

District 33 election 1 to be elected
Party	Candidate	Votes	%
Democratic	Victor P. Wilson	3,679	100.00%
Total votes		3,679	100.00%
Democratic hold			

== District 34 ==
District 34 Democratic primary 1 to be nominated
Party	Candidate	Votes	%
Democratic	Lloyd C. Bird (incumbent)		Nominated
Democratic	C. Virgil Featherson		
Total votes			100.00%

District 34 election 1 to be elected
Party	Candidate	Votes	%
Democratic	Lloyd C. Bird (incumbent)	3,206	100.00%
Total votes		3,206	100.00%
Democratic hold			

== District 35 ==
District 35 Democratic primary 3 to be nominated
Party	Candidate	Votes	%
Democratic	Frank S. Richeson (incumbent)		Nominated
Democratic	G. Edmond Massie		Nominated
Democratic	Edward E. Willey		Nominated
Democratic	Charles W. Crowder (incumbent)		
Democratic	James E. Gardner (incumbent)		
Democratic	Alvin V. Leake		
Democratic	Beeacher E. Stallard		
Total votes			100.00%

District 35 election 3 to be elected
Party	Candidate	Votes	%
Democratic	G. Edmond Massie	17,786	30.57%
Democratic	Frank S. Richeson (incumbent)	17,502	30.09%
Democratic	Edward E. Willey	17,154	29.49%
Independent	Howard H. Carwile	5,728	9.85%
Write-in		4	0.01%
Total votes		58,174	100.00%
Democratic hold			

== District 36 ==
District 36 Democratic primary 1 to be nominated
Party	Candidate	Votes	%
Democratic	Earl A. Fitzpatrick (incumbent)		Nominated
Democratic	Arnold Schlossberg		
Total votes			100.00%
Democratic hold			

District 36 election 1 to be elected
Party	Candidate	Votes	%
Democratic	Earl A. Fitzpatrick (incumbent)	1,122	99.29%
Write-in		8	0.71%
Total votes		1,130	100.00%
Democratic hold			

== See also ==
- 1951 Virginia House of Delegates election
