= 1947 Virginia Senate election =

- November 4, 1947

All 40 seats in the Virginia Senate 21 seats needed for a majority
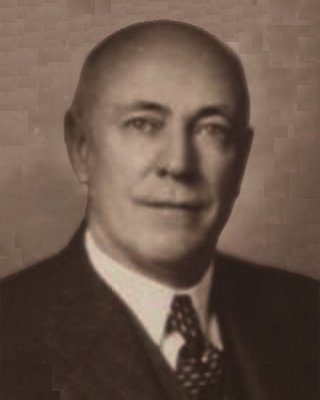

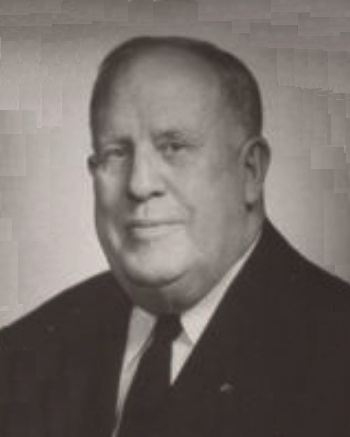
	Majority party	Minority party
Leader	Robert O. Norris Jr.	S. Floyd Landreth
Party	Democratic	Republican
Leader since	January 10, 1945	1944
Leader's seat	30th	14th
Last election	39 seats	1 seat
Seats before	38	2
Seats won	38	2
Popular vote	221,613	61,809
Percentage	76.98%	21.47%
- District results by vote share Democratic: 50–60% 60–70% 70–80% 80–90% 90–100% Republican: 50–60% 90–100%
President pro tempore before election
Robert O. Norris Jr.
Democratic
Elected President pro tempore
Robert O. Norris Jr.
Democratic

Elections to the Virginia Senate were held on November 4, 1947, to elect 40 candidates to the Senate to serve a four-year term. The Democratic Party retained their supermajority in the chamber, winning 38 seats to the Republican Party's two. Republicans won one Senate seat at the 1943 general election.

== Special elections ==
=== District 21 ===
A special election to fill a vacancy in the Senate's 21st district caused by the resignation of Democrat Harvey B. Apperson was held on February 1, 1944. Republican Ted Dalton flipped the seat as a write-in candidate.

District 21 special election, 1944 1 to be elected
Party	Candidate	Votes	%
Write-in	Theodore Roosevelt Dalton	2,870	36.48%
Democratic	Frederick L. Holback	2,786	35.41%
Democratic	J. Bradie Allman	1,121	14.25%
Democratic	S. M. Chitwood	746	9.48%
Democratic	Robert J. Noell	344	4.37%
Total votes		7,867	100.00%
Republican gain from Democratic			

== Summary ==
The following candidates were returned at the general election:

- 1st (Accomack Co., Northampton Co., Princess Anne Co.): Ben T. Gunter Jr. (D)
- 2nd, 2 members (Norfolk City):
  - Robert F. Baldwin Jr. (D)
  - Edward L. Breeden Jr. (D)
- 3rd (Norfolk City, Portsmouth City, South Norfolk City): Major M. Hillard (D)
- 4th (Amherst Co., Bedford Co., Nelson Co.): I. Paul Wailes (D)
- 5th (Isle of Wight Co., Nansemond Co., Southampton Co., Suffolk City): A. S. E. Stephens (D)
- 6th (Greensville Co., Hopewell City, Prince George Co., Surry Co., Sussex Co.): Garland Gray (D)
- 7th (Brunswick Co., Mecklenburg Co.): A. S. Harrison Jr. (D)
- 8th (Dinwiddie Co., Petersburg City): Morton G. Goode (D)
- 9th (Amelia Co., Lunenburg Co., Nottoway Co., Powhatan Co., Prince Edward Co.): D. W. Kendig (D)
- 10th (Halifax Co.): J. D. Hagood (D)
- 11th (Appomattox Co., Buckingham Co., Charlotte Co., Cumberland Co.): Charles T. Moses (D)
- 12th (Campbell Co., Lynchburg City): Mosby G. Perrow Jr. (D)
- 13th, 2 members (Danville City, Henry Co., Martinsville City, Patrick Co., Pittsylvania Co.):
  - Maitland H. Bustard (D)
  - Robert C. Vaden (D)
- 14th (Carroll Co., Floyd Co., Grayson Co.): S. Floyd Landreth (R)
- 15th (Bristol City, Smyth Co., Washington Co.): George M. Warren Jr. (D)
- 16th (Lee Co., Scott Co.): Lloyd M. Robinette (D)
- 17th (Dickenson Co., Wise Co.): M. M. Long (D)
- 18th (Buchanan Co., Russell Co., Tazewell Co.): Harry C. Stuart (D)
- 19th (Bland Co., Giles Co., Pulaski Co., Wythe Co.): C. W. Caudill (D)
- 20th (Alleghany Co., Bath Co., Botetourt Co., Buena Vista City, Clifton Forge City, Craig Co., Rockbridge Co.): J. C. Carpenter Jr. (D)
- 21st (Franklin Co., Montgomery Co., Radford City, Roanoke Co.): Theodore Roosevelt Dalton (R)
- 22nd (Arlington Co.): Charles R. Fenwick (D)
- 23rd (Augusta Co., Highland Co., Staunton City): Curry Carter (D)
- 24th (Harrisonburg City, Page Co., Rappahannock Co., Rockingham Co., Warren Co.): Raymond R. Guest Jr. (D)
- 25th (Clarke Co., Frederick Co., Shenandoah Co., Winchester City): Harry F. Byrd Jr. (D)
- 26th (Albemarle Co., Charlottesville City, Fluvanna Co., Greene Co., Madison Co.): John S. Battle (D)
- 27th (Fredericksburg City, Louisa Co., Orange Co., Spotsylvania Co., Stafford Co.): Benjamin T. Pitts (D)
- 28th (Culpeper Co., Fauquier Co., Loudoun Co.): Robert Y. Button (D)
- 29th (Alexandria City, Fairfax Co., Prince William Co.): Andrew W. Clarke (D)
- 30th (King George Co., Lancaster Co., Northumberland Co., Richmond Co., Westmoreland Co.): R. O. Norris Jr. (D)
- 31st (Caroline Co., Goochland Co., Hanover Co., King William Co.): Thomas H. Blanton (D)
- 32nd (Essex Co., Gloucester Co., King and Queen Co., Mathews Co., Middlesex Co., York Co.): W. M. Minter (D)
- 33rd (Elizabeth City Co., Hampton City, Newport News City, Warwick Co.): L. U. Noland (D)
- 34th (Charles City Co., Chesterfield Co., Henrico Co., James City Co., New Kent Co., Williamsburg City): Lloyd C. Bird (D)
- 35th, 3 members (Richmond Co.):
  - James E. Gardner (D)
  - Charles W. Crowder (D)
  - Frank S. Richeson (D)
- 36th (Roanoke Co.): Earl A. Fitzpatrick (D)

== District 1 ==
District 1 election 1 to be elected
Party	Candidate	Votes	%
Democratic	Ben T. Gunter Jr.	2,101	100.00%
Total votes		2,101	100.00%

== District 2 ==
District 2 election 2 to be elected
Party	Candidate	Votes	%
Democratic	Robert F. Baldwin Jr.	1,921	50.07%
Democratic	Edward L. Breeden Jr.	1,916	49.93%
Total votes		3,837	100.00%

== District 3 ==
District 3 election 1 to be elected
Party	Candidate	Votes	%
Democratic	Major M. Hillard	2,203	77.08%
Republican	S. Edward Blair	654	22.88%
Write-in		1	0.03%
Total votes		2,858	100.00%

== District 4 ==
District 4 election 1 to be elected
Party	Candidate	Votes	%
Democratic	I. Paul Wailes	3,516	68.44%
Republican	S. P. Stewart	1,621	31.56%
Total votes		5,137	100.00%

== District 5 ==
District 5 election 1 to be elected
Party	Candidate	Votes	%
Democratic	A. S. E. Stephens	2,255	99.96%
Write-in		1	0.04%
Total votes		2,256	100.00%

== District 6 ==
District 6 election 1 to be elected
Party	Candidate	Votes	%
Democratic	Garland Gray	1,954	100.00%
Total votes		1,954	100.00%

== District 7 ==
District 7 election 1 to be elected
Party	Candidate	Votes	%
Democratic	A. S. Harrison Jr.	1,690	100.00%
Total votes		1,690	100.00%

== District 8 ==
District 8 election 1 to be elected
Party	Candidate	Votes	%
Democratic	Morton G. Goode	795	100.00%
Total votes		795	100.00%

== District 9 ==
District 9 election 1 to be elected
Party	Candidate	Votes	%
Democratic	D. W. Kendig	3,457	100.00%
Total votes		3,457	100.00%

== District 10 ==
District 10 election 1 to be elected
Party	Candidate	Votes	%
Democratic	J. D. Hagood	1,109	100.00%
Total votes		1,109	100.00%

== District 11 ==
District 11 election 1 to be elected
Party	Candidate	Votes	%
Democratic	Charles T. Moses	1,709	100.00%
Total votes		1,709	100.00%

== District 12 ==
District 12 election 1 to be elected
Party	Candidate	Votes	%
Democratic	Mosby G. Perrow Jr.	1,360	100.00%
Total votes		1,360	100.00%

== District 13 ==
District 13 election 2 to be elected
Party	Candidate	Votes	%
Democratic	Robert C. Vaden	6,497	51.82%
Democratic	Maitland H. Bustard	6,040	48.18%
Total votes		12,537	100.00%

== District 14 ==
District 14 election 1 to be elected
Party	Candidate	Votes	%
Republican	S. Floyd Landreth	8,919	100.00%
Total votes		8,919	100.00%

== District 15 ==
District 15 election 1 to be elected
Party	Candidate	Votes	%
Democratic	George M. Warren Jr.	6,744	54.95%
Republican	Homer C. McFaddin	5,528	45.05%
Total votes		12,272	100.00%

== District 16 ==
District 16 election 1 to be elected
Party	Candidate	Votes	%
Democratic	Lloyd M. Robinette	9,211	52.38%
Republican	C. S. Pendleton Sr.	8,375	47.62%
Total votes		17,586	100.00%

== District 17 ==
District 17 election 1 to be elected
Party	Candidate	Votes	%
Democratic	M. M. Long	9,618	99.98%
Write-in		2	0.02%
Total votes		9,620	100.00%

== District 18 ==
District 18 election 1 to be elected
Party	Candidate	Votes	%
Democratic	Harry C. Stuart	8,198	51.11%
Republican	T. C. Bowen Jr.	7,842	48.89%
Total votes		16,040	100.00%

== District 19 ==
District 19 election 1 to be elected
Party	Candidate	Votes	%
Democratic	C. W. Caudill	8,351	99.56%
Write-in	W. B. Snidow	37	0.44%
Total votes		8,388	100.00%

== District 20 ==
District 20 election 1 to be elected
Party	Candidate	Votes	%
Democratic	J. C. Carpenter Jr.	8,671	99.82%
Write-in		16	0.18%
Total votes		8,687	100.00%

== District 21 ==
District 21 election 1 to be elected
Party	Candidate	Votes	%
Republican	Theodore Roosevelt Dalton	7,247	50.81%
Democratic	Benjamin E. Chapman	7,016	49.19%
Total votes		14,263	100.00%

== District 22 ==
District 22 election 1 to be elected
Party	Candidate	Votes	%
Democratic	Charles R. Fenwick	7,918	64.35%
Independent	Talmage Wilcher	4,387	35.65%
Total votes		12,305	100.00%

== District 23 ==
District 23 election 1 to be elected
Party	Candidate	Votes	%
Democratic	Curry Carter	4,610	100.00%
Total votes		4,610	100.00%

== District 24 ==
District 24 election 1 to be elected
Party	Candidate	Votes	%
Democratic	Raymond R. Guest Jr.	8,120	54.43%
Republican	J. A. Garber	6,797	45.57%
Total votes		14,917	100.00%

== District 25 ==
District 25 election 1 to be elected
Party	Candidate	Votes	%
Democratic	Harry F. Byrd Jr.	4,739	100.00%
Total votes		4,739	100.00%

== District 26 ==
District 26 election 1 to be elected
Party	Candidate	Votes	%
Democratic	John S. Battle	2,969	100.00%
Total votes		2,969	100.00%

== District 27 ==
District 27 election 1 to be elected
Party	Candidate	Votes	%
Democratic	Benjamin T. Pitts	4,667	100.00%
Total votes		4,667	100.00%

== District 28 ==
District 28 election 1 to be elected
Party	Candidate	Votes	%
Democratic	Robert Y. Button	2,228	100.00%
Total votes		2,228	100.00%

== District 29 ==
District 29 election 1 to be elected
Party	Candidate	Votes	%
Democratic	Andrew W. Clarke	7,084	70.65%
Republican	Thomas C. Graham	2,943	29.35%
Total votes		10,027	100.00%

== District 30 ==
District 30 election 1 to be elected
Party	Candidate	Votes	%
Democratic	R. O. Norris Jr.	3,005	72.55%
Republican	Stanley G. Adams	1,137	27.45%
Total votes		4,142	100.00%

== District 31 ==
District 31 election 1 to be elected
Party	Candidate	Votes	%
Democratic	Thomas H. Blanton	2,040	100.00%
Total votes		2,040	100.00%

== District 32 ==
District 32 election 1 to be elected
Party	Candidate	Votes	%
Democratic	W. M. Minter	2,762	100.00%
Total votes		2,762	100.00%

== District 33 ==
District 33 election 1 to be elected
Party	Candidate	Votes	%
Democratic	L. U. Noland	4,279	99.51%
Write-in	Stanley Garner	15	0.35%
Write-in	Lewis A. McMurran Jr.	1	0.02%
Write-in	E. D. Shaffer	1	0.02%
Write-in		4	0.09%
Total votes		4,300	100.00%

== District 34 ==
District 34 election 1 to be elected
Party	Candidate	Votes	%
Democratic	Lloyd C. Bird	4,470	100.00%
Total votes		4,470	100.00%

== District 35 ==
District 35 election 3 to be elected
Party	Candidate	Votes	%
Democratic	James E. Gardner	22,483	29.77%
Democratic	Charles W. Crowder	22,084	29.24%
Democratic	Frank S. Richeson	20,204	26.75%
Republican	Vernon G. Browning	10,746	14.23%
Total votes		75,517	100.00%

== District 36 ==
District 36 election 1 to be elected
Party	Candidate	Votes	%
Democratic	Earl A. Fitzpatrick	1,619	99.57%
Write-in		7	0.43%
Total votes		1,626	100.00%

== See also ==
- 1947 Virginia House of Delegates election
