= 1967 Virginia Senate election =

- 7 November 1967

All 40 seats in the Senate of Virginia 21 (Note: A majority of 20 was also possible for Democrats as the Lieutenant Governor of Virginia, a Democrat at the time, held the tie-breaker vote.) seats needed for a majority
	Majority party	Minority party
Leader	James D. Hagood
Party	Democratic	Republican
Leader's seat	4th
Seats won	33	6
Seat change	▼2	▲2
President pro tempore before election
James D. Hagood
Democratic
Elected President pro tempore
James D. Hagood
Democratic

The 1967 Virginia Senate election was held on 7 November 1967, concurrently with elections for the Virginia House of Delegates, to elect senators to all 40 seats in the Senate of Virginia. The Democratic Party retained control of the Senate, winning 32 seats to the Republican Party's 6, an increase of 2 seats from the previous election.

== District 1 ==
1967 Virginia's 1st Senate district election
Party	Candidate	Votes	%
Democratic	William Earl Fears	9,738	99.9
Write-in		9	0.1
Total votes		9,747	100.00%
Democratic hold			

== District 2 ==
1967 Virginia's 2nd Senate district election
Party	Candidate	Votes	%
Democratic	Peter K. Babalas	12,619	21.1
Democratic	Henry E. Howell Jr.	12,453	20.8
Democratic	Edward L. Breeden Jr.	12,212	20.4
Republican	Robert G. Doumar	6,976	11.7
Republican	L. S. Parsons Jr.	6,690	11.2
Republican	Wayne Lustig	5,671	9.5
Independent	William I. McKendree	3,152	5.3
Total votes		59,773	100.00%
Democratic hold			
Democratic hold			
Democratic hold			

== District 3 ==
1967 Virginia's 3rd Senate district election
Party	Candidate	Votes	%
Democratic	Willard J. Moody	21,127	31.0
Democratic	William H. Hodges	21,103	30.9
Democratic	Edward T. Caton III	20,594	30.2
Independent	George R. Walker	3,152	7.9
Write-in		50	0.07
Total votes		68,255	100.00%
Democratic hold			
Democratic hold			
Democratic hold			

== District 4 ==
1967 Virginia's 4th Senate district election
Party	Candidate	Votes	%
Democratic	James D. Hagood	12,261	100
Write-in		1	0
Total votes		12,262	100.00%
Democratic hold			

== District 5 ==
1967 Virginia's 5th Senate district election
Party	Candidate	Votes	%
Democratic	William V. Rawlings	9,914	100
Write-in		12	0.01
Total votes		9,926	100.00%
Democratic hold			

== District 6 ==
1967 Virginia's 6th Senate district election
Party	Candidate	Votes	%
Democratic	Garland Gray	12,998	70.8
Independent	Curtis W. Harris	5,353	29.2
Write-in		2	0
Total votes		9,926	100.00%
Democratic hold			

== District 7 ==
1967 Virginia's 7th Senate district election
Party	Candidate	Votes	%
Democratic	Joseph C. Hutcheson	7,876	99.9
Write-in		11	0.1
Total votes		7,887	100.00%
Democratic hold			

== District 8 ==
1967 Virginia's 8th Senate district election
Party	Candidate	Votes	%
Democratic	Robert C. Fitzgerald	44,836	58.0
Unknown	Richard H. Gentry	32,448	42.0
Total votes		77,284	100.00%
Democratic hold			

== District 9 ==
1967 Virginia's 9th Senate district election
Party	Candidate	Votes	%
Democratic	Charles R. Fenwick	17,262	64.6
Unknown	Daniel J. Smith	9,471	35.4
Write-in		2	0
Total votes		26,735	100.00%
Democratic hold			

== District 10 ==
1967 Virginia's 10th Senate district election
Party	Candidate	Votes	%
Democratic	James W. Davis	11,446	99.9
Write-in		12	0.1
Total votes		11,458	100.00%
Democratic hold			

== District 11 ==
1967 Virginia's 11th Senate district election
Party	Candidate	Votes	%
Republican	Robert S. Burruss Jr.	9,396	99.9
Write-in		3	0.1
Total votes		9,399	100.00%
Republican hold			

== District 12 ==
1967 Virginia's 12th Senate district election
Party	Candidate	Votes	%
Democratic	William F. Stone	22,126	33.2
Democratic	W. Carrington Thompson	20,325	30.5
Republican	Charles A. Womack	14,203	21.3
Republican	D. Lurton Arey	9,980	15.0
Write-in		74	0.1
Total votes		66,708	100.00%
Democratic hold			
Democratic hold			

== District 13 ==
1967 Virginia's 13th Senate district election
Party	Candidate	Votes	%
Republican	James C. Turk	17,844	65.0
Democratic	Raleigh M. Cooley	9,621	35.0
Total votes		27,465	100.00%
Republican hold			

== District 14 ==
1967 Virginia's 14th Senate district election
Party	Candidate	Votes	%
Democratic	George M. Warren Jr.	18,646	54.9
Republican	Harry P. Rowlett	15,292	45.1
Total votes		33,938	100.00%
Democratic hold			

== District 15 ==
1967 Virginia's 15th Senate district election
Party	Candidate	Votes	%
Democratic	Macon M. Long	15,631	50.8
Republican	Kline R. Powers	15,125	49.2
Total votes		30,756	100.00%
Democratic hold			

== District 16 ==
1967 Virginia's 16th Senate district election
Party	Candidate	Votes	%
Republican	George F. Barnes	15,021	54.8
Democratic	R. Crockett Gwyn	12,370	45.2
Total votes		27,391	100.00%
Republican hold			

== District 17 ==
1967 Virginia's 17th Senate district election
Party	Candidate	Votes	%
Democratic	D. Woodrow Bird	13,903	51.8
Republican	T. Rodman Layman	12,947	48.2
Total votes		26,850	100.00%
Democratic hold			

== District 18 ==
1967 Virginia's 18th Senate district election
Party	Candidate	Votes	%
Republican	H. Clyde Pearson	14,514	56.4
Democratic	Hale Collins	11,204	43.6
Total votes		25,718	100.00%
Republican hold			

== District 19 ==
1967 Virginia's 19th Senate district election
Party	Candidate	Votes	%
Republican	H. Dunlop Dawbarn	12,158	56.0
Democratic	George M. Cochran	9,557	44.0
Total votes		21,715	100.00%
Republican hold			

== District 20 ==
1967 Virginia's 20th Senate district election
Party	Candidate	Votes	%
Democratic	George S. Aldhizer, II	13,182	53.7
Republican	V. Stephen Bradshaw	11,376	46.3
Total votes		24,558	100.00%
Democratic hold			

== District 21 ==
1967 Virginia's 21st Senate district election
Party	Candidate	Votes	%
Republican	James Kenneth Robinson	20,043	99.9
Write-in		23	0.1
Total votes		24,558	100.00%
Republican hold			

== District 22 ==
1967 Virginia's 22nd Senate district election
Party	Candidate	Votes	%
Democratic	James Harry Michael Jr.	11,133	99.9
Write-in		9	0.1
Total votes		11,142	100.00%
Democratic hold			

== District 23 ==
1967 Virginia's 23rd Senate district election
Party	Candidate	Votes	%
Democratic	Paul W. Manns	15,589	99.9
Write-in		9	0.1
Total votes		15,598	100.00%
Democratic hold			

== District 24 ==
1967 Virginia's 24th Senate district election
Party	Candidate	Votes	%
Democratic	Omer L. Hirst	27,299	26.9
Democratic	Adelard L. Brault	26,296	25.9
Democratic	John N. Beall Jr.	24,923	24.6
Unknown	George Falck	22,963	22.6
Write-in		1	0.0
Total votes		101,482	100.00%
Democratic hold			
Democratic hold			
Democratic hold			

== District 25 ==
1967 Virginia's 25th Senate district election
Party	Candidate	Votes	%
Democratic	John Galleher	14,038	99.9
Write-in		32	0.1
Total votes		14,070	100.00%
Democratic hold			

== District 26 ==
1967 Virginia's 26th Senate district election
Party	Candidate	Votes	%
Democratic	Leslie D. Campbell Jr.	12,666	99.9
Write-in		1	0.0
Total votes		12,667	100.00%
Democratic hold			

== District 27 ==
1967 Virginia's 27th Senate district election
Party	Candidate	Votes	%
Democratic	Herbert H. Bateman	6,432	75.4
Republican	Harry E. New	2,093	24.6
Total votes		8,525	100.00%
Democratic hold			

== District 28 ==
1967 Virginia's 28th Senate district election
Party	Candidate	Votes	%
Democratic	Hunter B. Andrews	3,749	99.9
Write-in		21	0.1
Total votes		3,770	100.00%
Democratic hold			

== District 29 ==
1967 Virginia's 29th Senate district election
Party	Candidate	Votes	%
Democratic	Lloyd C. Bird	15,486	60.0
Republican	Henry Sutliff Jr.	10,321	40.0
Write-in		1	0.0
Total votes		25,808	100.00%
Democratic hold			

== District 30 ==
1967 Virginia's 30th Senate district election
Party	Candidate	Votes	%
Democratic	J. Sargeant Reynolds	28,595	40.6
Democratic	Edward E. Willey	21,576	30.7
Republican	Henry Sutliff Jr.	19,023	27.0
Unknown	Harry N. Bradley Jr.	1,186	1.7
Write-in		8	0.1
Total votes		70,388	100.00%
Democratic hold			
Democratic hold			

== District 31 ==
1967 Virginia's 31st Senate district election
Party	Candidate	Votes	%
Democratic	William F. Parkerson Jr.	19,484	99.7
Write-in		50	0.3
Total votes		19,534	100.00%
Democratic hold			

== District 32 ==
1967 Virginia's 32nd Senate district election
Party	Candidate	Votes	%
Democratic	William B. Hopkins	6,891	99.7
Write-in		2	0.0
Total votes		6,893	100.00%
Democratic hold			

== District 33 ==
1967 Virginia's 33rd Senate district election
Party	Candidate	Votes	%
Democratic	Leroy S. Bendheim	6,692	57.5
Republican	Carlyle C. Ring Jr.	4,945	42.5
Total votes		11,637	100.00%
Democratic hold			

== See also ==
- List of Virginia state legislatures
