= Gray Commission =

The Commission on Public Education, known as the VPEC or Gray Commission (after its chair, Virginia state senator Garland Gray), was a 32-member commission established by Governor of Virginia Thomas B. Stanley on August 23, 1954 to study the effects of the U.S. Supreme Court decisions in Brown v. Board of Education issued on May 17, 1954 and May 31, 1955, and to make recommendations. Its counsel were David J. Mays (until December 1957) and his associate Henry T. Wickham.

== Background ==
Even before establishing the commission, Stanley had announced his opposition to the Brown decision. Stanley was allied with U.S. Senator, Harry F. Byrd, head of the Byrd Organization that had long dominated politics in the state, and who as time passed would become more and more staunchly against racial integration, which he rationalized on anti-miscegenation grounds.

The day after Brown I, Stanley had called for "cool heads, calm study, and sound judgment" and said he would write to Byrd, who at first was neither defiant nor conciliatory. But within days, the governor's office was deluged with letters expressing fears about communist plots (this being the McCarthy era and early Cold War) and race mixing. Stanley assured those citizens that schools would remain segregated for the 1954–1955 school year.

On June 20, 1954, twenty legislators from Southside Virginia met in a Petersburg firehouse, called together by state Senator Garland Gray (in whose district the firehouse lay) and declared themselves "unalterably opposed" to racial integration in the schools. They included U.S. Congressmen Watkins Abbitt and Bill Tuck, as well as state senators Gray, Mills Godwin and Albertis Harrison. Four days later many fourth District citizens descended onto the state capitol.

On June 25, 1954, after meeting with other Southern governors in Richmond (and learning about the Petersburg firehouse meeting, but about two months before announcing this commission's membership), Stanley had vowed, "I shall use every legal means at my command to continue segregated schools in Virginia". Section 140 of the State Constitution had specifically provided for racial segregation in public schools. Stanley now proposed repealing Section 129 of the State Constitution, which required the state provide free public schools. Radical segregationists proposed to close public schools to avoid integration, which upset other Virginians.

Because all 32 of Governor Stanley's appointees on August 30, 1954 were legislators (13 senators and 19 delegates), all were male Caucasians. The Virginia Council of Churches had urged Stanley to appoint commissioners of both races, but he announced that a legislative commission would be better because legislators would have to consider and act upon its proposals. Republican Ted Dalton had also called for a nonpartisan biracial commission to work out a desegregation program for Virginia. State superintendent of public instruction Dowell Howard expressed his hope that the problem could be solved gradually.

Stanley's appointees were weighted towards those districts with the largest black communities by percentage, which thus would be most affected by the Supreme Court's rulings. Thus, the 4th and 5th U.S. Congressional districts (Abbitt's and Tuck's) accounted for ten members and the 1st U.S. Congressional district (then represented by ex-football coach Edward J. Robeson Jr.) had five members. All three of those districts were Byrd Organization stronghold and had many counties with more black than white residents, although poll taxes, Jim Crow laws and other tactic restricted blacks' voting power (sometimes those southern and eastern Virginia counties were referred to as "Black Belt"). By that autumn white leaders in those affected communities had formed the Defenders of State Sovereignty and Individual Liberties, which would radicalize their response.

The commission's first meeting was held on September 13, 1954; members elected Gray chairman. Gray then selected an eleven-member executive committee. The full commission decided that all its sessions, as well as those of the executive committee would be closed to the public, although it could hold public hearings.

== Members of the Commission ==
- Garland Gray of Waverly (6th Senatorial District), Chairman
- Harry B. Davis of Norfolk, vice-chairman
- Howard H. Adams of Eastville representing Accomack and Northampton counties
- J. Bradie Allman of Rocky Mount representing Franklin County
- Robert F. Baldwin Jr. of Norfolk (2nd Senatorial District)
- Joseph E. Blackburn of Lynchburg
- Robert Y. Button of Culpeper (27th Senatorial District)
- Orby L. Cantrell of Pound representing Wise and Norton counties
- Russell M. Carneal of Williamsburg representing Charles City, James City, New Kent and York Counties and Williamsburg
- Curry Carter of Staunton (22nd Senatorial District)
- Walter C. Caudill of Pearisburg (19th Senatorial District)
- Charles W. Cleaton of South Hill, representing Mecklenburg County
- John H. Daniel of Charlotte Court House, representing Charlotte and Prince Edward Counties
- Charles R. Fenwick of Arlington (9th Senatorial District)
- Earl A. Fitzpatrick of Roanoke (35th Senatorial District)
- Mills E. Godwin Jr. of Suffolk (5th Senatorial District)
- James D. Hagood of Clover (4th Senatorial District)
- Albertis S. Harrison Jr. of Lawrenceville (7th Senatorial District)
- Charles K. Hutchens of Newport News
- S. Floyd Landreth of Galax (14th Senatorial District) (one of 2 Republicans)
- Baldwin G. Locher of Lexington, representing Rockbridge, Bath and Buena Vista counties
- J. Maynard Magruder of Arlington
- G. Edmond Massie of Richmond (35th Senatorial District)
- William M. Minter of Mathews County ÷(31st Senatorial District)
- W. Tayloe Murphy of Warsaw, representing Nortunberland, Westmoreland, Lancaster and Richmond counties
- Samuel E. Pope of Drewryville, representing Southampton County
- Harold H. Purcell of Louisa (27th Senatorial District)
- James W. Roberts of Norfolk
- Vernon S. Shaffer of Maurertown representing Shenandoah County (one of 2 Republicans)
- W. Roy Smith of Petersburg, representing Petersburg and Dinwiddie County
- J. Randolph Tucker, Jr. of Richmond
- Chase S. Wheatley Jr. of Danville

== Hearings and report ==
The Commission held only one public hearing. That eleven hour session occurred after the elections, on November 14, 1954 in Richmond, and included testimony from over a hundred persons.

The Commission then issued a preliminary report in January 1955, as the next legislative session began, noting popular opposition to integration and pledging to design a program to prevent enforced integration in Virginia's public schools. Basically, it proceeded from an assumption that Brown was both bad law and bad social policy.

Brown II, in which the Supreme Court told school districts to desegregate public schools "with all deliberate speed" was issued on May 31, 1955.

Six months later the Gray Commission issued its 18-page final report, on November 11, 1955, four days after the Virginia Supreme Court in Almond v. Day (which concerned other vouchers) held that Section 141 of the state Constitution barred appropriating public funds to support private schools.

The commission's final suggestions included, but were not limited to:

- Amending the state compulsory attendance law so no white parent need send his or her child to an integrated school
- Pupil placements boards with a local option so that a school board could assign pupils to various public schools, based on factors including availability of facilities and transportation, health, the child's aptitude and the welfare and best interests of other pupils attending that school
- A tuition grant program for parents who wished to send their children to private academies rather than an integrated school

== Criticism and aftermath ==
Even Gray withdrew support because the plan Mays drafted included a local option. Many segregationists wanted any public school allowing segregation to be closed. On November 14, 1955, Governor Stanley called an extra session of the Virginia General Assembly which began on November 30, 1955 and adjourned on December 3, 1955. Virginia's voters overwhelmingly approved a constitutional convention on January 9, 1956 (necessary to amend the constitution to allow private school vouchers), but little legislation was passed in the regular legislative session which began two days later and ended on March 12. Meanwhile, on March 6, 1956 the constitutional convention approved a tuition voucher amendment. The Gray Commission met again in May 1956, but made no additional recommendations. Both segregationists and moderates had come to oppose the original Gray Commission plan, especially after extensive press criticism led by James J. Kilpatrick and after federal judges in July 1956 ordered integration of schools in Norfolk, Arlington and Charlottesville.

Meanwhile, the Gray Commission's executive committee met, and with the assistance of then-attorney general J. Lindsay Almond crafted the more radical Stanley Plan. An initial draft of July 25, 1956 failed to receive the full commission's approval the following day. However, the commission passed a redrafted version by a 19–12 vote on August 22. Governor Stanley had called a special legislative session, which began meeting on August 27. It ultimately passed the Stanley Plan.

However, that defiance produced more litigation, and the existing desegregation lawsuits dragged on. On March 26, 1957, the U.S. Supreme Court upheld lower court orders for desegregation of Arlington and Charlottesville schools, but gave segregationists some hope by denying certiorari a case which denied black children admission to a school in Old Fort, North Carolina using a pupil placement system (and without the school closure provisions of the Stanley Plan). That spring, the NAACP also challenged various aspects of the new Virginia plan which were directed against it and similar to new legislation in other southern states. Those reached the U.S. Supreme Court in 1958 as Scull v. Virginia ex rel. Committee on Law Reform and Racial Activities and Harrison v. NAACP. Meanwhile, Almond brought a "friendly" lawsuit against comptroller Sidney C. Day, seeking the Virginia judiciary's approval of the school voucher plan after the constitutional changes (after he was elected Governor in 1957, his successor as Attorney General, former Gray Commission member Albertis Harrison was substituted in the legal proceeding captions).

On January 19, 1959, both the Virginia Supreme Court in Harrison v. Day and a three judge federal panel in James v. Almond found the Stanley Plan unconstitutional.

== See also ==
- Sibley Commission
