= Valentine M. Sowder =

American politician (1866–1956)

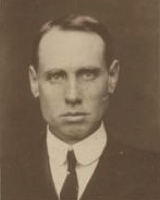

Member of the Virginia Senate from the 26th district
- In office January 10, 1912 – January 12, 1916
- Preceded by: Greenville O. McAlexander
- Succeeded by: Beverly A. Davis

Member of the Virginia House of Delegates from Floyd County
- In office December 2, 1891 – December 6, 1893
- Preceded by: Zebrem Keith
- Succeeded by: Sparrel T. Turner

Personal details
- Born: Valentine Marion Sowder; October 5, 1866 Copper Hill, Virginia, U.S.
- Died: August 18, 1956 (aged 89) Christiansburg, Virginia, U.S.
- Party: Republican
- Spouse: Susan Edwards
- Education: University of Virginia (LLB)

Valentine Marion Sowder (October 5, 1866 – August 18, 1956) was an American Republican politician who served as a member of the Virginia Senate and House of Delegates.

Virginia House of Delegates
Preceded by Zebrem Keith	Virginia Delegate for Floyd County; 1891–1893	Succeeded by Sparrel Tyler Turner
Senate of Virginia
Preceded by Greenville O. McAlexander	Virginia Senator for the 26th District; 1912–1916	Succeeded by Beverly A. Davis
