= Greenville O. McAlexander =

American politician (1871–1940)

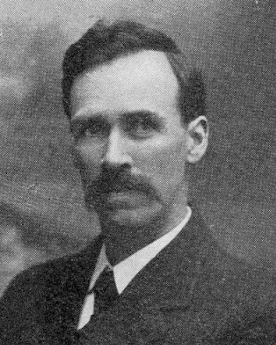

Member of the Virginia Senate from the 26th district
- In office January 8, 1908 – January 10, 1912
- Preceded by: Sparrel T. Turner
- Succeeded by: Valentine M. Sowder

Personal details
- Born: January 15, 1871 Patrick, Virginia, U.S.
- Died: January 4, 1940 (aged 68)
- Party: Republican
- Spouse: Metamora Ingram (m. 1890)

Greenville Osborn McAlexander (January 15, 1871 – January 4, 1940) was an American politician who served as a member of the Virginia Senate. In 1905, he was the Republican nominee for the Virginia House of Delegates for Floyd and Franklin, but he lost to John R. Guerrant by a margin of 115 votes. He was elected to the Senate in 1907 and served one four-year term. He was named a Special Revenue Agent for Virginia, North Carolina, and Tennessee by President William Howard Taft.

Senate of Virginia
Preceded by Sparrel T. Turner	Virginia Senator for the 26th District; 1908–1912	Succeeded by Valentine M. Sowder
