= Beverly A. Davis =

American lawyer and politician

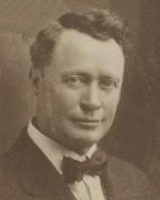

Member of the Virginia Senate from the 26th district
- In office January 12, 1916 – January 14, 1920
- Preceded by: Valentine M. Sowder
- Succeeded by: Samuel G. Proffit

Personal details
- Born: Beverly Andrew Davis; September 27, 1868 Snow Creek, Franklin County, Virginia, U.S.
- Died: May 31, 1944 (aged 75) Roanoke, Virginia, U.S.
- Party: Republican
- Spouse(s): Nettie Barrow; Mary Lee Gravely
- Education: Georgetown University

Beverly Andrew Davis (September 27, 1868 – May 31, 1944) was an American lawyer and Republican politician who served as a member of the Virginia Senate from 1916 to 1920.

In 1902, he ran for Congress against Claude A. Swanson in Virginia's 5th district but lost 60.80 to 37.63%.

Virginia House of Delegates
Preceded by Zebrem Keith	Virginia Delegate for Floyd County; 1891–1893	Succeeded by Sparrel Tyler Turner
Senate of Virginia
Preceded by Valentine M. Sowder	Virginia Senator for the 26th District; 1916–1920	Succeeded by Samuel G. Proffit
