= Robert Vaden =

Robert Vaden is the name of:

- Robert C. Vaden (1882–1954), American businessman and state senator
- Robert Vaden (basketball) (born 1985), American basketball player
