= James A. Dinwiddie =

American politician

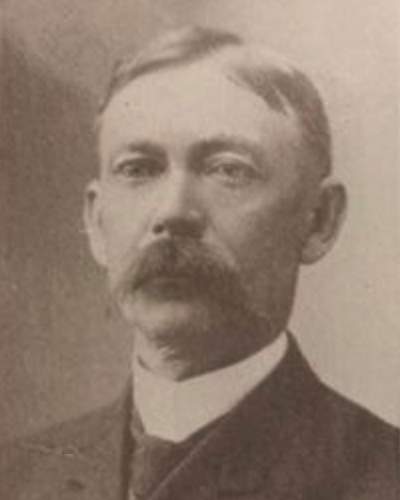
- Portrait of Dinwiddie, c. 1902

Member of the Virginia Senate from the 26th district
- In office December 6, 1899 – January 13, 1904
- Preceded by: William H. Hale
- Succeeded by: Sparrel T. Turner

Personal details
- Born: James Alexander Dinwiddie; February 8, 1855 Lynchburg, Virginia, U.S.
- Died: March 14, 1940 (aged 85) Moneta, Virginia, U.S.
- Party: Republican
- Spouse: Virginia Roberts Craghead

James Alexander Dinwiddie (February 8, 1855 – March 14, 1940) was an American politician who served as a member of the Virginia Senate.

Senate of Virginia
Preceded by William H. Hale	Virginia Senator for the 26th District; 1899–1904	Succeeded by Sparrel T. Turner
