= Sparrel T. Turner =

American politician (1846–1927)

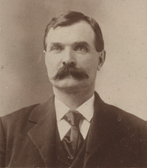

Member of the Virginia Senate from the 26th district
- In office January 13, 1904 – January 8, 1908
- Preceded by: James A. Dinwiddie
- Succeeded by: Greenville O. McAlexander

Member of the Virginia House of Delegates for Floyd and Franklin
- In office December 6, 1893 – December 6, 1899
- Preceded by: Valentine M. Sowder
- Succeeded by: A. Luther Cannaday

Personal details
- Born: Sparrel Tyler Turner; September 19, 1846
- Died: February 24, 1927 (aged 80)
- Party: Republican
- Spouse: Flora Alice Thomas

Military service
- Allegiance: Confederate States
- Branch/service: Confederate States Army
- Years of service: 1864–1865
- Battles/wars: American Civil War

Sparrel Tyler Turner (September 19, 1846 – February 24, 1927) was an American politician who served as a member of the Virginia House of Delegates and Virginia Senate.

Senate of Virginia
Preceded by James A. Dinwiddie	Virginia Senator for the 26th District; 1904–1908	Succeeded by Greenville O. McAlexander
