= 1971 Virginia Senate election =

1971 Virginia Senate elections
- November 2, 1971

All 40 seats in the Senate of Virginia 21 seats needed for a majority
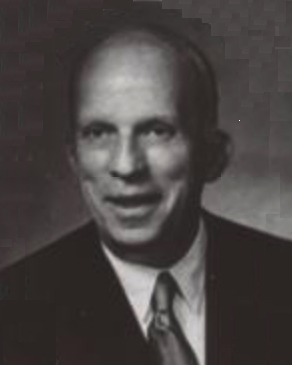

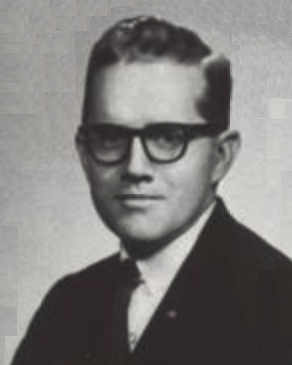
	Majority party	Minority party
Leader	Edward L. Breeden Jr. (retired)	James C. Turk
Party	Democratic	Republican
Leader since	January 21, 1970	January 13, 1965
Leader's seat	5th/6th/7th	37th
Last election	34 seats	6 seats
Seats won	34	6
Seat change	Steady	Steady
Popular vote	557,040	273,477
Percentage	64.5%	31.6%
Majority leader before election
Edward L. Breeden Jr.
Democratic
Elected Majority leader
William B. Hopkins
Democratic

The 1971 Virginia Senate elections were held on November 2, 1971, alongside the Virginia House of Delegates election. All 40 seats in the Senate of Virginia were up for election.

== Overall results ==
↓
34	6
Democratic	Republican

Parties		Seats				Popular Vote		
Parties		1967	1971	+/-	Strength	Vote	%	Change
	Democratic	34	34	Steady	85.00%	557,040	64.45%	
	Republican	6	6	Steady	15.00%	273,477	31.64%	
	Independent	0	0	Steady	0.00%	33,572	3.88%	
-	Write-ins	0	0	Steady	0.00%	172	0.02%	
Total		40	40	0	100.00%	864,261	100.00%	-
