= Senator Pitts =

Senator Pitts may refer to:

- Benjamin T. Pitts (died 1964), Virginia State Senate
- Edmund L. Pitts (1839–1898), New York State Senate
