= Senator Hillard =

Senator Hillard may refer to:

- George Stillman Hillard (1808–1879), Massachusetts State Senate
- Major M. Hillard (1896–1977), Virginia State Senate

== See also ==
- Earl Hilliard (born 1942), Alabama State Senate
- Lyle W. Hillyard (born 1940), Utah State Senate
