= Harold H. Purcell =

American politician and judge

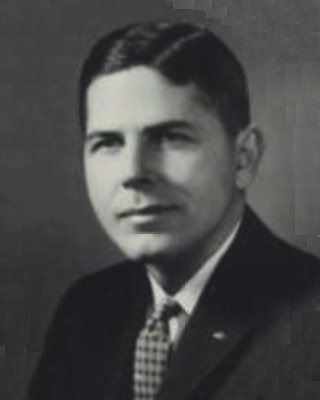

Member of the Virginia Senate from the 25th district
- In office January 8, 1964 – January 12, 1966
- Preceded by: Edward O. McCue Jr.
- Succeeded by: John Galleher

Member of the Virginia Senate from the 26th district
- In office January 28, 1959 – January 8, 1964
- Preceded by: Benjamin T. Pitts
- Succeeded by: John Alexander

Member of the Virginia House of Delegates for Fluvanna, Goochland, and Louisa
- In office January 14, 1948 – January 28, 1959
- Preceded by: Henry S. Johnson
- Succeeded by: Matt G. Anderson

Personal details
- Born: Harold Hidmore Purcell; February 7, 1920 Louisa, Virginia, U.S.
- Died: July 14, 2007 (aged 87) Richmond, Virginia, U.S.
- Party: Democratic
- Spouse: Virginia Omohundro (m. 1942)
- Education: University of Virginia

Military service
- Allegiance: United States
- Branch/service: United States Army
- Years of service: 1942–1945
- Rank: Captain
- Battles/wars: World War II

Harold Hidmore Purcell (February 7, 1920 – July 14, 2007) was an American lawyer, judge and politician affiliated with the Byrd Organization who served in both houses of the Virginia General Assembly representing his native Louisa County and adjacent counties (1948-1965), and later as Circuit Judge for what was then the 16th Judicial Circuit (1966-1979) (also covering Louisa County).

== Early life ==
Born in Louisa County to the former Mary Elizabeth (Bessie) Walton, his father John S. Purcell had moved from nearby Goochland County to operate a store at Bells Cross Roads, which the elder Purcell expanded into a sawmill and wholesale lumber supply business. This man's great-grandfather, John Pedie Purcell, had emigrated from Ireland and moved to Louisa County. His son (this boy's grandfather), Charles Daniel Purcell, had been born in Louisa County and fought with the 23rd Virginia Infantry during the Civil War. John Purcell had been appointed to the Louisa County Board of Supervisors in 1917, and continued to serve until 1923, when Harold was an infant. In 1929, when Harold was still a child, his father was elected a trustee of the Louisa Christian Church, a position which this son would attain decades later. Meanwhile, in 1914 John Purcell became a director of the Bank of Louisa, and in mid-1936 (during the Great Depression) became its president, a position he continued to hold until the corporation was sold to the National Bank and Trust Company of Charlottesville, Virginia. The fourth and longest lived of five sons (the youngest would die in 1954), Purcell also had an elder sister, Emma, whom he outlived.

=== Education ===
Harold Purcell attended the segregated Louisa High School, then Augusta Military Academy before traveling to Charlottesville for college and law school.

=== Military officer ===
During World War II (1942-1945) or (1943-1946), Purcell served as an infantry warrant officer in the U.S. Army, with the rank of captain.

=== Personal life ===
Purcell married Virginia (Blanche) Omohundro (1921-2009), who bore a son, Harold Jr. before 1950, and another son, Charles F. Purcell who became his law partner after his retirement from the bench as described below.

== Career ==
Purcell (and later his son Charles) were lawyers as well as real estate investors in Louisa County. His father had founded Louisa Land & Lumber Corporation and his other son Richard (this man's brother) also became a real estate investor. This man also founded Purcell Land & Lumber Corporation; at one point (with his own son) owning tens of thousands of acres. Purcell was active in the Louisa Christian Church (becoming a deacon in 1956, trustee in 1961 and elder after 1964), Masons (attaining the 32nd degree and serving as master of lodge #58), Sigma Phi Epsilon, Theta Delta Phi, Scottish Rite Shrine, Ruritan, Veterans of Foreign Wars, American Legion and Louisa Historical Society.

Louisa County voters, together with those from nearby Goochland and Fluvanna Counties, first elected Purcell to the Virginia House of Delegates in 1947, shortly after his wartime service, and continued to re-elect him to that part-time position until Purcell resigned following the end of the turbulent 1958 session, to assume a seat in the Virginia Senate as discussed below. Thus Purcell served as delegate for a decade, from January 1948 until the end of March 1958. He took pride in sponsoring the Uninsured Motorist Act which became law in 1958 and remains today. Purcell was replaced as delegate by Matthew Garland Anderson of Oilville, a lumberman and president of the Bank of Goochland. For several years beginning in 1950, while this man served as delegate for Louisa and adjoining counties, fellow lawyer W. Griffith Purcell (1912-1983) served as one of Richmond's delegates, but they appear unrelated.

Harold Purcell was first elected to the state senate (another part-time position) in a special election following the resignation of veteran state senator and theater owner Benjamin T. Pitts of Fredericksburg, who had cited ill health. That 1958 session was particularly rancorous, because former Virginia Governor and by then veteran U.S. Senator Harry F. Byrd (for whom the Byrd Organization is named) and allies within the Commonwealth promoted Massive Resistance to the U.S. Supreme Court's 1954 and 1955 decisions in Brown v. Board of Education (which included a companion case from relatively nearby Prince Edward County). That senatorial district (numbered the 26th until the census and court-decision based reapportionment of 1964, when it became the 25th) in his last term dropped Fluvanna County to the south and added the more northern counties of Orange and Spotsylvania, as well as the city of Fredericksburg following reapportionment.

Purcell's personal friendships with Senator Byrd and Governor Miles Godwin (who led Virginia during the first years of Massive Resistance), as well as relationships with fellow legislators including businessman Charles W. Cleaton of Mecklenburg County led to Purcell's election as Circuit Judge for Louisa County in 1966. However, Senator Byrd died that year, and while his son succeeded him in the U.S. Senate, continuing federal enforcement actions of judicial decisions, as well as voter disenchantment, led to the Byrd Organization's collapse. Purcell effectively still continued to lead Democrats in Louisa County after becoming a Virginia judge, but in the November 1969 election, 49.4% of Louisa County voters (and a majority in the Commonwealth) elected Republican Linwood Holton as governor. Purcell would resign his judicial post in 1979, when he resumed his private legal practice with his son. While a judge (and for years afterward), Purcell (whose brother and related entities had purchased Louisa land which the Commonwealth had proposed to develop into a prison) was involved in legal disputes concerning what became the Green Springs National Historic Landmark District.

== Death and legacy ==
Purcell died in Louisa County on July 14, 2007 and was buried at Hillcrest cemetery, as were his parents and a brother. His widow would join him two years later; they were also survived by both sons and four grandchildren.

Virginia House of Delegates
Preceded by Henry S. Johnson	Virginia Delegate for Fluvanna, Goochland, and Louisa; 1948–1959	Succeeded by Matt G. Anderson
Senate of Virginia
Preceded by Benjamin T. Pitts	Virginia Senator for the 26th District; 1959–1964	Succeeded by John Alexander
Preceded by Edward O. McCue Jr.	Virginia Senator for the 25th District; 1964–1966	Succeeded by John Galleher
