= Martin Williams (politician) =

American politician (1858–1934)

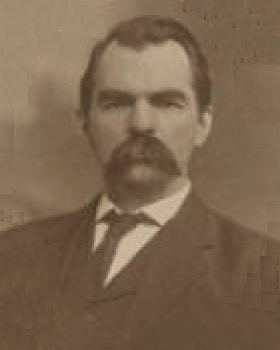

Member of the Virginia House of Delegates for Giles and Bland
- In office January 10, 1906 – January 12, 1916
- Preceded by: George T. Bird
- Succeeded by: Anderson E. Shumate

Personal details
- Born: September 25, 1858 Burnt Chimney, Virginia, US
- Died: August 27, 1934 (aged 75) Pearisburg, Virginia, U.S.
- Party: Democratic
- Spouse: Nancy Belle Mustard
- Relatives: Samuel W. Williams (brother)

Martin Williams (September 25, 1858 – August 27, 1934) was an American Democratic politician who served as a member of the Virginia House of Delegates. He was majority floor leader of the House from 1910 to 1916.

Virginia House of Delegates
Preceded by George T. Bird	Virginia Delegate for Giles and Bland; 1906–1916	Succeeded by Anderson E. Shumate
Preceded by James R. Caton	House Majority Leader; 1910–1916	Succeeded by R. Holman Willis
