= Gordon F. Marsh =

American politician

Member of the Virginia Senate from the 3rd district
- In office November 30, 1955 – January 12, 1966
- Preceded by: Major M. Hillard
- Succeeded by: William B. Spong Jr. William H. Hodges; William P. Kellam

Personal details
- Born: Gordon Franklin Marsh; October 11, 1908 Grays Creek, North Carolina, U.S.
- Died: January 4, 1982 (aged 73) Portsmouth, Virginia, U.S.
- Party: Democratic
- Spouse: Lettie Frances Sifford
- Education: University of North Carolina

Gordon Franklin Marsh (October 11, 1908 – January 4, 1982) was a Virginia State Senator from Tidewater Virginia in the 1950s and 1960s.

== Early life and career ==
Marsh was born in the unincorporated community of Grays Creek in Cumberland County, North Carolina on October 11, 1908, the son of F. A. Marsh. Marsh attended the University of North Carolina. After graduating from college, Marsh moved to Norfolk, Virginia and was employed by the H. L. Green Stores Company. He worked in Norfolk and New York City.

== Politics ==
Marsh was the Norfolk County Attorney until 1955, when he was elected as a Democrat to the Virginia Senate representing the 3rd District. The district had just been redistricted and the City of Portsmouth was removed, so the district included Norfolk County and the City of South Norfolk. These later became the City of Chesapeake.

Marsh served in the Virginia Senate until 1966. That year, the state was court-ordered to redraw the House and Senate districts in the General Assembly, and the City of Virginia Beach and Portsmouth were added. In the Democratic Primary for the 3rd Senate District, fellow incumbent Senator William B. Spong Jr. defeated Marsh.

== Death ==
Marsh died in January 1982 in Portsmouth, Virginia.

Senate of Virginia
Preceded by Major M. Hillard	Virginia Senator from the 3rd district 1955–1966	Succeeded by William B. Spong, Jr. William H. Hodges; William P. Kellam
