= Walter C. Caudill =

American politician

President pro tempore of the Virginia Senate
- In office 1954–1955
- Preceded by: Robert C. Vaden
- Succeeded by: Charles T. Moses

Member of the Virginia Senate from the 19th district
- In office January 10, 1940 – January 10, 1955
- Preceded by: Anderson E. Shumate
- Succeeded by: D. Woodrow Bird

Member of the Virginia House of Delegates from the Giles and Bland Counties district
- In office January 8, 1936 – January 9, 1940
- Preceded by: Jasper N. Walker
- Succeeded by: James J. Davidson

Personal details
- Born: June 9, 1888 Alleghany County, North Carolina, U.S.
- Died: January 18, 1963 (aged 74)
- Party: Democratic
- Spouse: Mary Ring Cornett
- Education: Medical College of Virginia
- Occupation: Physician; politician

Walter Cleveland Caudill (June 9, 1888 – January 18, 1963) was a Virginia physician and politician. As a member of the Virginia General Assembly, Caudill represented Pearisburg, Virginia and adjoining counties between 1936 and 1955, first as a delegate and then as a state Senator.

== Early and family life ==
Caudill was born in Alleghany County, North Carolina, then educated at the Elk Creek Training School in Elk Creek, Virginia. He attended Appalachian State Teacher's College in Boone, North Carolina. Upon graduation, he moved to Richmond, Virginia and studied at the Medical College of Virginia. During World War I, Caudill joined the U.S. Army and was part of the American Expeditionary Force.

Caudill practiced medicine in Pearisburg (the county seat of Giles County) as a physician and surgeon. He also served as the President of the Medical Society of Virginia and was active in his Baptist church.

== Political career ==
In 1935, Giles and Bland County voters elected Caudill to represent them, part-time, as their delegate to the Virginia General Assembly. He served one term, having replaced Dr. Jasper N. Walker (1866-1938), who was chairman of Bland County's Democratic committee as well as that county's health secretary for thirty years. Caudill was replaced by Dr. James J. Davidson, who served on the Bland County board of supervisors for 16 years but only one term as a delegate.

In 1939, Caudill won election to state senate district 19, representing Bland, Giles, Pulaski and Wythe Counties. His predecessor, Anderson E. Shumate had served since 1928. Caudill likewise won re-election several times. Before his retirement after the 1955 session, Caudill had risen to speaker pro tempore and floor leader of the Senate. He used his political clout to secure construction of a hospital for Giles County, situated in Pearisburg. During his last legislative term, Caudill was a member of the Gray Commission that ultimately led to the Stanley Plan which embodied the Massive Resistance to racial integration vowed by U.S. Senator Harry F. Byrd after the U.S. Supreme Court decisions in Brown v. Board of Education. However, because Dr. Caudill retired in 1955, he did not participate in the escalation. Fellow Democrat D. Woodrow Bird was elected to succeed Caudill representing those counties in the Senate, and fellow Democrat Charles T. Moses of Appomattox County succeeded him as the Senate President Pro Tem during Massive Resistance.

== Death and legacy ==
Caudill died on January 18, 1963.
