= Anderson E. Shumate =

American politician (1879–1947)

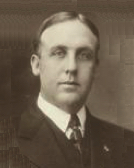

Member of the Virginia Senate from the 19th district
- In office January 11, 1928 – January 10, 1940
- Preceded by: Samuel T. Crockett
- Succeeded by: Walter C. Caudill

Member of the Virginia House of Delegates for Giles and Bland
- In office January 12, 1916 – January 14, 1920
- Preceded by: Martin Williams
- Succeeded by: William B. Snidow

Personal details
- Born: Anderson Everett Shumate; December 24, 1879 Giles, Virginia, U.S.
- Died: October 3, 1947 (aged 67) Albemarle, Virginia, U.S.
- Party: Democratic
- Spouse: Lillian May Hale
- Education: College of William & Mary

Anderson Everett Shumate (December 24, 1879 – October 3, 1947) was an American Democratic politician who served as a member of the Virginia House of Delegates and Virginia Senate.

Virginia House of Delegates
| Preceded by Martin Williams | Virginia Delegate for Giles and Bland; 1916–1920 | Succeeded by William B. Snidow |
Senate of Virginia
| Preceded by Samuel T. Crockett | Virginia Senator for the 19th District; 1928–1940 | Succeeded by Walter C. Caudill |
