= List of mayors of Staunton, Virginia =

Mayors of the city of Staunton, Virginia, USA

The following is a list of mayors of the city of Staunton, Virginia, USA.

== Mayors ==
- Jacob Swoope, ca.1801-1805
- Chapman Johnson, ca.1808
- William Kinney
- N.K. Trout, ca.1855
- Kenton Harper
- Armistead C. Gordon, 1884–1886
- Jacob Yost, 1886-1887
- Alexander H. Fultz, ca.1895
- William H. Landes, ca.1904
- Hampton Wayt, ca.1915
- J. Harry May, ca.1916
- Geo. A. Cottrell, ca.1934
- William A. Grubert, 1934–1936
- Curry Carter, 1936–1938
- William A. Grubert, 1940–1955
- Malcolm J. Reid, ca.1956
- Patricia H. Menk, ca.1964-1966
- Dolores Lescure, ca.1983-1984
- Nancy K. O'Hare, ca.1987-1990
- Lacy B. King Jr., ca.2009-2014
- Carolyn Dull, ca.2014-2020
- Stephen W. Claffey, ca.2024

== See also ==
- Staunton history
