= William H. Hodges =

American politician and judge

Judge of the Virginia Court of Appeals
- In office January 1985 – October 31, 1989
- Preceded by: None (position created)
- Succeeded by: Jere M. H. Willis, Jr.

Member of the Virginia Senate from the 3rd district
- In office January 12, 1966 – January 12, 1972
- Preceded by: Gordon F. Marsh
- Succeeded by: William E. Fears

Member of the Virginia House of Delegates from the 49th district
- In office January 10, 1962 – January 12, 1966
- Preceded by: Charles B. Cross, Jr.
- Succeeded by: Stanley G. Bryan

Personal details
- Born: William Howard Hodges; April 18, 1929 Hickory, Virginia, U.S.
- Died: September 14, 2017 (aged 88) Norfolk, Virginia, U.S.
- Party: Democratic
- Education: Randolph-Macon College; Washington & Lee University

Military service
- Allegiance: United States
- Branch/service: United States Coast Guard
- Years of service: 1951–1953

William Howard Hodges (April 18, 1929 – September 14, 2017) was a Virginia Court of Appeals judge and state legislator.

== Early life and education ==
Hodges is a native of Chesapeake, Virginia (then known as Norfolk County, Virginia). Hodges graduated from Randolph-Macon College in 1951, where he earned his B.A. in sociology. While at Randolph-Macon, he was a member of Phi Kappa Sigma. Hodges received his J.D. from the Washington & Lee University School of Law in 1956. He practiced law in the Tidewater region of Virginia. Hodges was a veteran of the United States Coast Guard, serving from 1951 to 1953.

== Political and judicial career ==
Hodges was elected in 1961 as Democrat to the Virginia House of Delegates representing the 49th District. He served two terms in the House and then was elected to the Virginia Senate when incumbent State Senator William B. Spong was elected the U.S. Senate in 1966. Hodges represented the 3rd District, which included all of the cities of Portsmouth, Chesapeake and Virginia Beach, from 1966 to 1972.

He was judge of the First Judicial Circuit of Virginia from 1972 to 1984. In 1977, Hodges was appointed by Governor Mills E. Godwin as Chairman of the Virginia Council on Criminal Justice. When the Virginia General Assembly created the Court of Appeals of Virginia in 1985, Judge Hodges was one of its first members. He served that court as an active member until 1989 and as a senior judge after that.

== Awards and recognition ==
In 1981, Hodges was named First Citizen of the City of Chesapeake and in 1983 he received the Commendation Award from the Chesapeake Chamber of Commerce in recognition of his community service. In 1993 he was further honored by the Chamber for his contributions to the city.

Hodges has served as a member of the Board of Directors of the Chesapeake People's Bank, on the Board of Trustees of his alma mater Randolph-Macon College and as vice chairman of the Virginia Crime Commission.

Virginia House of Delegates
Preceded by Charles B. Cross	Virginia House, District 49; 1962–1966	Succeeded by Bernard Levin
Senate of Virginia
Preceded by William B. Spong	Virginia Senate, District 3; 1966–1972	Succeeded by William E. Fears
Legal offices
Preceded by Newly Created Court	Judge, Virginia Court of Appeals; 1985–1989	Succeeded by J.M.H. Willis Jr.
