= Curry Carter =

American politician

Member of the Virginia Senate
- In office January 14, 1948 – January 12, 1966
- Preceded by: W. Stuart Moffett
- Succeeded by: George M. Cochran
- Constituency: 23rd district (1948‍–‍1956); 22nd district (1956‍–‍1964); 21st district (1964‍–‍1966)

Mayor of Staunton, Virginia
- In office 1936–1938
- Preceded by: William A. Grubert
- Succeeded by: George A. Cottrell

Personal details
- Born: Curry Clopton Carter; April 17, 1892 Washington, Virginia, U.S.
- Died: May 15, 1970 (aged 78) Staunton, Virginia, U.S.
- Party: Democratic
- Spouse: Constance Curry (m. 1923)
- Education: Hampden–Sydney College
- Occupation: Lawyer; politician

Military service
- Branch/service: United States Army
- Battles/wars: World War I; World War II

Curry Clopton Carter (April 17, 1892 – May 15, 1970) was a Virginia Democratic politician from Staunton, Virginia.

== Early life and education ==
Carter was born on April 17, 1892, in Washington, Virginia, in Rappahannock County to French Pendleton Carter and Judith M. Miller. He was educated at Augusta Military Academy and Hampden-Sydney College where he was a member of Kappa Alpha Order. He served as a lieutenant in the United States Army in World War I. On June 7, 1923, Carter married Constance Curry in Staunton and embarked on the practice of law.

== Politics and career ==
Carter practiced law in Staunton. In 1935 Staunton's voters elected him mayor. He served one term (1936–1938). In 1940, he was a Delegate to the Democratic National Convention. During World War II, Carter again donned his uniform to serve the country with the rank of lieutenant colonel, and continued in the National Guard after the war ended. In addition to his private legal practice, Carter served as president of the Board of Visitors of the Virginia School for the Deaf and the Blind in Staunton. As a legislator (discussed below), Carter was interested in vocational and technical education, as well as fostering the tourist trade in Virginia. His wife chaired the commission to study the Woodrow Wilson Rehabilitation center, which issued a report in 1963.

In 1947, Curry Carter was elected to the Virginia Senate (a part-time position) from the 23rd district. He represented the City of Staunton, Augusta County and Highland County in the Shenandoah Valley, succeeding W. Stuart Moffett. Senator Carter served until 1965, but the district changed numbers several times. The City of Waynesboro was added to the district before his re-election in 1951, and Bath County before his re-election in 1955 from what had become 22nd district.

Curry Carter was a member of the Byrd Organization, and became heavily involved in Massive Resistance, which with census changes and changes in federal law (especially the Voting Rights Act of 1965 which the Organization vehemently opposed), changed district boundaries significantly. Carter served on both the Gray Commission, which was designed to address the Brown v. Board of Education decisions of the United States Supreme Court, and which ultimately became radicalized and produced the Stanley Plan, which closed Virginia public schools that faced integration, and also funded segregation academies. Various courts declared major portions of the Stanley unconstitutional in 1958 and 1959, but some Virginia public schools remained closed for years. Governor J. Lindsay Almond then appointed Carter to the Perrow Commission, which took a more passive route toward racial desegregation.

When Carter sought re-election in 1961 from what had become the 22nd district, Republican Winston Wine almost defeated him. Curry Carter announced his retirement after the 1965 redistricting in which Augusta, Rockbridge, and Highland counties and the cities of Buena Vista, Staunton, Waynesboro and Lexington became the 19th senatorial District. Fellow Staunton lawyer and Democrat George M. Cochran won overwhelmingly, with over 94% of the vote against Republican Winston Wine, who won just 5%.

== Death and memorials ==
Carter died on May 15, 1970, four days after his wife Constance (1897–1970) died in Waynesboro. Carter Hall at the Virginia School for the Deaf and the Blind is named for him.

== See also ==
- List of mayors of Staunton, Virginia

Senate of Virginia
Preceded by W. Stuart Moffett	Virginia Senate, District 23; 1948–1956	Succeeded by George S. Aldhizer, II
Preceded by Charles R. Fenwick	Virginia Senate, District 22; 1956–1964	Succeeded by Edward O. McCue
Preceded by James Clinton Turk	Virginia Senate, District 21; 1964–1966	Succeeded by J. Kenneth Robinson
