= Lloyd C. Bird =

American politician

Member of the Virginia Senate
- In office January 12, 1944 – January 12, 1972
- Preceded by: Hundsdon Cary
- Succeeded by: Frederick T. Gray
- Constituency: 34th district (1944–1956); 33rd district (1956–1964); 32nd district (1964–1966); 29th district (1966–1972)

Personal details
- Born: Lloyd Campbell Bird; August 1, 1894 Highland, Virginia, U.S.
- Died: April 20, 1978 (aged 83) Chesterfield, Virginia, U.S.
- Party: Democratic
- Spouse: Lucille Crutchfield
- Children: 2
- Education: Medical College of Virginia

Lloyd Campbell Bird (August 1, 1894 – April 20, 1978) was a pharmacist, businessman and Democratic politician who served as a Virginia State Senator for 28 years and helped found Virginia Commonwealth University in Richmond.

== Early and family life ==
He was born in Highland County, Virginia to George Anson Bird and his wife Mary Susan Campbell. Bird graduated from the Medical College of Virginia in 1917. He married Mrs Lucille Crutchfield, and they had a son and daughter.

== Career ==
After graduation, Bird began teaching at what is now the Medical College of Virginia. In 1925, he partnered with Morris Phipps to start Phipps & Bird, a business that provided laboratory apparatus, chemicals and other products for scientific education.

From 1952 to 1953, he was the president of the Virginia Academy of Science, which in 1972 elected him as a "Fellow".

A Democrat, Bird began his public career as a member of the Byrd Organization. Voters first elected him to the Virginia Senate in 1944, and he represented Charles City, Chesterfield, Henrico, James City, and New Kent counties as well as the city of Williamsburg. Bird replaced fellow Democrat Hunsdon Cary, who resigned during the 1942 General Assembly, but the vacancy was not filled for the special session that fall. Despite multiple reorganizations of his senatorial district, Bird was continually re-elected (generally for four year terms) more than seven times. During his long tenure, redistricting occurred several times, both due to federal census results and court orders pursuant to the instructions of the United States Supreme Court concerning one-man, one-vote.

In 1955, a major reorganization of the Senate renumbered his district the 33rd, and limited it geographically to Charles City and Chesterfield counties, part of Henrico county and the city of Colonial Heights; the 34th district at that time was redrawn to include only the city of Richmond, and was represented by three state senators. Another reorganization in 1963 renumbered Bird's district the 32nd and it included Charles City, Chesterfield, James City and New Kent counties, as well as the cities of Colonial Heights and Williamsburg; the 33rd district was redrawn at that time to encompass Richmond City and the 34th district to include Henrico County. A further reorganization in 1965 renumbered Bird's district the 29th, and it included Charles City, Chesterfield, Amelia, New Kent Counties and the city of Colonial Heights. Bird retired after the massive Republican victories in the 1970 elections, and subsequent redistricting after the 1970 census split his district into three districts, each with a veteran Democratic senator whom he would thus have to defeat in the party's primary. Charles City and New Kent counties were added to the 4th senatorial district (which also included Gloucester, Goochland, Hanover, King and Queen, King William. Louisa, Mathews and Middlesex counties) which was represented by Leslie D. Campbell Jr.; Chesterfield County was combined with Henrico County and Richmond City as the 11th senatorial district, which continued to be represented by Byrd Organization stalwart Frederick T. Gray and Colonial Heights was added to the 16th senatorial district (which included Prince George, Surry, Sussex counties and the cities of Hopewell and Petersburg) and represented by Elmon T. Gray.

While many now regret Bird's involvement in Massive Resistance, as it ended pursuant to adverse court decisions and voter antipathy, Bird headed a legislative commission worked with fellow Byrd stalwart and Virginia Governor Mills E. Godwin as well as former Richmond mayor (turned member of the Virginia House of Delegates) Eleanor P. Sheppard to form Virginia Commonwealth University by merging his alma mater, the Medical College of Virginia and Richmond Professional Institute.

== Death and legacy ==
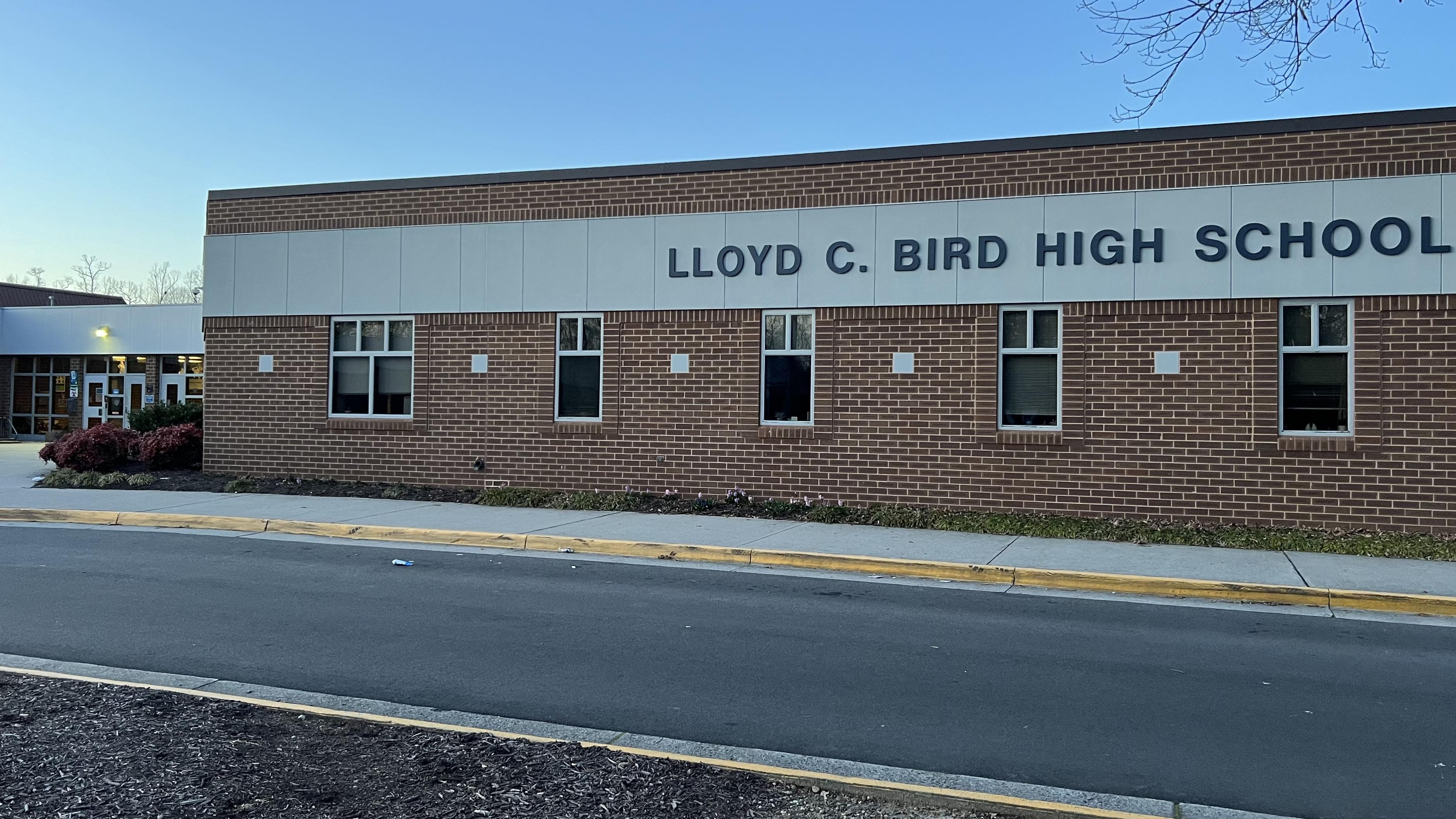
L. C. Bird High School

Bird retired from the Senate shortly after his wife's death, but lived an additional eight years.

Lloyd C. Bird High School in Chesterfield County, Virginia is named after him.

Virginia House of Delegates
Preceded by Hunsdon Cary	Representing Virginia Senate, District 34; 1944-1956	Succeeded by Edward E. Haddock
Preceded by Victor P. Wilson	Representing Virginia Senate, District 33; 1956-1964	Succeeded by Edward E. Willey
Preceded by Victor P. Wilson	Representing Virginia Senate, District 32; 1964-1966	Succeeded by William B. Hopkins
Preceded by Leslie D. Campbell Jr.	Representing Virginia Senate, District 29; 1966-1972	Succeeded by H. Selwyn Smith
