= Charles T. Moses =

American politician

President pro tempore of the Virginia Senate
- In office January 11, 1956 – November 17, 1964
- Preceded by: Walter C. Caudill
- Succeeded by: James D. Hagood

Member of the Virginia Senate from the 11th district
- In office January 8, 1936 – November 17, 1964
- Preceded by: S. L. Ferguson
- Succeeded by: Robert S. Burruss Jr.

Personal details
- Born: June 27, 1897 Appomattox County, Virginia, United States
- Died: November 17, 1964 (aged 67) Lynchburg, Virginia, United States
- Party: Democratic
- Spouse: Mary Virginia Godwin

Charles Thomas Moses Sr. (June 27, 1897 – November 17, 1964) was a Virginia business owner and Democratic member of the Senate of Virginia. Allied with the Byrd Organization, Moses represented a district centered around Appomattox County part time for 28 years. For the last nearly nine years (until his death in office) and in the absence of Virginia's Lieutenant Governors, Moses led the Virginia senate as its President pro tempore during Massive Resistance until his death in office.

== Early and family life ==
Born in Appomattox County, Virginia to the former Clara Matilda Mann and her tobacco merchant husband Thomas Walker Moses, whose ancestors had emigrated from Germany to Chester County, Pennsylvania in 1743 and to Buckingham County, Virginia in 1783. After the Civil War, Charles Moses (the grandfather for whom this boy was named) had married Molly Woodson, daughter of the local Baptist minister and nicknamed the "Doughgirl" for feeding many Confederate and Union soldiers the day CSA General Lee surrendered at Appomattox Court House on April 9, 1865. His uncle (also Charles Moses) was a county supervisor and responsible for constructing a New Appomattox Court House in 1892 after the old courthouse (now in Appomattox National Historical Park) burned down. The Moses family also included a daughter, Nettie, who married a Canadian (Frank Dresser), and whose children moved to Maryland and North Carolina. Charles Moses graduated from (the segregated) Appomattox High School (although the current Appomattox County High School was built a decade after his death). He registered for the draft but did not serve in World War I. He married Mary Virginia Godwin, and raised three daughters as well as one son and was active in his Methodist church.

== Career ==
Moses began working with his father at Moses Motor Company in Appomattox, Virginia. He sold Oldsmobiles and Samson tractors (a General Motors brand after World War I) as well as serviced other motor vehicles. By 1940 his son-in-law Webster Babcock had also joined the family business which was ultimately sold and became Cardinal Chevrolet.

Moses also became active in the local Democratic Party. In 1935 he won an election to succeed veteran state senator Samuel Lewis Ferguson, who had died in office. Moses considered himself a champion of the rural citizen, and served on the Virginia Civil War Centennial Committee, as chair of the Darkfired Tobacco Growers Association and for 32 years also sat on the board of the Farmers National Bank. Despite several censuses and many redistrictings of senatorial districts during his decades as legislator, Moses only represented the 11th senatorial district, which comprised Appomattox and neighboring Buckingham, Cumberland and Charlotte counties when he first took the oath of office on January 8, 1936. In 1955 Powhatan, Amherst, Nelson and Amelia counties were added, and continued as part of the expanded district (to offset population growth in northern Virginia) until his final re-election in 1963. Following his death, the seat was vacant during the special session, then the district was reorganized. The new senate District 11 included the city of Lynchburg and adjoining Bedford County rather than the geographic area Moses had represented. Following the 1965 redistricting, Appomattox, Buckingham, Amherst, Nelson and Campbell counties were added to District 10 (to which James W. Davis was elected), and Cumberland and Powhatan counties were added to senate district 22 (centered around Charlottesville and represented by Edward O. McCue Jr.).

== Death and legacy ==
Moses died of leukemia on November 17, 1964, at the Virginia Baptist Hospital in Lynchburg, and was buried at Liberty Baptist Church cemetery in Appomattox. The Charles T. Moses Memorial Highway was named by the Virginia General Assembly in his honor in February 1966. His portrait also hangs in the New Appomattox Court House.
