= Robert C. Vaden =

American politician

President pro tempore of the Virginia Senate
- In office January 9, 1952 – January 12, 1954
- Preceded by: Morton G. Goode
- Succeeded by: Walter C. Caudill

Member of the Virginia Senate from the 13th district
- In office August 17, 1933 – January 12, 1954
- Preceded by: E. J. Harvey
- Succeeded by: Landon Wyatt

Personal details
- Born: Robert Carrington Vaden; October 5, 1882 Chatham, Virginia, U.S.
- Died: February 20, 1954 (aged 71) Danville, Virginia, U.S.
- Party: Democratic
- Spouse: Kate Smith Paris
- Education: University of Richmond

Robert Carrington Vaden (October 5, 1882 – February 20, 1954) was a Virginia businessman and Democratic member of the Senate of Virginia. Allied with the Byrd Organization, Vaden represented a district centered around Danville part time for three decades. During his last term and in the absence of Virginia's Lieutenant Governors, Vaden led the Virginia senate as its President pro tempore.

== Early and family life ==
Born in Pittsylvania County near Chatham, Virginia to the former Eliza Tate and her farmer husband Giles Vaden, Vaden had at least five brothers and two sisters, and in 1910 still lived at home and worked in a sawmill. He had been educated in the local public schools, and then at the University of Richmond. On Christmas Day 1912, he married Kate Smith Paris, daughter of Charles Craddock and Lilly Middleton Paris. By 1920, the couple had a son and three daughters and owned a general store in Chatham. He was active in the Sons of the American Revolution based on the patriotic service of his ancestor Burwell Vaden. He was also active in his Baptist church, Phi Kappa Epsilon and the Masons.

== Career ==
Initially a merchant, Vaden became a leading industrialist in the area, as well as a banker. Active in the local Democratic Party, he became mayor of Gretna (serving 15 years--1918-1933--before his first legislative run below) and aligned with the Byrd Organization.

Vaden began his part-time legislative career in 1933, as he succeeded lawyer and former judge E. J. Harvey of Chatham, who had long served as one of two senators representing the 13th Virginia senatorial district, but died in office. The district then consisted of Pittsylvania, Henry and Patrick counties and the cities of Danville and Martinsville. Vaden defeated E.J. Wyatt of Danville, and served alongside businessman William Allen Garrett for several years. In 1936, he worked with Byrd lieutenant and future governor and congressman William M. Tuck concerning tobacco subsidies. John W. Carter Jr. succeeded Garrett in the 1940 session, but was replaced by Danville lawyer Maitland H. Bustard in the assemblies of 1940, 1942, 1944–45 and 1946–47. Frank B. Burton won the special election held February 3, 1948 for what had been Bustard's seat, and remained Vaden's co-senator for his final terms. For the Assembly that began 1954, Landon R. Wyatt succeeded Vaden briefly alongside Burton, who would die in office in 1956.

== Death and legacy ==
Vaden died at Danville's Memorial Hospital on January 12, 1954, of complications of diabetes and a heart condition, and was buried at Danville's Highland Burial Park. Although Danville and Martinsville had major racial segregation issues during his lifetime, as Virginia lawyers Martin A. Martin, Oliver Hill and future federal judge Spottswood Robinson had begun addressing, both in those cities and in Davis v. County School Board of Prince Edward County, which became a companion case to Brown v. Board of Education, the U.S. Supreme Court decisions in which sparked Massive Resistance by the Byrd Organization shortly after Vaden's death.
