= Macon M. Long =

American politician (1885–1988)

Member of the Virginia Senate
- In office January 12, 1944 – January 12, 1972
- Preceded by: R. R. Parker
- Succeeded by: John C. Buchanan
- Constituency: 17th district (1944–1964); 16th district (1964–1966); 15th district (1966–1972)

Member of the Virginia House of Delegates from Wise County
- In office January 10, 1940 – January 12, 1944
- Preceded by: Henry M. Bandy
- Succeeded by: Vernoy B. Tate

Personal details
- Born: Macon Melville Long; April 2, 1885 Rappahannock County, Virginia, U.S.
- Died: April 24, 1988 (aged 103) Abingdon, Virginia, U.S.
- Party: Democratic
- Children: 4
- Education: University of Richmond (LLB)
- Occupation: Lawyer; politician

Macon Melville Long (April 2, 1885 – April 24, 1988) was an American farmer, banker, lawyer and politician who served in both houses of the Virginia General Assembly representing Wise County and nearby areas of southwest Virginia. He served as a member of the Virginia House of Delegates from 1940 to 1943, then as a member of the Virginia Senate from 1944 to 1971.

== Early life ==
Macon Melville Long was born on April 2, 1885, near Woodville in Rappahannock County, Virginia, to the former Alice Varner and her husband, J. Macon Long, both Primitive Baptists and farmers. He had three sisters and a younger brother, Edwin, who became a physician and moved to Utah. Long graduated from the University of Richmond School of Law with a Bachelor of Laws in 1910.

== Career ==
Long moved to the Clinch River Valley and practiced law for 62 years in St. Paul. He was president of Wise County Bar Association, president of the Virginia State Bar, and vice president of the Virginia State Bar Association. He was on the board of trustees of the University of Richmond and chairman of the Virginia Advisory Legislative Council. He was president of St. Paul National Bank. He also worked as a farmer.

A member of the Democratic Party, Long won his first election, to the Virginia House of Delegates in 1939, and served from 1940 to 1943 when he won election to the state senate (also a part-time position) representing Wise and nearby Dickenson County. Two years later he won election to the Virginia Senate, and won re-election repeatedly, from 1944 to 1971, However, his district changed as various one-man/one-vote decisions of the U.S. Supreme Court forced the Byrd Organization to increase representation of the populations centers in northern and southeastern Virginia, with Norton County added for the 1959 election and Russell County for the 1965 election. Long's only serious challenge came as the Byrd Organization disintegrated at the end of the Massive Resistance crisis in 1967, when he defeated a Republican challenger by approximately 500 votes of 30,000 cast. He was chairman of the courts of justice committee and the steering committee. He was a member of the rules, privileges and elections, finance, confirmations, and roads and navigation committees.

== Personal life ==
Long married Charlotte Tompkins of Bristol, Virginia in Lee County in 1915. The couple had one son and four daughters (of whom three reached adulthood, Virginia, Charlotte and Helen). His son Macon M. Long Jr. like his father became a lawyer, and the legislature elected him as a circuit court judge. Long was a deacon and Sunday School teacher at First Baptist Church in St. Paul.

== Death and legacy ==
Long died on April 24, 1988, in Abingdon.

Long received an honorary degree from the University of Richmond in 1974.
