= James D. Hagood =

American politician

President pro tempore of the Virginia Senate
- In office January 12, 1966 – January 11, 1972
- Preceded by: Charles T. Moses
- Succeeded by: Edward E. Willey Sr.

Member of the Virginia Senate from the 4th district
- In office January 14, 1942 – January 11, 1972
- Preceded by: William M. Tuck
- Succeeded by: Leslie D. Campbell Jr.

Personal details
- Born: November 4, 1889 La Crosse, Mecklenburg County, Virginia, U.S.
- Died: December 30, 1972 (aged 83) South Boston, Halifax County, Virginia, U.S.
- Resting place: Clover Cemetery
- Party: Democratic
- Spouse(s): Eleanor Bustard, Wirt Carrington Jordan
- Education: Medical College of Virginia

James Davis Hagood (November 4, 1889 – December 30, 1972) was a Virginia physician and Democratic member of the Senate of Virginia. Allied with the Byrd Organization, Hagood represented a district centered around Halifax County part-time for three decades. For the last six years and in the absence of Virginia's Lieutenant Governors, Hagood led the Virginia senate as its President pro tempore.

== Early and family life ==
Born on November 4, 1889, in the small crossroads town of La Crosse, Virginia in rural Mecklenburg County to the former Florence Cleaton and her husband James Gholson Hagood. He attended a private academy in Warrenton, North Carolina, then went to Richmond, Virginia to study medicine at the Medical College of Virginia, from which he graduated in 1913.

In 1917, the 29 year old doctor married his first wife, 33 year old, Irish-born Eleanor Bustard (1884-1934), who had emigrated with her family to Virginia. They adopted a son, Talbott. After her death, in 1936 he married Wirt Carrington Jordan (whose ancestors on both sides had long governed Halifax County), who survived him. Dr. Hagood was active in his Methodist Church, the Masons and Shriners.

== Career ==
When a yellow fever epidemic hit Halifax County in 1920, Dr. Hagood was appointed (without pay) as a part-time health officer, as had been the county's custom. However, in 1922, with help from the Commonwealth and Red Cross, Halifax County employed its first health officer, as well as nurses, who would continue to address sanitation and other concerns. Initially, Dr. Hagood lived in Scottsburg, Virginia, but in 1927 bought the clinic of Dr. R.H. Fuller and moved to Clover, Virginia (still in Halifax County), and owned various pieces of property throughout the county.

One of his main accomplishments as a legislator after World War II was creating the Halifax Community Hospital in South Boston, as advocated by Rev. Ralph Bellwood and James Easley, who also advocated for the Patrick Henry Home for Boys and the Patrick Henry Memorial Foundation (on whose boards Dr. Hagood sat for decades). Previously, each of the town's three doctors operated their own very small hospitals (caring for perhaps six patients), and residents needing more extensive care went to far-away hospitals in Lynchburg, Danville, Richmond or Charlottesville, Virginia, or even Duke University Hospital in North Carolina or Johns Hopkins Hospital in Maryland. Dr. Hagood became medical director of the Halifax Community Hospital (1948-1953) before its formal opening. In 1946, his nephews William Hagood Jr. and Warren Hagood had also joined the Hagood general practice. William Hagood in 1969 testified concerning drug prices before the United States Senate at the invitation of Virginia Senator Byrd. Dr. Hagood was active in the Commonwealth Club, Medical Society of Virginia (President in 1957), Virginia Academy of General Practice (past president), South Piedmont Medical Society, Virginia State Medical Society, American Medical Association.

Involved in the local Democratic Party, Hagood initially served on the local school board (1920-1932), then as the supervisor for the county's Roanoke district (1932-1942). When Halifax county's state senator, lawyer William N. Tuck (influential in the Byrd Organization and a key figure in Massive resistance after 1954) successfully ran for Lieutenant Governor of Virginia, Hagood was slated for his former senate seat. He won election and re-election easily, and became chairman of the powerful Finance Committee in 1950 (Tuck having won election as Virginia's governor in 1945 and treating the doctor as an elder brother). However, because Halifax county had relatively few inhabitants, especially as northern Virginia counties grew and became suburbs of Washington, DC. after World War II, in 1955 the 10th senate district became the 4th senate district and expanded to include Charlotte and Prince Edward counties. South Boston, the largest Halifax county town and government seat, became an independent city in 1960 (although it would rescind that status in 1995) and so was added to the 4th district in the 1963 election. Following the U.S. Supreme Court's Davis v. Mann decision in 1964, Lunenberg and Nottaway counties were added to the 4th senatorial district in 1965. The 1970 census required further reorganization, and the new 4th district included only counties far to the east of the 4th district Dr. Hagood had represented. Halifax; Charlotte and Prince Edward counties and the city of South Boston moved to the 18th senatorial district with Appomattox, Buckingham and Campbell counties and together elected Howard P. Anderson to succeed Dr. Hagood. Lunenberg and Nottaway counties were split off and moved to district 17, with Amelia, Brunswick, Cumberland, Mecklenburg, Powhatan and Chesterfield counties.

== Death and legacy ==
Hagood died following a stroke on December 30, 1972, at a hospital in South Boston. He was buried in Clover Cemetery. His papers are held among the special collections of the University of Virginia library. A section of U.S. Route 360 in Halifax county (between Clover and South Boston) is named in his honor.
