= Benjamin T. Pitts =

American politician and businessman (died 1964)

Member of the Virginia Senate from the 26th district
- In office 1944 – May 1958
- Succeeded by: Harold H. Purcell

Personal details
- Born: Benjamin Thomas Pitts Fredericksburg, Virginia, U.S.
- Died: July 21, 1964 (aged 75) Fredericksburg, Virginia, U.S.
- Resting place: Oak Hill Cemetery; Culpeper, Virginia, U.S.
- Party: Democratic
- Spouse: Eleanor Hughlett (m. 1910; died 1955)
- Children: 1
- Occupation: Politician; theater owner

Benjamin Thomas Pitts (died July 21, 1964) was an American politician and movie theater owner from Virginia. He served in the Virginia Senate and ran a chain of movie theaters in Virginia and West Virginia, including theaters in Fredericksburg, Culpeper and Richmond.

== Early life ==
Benjamin Thomas Pitts was born in Fredericksburg, Virginia. His mother's name was Victoria. His parents moved to the country for a time and then his family returned to Fredericksburg when he was eight. He attended public schools in Fredericksburg. His first job was working for plumber George W. Heflin. He also sold newspapers and worked at the grocery store.

== Career ==
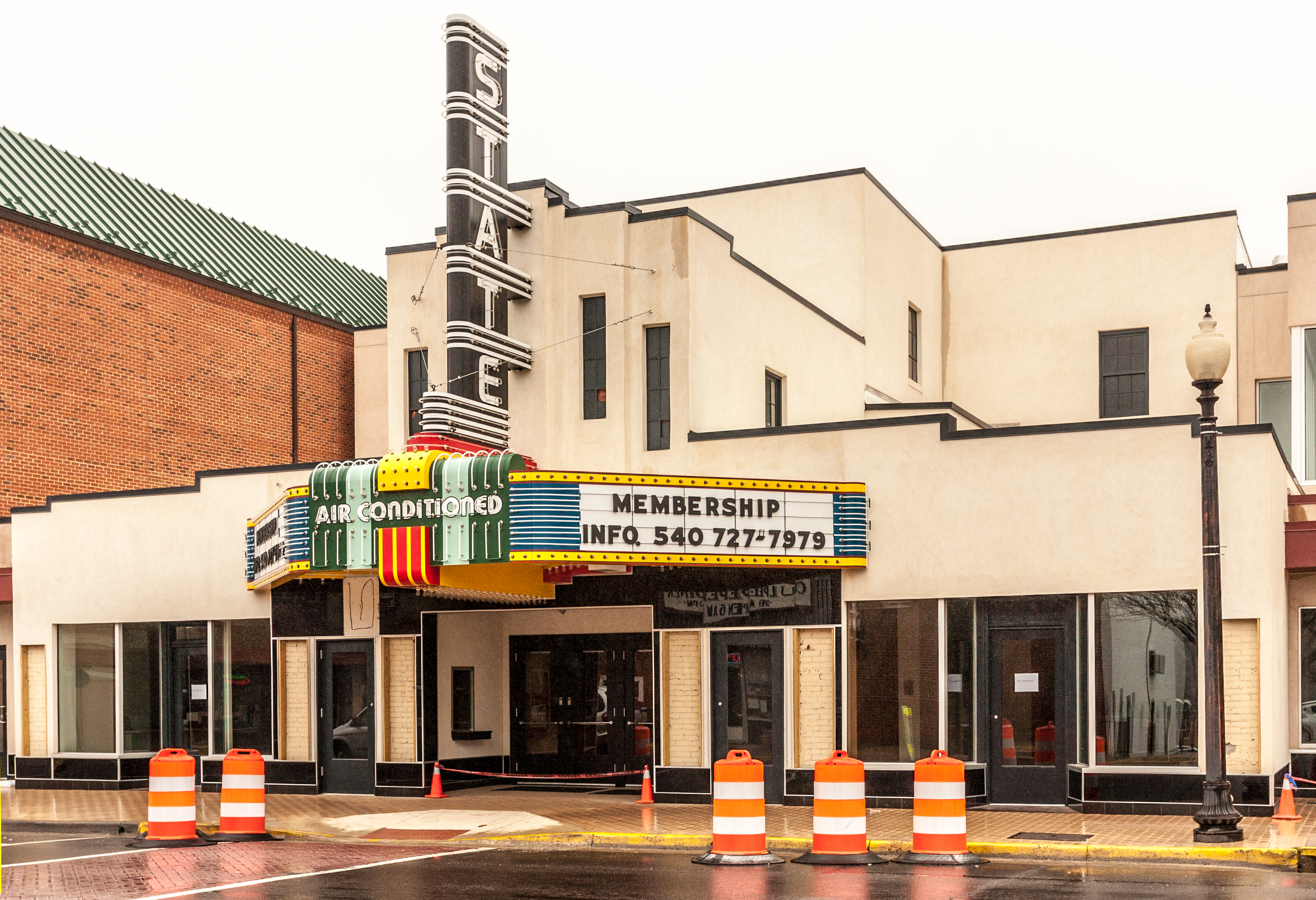
Pitts Theatre in Culpeper

Pitts started in the movie theater business by running shows at the Opera House in Fredericksburg by renting the building for US$1 a night. In 1914, Pitts opened a movie theater on Main Street in downtown Fredericksburg called The Leader with a capacity of 600 seats. The theater included a mechanical organ, which was considered a luxury for a theater in those times. In 1920, he also operated theaters in Kilmarnock, White Stone and Bowling Green for about three years before abandoning them. In 1929, he opened the Colonial Theater in Fredericksburg with a capacity of 1,100 seats. In November 1937, he opened a third theater in Fredericksburg called the Victoria, named after his mother. By 1939, he had expanded from Fredericksburg to a number of Virginia cities, including Richmond, Suffolk, Emporia, West Point, Orange, Culpeper, Warrenton, Leesburg, Manassas, Front Royal, Berryville. In November 1938, he opened a second theater in Richmond with plans to add another theater in Front Royal. He had also expanded to Charlestown, West Virginia. At its peak, he operated a statewide chain of 37 theaters. He was vice president of the Theater Owners of Virginia and a director of the Motion Picture Theater Owners of America. At the time of his death, his chain had reduced to 19 theaters, including the Pitts Theatre in Culpeper.

In 1933, Pitts was appointed to the city council of Fredericksburg to fill a vacancy. He was elected in 1936. He then served as president of the chamber of commerce for five terms. In 1933, he was named to the State Ports Authority. He served as treasurer there for five years.

Pitts was elected to the Virginia Senate, defeating H. H. Walton in the primary in 1943. He represented the 26th district starting in 1944. He was hospitalized on October 3, 1957, and resigned due to health issues in May 1958. He was chairman and member of the state's Democratic campaign finance committee.

Pitts was a director of the Virginia Chamber of Commerce. He was a member of the board of visitors of the Virginia School for the Deaf and Blind. He was a director of the Farmers and Merchants Bank of Fredericksburg.

== Philanthropy ==
By 1938, Pitts was giving scholarships to graduates of Fredericksburg High School. He started the Ben T. Pitts Foundation, which distributed college scholarships to high school seniors in the region. His will donated US$300,000 to the foundation.

== Personal life ==
Pitts married Eleanor Hughlett, daughter of Robert H. Hughlett, on April 24, 1910, in Rockville, Maryland. They had a daughter, Mrs. Walter Lowry Jr. His wife died in 1955. He was a member of the Elks in Eastern Virginia, at one point serving as an exalted ruler and district deputy. He was also a member of Kiwanis. He played first base and shortstop for local baseball teams. In the early 1920s, he managed a baseball team. His hobbies included dancing, golf and bowling.

In March 1931, Pitts was in an automobile accident and injured his hip. He died on July 21, 1964, aged 75, at the Medical College of Virginia Hospital in Richmond. He was buried at Oak Hill Cemetery in Fredericksburg. At the time of his death, his estate was valued at US$2,125,000 (equivalent to $22,059,415 in 2025).
