= Ted Dalton =

English footballer

Personal information
- Full name: Edward Dalton
- Date of birth: April 1882
- Place of birth: Chorlton-cum-Hardy, Manchester, England
- Date of death: 1969

Senior career*
Years	Team	Apps	(Gls)
?–1905	Pendlebury		
1905–1908	Manchester United	1	(0)
1908–1909	Pendlebury		
1909–?	St Helens Recreation		
- * Club domestic league appearances and goals

Edward Dalton (April 1882 – unknown) was an English footballer who played as a full-back. Born in Chorlton-cum-Hardy, Manchester, he began his career with Pendlebury, before joining Manchester United as an amateur in September 1905. He turned professional in January 1906, but it was not until 25 March 1908 that he made his Manchester United debut, starting at left-back in a 7–4 defeat away to Liverpool. In August that year, he returned to Pendlebury for their second season in the second division of the Lancashire Combination, but left for St Helens Recreation a year later after Pendlebury resigned from the league.
