= Major M. Hillard =

American politician (1896–1977)

Member of the Virginia Senate from the 3rd district
- In office January 13, 1932 – April 21, 1954
- Preceded by: Lloyd E. Warren
- Succeeded by: Gordon F. Marsh

Member of the Virginia House of Delegates for Norfolk and South Norfolk
- In office January 11, 1928 – January 13, 1932
- Preceded by: Quinton C. Davis, Jr.
- Succeeded by: Edward T. Humphries

Personal details
- Born: Major McKinley Hillard; October 23, 1896 Morgan, Tennessee, U.S.]
- Died: June 24, 1977 (aged 80) Chesapeake, Virginia, U.S.
- Party: Democratic
- Spouse: Mary Frances Cherry
- Education: College of William & Mary; University of Richmond

Military service
- Allegiance: United States
- Branch/service: United States Army
- Battles/wars: World War I

Major McKinley Hillard (October 23, 1896 – June 24, 1977) was a Virginia politician and judge from Chesapeake, Virginia.

== Early life and career ==
Hillard was born in Morgan County, Tennessee on October 23, 1896. His family moved to the Deep Creek borough of Norfolk County, Virginia (now the city of Chesapeake) in 1907.

Hillard served in the U.S. Army in World War I, after which he attended the College of William and Mary and the T.C. Williams Law School at the University of Richmond. He practiced law in Portsmouth, Virginia beginning in 1926. He married Mary Frances "Merle" Cherry (1895-1989) in about 1921. They had a son and a daughter.

== Political career ==
Hillard and was elected to the Virginia House of Delegates as a Democrat in 1927, representing Norfolk County and the City of South Norfolk and he was reelected in 1929. In 1931, he was elected to the Virginia Senate representing the 3rd District which he held until he resigned in 1954 upon being appointed Circuit Court Clerk for Norfolk County.

== Career on the bench ==
Hillard was appointed a Circuit Court judge in 1961. He used his political savvy and was instrumental in the merger of Norfolk County with South Norfolk to form the city of Chesapeake in 1963.

He retired from the bench in 1971, but continued serving the community in a variety of ways, such as at Deep Creek Baptist Church and the Deep Creek Ruritan Club.

== Death and memorials ==
The Major Hillard library is a public library in the City of Chesapeake that was named in Hillard's honor. Hillard died in June 1977 in Chesapeake, Virginia.

Virginia House of Delegates
Preceded by Quinton C. Davis, Jr.	Virginia Delegate for Norfolk and South Norfolk; 1928–1932	Succeeded by Edward T. Humphries
Senate of Virginia
Preceded by Lloyd E. Warren	Virginia Senator for the 3rd District; 1932–1954	Succeeded by Gordon F. Marsh
Legal offices
Preceded by Various	Judge, Circuit Court of Chesapeake; 1961–1971	Succeeded by Various
