= Edward E. Willey =

American politician

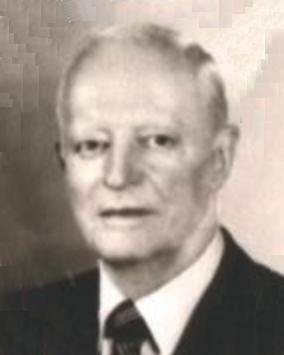

President pro tempore of the Virginia Senate
- In office January 12, 1972 – July 17, 1986
- Preceded by: James D. Hagood
- Succeeded by: Bill Parkerson

Member of the Virginia Senate
- In office January 9, 1952 – July 17, 1986
- Preceded by: Charles W. Crowder
- Succeeded by: Joseph B. Benedetti
- Constituency: 35th district (1952‍–‍1956); 34th district (1956‍–‍1964); 33rd district (1964‍–‍1966); 30th district (1966‍–‍1972); 10th district (1972‍–‍1986)

Personal details
- Born: Edward Eugene Willey; April 17, 1910 Middletown, Virginia, U.S.
- Died: July 17, 1986 (aged 76) Richmond, Virginia, U.S.
- Party: Democratic
- Spouse: Twyla Sutton Layton (m. 1932)
- Children: 2
- Education: Medical College of Virginia

Edward Eugene Willey Sr. (April 17, 1910 – July 17, 1986) was a pharmacist and politician from Virginia. He served as Senate Majority Leader in the Virginia General Assembly. He was also the father-in-law of Kathleen Willey, who was a figure in the Lewinsky scandal in 1998.

== Early life, family and education ==
Born in Middletown, Virginia, on April 17, 1910, he was one of four children born to Lloyd Clark and Lillah Wright Yates Willey. He grew up in Front Royal, Warren County, where he attended local public schools. Following graduation from Warren County High School, he enrolled in the School of Pharmacy at the Medical College of Virginia, graduating in 1930. Shortly thereafter, he met his future wife, Twyla Sutton Layton, of Newport News. The couple were married at Virginia Beach on August 20, 1932, and they had a son, Edward Eugene Willey, Jr. and a daughter, Twyla.

== Career ==
After graduating as a pharmacist, Willey began working for Springer Drug Company in Richmond. He continued with the firm until 1940, when he became a partner in Willey Drug Company. He became the pharmacy's sole owner in the early 1950s.

== Politics ==
Ed Willey first entered public life in 1947, when he accepted appointment to fill a vacancy on what was then the Richmond Board of Aldermen. In 1949, he was unanimously elected by other members of City Council to fill an unexpired term. Councilman Willey would serve from 1949 to 1951, when he declared for one of Richmond's three Senate seats in the state legislature. On January 19, 1952, Senator Edward E. Willey took the oath and began his career that would span thirty-four years until his death in 1986. In 1971, he became chair of Committee on Finance. He became President pro tempore of the Senate in the 1972 session, and in that role, assumed chairmanship of the Rules Committee. In 1975, Willey stepped down as Rules Chair in order to remain the chairman of Finance, believing that "the man who controls the money down here controls the power."

== Death ==
Following complications from a stroke suffered on June 16, 1986, Senator Willey died one month later on July 17. At the time of his death, he was considered the General Assembly's most powerful legislator. Following services at Centenary United Methodist Church, he was buried in Forest Lawn Cemetery in Richmond.

== Legacy ==
The Edward E. Willey Bridge on State Route 150 which carries Chippenham Parkway across the James River and links the City of Richmond with western Henrico County was named in his honor.
