= Edward L. Breeden Jr. =

American lawyer and politician

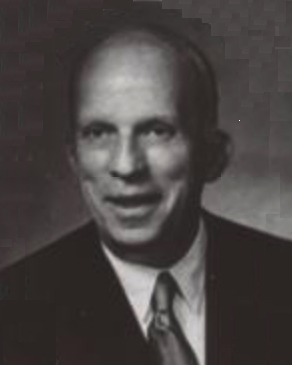

Member of the Virginia Senate from the 2nd district
- In office January 12, 1944 – January 12, 1972
- Preceded by: Vivian L. Page
- Succeeded by: Herbert H. Bateman

Member of the Virginia House of Delegates from Norfolk City
- In office January 8, 1936 – January 12, 1944
- Preceded by: Vivian L. Page
- Succeeded by: Delamater Davis

Personal details
- Born: Edward Lebbaeus Breeden Jr. January 28, 1905 Norfolk, Virginia, U.S.
- Died: June 1, 1990 (aged 85) Norfolk, Virginia, U.S.
- Party: Democratic
- Spouse(s): Willie Holland; Virginia Hurt
- Education: Hampden–Sydney College; George Washington University Law School

Edward Lebbaeus Breeden Jr. (January 28, 1905 – June 1, 1990) was an American lawyer and politician who served for many decades as a member of the Virginia General Assembly, first in the House of Delegates and later in the Senate. In 1970, he became the first formal majority floor leader of the Senate, after a move to reduce the power of the President pro tempore.

Senate of Virginia
| Preceded by James D. Hagood (as President pro tempore) | Senate Majority Leader; 1970–1972 | Succeeded by William B. Hopkins |
