= Byrd machine =

Political machine headed by Harry F. Byrd (1887–1966)

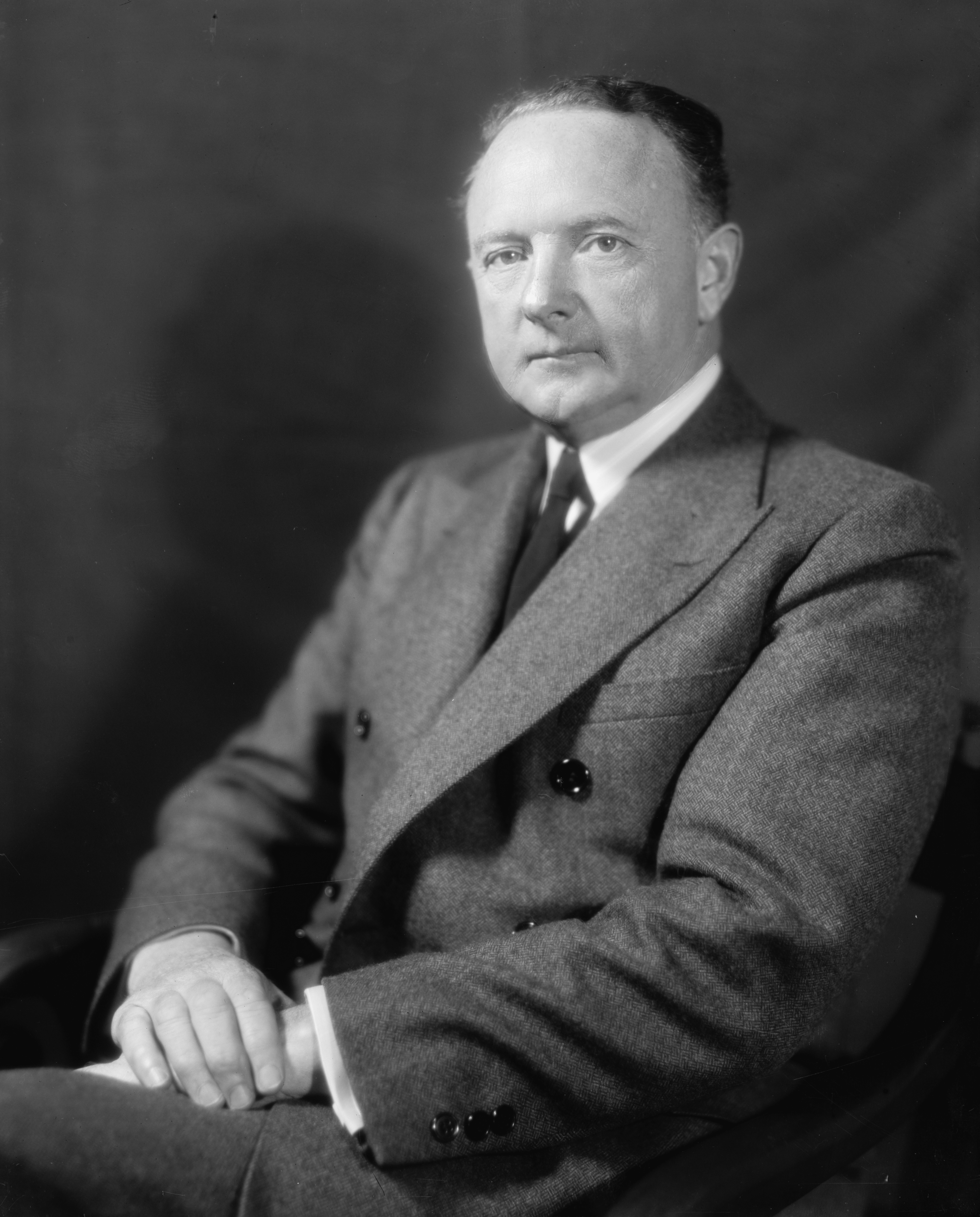
Harry F. Byrd Sr. in the 1930s

The Byrd machine, or Byrd Organization, was a political machine of the Democratic Party led by former Governor and U.S. Senator Harry F. Byrd (1887–1966) that dominated Virginia politics for much of the 20th century. From the 1890s until the late 1960s, the Byrd organization effectively controlled the politics of the state through a network of courthouse cliques of local constitutional officers in most of the state's counties.

"The organization" had its greatest strength in rural areas. It was never able to gain a significant foothold in the growing urban areas of Virginia's many independent cities, which are not located within counties, nor with the emerging suburban middle-class of Virginians after World War II. Byrd's vehement opposition to racial integration of the state's public schools, including a policy of massive resistance, which ultimately failed in 1960 after it was ruled unconstitutional by both state and federal courts, could be described as the organization's "last stand", although the remnants of it continued to wield power for a few years longer.

When the senator resigned in 1965, he was replaced in the Senate by his son Harry F. Byrd Jr. However, the heyday of the Byrd organization was clearly in the past. With the election of a Republican governor in 1969 for the first time in the 20th century, the 80 years of domination of Virginia politics by conservative Democrats ended.

== Background ==
After the American Civil War, Virginia's politics were chaotic. Initially, former Confederates were not allowed to vote, and factions of newly enfranchised black voters joined the electorate. In the late 1870s, a coalition of blacks, Republicans, and populist Democrats formed the Readjuster Party. Readjusters aspired "to break the power of wealth and established privilege" of the planter class elites who had controlled Virginia politics since the colonial era and to promote public education. It was led by Harrison H. Riddleberger (1844–1890) of Woodstock, an attorney, and William Mahone (1827–1895), of Petersburg, a former Confederate general who was president of several railroads.

The Readjuster Party's power was overturned in the late 1880s, when John S. Barbour Jr. (1820–1892) led the first Conservative Democrat political machine in Virginia, known as the Martin organization, aided by a poll tax enacted in 1902 that effectively disenfranchised blacks and poor whites. U.S. Senator Thomas Staples Martin (1847–1919) took over after Barbour died, but Senator Martin's political control was thin by the time he died in office in 1919. By this time, a young state senator from Winchester, Harry F. Byrd, was a rising star in state politics and the Democratic Party. He had served the Wilson Administration during World War I helping with gasoline rationing as a volunteer.

In 1922, with seven years of experience in the Virginia State Senate, Byrd gained statewide prominence by confronting Virginia's powerful lobby of highway builders. Byrd had gained a lot of related experience when earlier managing the Valley Turnpike. In the Virginia General Assembly, he led a fight against using bonded indebtedness as a method to pay for new roads. He feared the state would sacrifice future flexibility by committing too many resources to paying off construction debt.

In 1923, Byrd was sued for libel by the Virginia Highway Contractors Association because he said their activities "by combination and agreements may be very detrimental" to the State. The court dismissed the suit, stating the criticism was legal, imposing all costs upon the association. The publicity figuratively paved the way for the election of Harry Byrd to statewide office.

== Structure ==
The Virginia Democratic machine, since the 1890s, had rigidly stood for restricted suffrage, balanced budgets, and regressive taxation. After the Constitution of 1902 effectively disenfranchised more than half the electorate, the organization had had little trouble winning most Virginia elections.

Harry Byrd's uncle, U.S. Congressman Hal Flood, was one of the organization leaders until his death in 1921, and Byrd's father Richard Evelyn Byrd Sr. had been speaker of the House of Delegates. But Byrd's own cleverness won him the governorship in 1925 at age 38. With intelligence and attention to detail, he soon gained control of the already thirty-year-old organization. He served until 1930, then was elected to the United States Senate in 1933, serving until his retirement in 1965.

Over forty years, Byrd built up relationships with the courthouse cliques, consisting of the constitutional officers in every county. The five (elected) constitutional officers in each county were the sheriff, Commonwealth's attorney, clerk of the court, county treasurer, and commissioner of revenue.

Perhaps contrary to first appearances, the low public profile "clerk of the court" position held the greatest power in most counties within the Byrd organization. These courthouse cliques made recommendations for suitable candidates, and Byrd only decided on candidates after careful consultation. Without Byrd's "nod," no candidate had a chance at statewide office in Virginia.

=== Constitutional amendments ===
One of Byrd's first acts upon taking office was to amend the state constitution to reduce the number of statewide elected offices to just three: governor, lieutenant governor and attorney general. Another amendment required the legislature to reapportion itself every decade – a demand made without any details of apportionment. This move not only centralized power in the governor's hands but also eliminated potential bases for opposition. Several measures that had been in place well before Byrd's time also ensured his dominance, especially the poll tax. This not only effectively stripped blacks and poor whites of the vote, but made the electorate the smallest relative to population in the postbellum United States. The courthouse cliques of the Byrd machine strove to ensure that "reliable" voters' poll taxes were paid on time, often as early as three years before an election. The General Assembly, through circuit court judges, controlled the electoral commissions that ruled on voter eligibility. While the organization never was able to establish a foothold in urban areas, blatant and deliberate malapportionment in favor of rural Southside Virginia and against the strongly Republican southwestern mountains, Democratic western coalfields, as well as the cities ensured statewide dominance.

== Fiscally conservative ==
Byrd made property taxes solely a county and city responsibility. He also had a keen interest in improving roads, dramatically increasing funding for secondary roads. When that was not enough, he pushed through the Byrd Road Act of 1932, a law that created the state's Virginia Secondary Roads System and gave the state responsibility for maintaining county roads, (albeit without similar assistance for Virginia's independent cities). These measures made Byrd seem like a New South progressive at first glance.

However, Byrd's fiscal policy was principled conservatism, restructuring state government to streamline operations and use tax dollars more effectively. Byrd's primary support was among rural voters in his native Shenandoah Valley, as well as Southside. Voters in these areas had less interest in improved state services (other than roads) than in low taxes and limited government. Byrd initiated a "pay as you go" approach to spending, in which no state money was spent until enough taxes and fees were available. While this freed Virginia from having to pay off-road construction debt and kept the state as one of the few to remain solvent during the early years of the Great Depression, it also kept support for higher education and other state services at low levels.

Byrd, like many Americans who grew up before the high school movement, never graduated from high school. He recognized that his rural constituency where most students left school after eighth grade to go to work on the family farm were less interested in state-supplied services like public education than in lower taxes. Rural areas were heavily over-represented in the General Assembly, ensuring that Virginia's per capita expenditures on education and social welfare remained among the lowest in the nation for decades.

George Mason University professor William Grymes has noted that "Byrd's political power was based on the ability of the appointed and elected officials to restrict the number of voters, and ensure those few voters were supporters of the Byrd organization." The courthouse cliques' measures to restrict the number of voters made it possible for Byrd-supported candidates to win with as little as fifteen percent of the potential electorate actually being able to vote.

== Opposing federal laws ==
With this structure in place, Byrd's organization practically selected every governor from 1930 until 1970, even as Virginia became friendlier to Republicans. Many Virginia Democrats began drifting away from the national party due to Franklin D. Roosevelt's support for organized labor during the New Deal. This only accelerated during the Civil Rights Movement, when Byrd drafted the Southern Manifesto in opposition to the U.S. Supreme Court's decision in Brown v. Board of Education (1954). Consequently, many Byrd Democrats began splitting their tickets in national elections as early as the 1930s, well before ticket-splitting became a trend across the South in the 1960s.

This trend was especially pronounced in western Virginia, Byrd's home region. Several counties in that region have not supported a Democrat for president since Roosevelt. For instance, Highland and Shenandoah Counties last supported a Democrat for President in 1932, Page County last supported a Democrat in 1936, while Augusta and Roanoke Counties both last supported a Democrat in the 1944 election.

Byrd was vehemently opposed to racial desegregation even early in the New Deal, and later opposed Presidents Harry S. Truman and John F. Kennedy despite their also being Democrats (as well as losing Democratic Presidential candidate Adlai Stevenson) because they opposed racial segregation within the U.S. military and federal workforce. Meanwhile, conservative Democrats controlled the General Assembly until the mid 1990s.

Some Byrd Democrats, such as Governors John S. Battle and Thomas B. Stanley, were sober enough to realize that racial integration was inevitable, and were willing to take cautious steps toward rolling back Jim Crow laws. However, their efforts were short-circuited in 1954, when a little over a month after the Brown v. Board of Education decision by the U.S. Supreme Court, Byrd vowed to block any attempts to integrate Virginia's public schools. While the state superintendent of education had promised "no defiance of the Supreme Court." Byrd, on the other hand, issued a statement saying Virginia faced "a crisis of the first magnitude" and calling the decision by the Warren Court the "most serious blow" ever to states' rights.

Byrd decreed a policy of "massive resistance" to integrating the state's public schools which he rationalized on anti-miscegenation grounds. Miscegenation was illegal under Virginia's Racial Integrity Act of 1924. He was joined by Virginia's other Senator, A. Willis Robertson, and most other members of the organization. Byrd had a powerful ally in the United States House of Representatives, where the chairman of the House Rules Committee, Howard W. Smith, kept many civil rights bills from even coming to a vote on the floor. Governor Stanley joined with Byrd and Garland Gray, head of the powerful Democratic Caucus in the Virginia Senate, and established the Virginia Public Education Commission, that became known as the Gray Commission, to draft and pass a series of laws known as the Stanley Plan to implement the "massive resistance" program announced in 1956.

After Virginia's school-closing law was ruled unconstitutional in January 1959, the General Assembly repealed the compulsory school attendance law and made the operation of public schools a local option for the state's counties and cities. When journalist Edward R. Murrow, presented the program "The Lost Class of '59" on the CBS television network that focused on the organization's "massive resistance" program that had caused the shuttering of the public schools in several Virginia localities it caused national indignation.

State and federal courts struck down most of the "massive resistance" laws by 1960. In response, Stanley's successor as governor, J. Lindsay Almond Jr., drafted several laws that implemented an extremely gradual desegregation process, popularly known as "passive resistance." Most members of the organization considered "passive resistance" to be rank heresy, as it abandoned white supremacy. In 1968, however, the federal Supreme Court held that this didn't go far enough in Green v. County School Board of New Kent County. By then, continued resistance to integration was almost a moot point because Virginia's anti-miscegenation law that Byrd had used to rationalize "massive resistance" had been overturned in 1967 by the U.S. Supreme Court in Loving v. Virginia. Also by this time, whites in Virginia localities with large black populations had largely abandoned the public schools for private segregation academies or in what became known as white flight fled Richmond and other inner cities for new suburbs just outside the city limits in neighboring rural (and predominately white) counties.

Even before then, the failure of "massive resistance" caused some Byrd Democrats to conclude that segregation could not be maintained forever. For example, in 1963, when the Prince Edward County school board balked at reopening the schools after four years, Governor Albertis S. Harrison advised the board members to comply with a court order to reopen unless they were willing to face prosecution. Earlier, Harrison had led the state's defense of "massive resistance" while serving as attorney general. A number of Byrd Democrats, like Governor Mills Godwin, made efforts to appeal to black voters. Godwin had been one of the leaders of "massive resistance" as a state senator. However, while serving as lieutenant governor under Harrison from 1962 to 1966, he had campaigned for Lyndon Johnson during Johnson's presidential bid, during which he courted black voters as a prelude to his run for governor in 1965. During that latter campaign, Godwin won the endorsement of the Virginia NAACP. However, Byrd, Robertson, Smith, Gray and a few others continued to oppose any form of integration.

== Demise ==
Harry F. Byrd Sr. retired from the U.S. Senate in 1965, and his eldest son, Harry Jr., a State Senator, was appointed to succeed him. In one of the first major cracks in the Byrd organization, a Republican won the special election to succeed Harry Jr.; that district and its successors have been in GOP hands since.

Harry Sr. died in 1966. A short time before his death, two of Harry Sr.'s longtime allies were ousted in the Democratic primary by more liberal challengers. Senator Robertson, a 20-year incumbent, was defeated by State Senator William B. Spong Jr., whom President Lyndon Johnson had personally recruited to mount a primary challenge against him. Johnson was angered at Robertson's opposition to the Civil Rights and Voting Rights Acts. Also, Congressman Smith, a three-decade incumbent, was defeated by State Delegate George Rawlings. Harry Jr. himself barely survived a primary challenge in his bid for the balance of his father's sixth term. While Spong and Harry Jr. went on to victory in November, Rawlings was defeated by conservative Republican William L. Scott, who gained the support of many conservative Democrats. A series of Supreme Court rulings imposing one man, one vote on state legislatures eliminated the rural advantages that served as the core of the Byrd organization's power.

The Byrd organization finally broke down in 1969, when a split in the Democratic Party allowed A. Linwood Holton Jr., a moderate Republican and opponent of segregation, to become the state's first Republican governor since Reconstruction. A year later, Republicans won six of the state's ten congressional districts – the first time Republicans had held a majority of the state's congressional delegation since Reconstruction. Ironically, one of the districts that turned Republican was the 7th District, the Byrds' home district. Holton was succeeded in 1974 by Godwin, a former Byrd organization Democrat who had turned Republican. (Godwin had earlier served a term as governor, 1966-1970 as a Democrat, the last of the Byrd organization members to hold the state's top office.) Meanwhile, despite the end of the organization, Harry Byrd Jr., who himself had left the Democratic Party in 1970 declaring himself an Independent Democrat, remained in the U.S. Senate until his retirement in 1983.

== Legacy ==
The Byrd organization's response to federal desegregation orders in the 1950s has shaped the contours of the state's social, economic and political landscape into the 21st century. Massive Resistance hurt Virginia in numerous ways. It worsened race relations by convincing blacks that white politicians would not treat them fairly and that the courts were the only branch of government they could trust. When state leaders ultimately failed to block integration, it made white citizens skeptical of all political promises. Massive Resistance also distracted Virginia from the task of improving public education, diverting money and attention from the real needs of the state's long underfunded public schools to private segregation academies. It also harmed economic development in Virginia by causing national corporations to become reluctant to locate in a state that by the 1960s was, like the rest of the South, increasingly seen as a cultural backwater by much of the nation due to its Jim Crow laws. The segregationist rhetoric of Byrd, Robertson and Smith in Washington and other Democrats in state government including Governor Almond, who did not appear to value public education, further tarnished the state's image.

The Byrd machine's ability to oversee 11 successful consecutive gubernatorial elections and administrations of governors over a 44-year period was unmatched by all other Southern Democratic political machines.

== See also ==
- Joel Broyhill
- Robert Young Button
- Pendergast organization

== Works cited ==
- Moreland, Laurence W.; Baker, Tod A.; Steed, Robert P., eds. (1982). Contemporary Southern Political Attitudes and Behavior: Studies and Essays. Praeger. ISBN 9780030604249.
