= Virginia's 26th Senate district =

American legislative district

Virginia's 26th State Senate district
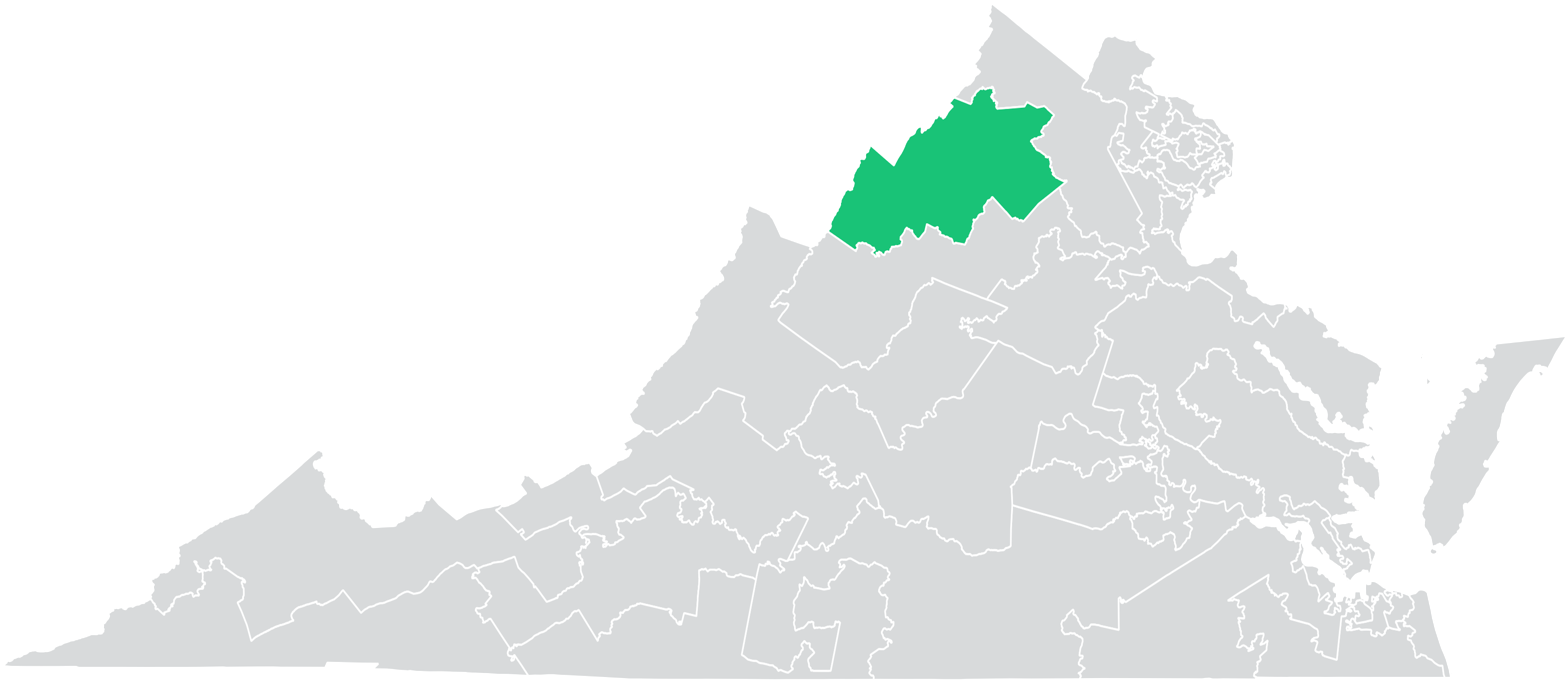
Senator
Ryan McDougle; R–Mechanicsville
- Demographics: 83% White; 3% Black; 9% Hispanic; 2% Asian; 2% Other
- Population (2019): 210,548
- Registered voters: 132,584

Virginia's 26th Senate district is one of 40 districts in the Senate of Virginia. It is currently represented by Ryan T. McDougle, who had represented the 4th District since 2006. Before the district moved, it was represented by Republican Mark Obenshain from 2004 to 2024, succeeding fellow Republican Kevin Miller.

== Geography ==
The Virginia Supreme Court approved the current district map in December of 2021, following the 2020 Census, and the changes took effect for the 2023 elections. The new map reassigned the numerical indices of the Senate districts in such a way that District 26 was effectively relocated. The district now covers all of New Kent County, Gloucester County, Mathews County, the majority of James City County, and parts of Hanover County and King and Queen County. It includes the town of Mechanicsville (northeast of Richmond) and parts of Hampton Roads.

Prior to redistricting, District 26 was located in the upper Shenandoah Valley, covering Page County, Rappahannock County, Shenandoah County, Warren County, the City of Harrisonburg, and part of Rockingham County. These localities are now split between the 1st and 2nd District.

The district is located entirely within Virginia's 1st congressional district, and overlaps with the 60th, 68th, 69th, and 71st districts of the Virginia House of Delegates.

== Recent election results ==
=== 2019 ===
County and independent city results Obenshain: 50–60%; 60–70%; 70–80%; Moore: 60–70%

2019 Virginia Senate election, District 26
Party	Candidate	Votes	%
Republican	Mark Obenshain (incumbent)	36,998	64.9
Democratic	April Moore	19,948	35.0
Total votes		57,020	100
Republican hold			

=== 2015 ===
County and independent city results Obenshain: 50–60%; 60–70%; 70–80%; Moore: 50–60%

2015 Virginia Senate election, District 26
Party	Candidate	Votes	%
Republican	Mark Obenshain (incumbent)	25,042	68.7
Democratic	April Moore	11,308	31.0
Total votes		36,439	100
Republican hold			

=== 2011 ===
2011 Virginia Senate election, District 26
Party	Candidate	Votes	%
Republican	Mark Obenshain (incumbent)	27,999	97.1
Write-in		838	2.9
Total votes		28,837	100
Republican hold			

=== Federal and statewide results ===
Year	Office	Results
2021	Governor	Youngkin 71.3–28.0
2020	President	Trump 63.6–34.6%
2017	Governor	Gillespie 62.3–36.4%
2016	President	Trump 62.0–32.7%
2014	Senate	Gillespie 64.0–33.4%
2013	Governor	Cuccinelli 59.7–34.8%
2012	President	Romney 59.8–38.5%
2012	Senate	Allen 60.7–39.3%

== Historical results ==
All election results below took place prior to 2011 redistricting, and thus were under different district lines.

=== 2007 ===
2007 Virginia Senate election, District 26
Party	Candidate	Votes	%
Republican	Mark Obenshain (incumbent)	25,955	70.4
Democratic	Maxine Hope Roles	10,862	29.5
Total votes		36,864	100
Republican hold			

=== 2003 ===
2003 Virginia Senate election, District 26
Party	Candidate	Votes	%
Republican	Mark Obenshain	26,771	67.9
Independent	Rodney Eagle	12,457	31.6
Total votes		39,422	100
Republican hold			

=== 1999 ===
1999 Virginia Senate election, District 26
Party	Candidate	Votes	%
Republican	Kevin Miller (incumbent)	27,366	99.0
Total votes		27,656	100
Republican hold			

=== 1995 ===
1995 Virginia Senate election, District 26
Party	Candidate	Votes	%
Republican	Kevin Miller (incumbent)	28,356	99.9
Total votes		28,381	100
Republican hold			
