= Terry McAuliffe 2013 gubernatorial campaign =

Former political campaign in Virginia

Terry McAuliffe for Governor
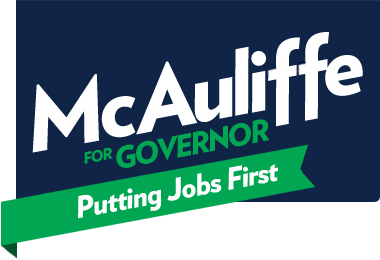
- Campaign: Virginia gubernatorial election, 2013
- Candidate: Terry McAuliffe; Former Chairman of the Democratic National Committee 2001–2005
- Affiliation: Democratic Party
- Status: Won election November 5, 2013
- Key people: Robby Mook (manager); Levar Stoney (deputy manager)

Website
- Official website

The Terry McAuliffe gubernatorial campaign of 2013 began when Terry McAuliffe, the former chairman of the Democratic National Committee, launched his candidacy for governor of Virginia in a bid to win the 2013 gubernatorial election. His candidacy was formally announced on November 8, 2012 through an email to his supporters. On April 2, 2013, the Democratic Party of Virginia (DPVA) certified that McAuliffe was the only candidate to file for the June primary, and was therefore the Democratic nominee. On November 5, 2013 McAuliffe was elected governor of Virginia with 47.75% of the vote.

== Campaign background and formation ==
As early as May 2012, there was speculation that McAuliffe was going to run for governor in 2013. He announced in an interview that he would run as long as Senator Mark Warner did not. McAuliffe said that he would be the first person to endorse Warner, and that he "left the door open a little bit" and would wait "for it to be closed before jumping in." On November 8, 2012, McAuliffe sent an email to his supporters announcing his official candidacy for the Democratic Party's nomination. He stated that he had been to every corner of Virginia during the previous four years for over 2,400 meetings and events, and that it was clear to him that Virginians wanted their next governor to focus on job creation and common sense fiscal responsibility instead of divisive partisan issues. He expressed his approval for leaders who prioritize economic growth in order to make Virginia the best place for business.

McAuliffe began to make telephone calls to key Democrats in order to inform them of his intentions to run for governor. During a call with Molly Ward, the mayor of Hampton, he said that Warner had "given him the green light" to continue with his campaign. Warner initially stated that he would announce his decision on whether he would run or not by Thanksgiving. On November 20, he made an official announcement that he would not be running, and would support McAuliffe's campaign.

By mid-November, McAuliffe had started to assemble his campaign team. He selected Robby Mook, the outgoing executive director of the Democratic Congressional Campaign Committee, as his campaign manager, and Levar Stoney, former executive director of the Democratic Party of Virginia, as his deputy campaign manager.

== Campaign for the party nomination ==
Since McAuliffe announced his candidacy, journalists and media outlets reported on his level of support among Virginia Democrats being poor. Many liberal Democrats were unenthusiastic about their choices, although Ken Cuccinelli, McAuliffe's main Republican opponent, received a similar reaction among moderate Republicans, especially those who had previously backed Bill Bolling, who dropped out of the race in November.

=== Economic policy ===
During a news conference on December 5, McAuliffe discussed GreenTech Automotive, a company that he acquired from China in 2009. He stated that the Virginia Economic Development Partnership did not want to bid on the company's plans to manufacture tiny, low-speed, all-electric two-seater cars, so he took them to Mississippi instead. Over 600 pages of notes and emails revealed that Virginia officials were skeptical about these plans because the company would not provide enough details to obtain economic development incentives.

On December 13, McAuliffe toured the Reston Station to speak with construction workers and discuss the needs for infrastructure and transportation improvements. The tour was led by officials of the Comstock Partners company, including CEO Chris Clemente, chief investment officer Steve Trauner, and Director of Communications Maggie Parker. McAuliffe emphasized the effects of job creation transit improvements while speaking at the station.

=== Domestic policy ===
In response to the Sandy Hook shooting in mid-December, McAuliffe called for improved mental health care and greater gun control in Virginia. He stated that the Commonwealth must prioritize the diagnosis, treatment, and awareness of mental health issues, and also that he supported a renewal of the assault weapons ban, passage of bipartisan legislature to strengthen background checks, and re-implementation of Virginia's "one-gun-a-month" rule, which limited individual gun purchases to once per month.

McAuliffe released a statement two days later in which he supported bipartisan legislation to station more school resource officers at elementary schools. As of 2007, only 1% of elementary schools in Virginia had access to these law enforcement officials, compared to 74% of middle schools and 95% of high schools.

== General election ==
=== Fundraising ===
Through the August 31, 2013 reporting period, McAuliffe raised over $20 million and spent $15 million. As of August 31, 2013, the campaign had $5 million cash on hand.

Through the second quarter of 2013, McAuliffe's funds included $4.7 million from the Democratic Governors Association PAC; $295,000 he donated to himself; $250,000 from Baltimore Orioles owner Peter Angelos; $100,005 from his father-in-law, Richard Swann; and $100,000 from Bill Clinton. Through the first quarter of 2013, 72% of McAuliffe's campaign contributors were from Virginia, but 78% of his total funds came from donors from outside Virginia.

=== NVTC TechPAC endorsement ===
In September 2013, the business group Northern Virginia Technology Council's political arm, NVTC TechPAC, endorsed Cuccinelli for governor after interviewing both candidates. Board members said McAuliffe was his "flamboyant, normal self", "uninformed and superficial", "didn't want to get pinned down to any details", and seemed to "wing it" in their interview. According to two board members present at the interview, when asked how he planned to get things done in Richmond, he replied, "I’m an Irish Catholic. I like to drink. It is what is. We’ll go have lunch. We’ll go have drinks. We’ll work the phones. We’ll do whatever it takes to get things done." He also said, "I am not going to read every bill when I’m governor. I’m going to hire people to read them for me." Upon learning of the endorsement, McAuliffe's campaign and supporters launched a furious effort to try to force the group to reverse its decision. State Senator Janet Howell, a Democrat from Fairfax County, emailed the PAC warning that the response from Senate Democrats would be "frigid" when the NVTC sought help with its legislative agenda. Howell's sentiment was echoed by Democratic Minority Leader Dick Saslaw and Sen. Barbara Favola. TechPAC's chairman said the pressure was "hot and heavy", and the group delayed announcing the endorsement, but followed through and officially endorsed Cuccinelli the next week.
