= 2013 United States state legislative elections =

- November 5, 2013

3 legislative chambers 2 states
	Majority party	Minority party	Third party
Party	Republican	Democratic	Coalition
Chambers before	58	39	2 (Note: The New York Senate was controlled by a coalition of Republicans and members of the Independent Democratic Conference. In the Washington State Senate, two Democrats caucused with Republicans to form the Majority Coalition Caucus. Three additional Democrats also caucused with the majority.)
Chambers after	58	39	2
Overall change	Steady	Steady	Steady
- Map of upper house elections: Democrats retained control No regularly-scheduled elections

- Map of lower house elections: Democrats retained control Republicans retained control No regularly-scheduled elections

The 2013 United States state legislative elections were held on November 5, 2013. Three legislative chambers in two states held regularly scheduled elections. These off-year elections coincided with other state and local elections, including gubernatorial elections in two states.

Legislative elections were held for the New Jersey Senate, New Jersey General Assembly, and the Virginia House of Delegates. In New Jersey, Democrats retained control of their majorities in the Senate and General Assembly. Republicans held a majority in the Virginia House of Delegates.

== Summary table ==
Regularly scheduled elections were held in 3 of the 99 state legislative chambers in the United States. Nationwide, regularly scheduled elections were held for 220 of the 7,383 legislative seats. This table only covers regularly scheduled elections; additional special elections took place concurrently with these regularly scheduled elections.

State	Upper House				Lower House			
State	Seats up	Total	% up	Term	Seats up	Total	% up	Term
New Jersey	40	40	100	2/4 (Note: The upper houses of Arkansas, Delaware, Florida, Hawaii, Illinois, Minnesota, New Jersey, and Texas use a 2-4-4 term length system.)	80	80	100	4
Virginia	0	40	0	4	100	100	100	2

== State summaries ==
=== New Jersey ===
All seats of the New Jersey Senate and the New Jersey General Assembly were up for election. Senators were elected to four-year terms in single-member districts, while Assembly members were elected to two-year terms in two-member districts. Democrats retained majority control in both chambers.

Senate
Party	Leader	Before	After	Change
Democratic	Stephen Sweeney	24	24	Steady
Republican	Thomas Kean Jr.	16	16	Steady
Total		40	40	

General Assembly
Party	Leader	Before	After	Change
Democratic	Sheila Oliver	48	48	Steady
Republican	Jon Bramnick	32	32	Steady
Total		80	80	

=== Virginia ===
All seats of the Virginia House of Delegates are up for election; the Virginia Senate will not hold regularly scheduled elections in 2013. Delegates are elected to two-year terms in single-member districts. Republicans maintained a majority.

House of Delegates
Party	Leader	Before	After	Change
Republican	William J. Howell	67	67	Steady
Independent	Lacey Putney	1	0	▼1
Democratic	David Toscano	32	33	▲1
Total		100	100	

== Special elections ==
=== Maine ===
District		Incumbent			This race	
Chamber	No.	Representative	Party	First elected	Results	Candidates
Senate	19	Seth Goodall	Democratic	2008	Incumbent resigned to join the Small Business Administration. New member elected August 27, 2013. Democratic Hold.	▌ ✓ Eloise Vitelli (Democratic) 50.6%; ▌ Paula Benoit (Republican) 45.5%; ▌ Daniel Stromgren (Green) 3.9%

== Recall elections ==
=== Colorado ===
District		Incumbent			This race	
Chamber	No.	Representative	Party	First elected	Results	Vote
Senate	3	Angela Giron	Democratic	2010	Recall election passed September 10, 2013.	✓ Yes 55.85%; No 44.15%
Senate	11	John Morse	Democratic	2006	Recall election passed September 10, 2013.	✓ Yes 50.89%; No 49.11%

== See also ==
- 2013 United States gubernatorial elections
