= Virginia's 31st Senate district =

American legislative district

Virginia's 31st State Senate district
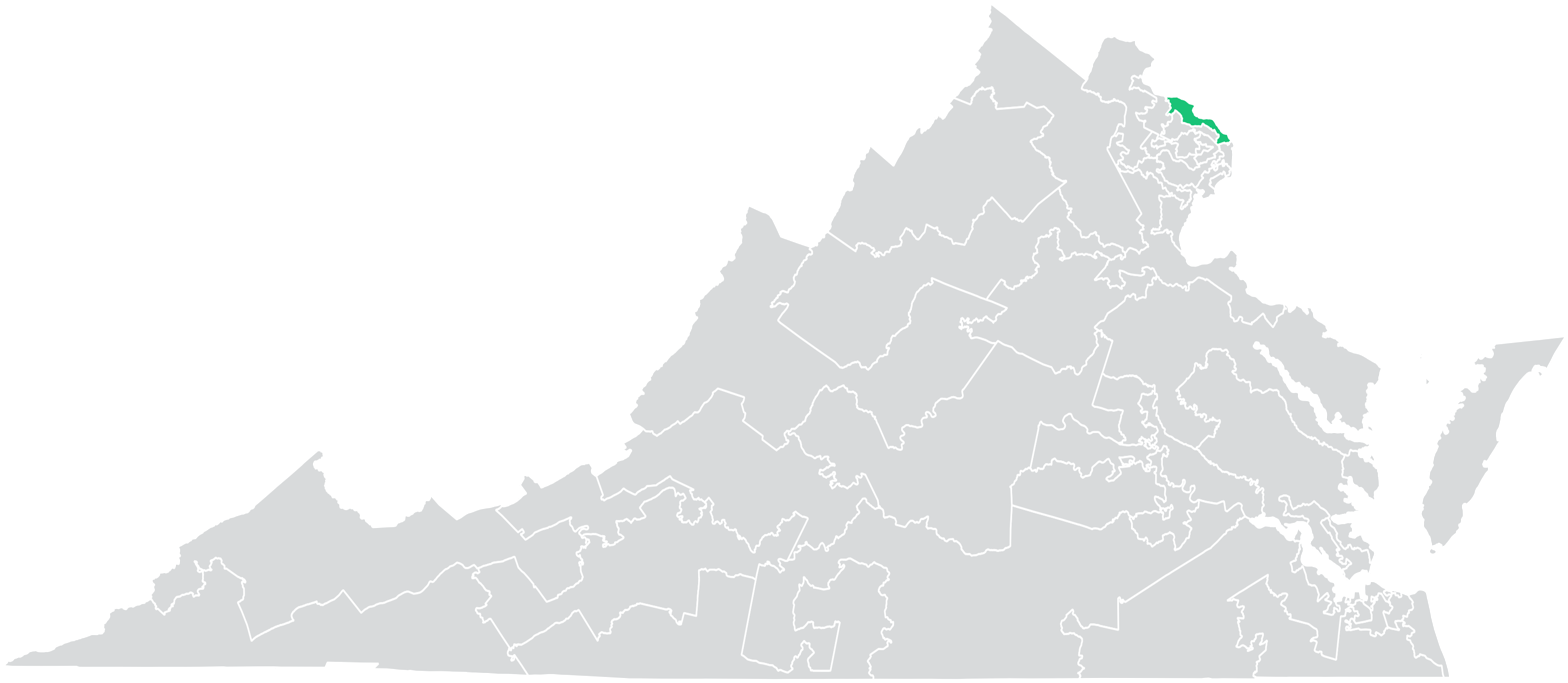
Senator
Russet Perry; D–Round Hill
- Demographics: 64% White; 6% Black; 12% Hispanic; 13% Asian; 3% Other
- Population (2019): 213,237
- Registered voters: 160,781

Virginia's 31st Senate district is one of 40 districts in the Senate of Virginia. It had been represented by Democrat Barbara Favola since 2012, succeeding retiring fellow Democrat Mary Margaret Whipple. After Favola was redistricted into the 40th Senate District, in the 2023 Virginia Senate election, Democrat Russet Perry was elected.

== Geography ==
District 31 stretches along the Potomac River in parts of Arlington, Fairfax, and Loudoun counties, including some or all of McLean, Langley, Great Falls, and Lowes Island. The sections of Arlington covered include the neighborhoods of Arlington Forest, Arlington View, Ballston, Cherrydale, Clarendon, Courthouse, Glen Carlyn, Lyon Village, Rosslyn, Virginia Square and Westover.

The district overlaps with Virginia's 8th and 10th congressional districts, and with the 34th, 47th, 48th, 49th, and 86th districts of the Virginia House of Delegates. It lies directly across the river from Maryland and the District of Columbia.

== Recent election results ==
=== 2019 ===
2019 Virginia Senate election, District 31
Party	Candidate	Votes	%
Democratic	Barbara Favola (incumbent)	46,655	91.6
Total votes		50,914	100
Democratic hold			

=== 2015 ===
2015 Virginia Senate election, District 31
Party	Candidate	Votes	%
Democratic	Barbara Favola (incumbent)	26,373	62.3
Republican	George Farakis	15,904	37.5
Total votes		42,358	100
Democratic hold			

=== 2011 ===
2011 Virginia Senate election, District 31
Primary election
Party	Candidate	Votes	%
Democratic	Barbara Favola	6,549	64.7
Democratic	Jaime Areizaga-Soto	3,575	35.3
Total votes		10,124	100
General election
Democratic	Barbara Favola	24,349	58.1
Republican	Caren Merrick	17,484	41.7
Total votes		41,912	100
Democratic hold			

=== Federal and statewide results ===
Year	Office	Results
2021	Governor	McAuliffe 76.7–22.6%
2020	President	Biden 71.6–26.6%
2017	Governor	Northam 71.6–27.5%
2016	President	Clinton 69.2–24.9%
2014	Senate	Warner 61.7–36.1%
2013	Governor	McAuliffe 63.0–31.2%
2012	President	Obama 61.0–37.7%
2012	Senate	Kaine 63.7–36.3%

== Historical results ==
All election results below took place prior to 2011 redistricting, and thus were under different district lines.

=== 2007 ===
2007 Virginia Senate election, District 31
Party	Candidate	Votes	%
Democratic	Mary Margaret Whipple (incumbent)	23,380	82.6
Independent	Samuel Burley	4,676	16.5
Total votes		28,297	100
Democratic hold			

=== 2003 ===
2003 Virginia Senate election, District 31
Party	Candidate	Votes	%
Democratic	Mary Margaret Whipple (incumbent)	23,015	69.4
Republican	Kamal Nawash	10,053	30.3
Total votes		33,168	100
Democratic hold			

=== 1999 ===
1999 Virginia Senate election, District 31
Party	Candidate	Votes	%
Democratic	Mary Margaret Whipple (incumbent)	22,873	70.3
Republican	Scott Tate	9,656	29.7
Total votes		32,551	100
Democratic hold			

=== 1995 ===
1995 Virginia Senate election, District 31
Party	Candidate	Votes	%
Democratic	Mary Margaret Whipple	23,898	68.6
Republican	David Oblon	10,898	31.3
Total votes		34,824	100
Democratic hold			

== District officeholders ==
Years	Senator, District 31	Counties/cities in district
1940–1942	Henry T. Wickham (D)	Caroline County, Essex County, Goochland County, Hanover County, King and Queen County, King William County, Middlesex County
1942–1944	Thomas H. Blanton (D)	Caroline County, Essex County, Goochland County, Hanover County, King and Queen County, King William County, Middlesex County
1944–1948	Thomas H. Blanton (D)	Caroline County, Essex County, Goochland County, Hanover County, King and Queen County, King William County, Middlesex County
1948–1952	Thomas H. Blanton (D)	Caroline County, Essex County, Goochland County, Hanover County, King and Queen County, King William County, Middlesex County
1952–1956	Thomas H. Blanton (D)	Caroline County, Essex County, Goochland County, Hanover County, King and Queen County, King William County, Middlesex County
1956–1960	W. Marvin Minter (D)	Gloucester County, James City County, New Kent County, Mathews County, City of Warwick, City of Williamsburg, York County
1960–1964	Fred W. Bateman (D)	Gloucester County, James City County, New Kent County, Mathews County, City of Newport News (part), City of Williamsburg, York County
1964–1968	Hunter Andrews (D)	City of Hampton, City of Newport News (part)
1968–1972	No member elected	District was defunct as a result of redistricting
1972–1976	Edward M. Holland (D)	Arlington County (part)
1976–1980	Edward M. Holland (D)	Arlington County (part)
1980–1984	Edward M. Holland (D)	Arlington County (part)
1984–1988	Edward M. Holland (D)	Arlington County (part)
1988–1992	Edward M. Holland (D)	Arlington County (part)
1992–1996	Edward M. Holland (D)	Arlington County (part), City of Falls Church.
1996–2000	Mary Margaret Whipple (D)	Arlington County (part), City of Falls Church.
2000–2004	Mary Margaret Whipple (D)	Arlington County (part), City of Falls Church.
2004–2008	Mary Margaret Whipple (D)	Arlington County (part), City of Falls Church, Fairfax County (part).
2008–2012	Mary Margaret Whipple (D)	Arlington County (part), City of Falls Church, Fairfax County (part).
2012–2016	Barbara Favola (D)	Arlington County (part), Fairfax County (part) and Loudoun County (part).
2016–present	Barbara Favola (D)	Arlington County (part), Fairfax County (part) and Loudoun County (part).
