= Pike Transit Initiative =

Transportation improvement project in Virginia, United States

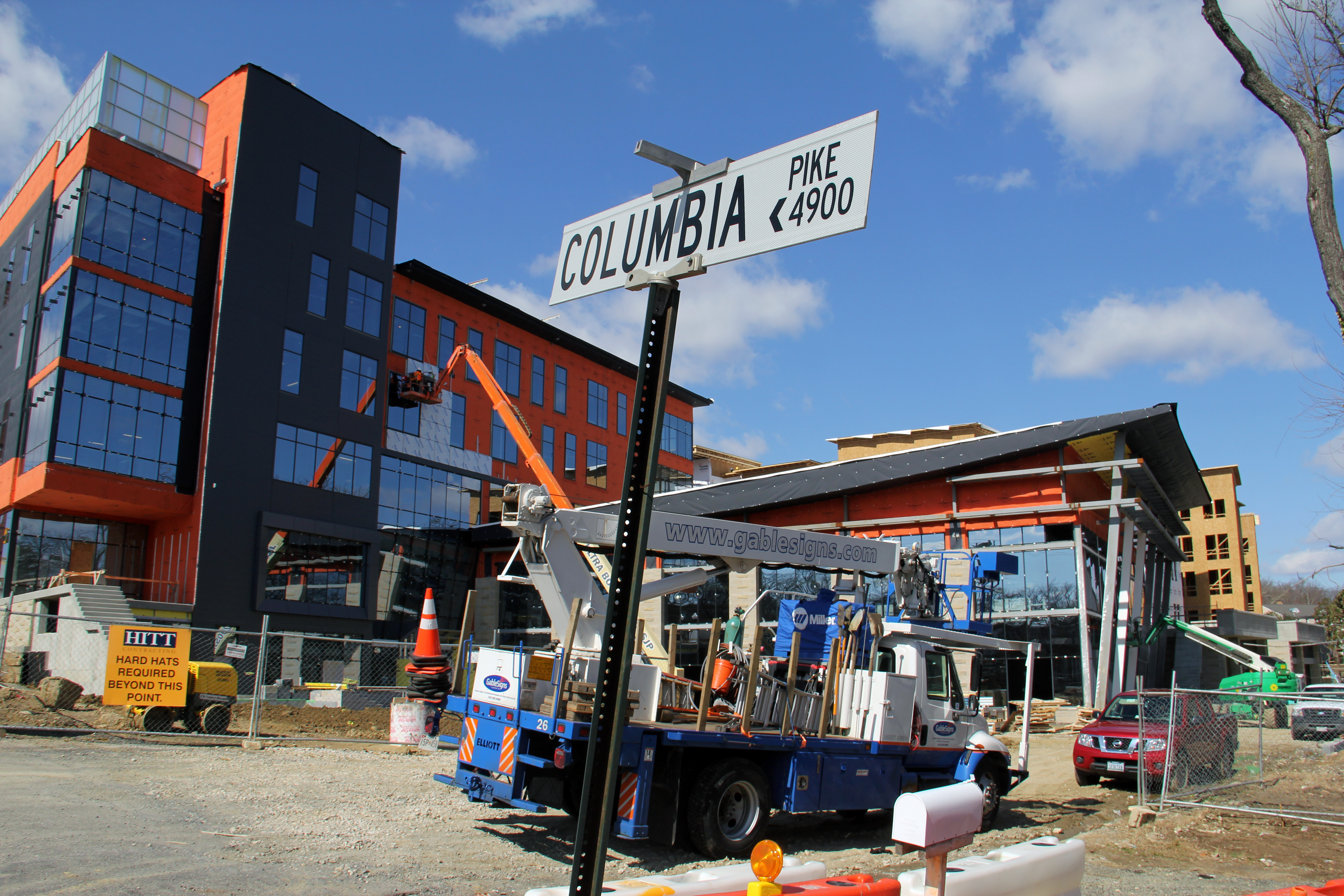
Construction along Columbia Pike in 2013

The Pike Transit Initiative is a collaborative project in Northern Virginia between Arlington and Fairfax counties and the Washington Metropolitan Area Transit Authority to bring transit improvements to the Columbia Pike corridor. Officially known as the Columbia Pike Transit Alternatives Analysis, the project began in 2003. Following three successive defeats of county board candidates who supported the streetcar proposal in 2014, the project was shelved indefinitely.

== Pike Ride ==
Pike Ride, a specially-branded set of bus lines, run along Columbia Pike to the Pentagon and Pentagon City Metro stations. Currently, 17,000 people ride buses along Columbia Pike each day. Service is provided by Metrobus and Arlington Transit.

== Streetcar ==
In 2006, the Arlington and Fairfax County governments approved a "Modified Streetcar Alternative" for the corridor, which involves building a streetcar line while retaining extensive bus service. The 4.7-mile streetcar line is expected to cost $138.5 million. The first streetcar was expected to begin service in 2011.

The Northern Virginia Transportation Authority approved $36.9 million for the streetcar in January 2008. However, since then, the Virginia Supreme Court ruled that the Authority may not collect taxes, as it isn't an elected body. This leaves funding for the streetcar project in limbo.

According to Arlington Now, freshman County Board member Libby Garvey was the sole board member elected at the last election to oppose construction of a streetcar. Garvey quoted mayor of Toronto Rob Ford's criticisms of streetcars, only to realize his credibility had been eroded due to a series of scandals.

Garvey stirred further controversy in 2014 when she supported and raised funds for John Vihstadt, an Independent, instead of fellow Democrat Alan Howse, because he agreed with her opposition to the streetcar line. Vihstadt upended Arlington politics in 2014 by becoming the first non-Democrat to land a seat on the county board in 15 years, winning on the strength of his objections to high-cost projects such as the Columbia Pike streetcar, the Long Bridge aquatics center and a million-dollar bus stop. Garvey defended her defection by asserting her most important obligation was to voters, not to the Democratic Party machinery, and resigned from the local Party apparatus.

In late November 2014 the County Board cancelled the streetcar plan. Eric Jaffe, writing in CityLab, characterized the cancellation as "abrupt" and acrimonious. According to Jaffe, the alternate plan under consideration would follow the same route as the streetcar plan, would stop at the same locations, and would use similar stations, all door boarding, and fare pre-payment, like the streetcar plan, except it would use buses rather than streetcars.
