= Barbara Favola =

American politician (born 1955)

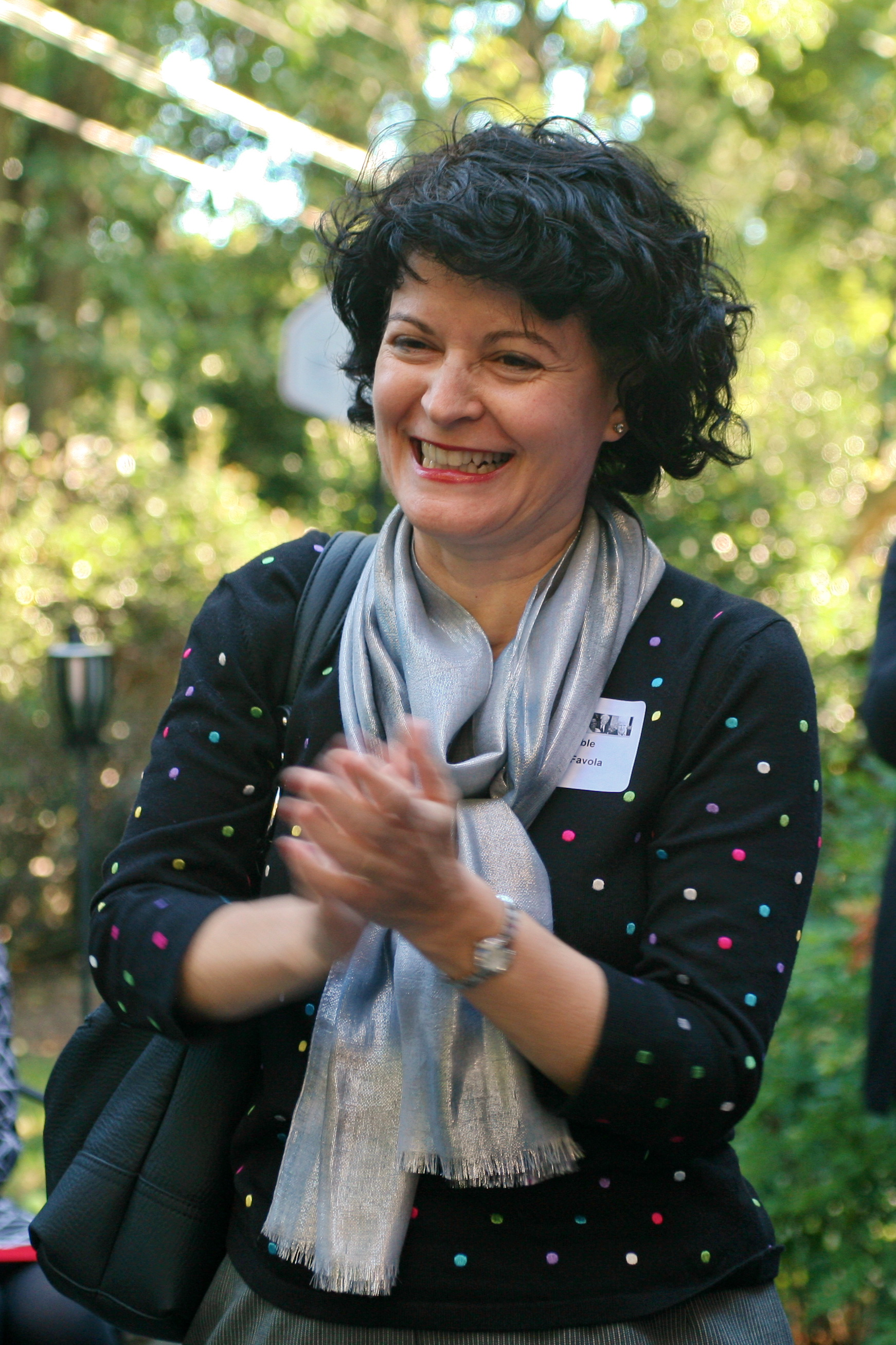

Member of the Virginia Senate
- Incumbent
- Assumed office January 11, 2012
- Preceded by: Mary Margaret Whipple
- Constituency: 31st District (2012–2024); 40th District (since 2024)

Member of the Arlington County Board
- In office November 1997 – December 2012
- Preceded by: James B. Hunter
- Succeeded by: Libby Garvey

Personal details
- Born: June 21, 1955 (age 71) New London, Connecticut
- Party: Democratic
- Spouse: Douglas
- Children: Donald Patrick
- Education: New York University; Saint Joseph College
- Profession: Health Policy Advisor
- Committees: Rehabilitation and Social Services (Chair); Agriculture, Conservation and Natural Resources; Finance and Appropriations; Education and Health; Rules
- Website: barbarafavola.org

Barbara A. Favola (born June 21, 1955) is an American politician who has served in the Virginia Senate since 2012. A Democrat, she currently represents Virginia's 40th Senate district, which encompasses most of Arlington County. Prior to legislative redistricting that took effect during Virginia's 2023 elections, Favola spent three terms representing the state's 31st Senate district, which, less compact than her current district is, encompassed portions of Fairfax and Loudoun counties in addition to Arlington.

First elected to the Virginia Senate to replace retiring Democrat Mary Margaret Whipple, Favola had previously served on the Arlington County Board for fifteen years. Her tenure on the board included three nonconsecutive single year terms as Chair. Prior to entering elected politics, she worked for fifteen years as a policy advisor at the United States Department of Health and Human Services. She has since worked as an assistant for government relations at Marymount University.

== Early career and Arlington County Board ==
Prior to entering elected office, Favola spent fifteen years as a policy advisor at the United States Department of Health and Human Services. Her work there involved overseeing programs related to preventative health measures and promoting access to health services. During that time, she also served on multiple advisory groups for Arlington County, where she first began residing in 1982. She was a Democratic primary candidate for a seat on the Arlington County Board in 1995 but was defeated by Paul Ferguson. Ahead of that campaign, she resigned from her work with the federal government and began a position assisting with government relations for the president of Marymount University. She ran again for the Arlington County Board in 1997 and was elected to replace James B. Hunter III, who was retiring.

From 1997 until 2012, Favola was a member of the Arlington County Board; she served as Chair of the Board in 2000, 2004, and 2009. She served as Vice Chair in 1999, 2003 and 2008.

In 2006, while continuing to serve on the Arlington County Board, Favola was appointed by then-Virginia Governor Tim Kaine to a four-year term on the State Health Board.

During the 2008 Democratic Presidential primary, Favola endorsed Hillary Clinton.

== Virginia Senate ==
In 2011, Favola was elected to the Virginia Senate from the 31st district, replacing retiring Democrat Mary Margaret Whipple. At that time, the district encompassed central and north Arlington, parts of Fairfax County, (including Great Falls and a portion of McClean), and northeastern Loudoun County. In the Democratic primary, Favola's opponent was Jaime Areizaga-Soto, a lawyer who had worked for the general counsel's office at the United States Agency for International Development. In the general election, Favola's opponent was tech entrepreneur Caren Merrick, who a decade later became Virginia Secretary of Commerce under Governor Glenn Youngkin. Favola defeated Merrick with 58% of the vote.

In July 2013, Favola became the first elected official to call on Republican Governor Bob McDonnell to resign over a scandal regarding improperly received gifts. McDonnell was later convicted on federal corruption charges over the scandal, though the conviction was ultimately overturned by the United States Supreme Court. While Virginia State Senator Chap Petersen had previously called on McDonnell to either return the gifts or resign, Favola "went further" according to The Washington Post when she said "I don't see the purpose of the governor continuing in office when the trust between his office and Virginians has been so eroded."

In 2015, Favola was elected to a second term in the Virginia Senate, defeating Republican George Forakis with 62% of the vote. She was uncontested in the Democratic primary that year.

In 2019, Favola was challenged in the Democratic primary by community activist Nicole Merlene, who criticized Favola's history of accepting campaign donations from Dominion Energy. Ahead of the 2019 primary, Favola ceased accepting these donations. After advancing through the primary, she was elected to her third term in the Virginia Senate, running unopposed in the 2019 general election.

Ahead of the 2020 legislative session, Favola was chosen, alongside Lionell Spruill, as Co-Whip for Democrats in the Virginia Senate. Since 2023, she has served in that position alongside Lamont Bagby.

When Favola ran for re-election in 2023, she did so from Virginia's 40th Senate district, as a result of legislative redistricting that had occurred in 2021; the state's 40th district as drawn in 2021 contains only parts of Arlington County, making it more compact than Favola's previous district. Running for her fourth term in 2023, Favola was challenged in the Democratic primary by attorney James DeVita and advanced with 83.74% of the vote. She was then challenged in the general election by Republican David Henshaw and won with 80.92% of the vote.

Favola has chaired the Senate Education and Health Committee since 2026. She currently serves on the Finance and Appropriations, Rehabilitation and Social Services, Courts of Justice, and Rules committees.

Favola has passed over 146 bills that have been signed into law during her time in the state Senate. In 2019, Favola sponsored a bill that would protect individuals with a severe mental illness from receiving the death penalty. In 2020, she sponsored a bill aimed at preventing balance billing for Virginia residents who unknowingly receive out-of-network medical care. The bill was signed into law by Governor Ralph Northam.

Senate of Virginia
Preceded by Mary Margaret Whipple	Member of the Virginia Senate from the 31st district 2012–2024	Succeeded by Russet Perry
Preceded by Todd Pillion	Member of the Virginia Senate from the 40th district 2024–Present	Incumbent
