= 2013 Virginia gubernatorial election =

- November 5, 2013
- Turnout: 43.0% ▲2.6
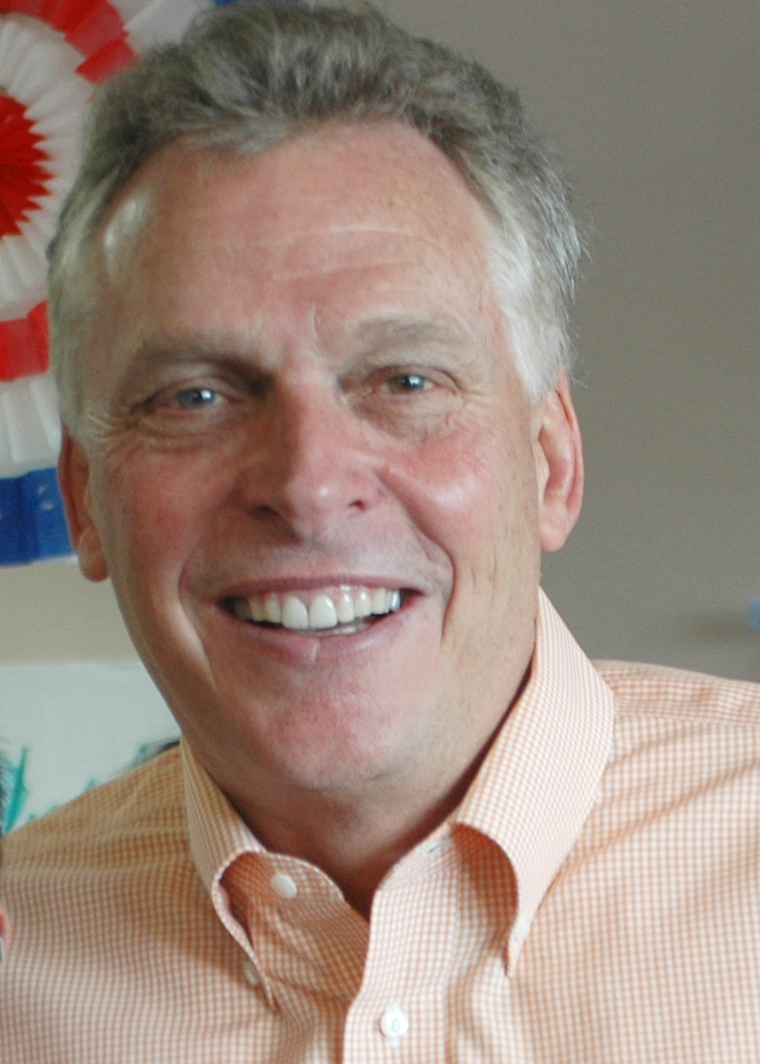

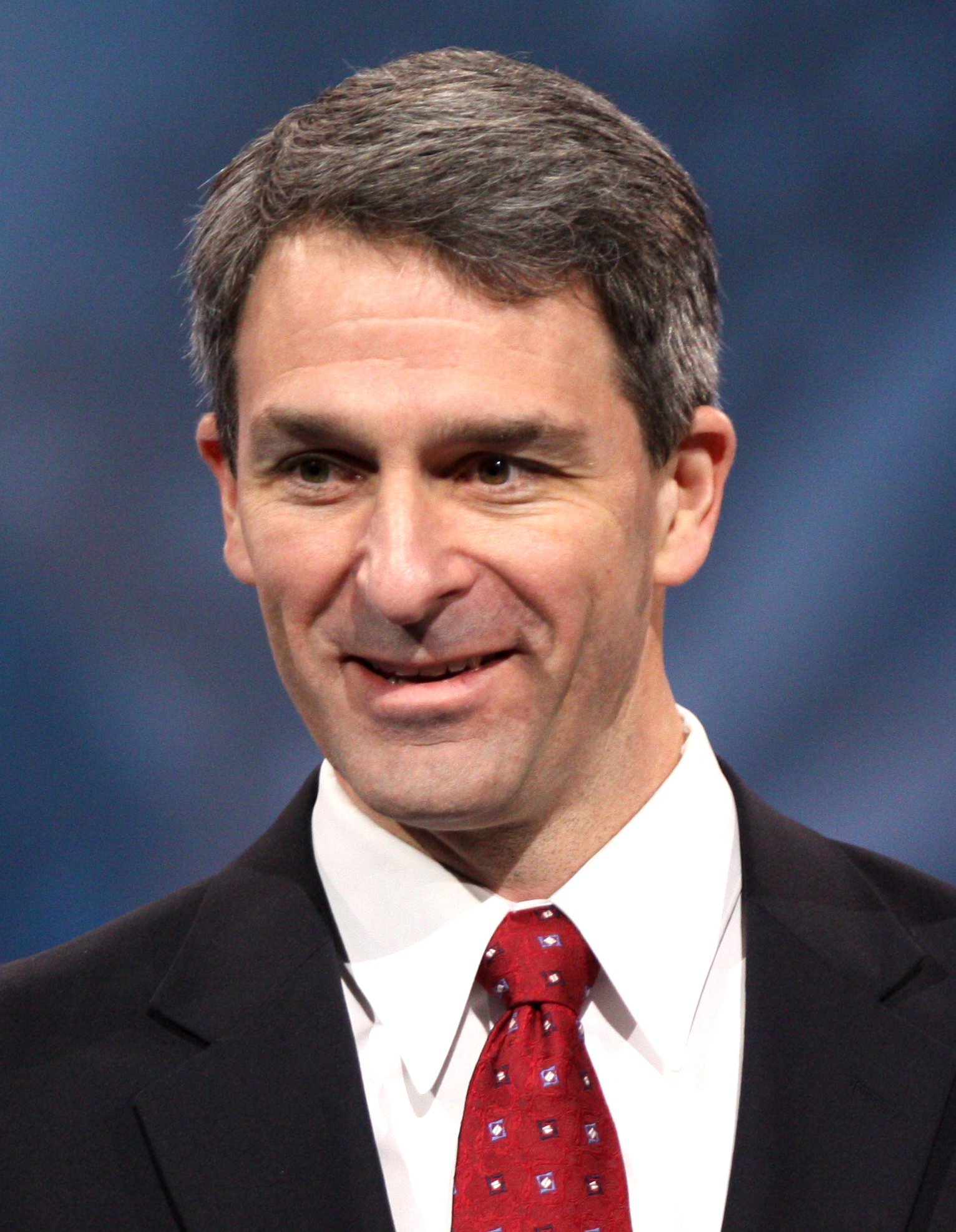

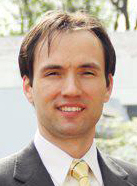
Nominee	Terry McAuliffe	Ken Cuccinelli	Robert Sarvis
Party	Democratic	Republican	Libertarian
Popular vote	1,069,789	1,013,354	146,084
Percentage	47.74%	45.22%	6.52%
- McAuliffe: 40–50% 50–60% 60–70% 70–80% 80–90% >90% Cuccinelli: 40–50% 50–60% 60–70% 70–80% 80–90% >90% Tie: 40–50% No votes
Governor before election
Bob McDonnell
Republican
Elected Governor
Terry McAuliffe
Democratic

The 2013 Virginia gubernatorial election was held on November 5, 2013, to elect the next governor of Virginia. The election was held concurrently with other elections for Virginia's statewide offices, the House of Delegates, and other United States offices. Incumbent Republican governor Bob McDonnell was ineligible to run for re-election, as the Constitution of Virginia prohibits its governors from serving consecutive terms. This was the fifth consecutive election in which the Republican nominee was an attorney general of Virginia.

Three candidates appeared on the ballot for governor: Republican Ken Cuccinelli, the attorney general of Virginia; Democrat Terry McAuliffe, a businessman and the former chairman of the Democratic National Committee; and Libertarian Robert Sarvis, a lawyer and businessman.

McAuliffe won the election and was sworn in as governor on January 11, 2014. This was the only Virginia gubernatorial election since 1965 in which no candidate won an outright majority of the vote. This was the first gubernatorial election in which the independent city of Bedford became incorporated into Bedford County.

As of 2026, this remains the only gubernatorial election since 1973 in which the elected governor belonged to the same party as the incumbent U.S. president.

== Candidates ==
=== Republican Party ===
Lieutenant Governor Bill Bolling, elected to the post in 2005, made a deal with McDonnell whereby Bolling would run for re-election as lieutenant governor in 2009, enabling McDonnell to run for governor without a primary, in exchange for McDonnell's support in 2013. After the 2009 election, Bolling made no secret of his intention to run for governor in 2013, while Attorney General of Virginia Ken Cuccinelli openly stated that he was considering three options: a run for re-election as attorney general in 2013, running for the U.S. Senate in 2014, and running for governor in 2013. Cuccinelli announced to colleagues on December 1, 2011, that he was indeed running for governor. Bolling responded on the same day that he was disappointed that Cuccinelli decided to challenge him.

Bolling, who was polling poorly against Cuccinelli, withdrew from the race on November 28, 2012. He cited the Republican Party's decision to move to a nominating convention rather than hold a primary. He ruled out running for another term as lieutenant governor and refused to endorse Cuccinelli. Bolling considered running as an independent, but decided against it. Bolling also rejected the possibility of a write-in campaign.

==== Nominee ====
- Ken Cuccinelli, attorney general of Virginia

Cuccinelli became the de facto nominee after being the only candidate to file to run by the deadline, and was formally nominated at the state Republican convention on May 18, 2013.

==== Withdrew ====
- Bill Bolling, Lieutenant Governor of Virginia

==== Declined ====
- George Allen, former U.S. senator and former governor
- Thomas M. Davis, former U.S. representative
- Jeff McWaters, state senator

==== Polling ====
Poll source	Date(s) administered	Sample size	Margin of error	Bill Bolling	Ken Cuccinelli	Undecided
Quinnipiac	May 30 – June 4, 2012	549	± 4.2%	15%	51%	31%
Public Policy Polling	April 26–29, 2012	400	± 4.9%	23%	51%	22%
Roanoke College	February 13–28, 2012	377	± 5%	18%	37%	44%
Public Policy Polling	December 11–13, 2011	350	± 5.2%	25%	44%	31%
Public Policy Polling	July 21–24, 2011	400	± 4.9%	21%	45%	34%

=== Democratic Party ===
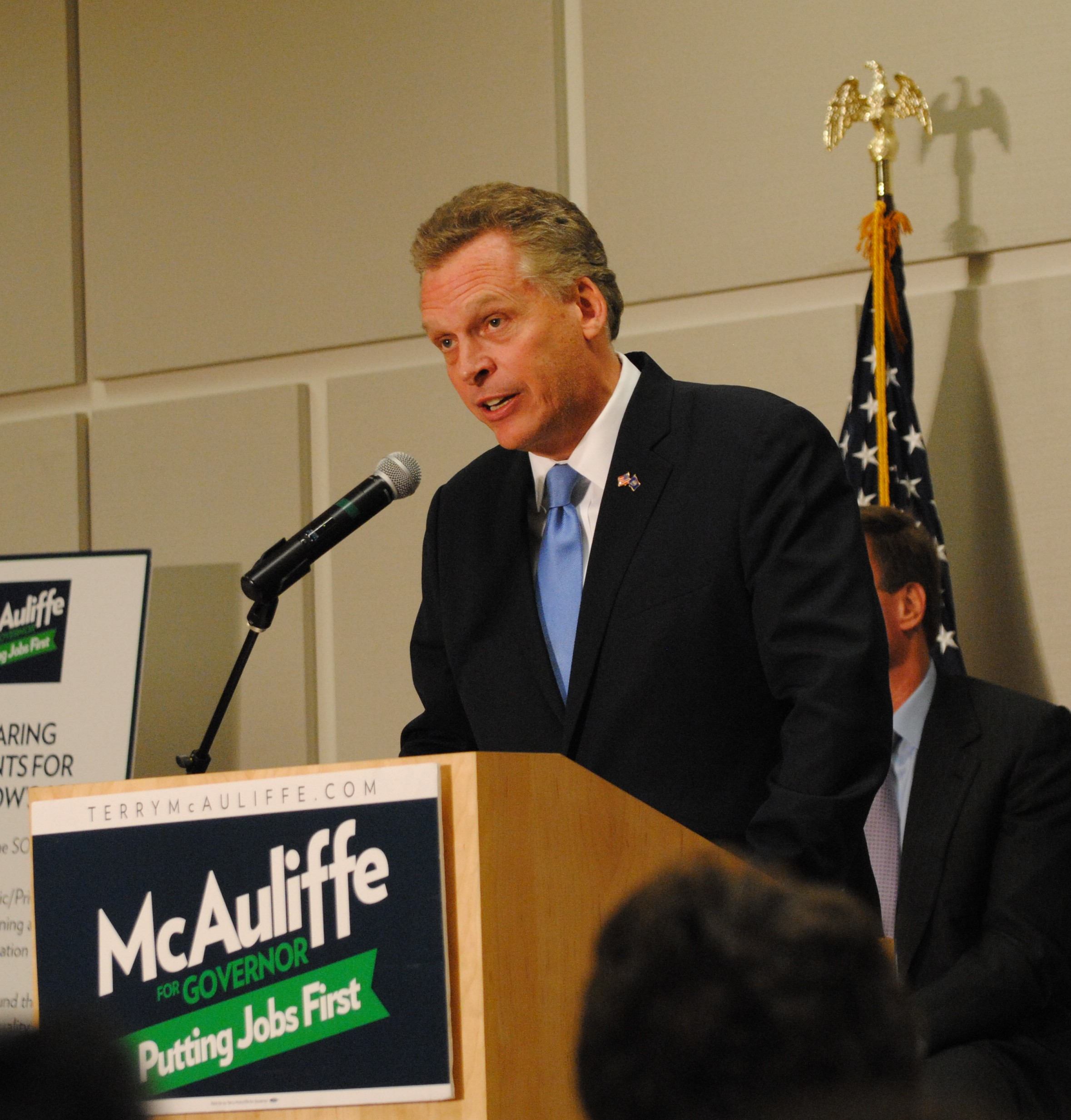
McAuliffe campaigning in May 2013

==== Nominee ====
- Terry McAuliffe, businessman and former chairman of the Democratic National Committee (campaign)

On April 2, 2013, the Democratic Party of Virginia certified that McAuliffe was the only candidate to file for the June primary and therefore the Democratic nominee.

==== Declined ====
- Ward Armstrong, former minority leader of the Virginia House of Delegates
- Tom Perriello, former U.S. representative
- Chap Petersen, state senator
- Mark Warner, U.S. senator and former governor

=== Libertarian Party ===
==== Nominee ====
- Robert Sarvis, lawyer, entrepreneur and software developer

On April 21, 2013, the Libertarian Party of Virginia held a special convention and nominated Sarvis as the party's official gubernatorial candidate.

Sarvis' campaign submitted over 17,000 signatures to meet the Virginia State Board of Elections (SBE) requirement of 10,000 valid signatures. On June 26, 2013, the SBE confirmed to Sarvis' campaign that he would be listed on the ballot statewide during the elections this November. This made Sarvis the fourth minor party gubernatorial nominee to get on the Virginia ballot in 40 years.

=== Write-in candidates ===
==== Declared ====
- John Parmele Jr., Navy retiree

Parmele announced his campaign as a write-in candidate in August 2013. Parmele unsuccessfully ran for the Virginia Beach City Council six times. In 2005, he ran as an independent for the 82nd district of the Virginia House of Delegates and lost to incumbent Harry Purkey.

- Tareq Salahi, reality television personality

Salahi planned to seek the Republican nomination, but left the party to launch an independent bid. However, he failed to submit the necessary signatures to the Virginia State Board of Elections by the June 11, 2013, deadline and did not appear on the ballot as an independent. He transitioned his run into a write-in campaign and said he would pursue a congressional seat if he didn't win the governorship. Salahi also scheduled to have a film made documenting his campaign by Campbell Media Group, but the production company faced legal allegations.

==== Declined ====
- Bill Bolling, lieutenant governor of Virginia

== General election ==
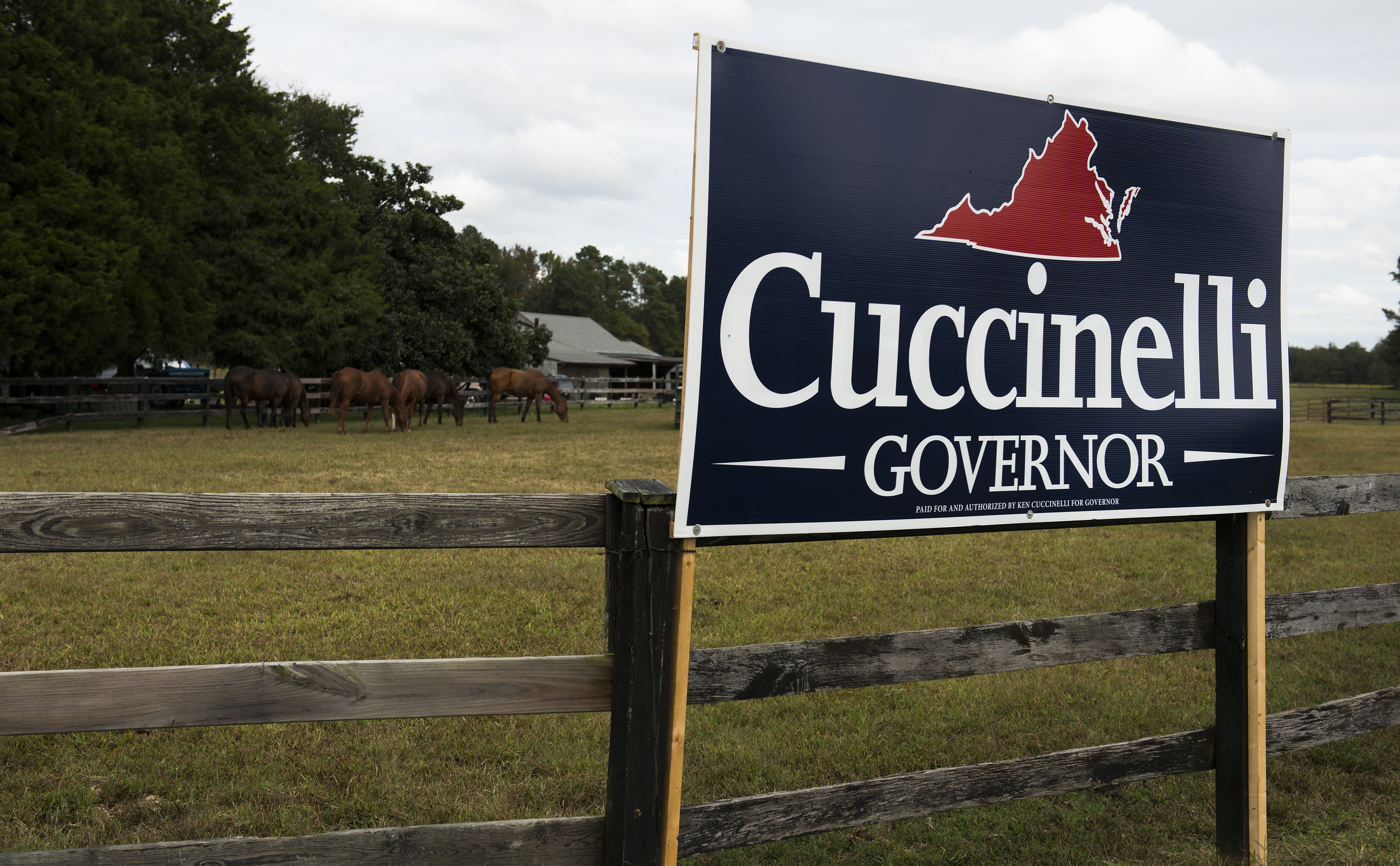
Campaign sign for Cuccinelli

=== Debates and forums ===
Cuccinelli challenged McAuliffe to a series of 15 debates around the state. McAuliffe refused, and called Cuccinelli's challenge "absurd" and a "gimmick". Cuccinelli responded, "McAuliffe's campaign might have dismissed the challenge, but it's clear that community leaders and Virginians share our desire to hold real debates across the Commonwealth."

Both candidates agreed to participate in three debates: July 20, 2013, in Hot Springs, sponsored by the Virginia Bar Association; September 25, 2013, in McLean, sponsored by the Fairfax County Chamber of Commerce and broadcast by NBC affiliates throughout Virginia; and a third debate on October 24, 2013, at Virginia Tech.

Cuccinelli declined to appear at the League of Women Voters/AARP debate, calling it a "left-wing, stacked debate". Cuccinelli accepted a debate invitation in Danville for a date in September or October; McAuliffe did not respond.

Sarvis was not invited to the debates or forums; some newspapers, including the Richmond Times Dispatch, The Roanoke Times, and The Daily Progress, called for his inclusion. Barton Hinkle of the Richmond Times Dispatch called the current debate process "stacked" suggesting that debate organizers are activists trying to influence the outcome of the election for their own ideological purposes. Sarvis said he would "debate anybody anywhere under any conditions."

McAuliffe and his campaign repeatedly declined to give a cost for his spending priorities, stating he would pay for them through unspecified government efficiency improvements, the Medicaid expansion, and federal money from Obamacare. McAuliffe said tax increases would not be on the table to pay for policy proposals. Cuccinelli's 2013 campaign conducted an analysis that found McAuliffe's spending plan would cost at least $14 billion – including $12 billion in new spending – over a four-year term and would translate into a $1,700 tax hike on the average Virginia family. McAuliffe's campaign accused Cuccinelli's campaign of "fabricat[ing]" the numbers.

==== Virginia Bar Association debate ====
Cuccinelli and McAuliffe met in their first debate on Saturday, July 20, 2013, at the Omni Homestead Resort in Hot Springs, Virginia, for the Virginia Bar Association-sponsored debate. Both major party candidates attacked their opponent's record, and they debated one another on issues including transportation, federal healthcare, abortion, Virginia Governor Bob McDonnell, same-sex marriage, and other topics. PBS' Judy Woodruff moderated the debate. Libertarian Sarvis was not invited to join the debate, but he attended the event to greet voters.

==== Virginia Farm Bureau forum ====
Cuccinelli and McAuliffe discussed their plans for Virginia's largest industry, agriculture and forest products, on Friday, August 2, 2013, at Wytheville Community College in Wytheville, Virginia. The candidates also discussed topics including transportation and healthcare. The forum was hosted by the Farm Bureau's Young Farmers Committee. Libertarian Sarvis was not invited.

==== Tidewater Community College forum ====
Cuccinelli and McAuliffe appeared Tuesday, August 6, 2013, at the Norfolk Waterside Marriott in Norfolk, Virginia at an event hosted by Tidewater Community College. Democrat McAuliffe argued that improving transportation would spur job creation, and he wanted to reform the Standards of Learning and Medicaid. Republican Cuccinelli focused on tax cuts as well as expanding opportunities for veterans and growing Virginia's ports. Libertarian Sarvis was not invited to the event, but a spokesman provided a statement about the libertarian candidate.

==== "Battleground Forum" ====
Cuccinelli and McAuliffe took the stage again on August 9, 2013, at the Hylton Performing Arts Center in Manassas, Virginia, hosted by the chambers of commerce from Loudoun, Prince William, Reston and Fredericksburg. Both Cuccinelli and McAuliffe answered a series of questions from representatives from each of the chambers that hosted the forum, and both were called out by the event's moderator for dodging specific questions. The sharpest exchange was between McAuliffe and the forum moderator Derek McGinty, an anchor on WUSA. McAuliffe declined to take a position on the proposed Bi-County Parkway, a controversial project that would cut through Manassas National Battlefield Park to connect Prince William and Loudoun counties. Libertarian Sarvis attended the event but was not included as a candidate, which led some political observers, such as the Franklin Center for Government and Public Integrity's project watchdog.org, to say that the number one thing missing from the forum was the invitation to include Sarvis. Four days after moderating the Battleground Forum, WUSA-TV news anchor Derek McGinty said Sarvis should be part of the conversation.

==== Energy forum in Arlington ====
The Consumer Energy Alliance, the National Ocean Industries Association (NOIA), the Thomas Jefferson Institute for Public Policy, and the Virginia Manufacturers Association co-hosted a forum focused on energy with Cuccinelli and McAuliffe on August 29, 2013. Libertarian Sarvis was not invited to the forum. The event took place at the George Mason University School of Law campus in Arlington. Both Cuccinelli and McAuliffe launched broad attacks on one another. Cuccinelli pointed out McAuliffe's inconsistent stances on coal and offshore drilling (McAuliffe made anti-coal and anti-offshore drilling statements during his 2009 campaign but has attempted to take a more centrist position in 2013). Cuccinelli also pointed to the GreenTech scandal enveloping McAuliffe. McAuliffe offered few specifics on his own energy policy plans but attacked Cuccinelli for his lawsuit of a Virginia Tech professor and expert on global warming whom he investigated for fraud, and said Cuccinelli's views on social issues would drive away businesses.

==== Fairfax County debate ====
The Fairfax County Chamber of Commerce and NBC4 hosted a debate between Cuccinelli and McAuliffe on September 25, 2013. NBC political journalist Chuck Todd moderated. The debate was held at the Capital One Bank headquarters in McLean, Virginia, and was aired live on NBC4 and NBC affiliates in Richmond, Charlottesville, Bristol and other Virginia cities. Throughout the debate, both McAuliffe and Cuccinelli attacked their opponent's records and views. McAuliffe focused on Medicaid expansion, failed to answer a question about the price tag of his education plan, and was exposed for not knowing that a state constitutional amendment is required to reverse the state's constitutional ban on same-sex marriage. Cuccinelli focused on his experience in office, defended his social views, and dodged a question about which loopholes he would close. After the debate, the Fairfax County Chamber of Commerce endorsed McAuliffe.

A spokesman said the debate would exclude Sarvis for "no other reason other than our tradition to provide a forum for the two major-party candidates." Sarvis attended the debate and his campaign debuted a television ad, which aired in Northern Virginia. The Sarvis ad caused Peter Galuszka of The Washington Post to say Sarvis "won" the debate. Five days after the debate moderator Chuck Todd invited Sarvis onto his show, The Daily Rundown, and asked Sarvis questions from the debate.

- Complete video of debate, September 25, 2013 - C-SPAN

==== Virginia Tech debate ====
Virginia Tech and WDBJ sponsored a debate between McAuliffe and Cuccinelli on October 24, 2013.

Prior to the debate, Cuccinelli agreed informally to participate, though his campaign asked questions about the rules, including to raise the threshold for a third-party candidate to participate, before formally agreeing. McAuliffe also agreed to the rules. Originally, the announced threshold for inclusion in the debate was ten percent in the polls. Later, it would be announced the threshold for inclusion in the debate was ten percent according to the RealClearPolitics average by the October 10 invitation deadline. On October 10, Sarvis was polling at 9% in the RealClearPolitics average, and WDBJ announced that Sarvis would not be included at the debate. Sarvis responded that the debate rules were "designed to exclude."

- Complete video of debate, October 24, 2013 - C-SPAN

=== Fundraising ===
Campaign finance reports through November 28, 2013
Candidate	Spent	Votes	Cost per vote
Terry McAuliffe	$38,003,836	1,069,789	$35.52
Ken Cuccinelli	$20,942,496	1,013,354	$20.67
Robert Sarvis	$213,781	146,084	$1.46
Source: Virginia Public Access Project

McAuliffe's funds included $5.7 million from the Democratic Governors Association PAC; $950,000 from the Virginia League of Conservation Voters; over $294,000 he donated to himself; $250,000 from Baltimore Orioles owner Peter Angelos; $120,000 from the Liberian International Ship & Corporate Registry; $100,005 from his father-in-law, Richard Swann; and $100,000 from Bill Clinton. Cuccinelli's funds included $3.97 million from the Republican Governors Association PAC and $500,000 from the Republican Party of Virginia. McAuliffe received 34 contributions of $100,000 or more; Cuccinelli received six contributions of $100,000 or more.

72% of McAuliffe's campaign contributors were from Virginia, but in the first quarter of 2013, 78% of his total funds came from donors from outside Virginia. 33% of Cuccinelli's funds in the first quarter of 2013 came from donors outside Virginia.

Through the first quarter of 2013 ending on March 31, 2013, McAuliffe had raised $6.7 million, and Cuccinelli had raised $4.4 million.

In the second quarter of 2013, McAuliffe raised $2.2 million, Cuccinelli raised $1.1 million, and Sarvis raised approximately $2,500. Terry McAuliffe's top five donors are from outside Virginia. Three of Ken Cuccinelli's top five donors are from out-of-state.

From July 1, 2013, through August 31, 2013, McAuliffe raised $7,355,246; and Cuccinelli raised $5,688,222. Over that period, McAuliffe received 2,010 contributions of more than $100, and 5,476 contributions of $100 or less; while Cuccinelli received 3,193 contributions of more than $100, and 7,075 contributions of $100 or less. During the same period, McAuliffe's biggest donations included the DGA ($2.7 million); the Virginia League of Conservation Voters ($900,000); the American Federation of State, County and Municipal Employees ($100,000); Laborers' International Union of North America Education Fund ($100,000); and the United Food and Commercial Workers Active Ballot Club Education Fund ($100,000). Cuccinelli's biggest donations included several energy companies and private individuals; his largest contribution over the period was $30,000. As of August 31, 2013, McAuliffe's campaign has $5,010,223 cash on hand, and Cuccinelli's campaign has $2,234,369 cash on hand.

==== Spending by outside groups ====
Tom Steyer's PAC NextGen Climate Action, Michael Bloomberg's PAC Independence USA, the National Education Association and the Planned Parenthood Action Fund purchased a combined total of over $4.3 million worth of airtime for television ads supporting McAuliffe or opposing Cuccinelli. Americans for Prosperity, Citizens United, the Virginia Principles Fund PAC, NRA Political Victory Fund, the Ending Spending Fund, and the Fight for Tomorrow PAC purchased a combined total of just over $2 million worth of airtime for television ads supporting Cuccinelli or opposing McAuliffe. Purple PAC, a Libertarian-leaning super PAC, spent over $300,000 in television ads designed to boost the Sarvis campaign before election day.

=== Endorsements ===
Ken Cuccinelli

Elected officials

- Jeb Bush, former governor of Florida
- Tichi Pinkney Eppes, Democratic member of the Richmond School Board
- Bobby Jindal, governor of Louisiana and chairman of the Republican Governors Association
- Bob McDonnell, governor of Virginia and former chairman of the Republican Governors Association
- Rand Paul, U.S. senator of Kentucky
- Ron Paul, former congressman from Texas and 2008 & 2012 presidential candidate
- Mitt Romney, former governor of Massachusetts and nominee for U.S. president in 2012
- Marco Rubio, U.S. senator of Florida
- Rick Santorum, former U.S. senator of Pennsylvania and candidate for U.S. president in 2012
- Scott Walker, governor of Wisconsin

Others

- Mark Levin, talk radio host
- Dave "Mudcat" Saunders, Democratic strategist

Organizations

- Fraternal Order of Police
- National Federation of Independent Business
- Northern Virginia Technology Council
- Susan B. Anthony List
- Virginia Farm Bureau
- Virginia Police Benevolent Association (PBA)

Newspapers

- Bluefield Daily Telegraph
- The Washington Times
Terry McAuliffe

Current and former statewide politicians

- Gerry Connolly, U.S. representative for Virginia's 11th congressional district
- Linwood Holton, former Republican governor of Virginia
- Tim Kaine, U.S. senator and former governor of Virginia
- Bobby Scott, U.S. representative for Virginia's 3rd congressional district
- Mark Warner, U.S. senator and former governor of Virginia
- Douglas Wilder, former governor of Virginia

Current and former state-level politicians

- Vince Callahan, former Republican member of the Virginia House of Delegates 1968–2008
- John Chichester, former Republican member of the Virginia Senate 1978–2008
- Jim Dillard, former Republican member of the Virginia House of Delegates 1980–2005
- Will Sessoms, mayor of Virginia Beach
- Katherine Waddell, independent former delegate, Virginia chair for Republican Majority for Choice

National politicians

- Joe Biden, vice president of the United States
- Anthony Brown, lieutenant governor of Maryland
- Bill Clinton, former president of the United States
- Hillary Clinton, former United States secretary of state, former U.S. senator from New York and former First Lady of the United States
- Barack Obama, president of the United States
- Michelle Obama, First Lady of the United States
- Martin O'Malley, governor of Maryland and former chairman of the Democratic Governors Association

Others

- Boyd Marcus, Republican strategist
- Milt Peterson, principal and chairman of the Peterson Companies
- Dwight Schar, former national finance chair of the Republican National Committee
- Donald Trump, media personality and businessman (Republican)
- Judy Ford Wason, Republican strategist
- Earle Williams, former Republican candidate for governor of Virginia

Organizations

- Fairfax County Chamber of Commerce
- Planned Parenthood Advocates of Virginia
- Virginia Professional Firefighters

Newspapers

- Daily Press
- Falls Church News-Press
- Loudoun Times-Mirror
- The Virginian-Pilot
- The Washington Post
Robert Sarvis

Elected officials

- Gary Johnson, former Republican governor of New Mexico and Libertarian Party nominee for president of the United States in the 2012 election

Others

- Jimmy LaSalvia, co-founder and former executive director of GOProud

Newspapers

- Danville Register & Bee
Declined to endorse

Elected officials

- Bill Bolling, Republican lieutenant governor of Virginia (Republican)

Newspapers

- The Richmond Times-Dispatch
- The Roanoke Times

=== Predictions ===
Source	Ranking	As of
Rothenberg Political Report	Lean D (flip)	October 25, 2013
Sabato's Crystal Ball	Likely D (flip)	October 24, 2013

=== Polling ===
Aggregate polls

Source of poll aggregation	Dates administered	Dates updated	Ken Cuccinelli (R)	Terry McAuliffe (D)	Robert Sarvis (L)	Other/Undecided (Note: Calculated by taking the difference of 100% and all other candidates combined.)	Margin
Real Clear Politics	October 24 – November 3, 2013	November 3, 2013	38.9%	45.6%	9.6%	5.9%	McAuliffe +6.7%

Poll source	Date(s) administered	Sample size	Margin of error	Ken Cuccinelli (R)	Terry McAuliffe (D)	Robert Sarvis (L)	Other	Undecided
Newsmax/Zogby	November 2–4, 2013	600	± 4.1%	31%	43%	12%	4%	11%
Public Policy Polling	November 2–3, 2013	870	± 3.3%	43%	50%	4%	—	3%
Quinnipiac	October 29 – November 3, 2013	1,606	± 2.5%	40%	46%	8%	—	5%
Quinnipiac	October 29 – November 3, 2013	1,606	± 2.5%	42%	49%	—	1%	8%
Newsmax/Zogby	October 30 – November 1, 2013	600	± 4.1%	36%	43%	9%	3%	9%
Emerson College	October 25–30, 2013	874	± 3.24%	40%	42%	13%	—	5%
Christopher Newport University	October 25–30, 2013	1,038	± 3%	38%	45%	10%	—	7%
Rasmussen	October 28–29, 2013	1,002	± 3%	36%	43%	12%	2%	7%
Quinnipiac	October 22–28, 2013	1,182	± 2.9%	41%	45%	9%	1%	4%
Quinnipiac	October 22–28, 2013	1,182	± 2.9%	45%	47%	—	2%	7%
Public Policy Polling	October 26–27, 2013	709 EV	± 3.6%	40%	54%	4%	—	2%
Hampton University	October 24, 26–27, 2013	800	± 2.9%	36%	42%	12%	—	10%
Hampton University	October 24, 26–27, 2013	800	± 2.9%	41%	42%	—	—	17%
Washington Post/Abt SRBI	October 24–27, 2013	762	± 4.5%	39%	51%	8%	—	1%
Washington Post/Abt SRBI	October 24–27, 2013	762	± 4.5%	42%	53%	—	—	5%
Roanoke College	October 21–27, 2013	838	± 3.4%	31%	46%	9%	—	15%
Old Dominion Poll	October 22, 2013	670	± 5%	37%	44%	7%	2%	11%
Quinnipiac	October 15–21, 2013	1,085	± 3%	39%	46%	10%	1%	4%
Quinnipiac	October 15–21, 2013	1,085	± 3%	42%	50%	—	2%	7%
Rasmussen	October 20, 2013	1,000	± 3%	33%	50%	8%	3%	5%
Public Policy Polling	October 19–20, 2013	724 EV	± 3.6%	39%	57%	3%	—	1%
NBC News/Marist	October 13–15, 2013	596	± 4%	38%	46%	9%	1%	7%
NBC News/Marist	October 13–15, 2013	596	± 4%	43%	52%	—	1%	4%
Christopher Newport University	October 8–13, 2013	753	± 3.6%	39%	46%	11%	—	4%
Quinnipiac	October 2–8, 2013	1,180	± 2.9%	39%	47%	8%	—	5%
Quinnipiac	October 2–8, 2013	1,180	± 2.9%	42%	49%	—	1%	7%
PPP/Harper Polling	October 5–6, 2013	1,150	± 2.9%	35%	44%	12%	—	8%
PPP/Harper Polling	October 5–6, 2013	1,150	± 2.9%	42%	52%	—	—	5%
Watson Center	October 1–6, 2013	886	± 3.1%	38%	47%	8%	—	7%
Roanoke College	September 30 – October 5, 2013	1,046	± 3%	34%	40%	9%	—	16%
Emerson College	September 26–30, 2013	519	± 4.25%	38%	43%	11%	—	8%
Newsmax/Zogby	September 27–29, 2013	600	± 4.1%	27%	32%	13%	—	24%
Newsmax/Zogby	September 27–29, 2013	600	± 4.1%	32%	33%	—	11%	24%
Hampton University	September 25–29, 2013	800	± 2.9%	37%	42%	8%	—	12%
University of Mary Washington	September 25–29, 2013	559	± 4.7%	35%	42%	10%	5%	8%
Rasmussen	September 23, 2013	1,050	± 3%	38%	44%	6%	2%	11%
Washington Post/Abt SRBI	September 19–22, 2013	562	± 5%	39%	47%	10%	—	3%
Washington Post/Abt SRBI	September 19–22, 2013	562	± 5%	44%	49%	—	1%	6%
Conquest Communications	September 19, 2013	400	± 5%	35%	36%	11%	—	19%
NBC News/Marist	September 17–19, 2013	546	± 4.2%	38%	43%	8%	—	11%
Harper Polling	September 15–16, 2013	779	± 3.51%	37%	42%	10%	—	11%
Roanoke College	September 9–15, 2013	874	± 3.3%	36%	37%	9%	—	17%
Quinnipiac	September 9–15, 2013	1,005	± 3.1%	41%	44%	7%	1%	6%
Purple Strategies	September 6–10, 2013	800	± 3.5%	38%	43%	—	—	19%
Rasmussen	September 3–4, 2013	998	± 3%	38%	45%	—	7%	10%
Public Policy Polling	August 27–28, 2013	500	± ?	37%	44%	9%	—	9%
Emerson College	August 23–28, 2013	653	± 3.8%	35%	45%	10%	—	11%
Quinnipiac	August 14–19, 2013	1,129	± 2.9%	42%	48%	—	2%	9%
Quinnipiac	July 11–15, 2013	1,030	± 3.1%	39%	43%	—	1%	17%
Public Policy Polling	July 11–14, 2013	601	± 4%	37%	41%	7%	—	15%
Roanoke College	July 8–14, 2013	525	± 4.3%	37%	31%	5%	—	27%
Rasmussen	June 5–6, 2013	1,000	± 3%	41%	44%	—	3%	12%
Public Policy Polling	May 24–26, 2013	672	± 3.8%	37%	42%	—	—	21%
Wenzel Strategies	May 14–15, 2013	800	± 3.4%	44%	36%	—	—	21%
Quinnipiac	May 8–13, 2013	1,286	± 2.7%	38%	43%	—	1%	19%
The Washington Post	April 29 – May 2, 2013	1,000	± 3.5%	46%	41%	—	—	13%
NBC News/Marist	April 28 – May 2, 2013	1,095	± 3%	41%	43%	—	1%	16%
Roanoke College	April 8–14, 2013	639	± 3.9%	34%	29%	—	—	38%
Quinnipiac	March 20–25, 2013	1,098	± 3%	40%	38%	—	2%	20%
University of Mary Washington	March 20–24, 2013	1,004	± 3.5%	37%	38%	—	—	25%
Quinnipiac	February 14–18, 2013	1,112	± 2.9%	38%	38%	—	1%	23%
Roanoke College	January 14–22, 2013	583	± 4.1%	33%	26%	—	—	41%
Christopher Newport University	January 14–20, 2013	1,015	± 3.1%	30%	31%	—	6%	33%
Quinnipiac	January 4–7, 2013	1,134	± 2.9%	39%	40%	—	2%	19%
Public Policy Polling	January 4–6, 2013	602	± 4%	41%	46%	—	—	13%
Quinnipiac	November 8–12, 2012	1,469	± 2.6%	37%	41%	—	1%	22%
Public Policy Polling	August 16–19, 2012	855	± 3.4%	40%	40%	—	—	20%
Public Policy Polling	July 5–8, 2012	647	± 3.9%	37%	41%	—	—	22%
Public Policy Polling	April 26–29, 2012	680	± 3.8%	36%	41%	—	—	23%
Public Policy Polling	December 10–12, 2011	600	± 4%	41%	40%	—	—	20%
Public Policy Polling	July 21–24, 2011	500	± 4.4%	41%	38%	—	—	22%

Hypothetical polling

With Bolling

Poll source	Date(s) administered	Sample size	Margin of error	Bill Bolling (R)	Gerry Connolly (D)	Other	Undecided
Public Policy Polling	December 10–12, 2011	600	± 4%	39%	36%	—	24%

Poll source	Date(s) administered	Sample size	Margin of error	Bill Bolling (R)	Terry McAuliffe (D)	Other	Undecided
Quinnipiac	November 8–12, 2012	1,469	± 2.6%	36%	38%	1%	25%
Public Policy Polling	August 16–19, 2012	855	± 3.4%	40%	37%	—	23%
Public Policy Polling	July 5–8, 2012	647	± 3.9%	36%	33%	—	31%
Public Policy Polling	April 26–29, 2012	680	± 3.8%	36%	34%	—	30%
Public Policy Polling	December 10–12, 2011	600	± 4%	39%	36%	—	25%
Public Policy Polling	July 21–24, 2011	500	± 4.4%	38%	33%	—	29%

Poll source	Date(s) administered	Sample size	Margin of error	Bill Bolling (R)	Tom Perriello (D)	Other	Undecided
Public Policy Polling	August 16–19, 2012	855	± 3.4%	39%	36%	—	25%
Public Policy Polling	July 5–8, 2012	647	± 3.9%	38%	32%	—	30%
Public Policy Polling	April 26–29, 2012	680	± 3.8%	35%	34%	—	31%
Public Policy Polling	December 10–12, 2011	600	± 4%	39%	35%	—	26%
Public Policy Polling	July 21–24, 2011	500	± 4.4%	39%	32%	—	29%

Poll source	Date(s) administered	Sample size	Margin of error	Bill Bolling (R)	Mark Warner (D)	Other	Undecided
Quinnipiac	November 8–12, 2012	1,469	± 2.6%	33%	53%	—	15%
Public Policy Polling	August 16–19, 2012	855	± 3.4%	36%	50%	—	14%
Public Policy Polling	July 5–8, 2012	647	± 3.9%	35%	49%	—	16%
Public Policy Polling	April 26–29, 2012	680	± 3.8%	32%	53%	—	14%

With Cuccinelli

Poll source	Date(s) administered	Sample size	Margin of error	Ken Cuccinelli (R)	Gerry Connolly (D)	Other	Undecided
Public Policy Polling	December 10–12, 2011	600	± 4%	40%	41%	—	20%

Poll source	Date(s) administered	Sample size	Margin of error	Ken Cuccinelli (R)	Tom Perriello (D)	Other	Undecided
Public Policy Polling	August 16–19, 2012	855	± 3.4%	39%	41%	—	20%
Public Policy Polling	July 5–8, 2012	647	± 3.9%	39%	38%	—	23%
Public Policy Polling	April 26–29, 2012	680	± 3.8%	36%	39%	—	25%
Public Policy Polling	December 10–12, 2011	600	± 4%	41%	41%	—	19%
Public Policy Polling	July 21–24, 2011	500	± 4.4%	41%	36%	—	23%

Poll source	Date(s) administered	Sample size	Margin of error	Ken Cuccinelli (R)	Mark Warner (D)	Other	Undecided
Quinnipiac	November 8–12, 2012	1,469	± 2.6%	34%	52%	—	15%
Public Policy Polling	August 16–19, 2012	855	± 3.4%	36%	53%	—	11%
Public Policy Polling	July 5–8, 2012	647	± 3.9%	37%	51%	—	13%
Public Policy Polling	April 26–29, 2012	680	± 3.8%	33%	53%	—	14%

Three-way race

Poll source	Date(s) administered	Sample size	Margin of error	Ken Cuccinelli (R)	Terry McAuliffe (D)	Bill Bolling (I)	Other	Undecided
Public Policy Polling	November 2–3, 2013	870	± 3.3%	32%	34%	22%	—	13%
Quinnipiac	February 14–18, 2013	1,112	± 2.9%	31%	34%	13%	—	22%
Roanoke College	January 14–22, 2013	583	± 4.1%	25%	19%	12%	—	44%
Christopher Newport University	January 14–20, 2013	1,015	± 3.1%	27%	27%	9%	—	37%
Quinnipiac	January 4–7, 2013	1,134	± 2.9%	34%	34%	13%	—	19%
Public Policy Polling	January 4–6, 2013	602	± 4%	32%	40%	15%	—	13%

=== Results ===
Polls indicated that McAuliffe would win comfortably on Election Day. However, the race was much closer than expected. Cuccinelli led for a good portion of the evening. However, Fairfax County, a suburb of Washington D.C., is heavily Democratic, and is often one of the last parts of the state to count their votes. With around 90% of the vote McAuliffe took the lead for the first time. McAuliffe's lead continued to grow as Fairfax County came in. With 96% of the vote counted, CNN called the race for McAuliffe. At 10:06 P.M. EST, Cuccinelli called McAuliffe to concede defeat. Ralph Northam, also a Democrat, won the race for lieutenant governor, making the governor and the lieutenant governor both Democrats for the first time since 2006.

2013 Virginia gubernatorial election
Party	Candidate	Votes	%	±%
Democratic	Terry McAuliffe	1,069,789	47.74%	+6.49%
Republican	Ken Cuccinelli	1,013,354	45.22%	−13.39%
Libertarian	Robert Sarvis	146,084	6.52%	N/A
Write-in		11,844	0.53%	+0.41%
Total votes		2,241,071	100.00%	N/A
Democratic gain from Republican				

==== By county and independent city ====
Locality	Ken Cuccinelli Republican		Terry McAuliffe Democratic		Various candidates Other parties		Margin		Totals
Locality	#	%	#	%	#	%	#	%	Totals
Accomack	4,879	53.70%	3,806	41.89%	401	4.41%	−1,073	−11.81%	9,086
Albemarle	12,408	35.36%	19,039	54.26%	3,641	10.38%	6,631	18.90%	35,088
Alexandria	9,405	22.82%	29,584	71.77%	2,229	5.41%	20,179	48.96%	41,218
Alleghany	1,993	48.19%	1,628	39.36%	515	12.45%	−365	−8.82%	4,136
Amelia	2,613	61.38%	1,338	31.43%	306	7.19%	−1,275	−29.95%	4,257
Amherst	5,466	60.47%	2,993	33.11%	580	6.42%	−2,473	−27.36%	9,039
Appomattox	3,475	68.35%	1,241	24.41%	368	7.24%	−2,234	−43.94%	5,084
Arlington	14,978	22.18%	48,346	71.58%	4,215	6.24%	33,368	49.41%	67,539
Augusta	13,817	67.70%	5,100	24.99%	1,492	7.31%	−8,717	−42.71%	20,409
Bath	686	56.55%	392	32.32%	135	11.13%	−294	−24.24%	1,213
Bedford	17,330	69.26%	5,802	23.19%	1,888	7.55%	−11,528	−46.08%	25,020
Bland	1,300	70.31%	388	20.98%	161	8.71%	−912	−49.32%	1,849
Botetourt	7,366	65.11%	2,924	25.85%	1,023	9.04%	−4,442	−39.26%	11,313
Bristol	2,536	63.46%	1,305	32.66%	155	3.88%	−1,231	−30.81%	3,996
Brunswick	1,618	35.77%	2,704	59.78%	201	4.44%	1,086	24.01%	4,523
Buchanan	3,275	67.54%	1,461	30.13%	113	2.33%	−1,814	−37.41%	4,849
Buckingham	2,053	49.32%	1,804	43.33%	306	7.35%	−249	−5.98%	4,163
Buena Vista	721	57.91%	422	33.90%	102	8.19%	−299	−24.02%	1,245
Campbell	11,133	70.16%	3,712	23.39%	1,022	6.44%	−7,421	−46.77%	15,867
Caroline	3,380	43.42%	3,794	48.73%	611	7.85%	414	5.32%	7,785
Carroll	5,061	64.24%	2,182	27.70%	635	8.06%	−2,879	−36.54%	7,878
Charles City	828	32.57%	1,558	61.29%	156	6.14%	730	28.72%	2,542
Charlotte	2,104	56.38%	1,358	36.39%	270	7.23%	−746	−19.99%	3,732
Charlottesville	1,922	15.37%	9,440	75.47%	1,146	9.16%	7,518	60.11%	12,508
Chesapeake	28,855	45.60%	30,838	48.73%	3,584	5.66%	1,983	3.13%	63,277
Chesterfield	51,114	48.68%	42,865	40.83%	11,013	10.49%	−8,249	−7.86%	104,992
Clarke	2,596	52.90%	2,002	40.80%	309	6.30%	−594	−12.11%	4,907
Colonial Heights	3,319	65.59%	1,131	22.35%	610	12.06%	−2,188	−43.24%	5,060
Covington	513	40.24%	590	46.27%	172	13.49%	77	6.04%	1,275
Craig	1,063	65.13%	396	24.26%	173	10.60%	−667	−40.87%	1,632
Culpeper	7,272	60.90%	3,923	32.86%	745	6.24%	−3,349	−28.05%	11,940
Cumberland	1,456	50.07%	1,190	40.92%	262	9.01%	−266	−9.15%	2,908
Danville	4,824	44.52%	5,389	49.73%	623	5.75%	565	5.21%	10,836
Dickenson	2,125	61.90%	1,184	34.49%	124	3.61%	−941	−27.41%	3,433
Dinwiddie	3,507	47.02%	3,380	45.32%	571	7.66%	−127	−1.70%	7,458
Emporia	569	34.38%	987	59.64%	99	5.98%	418	25.26%	1,655
Essex	1,487	47.74%	1,381	44.33%	247	7.93%	−106	−3.40%	3,115
Fairfax City	2,777	38.59%	3,987	55.41%	432	6.00%	1,210	16.81%	7,196
Fairfax County	110,681	36.12%	178,746	58.33%	17,003	5.55%	68,065	22.21%	306,430
Falls Church	1,142	23.11%	3,523	71.29%	277	5.61%	2,381	48.18%	4,942
Fauquier	12,565	59.86%	7,376	35.14%	1,051	5.01%	−5,189	−24.72%	20,992
Floyd	2,636	57.55%	1,488	32.49%	456	9.96%	−1,148	−25.07%	4,580
Fluvanna	3,774	47.71%	3,348	42.33%	788	9.96%	−426	−5.39%	7,910
Franklin City	833	36.17%	1,362	59.14%	108	4.69%	529	22.97%	2,303
Franklin County	10,011	61.33%	4,756	29.14%	1,557	9.54%	−5,255	−32.19%	16,324
Frederick	13,148	63.81%	6,339	30.76%	1,118	5.43%	−6,809	−33.05%	20,605
Fredericksburg	2,154	35.47%	3,488	57.44%	430	7.08%	1,334	21.97%	6,072
Galax	728	56.65%	455	35.41%	102	7.94%	−273	−21.25%	1,285
Giles	2,944	58.92%	1,541	30.84%	512	10.25%	−1,403	−28.08%	4,997
Gloucester	6,688	59.69%	3,633	32.43%	883	7.88%	−3,055	−27.27%	11,204
Goochland	5,155	56.04%	3,077	33.45%	966	10.50%	−2,078	−22.59%	9,198
Grayson	3,094	63.75%	1,400	28.85%	359	7.40%	−1,694	−34.91%	4,853
Greene	3,069	57.34%	1,719	32.12%	564	10.54%	−1,350	−25.22%	5,352
Greensville	1,012	35.26%	1,724	60.07%	134	4.67%	712	24.81%	2,870
Halifax	5,432	54.20%	3,909	39.00%	681	6.80%	−1,523	−15.20%	10,022
Hampton	10,384	28.09%	24,631	66.62%	1,956	5.29%	14,247	38.54%	36,971
Hanover	23,415	60.32%	10,862	27.98%	4,543	11.70%	−12,553	−32.34%	38,820
Harrisonburg	3,236	40.26%	4,190	52.13%	611	7.60%	954	11.87%	8,037
Henrico	39,400	38.00%	53,132	51.24%	11,157	10.76%	13,732	13.24%	103,689
Henry	8,024	59.29%	4,558	33.68%	951	7.03%	−3,466	−25.61%	13,533
Highland	557	61.68%	279	30.90%	67	7.42%	−278	−30.79%	903
Hopewell	2,446	45.05%	2,499	46.03%	484	8.92%	53	0.98%	5,429
Isle of Wight	6,547	53.83%	4,843	39.82%	772	6.35%	−1,704	−14.01%	12,162
James City	13,756	51.11%	11,344	42.15%	1,816	6.75%	−2,412	−8.96%	26,916
King and Queen	1,051	47.84%	968	44.06%	178	8.10%	−83	−3.78%	2,197
King George	3,985	59.76%	2,289	34.33%	394	5.91%	−1,696	−25.43%	6,668
King William	2,976	56.82%	1,671	31.90%	591	11.28%	−1,305	−24.91%	5,238
Lancaster	2,367	52.17%	1,786	39.37%	384	8.46%	−581	−12.81%	4,537
Lee	3,507	73.12%	1,180	24.60%	109	2.27%	−2,327	−48.52%	4,796
Lexington	499	32.85%	936	61.62%	84	5.53%	437	28.77%	1,519
Loudoun	40,464	45.19%	44,369	49.55%	4,707	5.26%	3,905	4.36%	89,540
Louisa	5,381	54.06%	3,546	35.63%	1,026	10.31%	−1,835	−18.44%	9,953
Lunenburg	1,705	50.94%	1,397	41.74%	245	7.32%	−308	−9.20%	3,347
Lynchburg	10,632	53.56%	7,923	39.91%	1,297	6.53%	−2,709	−13.65%	19,852
Madison	2,510	55.51%	1,575	34.83%	437	9.66%	−935	−20.68%	4,522
Manassas	3,828	46.45%	4,013	48.70%	400	4.85%	185	2.24%	8,241
Manassas Park	888	41.77%	1,142	53.72%	96	4.52%	254	11.95%	2,126
Martinsville	1,411	41.60%	1,723	50.80%	258	7.61%	312	9.20%	3,392
Mathews	2,044	58.62%	1,194	34.24%	249	7.14%	−850	−24.38%	3,487
Mecklenburg	4,226	55.94%	3,038	40.22%	290	3.84%	−1,188	−15.73%	7,554
Middlesex	2,131	54.39%	1,375	35.09%	412	10.52%	−756	−19.30%	3,918
Montgomery	10,133	43.40%	10,689	45.78%	2,527	10.82%	556	2.38%	23,349
Nelson	2,314	43.10%	2,523	46.99%	532	9.91%	209	3.89%	5,369
New Kent	4,365	59.62%	2,120	28.96%	836	11.42%	−2,245	−30.67%	7,321
Newport News	14,803	34.90%	25,085	59.14%	2,531	5.97%	10,282	24.24%	42,419
Norfolk	11,654	25.19%	31,708	68.54%	2,898	6.26%	20,054	43.35%	46,260
Northampton	1,589	40.23%	2,048	51.85%	313	7.92%	459	11.62%	3,950
Northumberland	2,823	53.97%	1,961	37.49%	447	8.55%	−862	−16.48%	5,231
Norton	482	55.34%	346	39.72%	43	4.94%	−136	−15.61%	871
Nottoway	1,899	47.46%	1,756	43.89%	346	8.65%	−143	−3.57%	4,001
Orange	5,561	55.64%	3,629	36.31%	805	8.05%	−1,932	−19.33%	9,995
Page	3,754	61.65%	2,001	32.86%	334	5.49%	−1,753	−28.79%	6,089
Patrick	3,553	69.34%	1,373	26.80%	198	3.86%	−2,180	−42.54%	5,124
Petersburg	798	9.61%	7,260	87.47%	242	2.92%	6,462	77.86%	8,300
Pittsylvania	11,682	63.99%	5,419	29.69%	1,154	6.32%	−6,263	−34.31%	18,255
Poquoson	2,987	67.66%	1,040	23.56%	388	8.79%	−1,947	−44.10%	4,415
Portsmouth	6,776	26.11%	17,671	68.09%	1,506	5.80%	10,895	41.98%	25,953
Powhatan	6,748	66.18%	2,327	22.82%	1,122	11.00%	−4,421	−43.36%	10,197
Prince Edward	2,252	42.19%	2,674	50.09%	412	7.72%	422	7.91%	5,338
Prince George	5,011	53.79%	3,580	38.43%	725	7.78%	−1,431	−15.36%	9,316
Prince William	42,431	43.69%	50,441	51.94%	4,244	4.37%	8,010	8.25%	97,116
Pulaski	4,720	58.55%	2,581	32.01%	761	9.44%	−2,139	−26.53%	8,062
Radford	1,254	42.89%	1,364	46.65%	306	10.47%	110	3.76%	2,924
Rappahannock	1,499	51.34%	1,290	44.18%	131	4.49%	−209	−7.16%	2,920
Richmond City	9,854	16.83%	42,957	73.39%	5,722	9.78%	33,103	56.55%	58,533
Richmond County	1,295	56.28%	836	36.33%	170	7.39%	−459	−19.95%	2,301
Roanoke City	7,786	35.75%	11,714	53.78%	2,281	10.47%	3,928	18.03%	21,781
Roanoke County	18,040	58.24%	9,844	31.78%	3,089	9.97%	−8,196	−26.46%	30,973
Rockbridge	3,640	53.87%	2,431	36.18%	649	9.66%	−1,189	−17.69%	6,720
Rockingham	14,968	67.64%	5,725	25.87%	1,435	6.48%	−9,243	−41.77%	22,128
Russell	3,920	64.78%	1,914	31.63%	217	3.59%	−2,006	−33.15%	6,051
Salem	4,019	56.01%	2,324	32.39%	833	11.61%	−1,695	−23.62%	7,176
Scott	4,001	75.59%	1,158	21.88%	134	2.53%	−2,843	−53.71%	5,293
Shenandoah	7,345	63.30%	3,565	30.72%	693	5.97%	−3,780	−32.58%	11,603
Smyth	4,880	64.79%	2,307	30.63%	345	4.58%	−2,573	−34.16%	7,532
Southampton	2,578	50.26%	2,295	44.75%	256	4.99%	−283	−5.52%	5,129
Spotsylvania	17,755	55.96%	12,220	38.51%	1,755	5.53%	−5,535	−17.44%	31,730
Stafford	18,595	54.50%	13,657	40.03%	1,869	5.48%	−4,938	−14.47%	34,121
Staunton	2,869	44.33%	3,058	47.25%	545	8.42%	189	2.92%	6,472
Suffolk	9,906	40.87%	13,132	54.17%	1,202	4.96%	3,226	13.31%	24,240
Surry	977	36.48%	1,576	58.85%	125	4.67%	599	22.37%	2,678
Sussex	1,259	38.79%	1,834	56.50%	153	4.71%	575	17.71%	3,246
Tazewell	7,490	73.90%	2,358	23.27%	287	2.83%	−5,132	−50.64%	10,135
Virginia Beach	51,494	47.57%	49,357	45.59%	7,402	6.84%	−2,137	−1.97%	108,253
Warren	5,873	60.53%	3,392	34.96%	437	4.50%	−2,481	−25.57%	9,702
Washington	9,989	68.96%	3,936	27.17%	560	3.87%	−6,053	−41.79%	14,485
Waynesboro	2,598	51.90%	1,918	38.31%	490	9.79%	−680	−13.58%	5,006
Westmoreland	2,116	47.39%	2,115	47.37%	234	5.24%	−1	−0.02%	4,465
Williamsburg	1,337	30.64%	2,748	62.97%	279	6.39%	1,411	32.33%	4,364
Winchester	2,702	47.54%	2,631	46.29%	351	6.18%	−71	−1.25%	5,684
Wise	5,830	70.04%	2,196	26.38%	298	3.58%	−3,634	−43.66%	8,324
Wythe	4,967	64.41%	2,049	26.57%	696	9.02%	−2,918	−37.84%	7,712
York	11,923	56.43%	7,745	36.66%	1,461	6.91%	−4,178	−19.77%	21,129
Totals	1,013,354	45.22%	1,069,789	47.74%	157,928	7.05%	56,435	2.52%	2,241,071

Counties and independent cities that flipped from Democratic to Republican

- Alleghany (largest city: Clifton Forge)
- Bath (largest city: Hot Springs)

Counties and independent cities that flipped from Republican to Democratic

- Albemarle (largest municipality: Scottsville)
- Brunswick (largest borough: Lawrenceville)
- Caroline (largest borough: Bowling Green)
- Chesapeake (independent city)
- Danville (independent city)
- Emporia (independent city)
- Fairfax (independent city)
- Fairfax (largest municipality: Herndon)
- Harrisonburg (independent city)
- Henrico (largest borough: Richmond)
- Hopewell (independent city)
- Loudoun (largest borough: Leesburg)
- Manassas (independent city)
- Manassas Park (independent city)
- Montgomery (largest city: Blacksburg)
- Nelson (largest municipality: Nellysford)
- Northampton (largest borough: Exmore)
- Prince Edward (largest municipality: Farmville)
- Prince William (largest borough: Manassas)
- Radford (independent city)
- Staunton (independent city)
- Suffolk (independent city)
- Sussex (largest borough: Waverly)

==== By congressional district ====
Despite losing the state, Cuccinelli won seven of 11 congressional districts, while McAuliffe won four, including one held by a Republican.

District	Cuccinelli	McAuliffe	Representative
1st	52.36%	41.56%	Rob Wittman
2nd	46.16%	47.13%	Scott Rigell
3rd	19.09%	75.45%	Bobby Scott
4th	48.07%	45.29%	Randy Forbes
5th	51.43%	41.3%	Robert Hurt
6th	57.82%	35.02%	Bob Goodlatte
7th	51.81%	38.24%	Eric Cantor
8th	26.64%	68.13%	Jim Moran
9th	61.11%	32.23%	Morgan Griffith
10th	47.88%	46.96%	Frank Wolf
11th	34.75%	60.28%	Gerry Connolly

== Analysis ==
The election's result was somewhat surprising, because many polls showed McAuliffe with a larger margin of victory over Cuccinelli than he ended up with. The Libertarian candidate was seen as having a large impact on the polls, his presence complicating them and adding "uncertainty to the ballot test". The polling for the lieutenant governor and attorney general elections, which did not feature a third-party candidate, was much more accurate. Although Sarvis also under-performed, this is the best result for a third-party candidate in Virginia since 1965. This is the first time since 1885 that a party was voted out of the governor's mansion after just one term.

== See also ==
- List of governors of Virginia
- 2013 United States gubernatorial elections
- 2013 Virginia elections
- 2013 Virginia lieutenant gubernatorial election
- 2013 Virginia Attorney General election
- 2013 Terry McAuliffe gubernatorial campaign
