= Libby Garvey =

Virginian politician

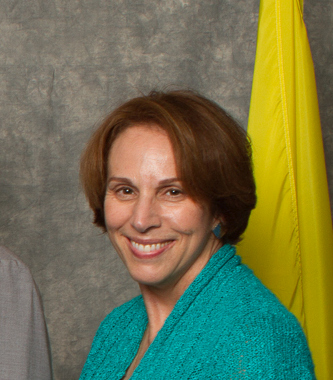

Member of the Arlington County Board
- In office March 2012 – December 2024
- Preceded by: Barbara Favola
- Succeeded by: JD Spain, Sr.

Personal details
- Party: Democratic
- Spouse: Kennan Garvey (1973-2008)
- Education: Mount Holyoke College
- Profession: Politician
- Website: libbygarvey.com

Libby Garvey is an American politician who served as a member of the Arlington County Board from 2012 to 2024. She has previously served as the board's chair.

== Career ==
Garvey attended Mount Holyoke College in South Hadley, Massachusetts, where she earned a bachelor's degree. Her professional career began as a teacher in the Central African Republic with the Peace Corps.

In 1999 Garvey was elected to the Arlington County's Board of Education and served for 15 (non-consecutive) years. During that time, she served as chairwoman five times. Robert G. Smith, who served as the Board's most senior administrator for most of her tenure, described a key exchange they had when he was being interviewed for the job of supervisor. He said they discussed the common attitude that those students coming from an impoverished family background, were predetermined to have low academic performance. In a book Smith wrote, describing how he turned around the County's student's academic performance, he described Garvey challenging him to disprove the common misconception.

In 2011, she ran an unsuccessful bid for a seat in the Virginia State Senate.

=== Arlington County Board and the Columbia Pike Streetcar ===
Garvey was first elected to the Arlington County Board in March 2012 and was reelected in November 2016. She later served in parent-teacher associations of Abingdon and Dew elementary schools and the H-B Woodlawn program. She has been vice president of the County Council of PTAs, vice president of the Fairlington Civic Association and vice chairwoman of the Advisory Council on Instruction. Democratic Gov. Mark Warner appointed Garvey to serve on the Education Council, an appointment that was later continued by Democratic Gov. Tim Kaine.

The Columbia Pike Streetcar was a plan to build a 5 miles (8.0 km) streetcar through Columbia Pike, connecting Pentagon City in Arlington County, to Skyline Plaza in Fairfax County. As cost estimates skyrocketed, the plan became controversial.

In a firehouse caucus, Garvey won the Democratic nomination for the Arlington County Board seat. Since Arlington is considered a heavily Democratic county, it was widely expected that the winner of the caucus would prevail in the general election. Garvey wanted to see a cost analysis of the program before supporting or opposing the streetcar, while her main opponent was an enthusiastic supporter. Garvey's win was attributed to voters who sought an independent voice on the County Board.

When Garvey announced her opposition to the streetcar, she found herself at odds with local Democratic party members who supported the plan. In 2014 tension grew to anger when she endorsed and helped raise campaign funds for John Vihstadt, who sought an open seat on the Arlington County Board. Vihstadt, a Republican ran as an independent in a special election to replace board member Chris Zimmerman, who retired from the board in January. Garvey defended her support of Vihstadt because he shared her views on the streetcar. Garvey said that she felt her responsibility to the voters who elected her outweighed her obligations to local party politics. Arlington County Democratic Committee Chairman Kip Malinosky, said he received numerous complaints of Garvey's public support of Vihstadt who defeated Democrat Alan Howse in the special election. As a result, in April 2014, Garvey was forced from the party's leadership committee, but has since returned.

The special election only guaranteed Vihstadt a seat on the board until the end of the year, when Zimmerman's term was to have ended. In November 2014, Vihstadt and Howse would once again faced off for the open seat. Garvey, now political allies with Vihstadt continued to support his efforts to win a full four-year term. The election was viewed by many as a referendum on the streetcar. Vihstadt was able to use the streetcar and tap into growing voter resentment over what he called "vanity projects" such as an aquatics center, an over-budget dog park and an infamous "million dollar bus stop and won the election handily. Board members Jay Fisette and Mary Hynes, both strong supporters of the streetcar, realized they could not persuade the majority of voters to support the project. The project was officially halted on November 18. The acrimony of the cancellation was apparent immediately after the vote when Fisette refused to shake hands with Garvey. The simmering tensions over the project was highly unusual because of Arlington's commitment to both courtesy and consensus.

In June 2016 Garvey easily defeated challenger Erik Gutshall in a local Democratic Party Primary which was a rare challenge to unseat an incumbent's bid to win reelection

Voters rejected efforts by the Democratic establishment to punish Garvey for her support of Republican-turned-independent John Vihstadt, whose election in 2014 ended 15 years of an all-Democratic board.

— Patricia Sullivan, Washington Post

Garvey's alienation of the "fading Democratic Establishment" led to what one veteran election-watch described as an "unprecedented onslaught" consisting of "a coalition of current and former elected officials and Democratic activists" who were angered and sought to unseat her for supporting Vhidstat and for displaying an independent streak.

== Personal life ==
Garvey has lived in Arlington since 1977. She has two daughters, both of whom are graduates of Arlington County Public Schools, and five grandchildren. She established the Kennan Garvey Memorial Fund for Phoenix Bikes in memory of her late husband, and has served on their board.
