= Mary Margaret Whipple =

American politician (born 1940)

Honorable Mary Margaret Whipple

Member of the Virginia Senate from the 31st district
- In office January 1996 – January 10, 2012
- Preceded by: Edward M. Holland
- Succeeded by: Barbara Favola

Member of the Arlington County Board
- In office November 1983 – December 1995
- Preceded by: Stephen H. Detwiler
- Succeeded by: Christopher Zimmerman

Personal details
- Born: May 26, 1940 (age 86) Watseka, Illinois
- Party: Democratic
- Spouse: Thomas
- Education: Rice University; American University; George Washington University
- Profession: Educator
- Committees: Rules (chair); Agriculture, Conservation and Natural Resources; Education and Health; Finance; Privileges and Elections

Mary Margaret Whipple (born May 26, 1940) is a former Democratic member of the Senate of Virginia, representing the 31st district from 1996 - 2012.

== Political career ==
She was the Chairman of the Senate Democratic Caucus, and she was the first woman to hold a leadership position in the Virginia General Assembly. On February 25, 2011, Whipple announced that she will not be seeking reelection. Whipple also serves as a member of the Eighth District Democratic Committee and the State Democratic Committee.

Perhaps Whipple's most notable achievement in the 2007 legislative session was inserting renewable energy portfolio requirements in legislation applicable to Virginia electric utilities. Her committee assignments in the 2010-11 legislative sessions were: Agriculture, Conservation and Natural Resources; Education and Health; Finance; Privileges and Elections; and Rules. Whipple believes Virginia's tax system is "grossly regressive" and has sponsored bills to change it. Her bills would share state income tax revenues with localities and would increase the cigarette tax to 60 cents per pack. In 2001–02, Whipple served on the Commission on the Structure of Virginia's State and Local Tax System and Service Responsibilities.

In December 2009, while serving in the Senate of Virginia of the Virginia General Assembly Whipple wrote the Governor Tim Kaine, requesting a conditional pardon and clemency for Joseph Giarratano.

Whipple was raised in College Station, Texas and attended Rice University. She holds a B.A. in English from American University and an M.A. in American Studies from George Washington University. She was appointed to the Arlington School Board in 1976 and served as chair in 1978–79. Whipple was elected to the Arlington County Board in 1983–95, and was chair in 1986. While on the County Board, she served as the Arlington representative to the Washington Metropolitan Area Transit Authority ("Metro") Board in 1985 and in 1988–1995, serving as chair in 1990.

Among the possible successors in the 31st Senate District were Delegates Patrick Hope and Robert Brink, former Lieutenant Governor candidate Mike Signer, County Board member Barbara Favola, and lawyer Jaime Areizaga. Barbara Favola eventually won the seat.

Senate of Virginia
| Preceded by Edward M. Holland | Virginia Senate, District 31; 1996–2012 | Succeeded by Barbara Favola |
