= Russet Perry =

American politician from Virginia

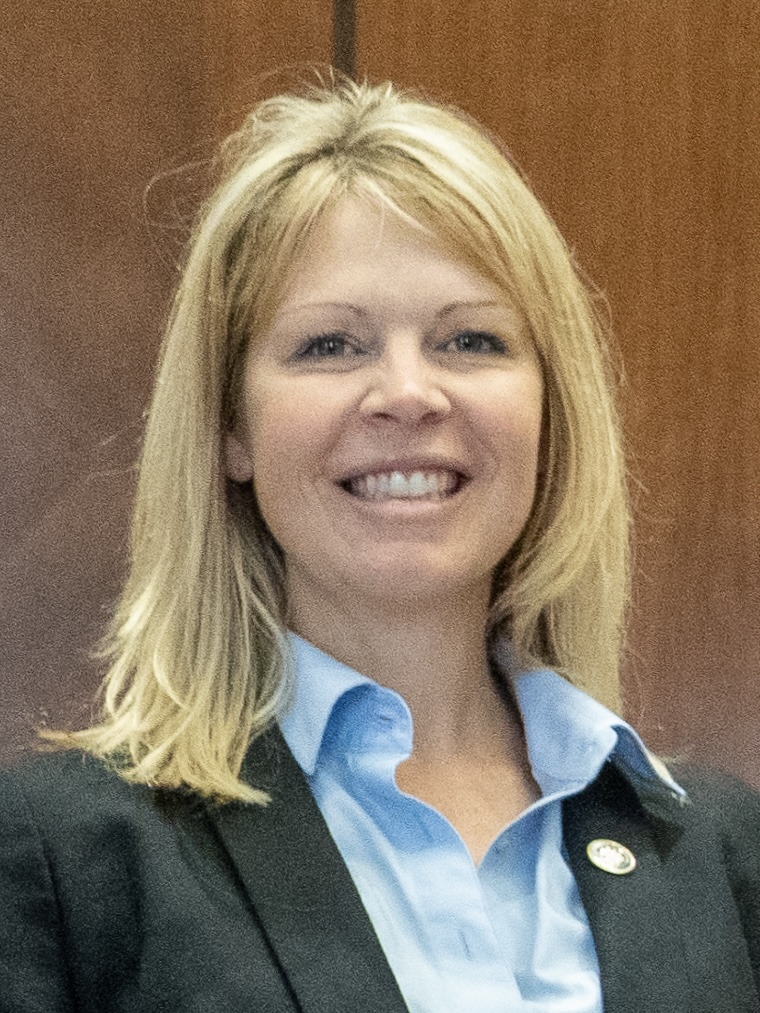

Member of the Virginia Senate from the 31st district
- Incumbent
- Assumed office January 10, 2024
- Preceded by: Jill Vogel

Personal details
- Party: Democratic
- Occupation: prosecutor

Russet Perry is an American Democratic politician from Virginia. She was elected to the Virginia Senate in the 2023 Virginia Senate election from the 31st district.

== Early life and career ==
Perry moved to Loudoun County, Virginia in 2006, and resided in Round Hill. Perry was a prosecutor in the Loudoun County government until 2021. Perry also worked for the Central Intelligence Agency.

== Political career ==
In 2023, Perry ran for the Virginia Senate, in the newly redrawn 31st district. Perry defeated Leesburg Town Council member Zach Cummings by a 63%–37% margin, to win the Democratic Party nomination.

In the general election, Perry faced businessman Juan Pablo Segura. Elections analysts Mark Rozell and Chaz Nuttycombe described the race as a potential "majority maker" in the closely divided state senate. The general election was one of the most expensive state legislative races in Virginia history, with each candidate's campaign raising over $5 million.

Perry won the race by a 53%–47% margin, resulting in the Democratic Party retaining control of the Virginia Senate.
