= Northern Virginia Chamber of Commerce =

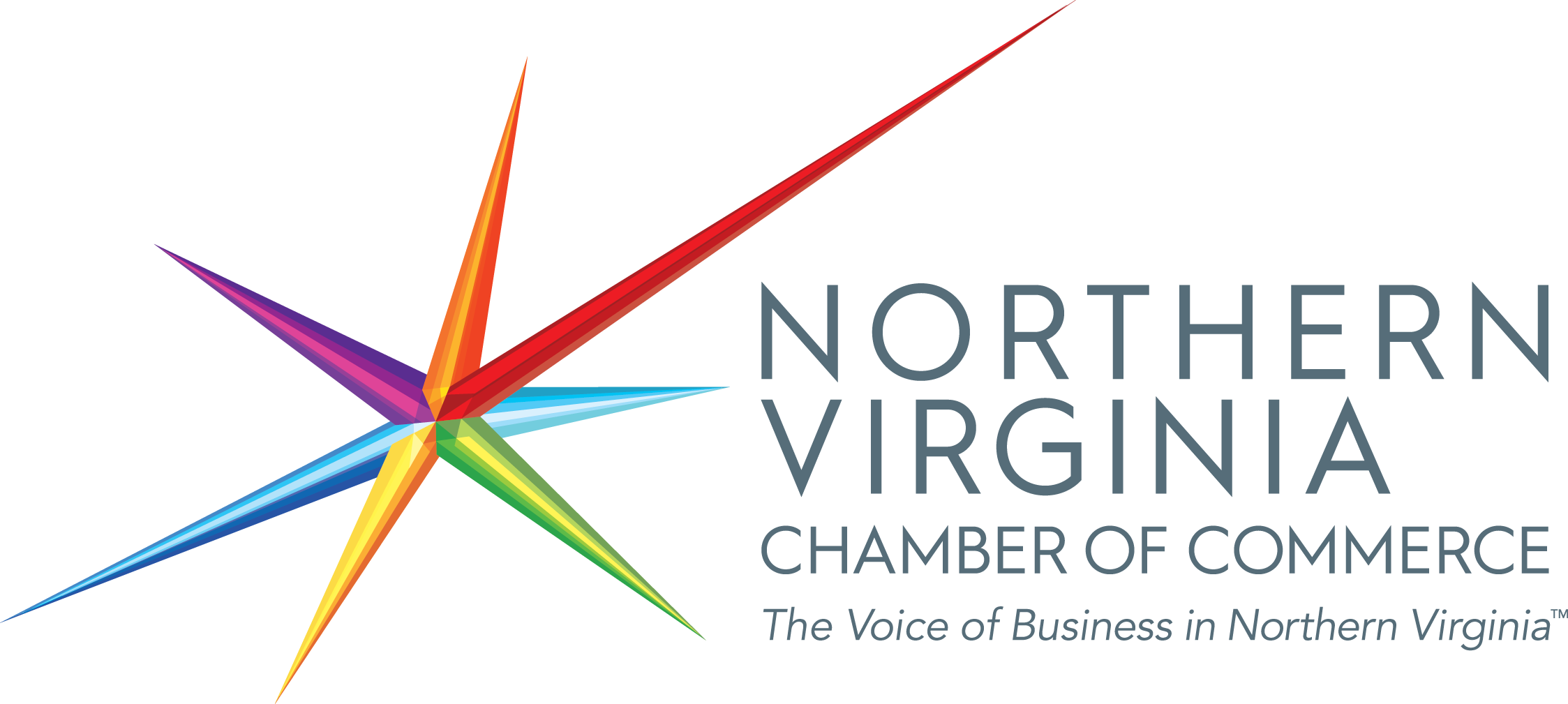
- Founded: Fairfax County Chamber of Commerce: 1925; 101 years ago Northern Virginia Chamber of Commerce: January 2016; 10 years ago
- Type: Chamber of Commerce
- Purpose: Business advocacy
- Location: Fairfax County, Virginia
- Region served: Northern Virginia
- Method: Business networking Media attention Programming; Political lobbying
- Key people: Julie Coons, President and CEO
- Website: www.novachamber.org

The Northern Virginia Chamber of Commerce (NVC) is a membership based business network located in Fairfax County, Virginia. It represents 650+ businesses and 500,000 employees, making it the largest regional chamber of commerce in Virginia.

The chamber provides the Northern Virginia business community with access to opportunities represented by the Chamber’s four foundational pillars: business development, thought leadership, strategic advocacy, and community partnerships.

In January 2016, the organization restructured itself from the Fairfax County Chamber of Commerce to the Northern Virginia Chamber of Commerce. In August 2018, the Chamber announced that Better Business Bureau Chief Operating Officer, Julie Coons, would be the organization's new President and CEO following a nation-wide search.

In June 2023, Deborah "Deb" Gandy became the first Black woman to be inducted as chair of the chamber, after succeeding Matt McQueen.

== Mission statement ==
The Northern Virginia Chamber offers business development opportunities to organizations interested in growth through knowledge, access and influence in Northern Virginia, the Commonwealth of Virginia, and the Metropolitan Washington Region. The Chamber leads the business community by: engaging in thought leadership; strengthening industry knowledge; advocating for business positions; and supporting key partnerships.

Home of the Fairfax County Chamber of Commerce

== Board of directors ==
- Julie Coons, President and CEO
- Todd Rowley, Chair
- Kathryn Falk, Vice Chair
- Luanne Gutermuth, Secretary
- Susan Moser, Treasurer
- Scott Hommer, General Counsel
- Jennifer Siciliano, Immediate Past Chair
