= 2013 United States gubernatorial elections =

- November 5, 2013

2 governorships
	Majority party	Minority party
Party	Republican	Democratic
Seats before	30	20
Seats after	29	21
Seat change	▼1	▲1
Popular vote	2,292,286	1,879,767
Percentage	52.53%	43.08%
Seats up	2	0
Seats won	1	1
- Map of the results Democratic gain Republican hold No election

United States gubernatorial elections were held on November 5, 2013 in New Jersey and Virginia. These elections formed part of the 2013 United States elections. Before the elections, both seats were held by Republicans. Republican incumbent Chris Christie won reelection in New Jersey, while in Virginia, Democrat Terry McAuliffe won the open seat held by term-limited Republican Bob McDonnell. Both states were up for election that Barack Obama won in the 2012 presidential election.

This was the first time since 1985 that Virginia and New Jersey elected governors of different parties. As of 2026, this is the last time that a Republican won the governorship in New Jersey.

== Election predictions ==
Several sites and individuals publish predictions of competitive seats. These predictions look at factors such as the strength of the incumbent (if the incumbent is running for re-election), the strength of the candidates, and the partisan leanings of the state (reflected in part by the state's Cook Partisan Voting Index rating). The predictions assign ratings to each state, with the rating indicating the predicted advantage that a party has in winning that seat.

Most election predictors use:

- "tossup": no advantage
- "tilt" (used by some predictors): advantage that is not quite as strong as "lean"
- "lean": slight advantage
- "likely": significant, but surmountable, advantage
- "safe" or "solid": near-certain chance of victory

State	PVI	Incumbent	Last race	IE Oct 25, 2013	Sabato Oct 24, 2013	Result
New Jersey	D+6	Chris Christie	48.46% R	Solid R	Safe R	Christie; 60.30% R
Virginia	EVEN	Bob McDonnell (term-limited)	58.61% R	Lean D (flip)	Likely D (flip)	McAuliffe; 47.75% D (flip)

== Race summary ==
State	Incumbent	Party	First elected	Result	Candidates
New Jersey	Chris Christie	Republican	2009	Incumbent re-elected.	▌ ✓ Chris Christie (Republican) 60.3%; ▌Barbara Buono (Democratic) 38.2%
Virginia	Bob McDonnell	Republican	2009	Incumbent term-limited. New governor elected. Democratic gain.	▌ ✓ Terry McAuliffe (Democratic) 47.8%; ▌Ken Cuccinelli (Republican) 45.2%; ▌Robert Sarvis (Libertarian) 6.5%

== Closest races ==
States where the margin of victory was under 5%:

1. Virginia, 2.6%

Blue denotes states won by Democrats.

== New Jersey ==
2013 New Jersey gubernatorial election
- November 5, 2013
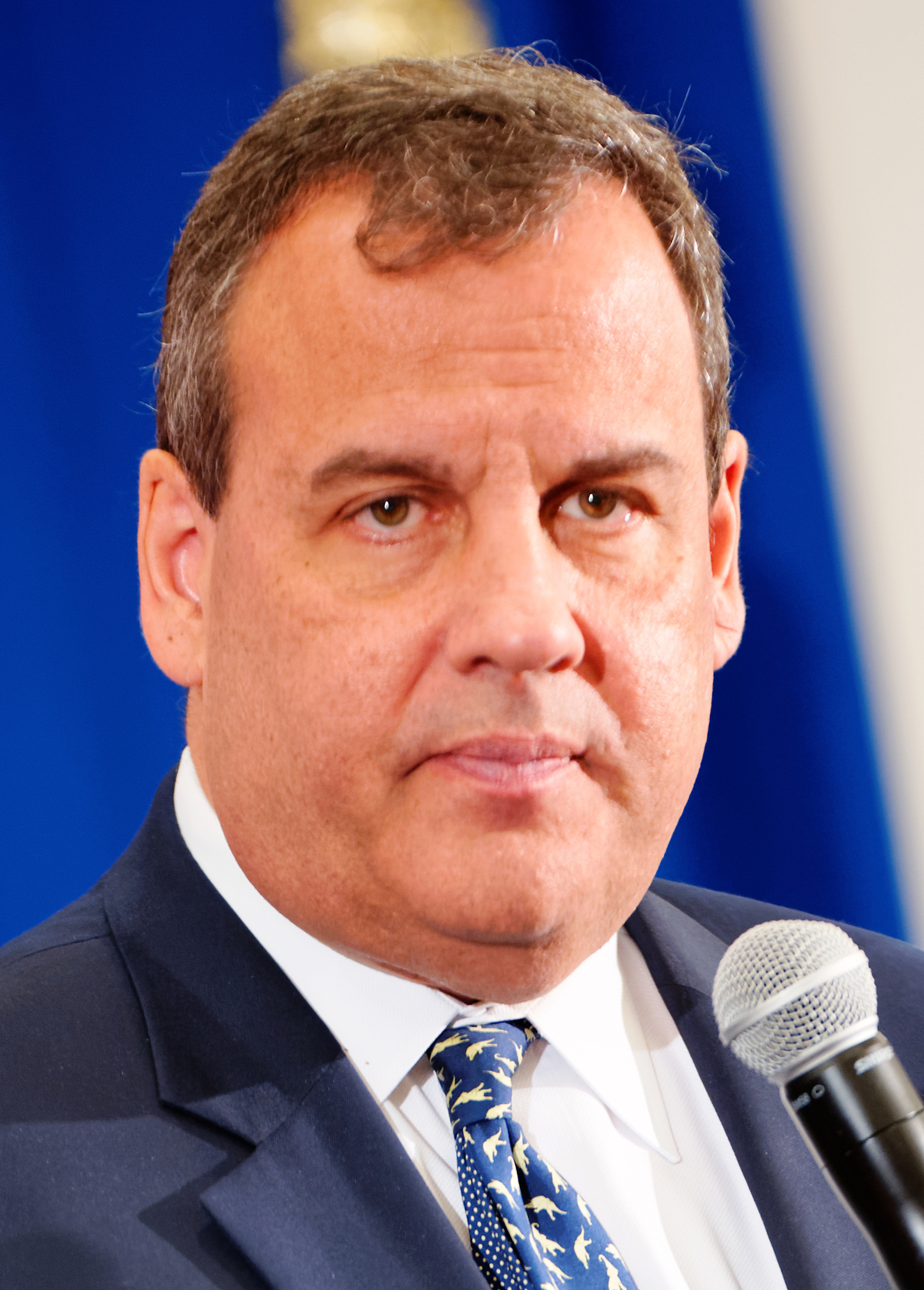

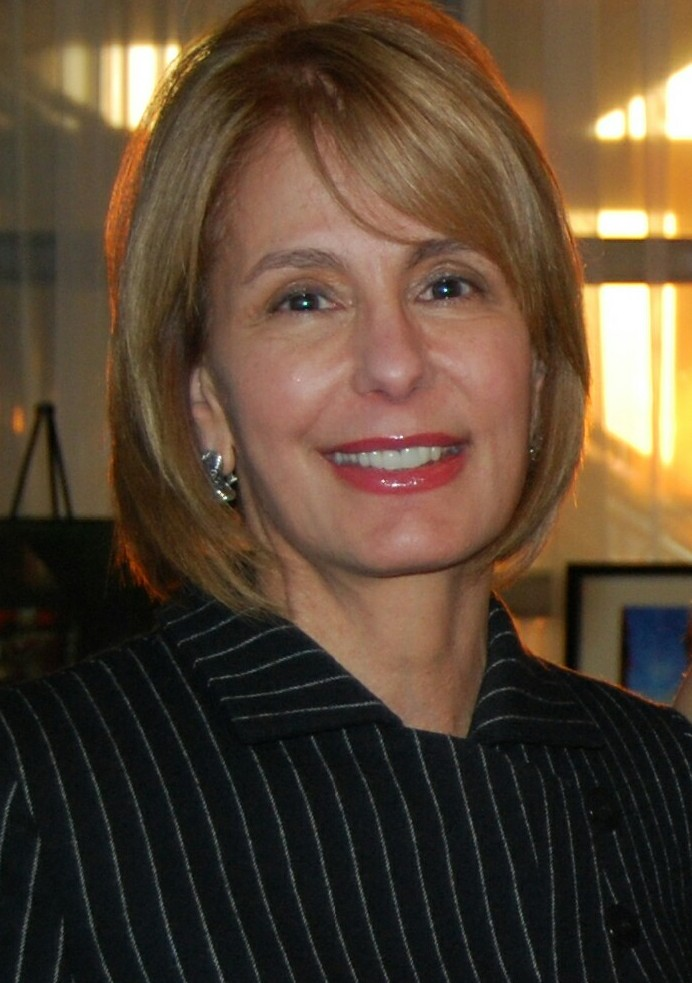
Nominee	Chris Christie	Barbara Buono
Party	Republican	Democratic
Popular vote	1,278,932	809,978
Percentage	60.3%	38.2%
- County results
Governor before election
Chris Christie
Republican
Elected Governor
Chris Christie
Republican

Governor Chris Christie ran for a second term. Christie's re-election campaign could be the prelude to a 2016 presidential campaign for him.

Christie's approval ratings have hovered at or above 50% consistently throughout 2012, and broke records as the highest approval rating of any New Jersey governor in a recent Fairleigh Dickinson poll.

State Senator and former State Senate Democratic Leader Barbara Buono was the Democratic nominee.

The Libertarian nominee was Ken Kaplan, who also ran for U.S. Senator in 2012.

Chris Christie cruised to victory on November 5, 2013 when he won in a landslide victory against his adversary, Barbara Buono. Christie won 60.4% of the vote compared to 38.1% of the vote Buono earned. Exit polls also showed that Christie appealed to ethnic minorities, an increasing priority for Republicans.

New Jersey general election
Party	Candidate	Votes	%
Republican	Chris Christie (incumbent)	1,278,932	60.30
Democratic	Barbara Buono	809,978	38.19
Libertarian	Kenneth R. Kaplan	12,155	0.57
Green	Steve Welzer	8,295	0.39
Independent	Diane W. Sare	3,360	0.16
Peace and Freedom	William Araujo	3,300	0.16
Independent	Hank Schroeder	2,784	0.13
Independent	Jeff Boss	2,062	0.10
Total votes		2,120,866	100.00
Republican hold			

== Virginia ==
2013 Virginia gubernatorial election
- November 5, 2013
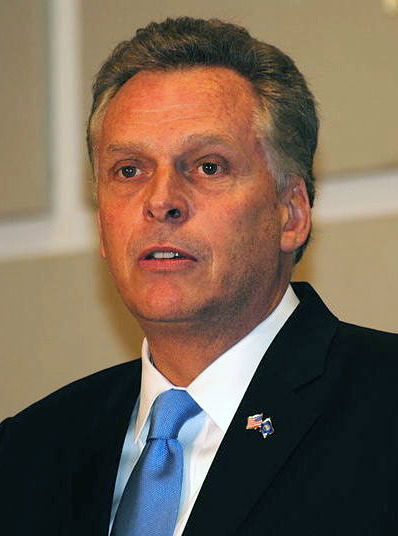

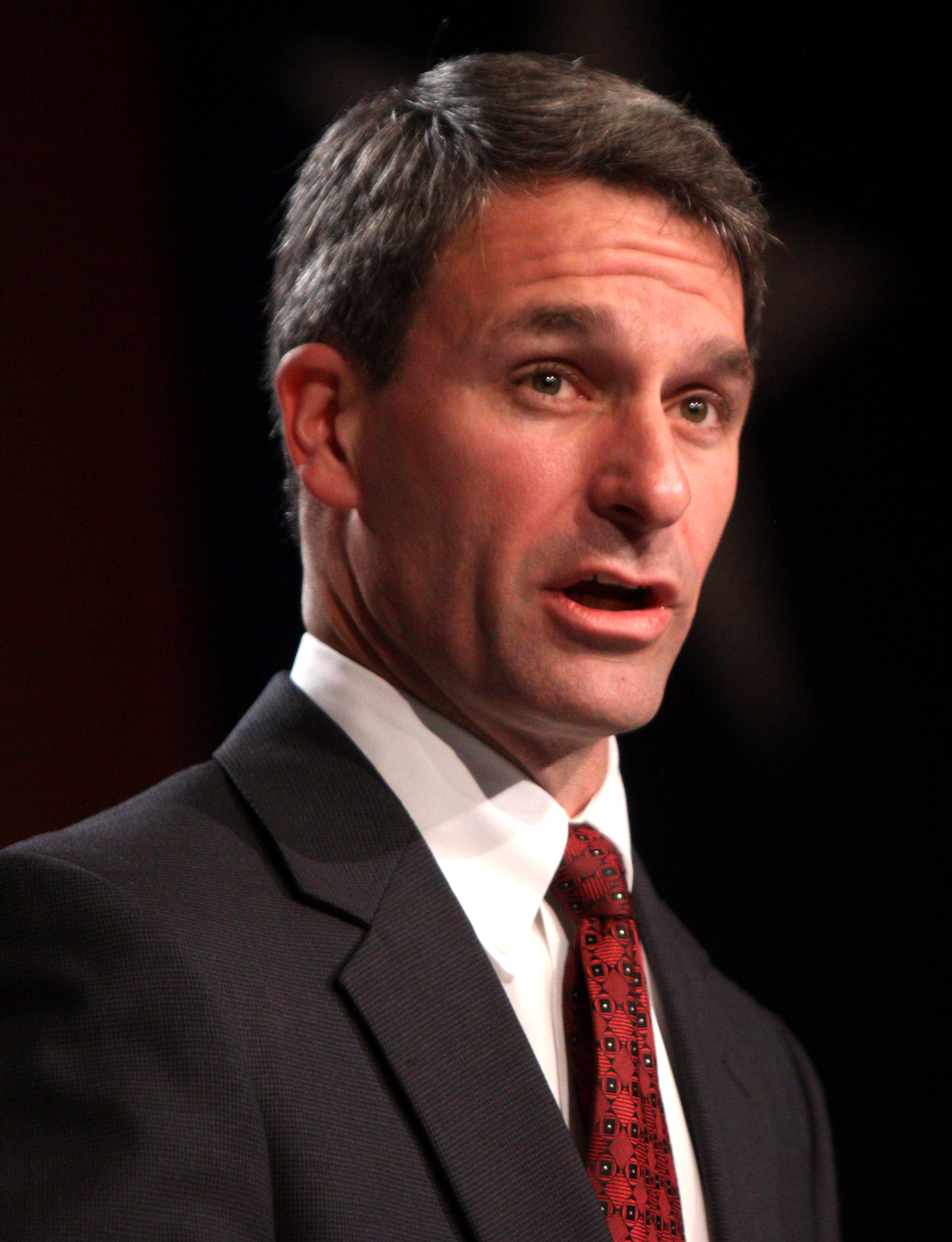

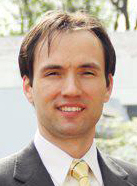
Nominee	Terry McAuliffe	Ken Cuccinelli	Robert Sarvis
Party	Democratic	Republican	Libertarian
Popular vote	1,069,789	1,013,354	146,084
Percentage	47.8%	45.2%	6.5%
- County and independent city results
Governor before election
Bob McDonnell
Republican
Elected Governor
Terry McAuliffe
Democratic

Governor Bob McDonnell was term-limited in 2013, as Governors of Virginia cannot serve consecutive terms.

Attorney General Ken Cuccinelli was the Republican nominee for Governor, after winning the nomination at Virginia's 2013 Republican Party convention.

Terry McAuliffe, former chairman of the Democratic National Committee, was the Democratic nominee for Governor, after being the only candidate to file for the race.

Robert Sarvis, an entrepreneur and lawyer, was the Libertarian Party nominee. On June 26, 2013, the Virginia State Board of Elections confirmed to Sarvis's campaign that he would be listed on the ballot statewide during the elections this November.

On November 5, 2013, Terry McAuliffe narrowly beat Ken Cuccinelli by a margin of 48% to 45.5% with Robert Sarvis accounting for the other 6.6% of the vote.

Virginia general election
Party	Candidate	Votes	%
Democratic	Terry McAuliffe	1,069,789	47.75
Republican	Ken Cuccinelli	1,013,354	45.23
Libertarian	Robert Sarvis	146,084	6.52
Write-in		11,087	0.49
Total votes		2,240,314	100.00
Democratic gain from Republican			
