= 1949 United States gubernatorial elections =

- November 8, 1949

2 governorships
	Majority party	Minority party
Party	Democratic	Republican
Seats before	29	19 (Note: Arthur G. Crane (R) succeeded Wyoming Governor Lester C. Hunt (D), who took a seat in the U.S. Senate in January 1949.)
Seats after	29	19
Seat change	Steady	Steady
Seats up	1	1
Seats won	1	1
- Democratic hold Republican hold

The 1949 United States gubernatorial elections were held on November 8, 1949, in two states. In New Jersey, the governor was elected to a 4-year term for the first time, instead of a 3-year term.

== Race summary ==
=== Results ===
State	Incumbent	Party	First elected	Result	Candidates
New Jersey	Alfred E. Driscoll	Republican	1946	Incumbent re-elected.	✓ Alfred E. Driscoll (Republican) 51.54%; Elmer H. Wene (Democratic) 47.13%; James Imbrie (Progressive) 0.63%; John C. Butterworth (Socialist Labor) 0.38%; Edson R. Leach (Prohibition) 0.32%
Virginia	William M. Tuck	Democratic	1945	Incumbent term-limited. New governor elected. Democratic hold.	✓ John S. Battle (Democratic) 70.43%; Walter Johnson (Republican) 27.44%; Clarke T. Robb (Social Democrat) 2.12%
