= List of elections in 1945 =

The following elections occurred in the year 1945.

== Africa ==
- 1945 South-West African legislative election
- 1945 Liberian constitutional referendum

== Asia ==
- 1945 Egyptian parliamentary election
- 1945 Indian general election

== Australia ==
- 1945 Blacktown state by-election
- 1945 Fremantle by-election
- 1945 Manly state by-election
- 1945 Neutral Bay state by-election
- 1945 Prahran state by-election
- 1945 Ryde state by-election
- 1945 Victorian state election
- 1945 Victoria Park state by-election

== Europe ==
- 1945 Albanian parliamentary election
- 1945 Bulgarian parliamentary election
- 1945 Danish Folketing election
- 1945 San Marino general elections
- 1945 Faroese general election
- 1945 Finnish parliamentary election
- 1945 Hungarian parliamentary election
- 1945 Icelandic presidential election
- 1945 Irish local elections
- 1945 Irish presidential election
- 1945 Liechtenstein local elections
- 1945 Luxembourg general election
- 1945 Norwegian parliamentary election
- 1945 Norwegian local elections
- 1945 Portuguese legislative election
- 1945 Swiss referendums
- 1945 Yugoslavian parliamentary election

=== Austria ===
- 1945 Austrian legislative election
- elections ('Landtagswahl') in all States of Austria:
  - in Burgenland
  - in Kärnten (Carinthia)
  - in Niederösterreich (Lower Austria
  - in Oberösterreich (Upper Austria)
  - in Salzburg (Salzburg (state)
  - in der Steiermark (Styria)
  - in Tirol (Tyrol)
  - in Vorarlberg (Vorarlberg)
  - in Vienna

=== France ===
- 1945 French constitutional referendum
- 1945 French legislative election

=== Liechtenstein ===
- 1945 Liechtenstein general election
- 1945 Liechtenstein local elections

=== United Kingdom ===
- 1945 United Kingdom general election
  - England: 1945 United Kingdom general election in England
  - Scotland: 1945 United Kingdom general election in Scotland
  - Wales: 1945 United Kingdom general election in Wales
  - Northern Ireland: 1945 United Kingdom general election in Northern Ireland
  - List of MPs elected in the 1945 United Kingdom general election
- 1945 Ashton-under-Lyne by-election
- 1945 Caernarvon Boroughs by-election
- 1945 Chelmsford by-election
- 1945 Combined Scottish Universities by-election
- 1945 Edinburgh East by-election
- 1945 Kensington South by-election
- 1945 Middlesbrough West by-election
- 1945 Monmouth by-election
- 1945 Motherwell by-election
- 1945 Neath by-election
- 1945 Newport by-election
- 1945 Northern Ireland general election
- 1945 Smethwick by-election
- 1945 Tottenham North by-election

==== United Kingdom local ====
- 1945 Manchester Council election

===== English local =====
- 1945 Bermondsey Borough election
- 1945 Southwark Borough election

== North America ==
- 1945 Panamanian Constitutional Assembly election
- 1945 Panamanian presidential election

=== Canada ===
- 1945 Canadian federal election
- 1945 British Columbia general election
- 1945 Edmonton municipal election
- 1945 Manitoba general election
- 1945 Nova Scotia general election
- 1945 Ontario general election
- 1945 Toronto municipal election

=== United States ===
==== United States lieutenant gubernatorial ====
- 1945 Virginia lieutenant gubernatorial election

==== United States gubernatorial ====
- 1945 United States gubernatorial elections
- 1945 Virginia gubernatorial election

==== United States House of Representatives ====
- 1945 United States House of Representatives elections

==== United States mayoral elections ====
- 1945 Boston mayoral election
- 1945 Cleveland mayoral election
- 1945 Detroit mayoral election
- 1945 Hartford mayoral election
- 1945 Los Angeles mayoral election
- 1945 Manchester, New Hampshire, mayoral election
- 1945 New York City mayoral election
- 1945 Pittsburgh mayoral election
- 1945 Springfield mayoral election

== Oceania ==
=== Australia ===
- 1945 Fremantle by-election
- 1945 Victorian state election

== South America ==
- 1945 Brazilian legislative election
- 1945 Brazilian presidential election
- 1945 Chilean parliamentary election
- 1945 Colombian parliamentary election
- 1945 Peruvian general election
- 1945 Salvadoran presidential election

== See also ==
- Category:1945 elections
