= 1945 United States gubernatorial elections =

- November 6, 1945

1 governorship
	Majority party	Minority party
Party	Democratic	Republican
Seats before	25	23
Seats after	25	23
Seat change	Steady	Steady
Seats up	1	0
Seats won	1	0
- Democratic hold

United States gubernatorial elections were held in 1945, in the state of Virginia. Virginia holds its gubernatorial elections in odd numbered years, every 4 years, following the United States presidential election year.

== Race summary ==
=== Results ===
State	Incumbent	Party	First elected	Result	Candidates
Virginia	Colgate Darden	Democratic	1941	Incumbent term-limited. New governor elected. Democratic hold.	✓ William M. Tuck (Democratic) 66.58%; S. Floyd Landreth (Republican) 31.04%; Howard Carwile (Independent) 2.38%
