= 1949 Virginia gubernatorial election =

- November 8, 1949
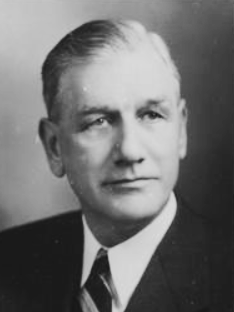

| Nominee | John S. Battle | Walter Johnson |
| Party | Democratic | Republican |
| Popular vote | 184,772 | 71,991 |
| Percentage | 70.43% | 27.44% |
- County and independent city results Battle: 40–50% 50–60% 60–70% 70–80% 80–90% >90% Johnson: 40–50% 50–60%
Governor before election
William M. Tuck
Democratic
Elected Governor
John S. Battle
Democratic

In the 1949 Virginia gubernatorial election, incumbent Governor William M. Tuck, a Democrat, was unable to seek re-election due to term limits. State Senator John S. Battle was nominated by the Democratic Party to run against Republican Walter Johnson.

== Background ==
For the previous five decades Virginia had almost completely disenfranchised its black and poor white populations through the use of a cumulative poll tax and literacy tests. So restricted was suffrage in this period that it has been calculated that a third of Virginia's electorate during the first half of the twentieth century comprised state employees and officeholders. This limited electorate allowed Virginian politics to be controlled for four decades by the Byrd Organization, as progressive "antiorganization" factions were rendered impotent by the inability of almost all their potential electorate to vote.

Historical fusion with the “Readjuster” Democrats, defection of substantial proportions of the Northeast-aligned white electorate of the Shenandoah Valley and Southwest Virginia over free silver, and an early move towards a "lily white" Jim Crow party meant Republicans retained a small but permanent number of legislative seats and local offices in the western part of the state. Nevertheless, in gubernatorial elections during this period the Republican vote was mostly in the nature of a protest, and in most elections between 1925 and 1949 turnout was higher in the Democratic primary than the general election.

=== Organization divided ===
For the only time in its forty-year reign, the Byrd machine would suffer a significant division over whom to nominate. After Tuck was established in the governor's mansion, it was expected that Richmond mayor Horace Hall Edwards would be next in line, but as early as 1947, organization leaders had begun to feel that Edwards was too unreliable. By 1948, Byrd was urging Edwards to wait until the next gubernatorial election, but Edwards refused to withdraw. The organization urged Edwards to wait given its respect for elders, and ultimately chose as its nominee John S. Battle, a long-serving state senator.

The primary was further complicated by the entry of wealthy Petersburg pen manufacturer Remmie Arnold, who had risen from a poor background to running the second-largest pen company in the world. Unlike Byrd, Arnold explicitly endorsed Dixiecrat Strom Thurmond for president the previous year, (Note: As in North Carolina, Tennessee and Oklahoma, the relative viability of Republican opposition in Virginia prevented most local Democrats, regardless of opposition to civil rights programs, endorsing Thurmond because of the possibility that a division of the Democrats would place the Republicans in control of the state.) and he consequently drew support from disenchanted Dixiecrats, arguing that

the power to tax is the power to destroy

During the campaign Arnold would claim that the Byrd Organization attempted to "bury" him by a nomination as Lieutenant Governor or Senator. It was rumoured at one point that Arnold could withdraw, but he never intended to and maintained his campaign even without any expectation of winning.

=== Antiorganization threat ===
The split in the Byrd Organization meant that antiorganization candidates, normally weak and lacking leaders, gained a rare opportunity. Francis Pickens Miller, a former legislator from Fairfax County, had long been critical of how 1937 Democratic nominee James Price had his program undermined by Byrd's allies. Miller had been highly aggressive in urging Democrats to support Harry S. Truman the previous year and already announced he would run at the time of the presidential election. He soon argued that the party "high command" had completely lost touch with rank and file Democrats.

Although no polls were taken, the campaign in the primary maintained a high pace right up until polling day on August 2.

=== Primary campaign ===
Miller campaigned extremely vigorously against the Byrd machine, with his speeches being frequently described as "evangelical".

Early in the primary campaign the focus was generally on the issue of improving funding for Virginia's uniformly poor public schools. At this time, Edwards was the frontrunner, but his advocacy of a two percent sales tax completely opposed the political norms of Virginia in this era. In the last month of the campaign, however, Byrd and his candidate Battle would step up their campaigning with what one historian has called a "blitzkrieg". Byrd would throw the weight of organization resources behind Battle during the summer, with his focus turning to Miller's support for labor unions, which Virginia's almost entirely upper class electorate viewed with extreme suspicion after the postwar strike wave across the country.

== Democratic nomination ==
=== Candidates ===
- Remmie Leroy Arnold, Petersburg businessman
- John S. Battle, State Senator
- Horace Hall Edwards, mayor of Richmond
- Francis Pickens Miller, former State Delegate from Fairfax County

==== Primary results by county and independent city ====
1949 Virginia gubernatorial Democratic primary by county or independent city
| | John Stewart Battle Democratic | | Francis Pickens Miller Democratic | | Horace Hall Edwards Democratic | | Remmie Leroy Arnold Democratic | | Margin | | Total votes cast |
| | # | % | # | % | # | % | # | % | # | % | Total votes cast |
|---|---|---|---|---|---|---|---|---|---|---|---|
| Accomack County | 1,828 | 56.51% | 769 | 23.77% | 342 | 10.57% | 296 | 9.15% | 1,059 | 32.74% | 3,235 |
| Albemarle County | 1,676 | 70.10% | 542 | 22.67% | 123 | 5.14% | 50 | 2.09% | 1,134 | 47.43% | 2,391 |
| Alleghany County | 867 | 30.59% | 1,499 | 52.89% | 158 | 5.58% | 310 | 10.94% | -632 | -22.30% | 2,834 |
| Amelia County | 271 | 23.30% | 266 | 22.87% | 536 | 46.09% | 90 | 7.74% | -265 (Note: In this county or city where Miller ran third behind Battle and Edwards, margin given is Battle vote minus Edwards vote and percentage margin Battle percentage minus Edwards percentage.) | -22.79% | 1,163 |
| Amherst County | 846 | 40.30% | 940 | 44.78% | 239 | 11.39% | 74 | 3.53% | -94 | -4.48% | 2,099 |
| Appomattox County | 1,365 | 69.18% | 189 | 9.58% | 379 | 19.21% | 40 | 2.03% | 986 | 49.97% | 1,973 |
| Arlington County | 4,402 | 44.14% | 4,789 | 48.02% | 459 | 4.60% | 323 | 3.24% | -387 | -3.88% | 9,973 |
| Augusta County | 1,067 | 56.54% | 505 | 26.76% | 282 | 14.94% | 33 | 1.75% | 562 | 29.78% | 1,887 |
| Bath County | 283 | 52.50% | 120 | 22.26% | 110 | 20.41% | 26 | 4.82% | 163 | 30.24% | 539 |
| Bedford County | 1,376 | 49.89% | 616 | 22.34% | 606 | 21.97% | 160 | 5.80% | 760 | 27.56% | 2,758 |
| Bland County | 244 | 33.84% | 213 | 29.54% | 254 | 35.23% | 10 | 1.39% | -10 | -1.39% | 721 |
| Botetourt County | 513 | 43.11% | 262 | 22.02% | 332 | 27.90% | 83 | 6.97% | 181 | 15.21% | 1,190 |
| Brunswick County | 810 | 41.52% | 376 | 19.27% | 589 | 30.19% | 176 | 9.02% | 221 | 11.33% | 1,951 |
| Buchanan County | 386 | 16.78% | 1,391 | 60.45% | 494 | 21.47% | 30 | 1.30% | 897 (Note: In this county or city where Battle ran third behind both Miller and Edwards, margin given is Miller vote minus Edwards vote and percentage margin Miller percentage minus Edwards percentage.) | 38.98% | 2,301 |
| Buckingham County | 687 | 47.71% | 218 | 15.14% | 496 | 34.44% | 39 | 2.71% | 191 | 13.26% | 1,440 |
| Campbell County | 1,178 | 47.73% | 880 | 35.66% | 267 | 10.82% | 143 | 5.79% | 298 | 12.07% | 2,468 |
| Caroline County | 697 | 53.66% | 270 | 20.79% | 235 | 18.09% | 97 | 7.47% | 427 | 32.87% | 1,299 |
| Carroll County | 325 | 31.31% | 260 | 25.05% | 439 | 42.29% | 14 | 1.35% | -114 | -10.98% | 1,038 |
| Charles City County | 123 | 22.61% | 264 | 48.53% | 98 | 18.01% | 59 | 10.85% | -141 | -25.92% | 544 |
| Charlotte County | 1,211 | 58.81% | 501 | 24.33% | 308 | 14.96% | 39 | 1.89% | 710 | 34.48% | 2,059 |
| Chesterfield County | 1,139 | 32.33% | 1,360 | 38.60% | 309 | 8.77% | 715 | 20.30% | -221 | -6.27% | 3,523 |
| Clarke County | 535 | 60.59% | 175 | 19.82% | 163 | 18.46% | 10 | 1.13% | 360 | 40.77% | 883 |
| Craig County | 166 | 47.29% | 79 | 22.51% | 98 | 27.92% | 8 | 2.28% | 68 | 19.37% | 351 |
| Culpeper County | 999 | 59.68% | 329 | 19.65% | 278 | 16.61% | 68 | 4.06% | 670 | 40.02% | 1,674 |
| Cumberland County | 345 | 37.34% | 71 | 7.68% | 437 | 47.29% | 71 | 7.68% | -92 | -9.96% | 924 |
| Dickenson County | 569 | 32.97% | 956 | 55.39% | 182 | 10.54% | 19 | 1.10% | -387 | -22.42% | 1,726 |
| Dinwiddie County | 488 | 31.83% | 356 | 23.22% | 196 | 12.79% | 493 | 32.16% | -5 (Note: In this county or cite where Arnold ran ahead of Miller and Edwards, margin given is Battle vote minus Arnold vote and percentage margin Battle percentage minus Arnold percentage.) | -0.33% | 1,533 |
| Elizabeth City County | 1,524 | 30.42% | 2,424 | 48.38% | 821 | 16.39% | 241 | 4.81% | -900 | -17.96% | 5,010 |
| Essex County | 451 | 62.99% | 140 | 19.55% | 88 | 12.29% | 37 | 5.17% | 311 | 43.44% | 716 |
| Fairfax County | 2,118 | 36.54% | 3,051 | 52.63% | 455 | 7.85% | 173 | 2.98% | -933 | -16.09% | 5,797 |
| Fauquier County | 1,472 | 56.29% | 652 | 24.93% | 426 | 16.29% | 65 | 2.49% | 820 | 31.36% | 2,615 |
| Floyd County | 115 | 35.49% | 102 | 31.48% | 95 | 29.32% | 12 | 3.70% | 13 | 4.01% | 324 |
| Fluvanna County | 502 | 68.39% | 162 | 22.07% | 42 | 5.72% | 28 | 3.81% | 340 | 46.32% | 734 |
| Franklin County | 1,376 | 49.64% | 597 | 21.54% | 579 | 20.89% | 220 | 7.94% | 779 | 28.10% | 2,772 |
| Frederick County | 1,048 | 68.14% | 297 | 19.31% | 150 | 9.75% | 43 | 2.80% | 751 | 48.83% | 1,538 |
| Giles County | 771 | 51.88% | 507 | 34.12% | 135 | 9.08% | 73 | 4.91% | 264 | 17.77% | 1,486 |
| Gloucester County | 647 | 45.40% | 216 | 15.16% | 516 | 36.21% | 46 | 3.23% | 131 | 9.19% | 1,425 |
| Goochland County | 731 | 56.54% | 334 | 25.83% | 163 | 12.61% | 65 | 5.03% | 397 | 30.70% | 1,293 |
| Grayson County | 721 | 37.30% | 475 | 24.57% | 723 | 37.40% | 14 | 0.72% | -2 | -0.10% | 1,933 |
| Greene County | 215 | 80.52% | 36 | 13.48% | 10 | 3.75% | 6 | 2.25% | 179 | 67.04% | 267 |
| Greensville County | 612 | 41.21% | 372 | 25.05% | 109 | 7.34% | 392 | 26.40% | 220 | 14.81% | 1,485 |
| Halifax County | 2,453 | 58.80% | 1,241 | 29.75% | 234 | 5.61% | 244 | 5.85% | 1,212 | 29.05% | 4,172 |
| Hanover County | 858 | 42.84% | 719 | 35.90% | 215 | 10.73% | 211 | 10.53% | 139 | 6.94% | 2,003 |
| Henrico County | 1,762 | 37.85% | 1,740 | 37.38% | 484 | 10.40% | 669 | 14.37% | 22 | 0.47% | 4,655 |
| Henry County | 678 | 36.79% | 810 | 43.95% | 266 | 14.43% | 89 | 4.83% | -132 | -7.16% | 1,843 |
| Highland County | 318 | 69.28% | 43 | 9.37% | 90 | 19.61% | 8 | 1.74% | 228 | 49.67% | 459 |
| Isle of Wight County | 437 | 26.48% | 167 | 10.12% | 1,002 | 60.73% | 44 | 2.67% | -565 | -34.24% | 1,650 |
| James City County | 131 | 34.38% | 92 | 24.15% | 74 | 19.42% | 84 | 22.05% | 39 | 10.24% | 381 |
| King and Queen County | 264 | 50.97% | 135 | 26.06% | 92 | 17.76% | 27 | 5.21% | 129 | 24.90% | 518 |
| King George County | 238 | 69.39% | 71 | 20.70% | 22 | 6.41% | 12 | 3.50% | 167 | 48.69% | 343 |
| King William County | 278 | 35.23% | 202 | 25.60% | 237 | 30.04% | 72 | 9.13% | 41 | 5.20% | 789 |
| Lancaster County | 620 | 50.86% | 448 | 36.75% | 114 | 9.35% | 37 | 3.04% | 172 | 14.11% | 1,219 |
| Lee County | 317 | 12.83% | 1,698 | 68.74% | 431 | 17.45% | 24 | 0.97% | 1,267 | 51.30% | 2,470 |
| Loudoun County | 1,489 | 60.43% | 779 | 31.62% | 163 | 6.62% | 33 | 1.34% | 710 | 28.81% | 2,464 |
| Louisa County | 821 | 54.08% | 499 | 32.87% | 125 | 8.23% | 73 | 4.81% | 322 | 21.21% | 1,518 |
| Lunenburg County | 1,073 | 49.38% | 579 | 26.65% | 374 | 17.21% | 147 | 6.76% | 494 | 22.73% | 2,173 |
| Madison County | 433 | 67.66% | 113 | 17.66% | 58 | 9.06% | 36 | 5.63% | 320 | 50.00% | 640 |
| Mathews County | 457 | 50.89% | 333 | 37.08% | 87 | 9.69% | 21 | 2.34% | 124 | 13.81% | 898 |
| Mecklenburg County | 1,360 | 46.54% | 845 | 28.92% | 441 | 15.09% | 276 | 9.45% | 515 | 17.62% | 2,922 |
| Middlesex County | 409 | 50.43% | 147 | 18.13% | 214 | 26.39% | 41 | 5.06% | 195 | 24.04% | 811 |
| Montgomery County | 1,008 | 53.14% | 569 | 29.99% | 277 | 14.60% | 43 | 2.27% | 439 | 23.14% | 1,897 |
| Nansemond County | 654 | 30.97% | 472 | 22.35% | 851 | 40.29% | 135 | 6.39% | -197 | -9.33% | 2,112 |
| Nelson County | 661 | 41.44% | 840 | 52.66% | 54 | 3.39% | 40 | 2.51% | -179 | -11.22% | 1,595 |
| New Kent County | 189 | 39.96% | 156 | 32.98% | 74 | 15.64% | 54 | 11.42% | 33 | 6.98% | 473 |
| Norfolk County | 2,131 | 26.49% | 4,580 | 56.93% | 831 | 10.33% | 503 | 6.25% | -2,449 | -30.44% | 8,045 |
| Northampton County | 1,181 | 60.35% | 401 | 20.49% | 286 | 14.61% | 89 | 4.55% | 780 | 39.86% | 1,957 |
| Northumberland County | 393 | 52.54% | 223 | 29.81% | 110 | 14.71% | 22 | 2.94% | 170 | 22.73% | 748 |
| Nottoway County | 774 | 38.37% | 487 | 24.14% | 449 | 22.26% | 307 | 15.22% | 287 | 14.23% | 2,017 |
| Orange County | 870 | 51.60% | 473 | 28.05% | 266 | 15.78% | 77 | 4.57% | 397 | 23.55% | 1,686 |
| Page County | 1,254 | 76.65% | 296 | 18.09% | 71 | 4.34% | 15 | 0.92% | 958 | 58.56% | 1,636 |
| Patrick County | 1,338 | 77.12% | 123 | 7.09% | 223 | 12.85% | 51 | 2.94% | 1,115 | 64.27% | 1,735 |
| Pittsylvania County | 2,928 | 53.75% | 2,032 | 37.30% | 195 | 3.58% | 292 | 5.36% | 896 | 16.45% | 5,447 |
| Powhatan County | 191 | 30.13% | 178 | 28.08% | 236 | 37.22% | 29 | 4.57% | -45 | -7.10% | 634 |
| Prince Edward County | 836 | 48.72% | 332 | 19.35% | 462 | 26.92% | 86 | 5.01% | 374 | 21.79% | 1,716 |
| Prince George County | 327 | 26.01% | 431 | 34.29% | 56 | 4.46% | 443 | 35.24% | -12 (Note: In this county or city where Arnold ran ahead of both Battle and Edwards, margin given is Miller vote minus Arnold vote and percentage margin Miller percentage minus Arnold percentage.) | -0.95% | 1,257 |
| Prince William County | 769 | 49.71% | 357 | 23.08% | 344 | 22.24% | 77 | 4.98% | 412 | 26.63% | 1,547 |
| Princess Anne County | 2,437 | 67.98% | 636 | 17.74% | 310 | 8.65% | 202 | 5.63% | 1,801 | 50.24% | 3,585 |
| Pulaski County | 1,157 | 61.18% | 399 | 21.10% | 288 | 15.23% | 47 | 2.49% | 758 | 40.08% | 1,891 |
| Rappahannock County | 798 | 82.61% | 126 | 13.04% | 30 | 3.11% | 12 | 1.24% | 672 | 69.57% | 966 |
| Richmond County | 468 | 55.65% | 220 | 26.16% | 86 | 10.23% | 67 | 7.97% | 248 | 29.49% | 841 |
| Roanoke County | 1,688 | 46.60% | 1,092 | 30.15% | 613 | 16.92% | 229 | 6.32% | 596 | 16.45% | 3,622 |
| Rockbridge County | 761 | 38.75% | 874 | 44.50% | 291 | 14.82% | 38 | 1.93% | -113 | -5.75% | 1,964 |
| Rockingham County | 1,241 | 61.16% | 177 | 8.72% | 578 | 28.49% | 33 | 1.63% | 663 | 32.68% | 2,029 |
| Russell County | 1,226 | 50.25% | 409 | 16.76% | 774 | 31.72% | 31 | 1.27% | 452 | 18.52% | 2,440 |
| Scott County | 531 | 26.17% | 1,003 | 49.43% | 484 | 23.85% | 11 | 0.54% | -472 | -23.26% | 2,029 |
| Shenandoah County | 1,259 | 75.48% | 251 | 15.05% | 118 | 7.07% | 40 | 2.40% | 1,008 | 60.43% | 1,668 |
| Smyth County | 422 | 29.63% | 290 | 20.37% | 665 | 46.70% | 47 | 3.30% | -243 | -17.06% | 1,424 |
| Southampton County | 843 | 41.63% | 652 | 32.20% | 439 | 21.68% | 91 | 4.49% | 191 | 9.43% | 2,025 |
| Spotsylvania County | 884 | 48.65% | 817 | 44.96% | 57 | 3.14% | 59 | 3.25% | 67 | 3.69% | 1,817 |
| Stafford County | 670 | 52.80% | 435 | 34.28% | 115 | 9.06% | 49 | 3.86% | 235 | 18.52% | 1,269 |
| Surry County | 315 | 36.80% | 167 | 19.51% | 268 | 31.31% | 106 | 12.38% | 47 | 5.49% | 856 |
| Sussex County | 712 | 49.69% | 191 | 13.33% | 339 | 23.66% | 191 | 13.33% | 373 | 26.03% | 1,433 |
| Tazewell County | 826 | 38.15% | 561 | 25.91% | 756 | 34.92% | 22 | 1.02% | 70 | 3.23% | 2,165 |
| Warren County | 1,226 | 63.82% | 587 | 30.56% | 75 | 3.90% | 33 | 1.72% | 639 | 33.26% | 1,921 |
| Warwick County | 724 | 25.84% | 915 | 32.66% | 841 | 30.01% | 322 | 11.49% | 74 | 2.64% | 2,802 |
| Washington County | 484 | 26.74% | 415 | 22.93% | 885 | 48.90% | 26 | 1.44% | -401 | -22.15% | 1,810 |
| Westmoreland County | 576 | 58.78% | 269 | 27.45% | 105 | 10.71% | 30 | 3.06% | 307 | 31.33% | 980 |
| Wise County | 1,108 | 25.41% | 2,351 | 53.91% | 810 | 18.57% | 92 | 2.11% | -1,243 | -28.50% | 4,361 |
| Wythe County | 981 | 59.67% | 196 | 11.92% | 448 | 27.25% | 19 | 1.16% | 533 | 32.42% | 1,644 |
| York County | 378 | 24.79% | 605 | 39.67% | 435 | 28.52% | 107 | 7.02% | 170 | 11.15% | 1,525 |
| Alexandria City | 2,230 | 34.09% | 3,550 | 54.26% | 425 | 6.50% | 337 | 5.15% | -1,320 | -20.18% | 6,542 |
| Bristol City | 484 | 26.74% | 415 | 22.93% | 885 | 48.90% | 26 | 1.44% | -401 | -22.15% | 1,810 |
| Buena Vista City | 264 | 46.73% | 263 | 46.55% | 32 | 5.66% | 6 | 1.06% | 1 | 0.18% | 565 |
| Charlottesville City | 2,151 | 63.73% | 1,084 | 32.12% | 76 | 2.25% | 64 | 1.90% | 1,067 | 31.61% | 3,375 |
| Clifton Forge City | 273 | 22.25% | 759 | 61.86% | 45 | 3.67% | 150 | 12.22% | -486 | -39.61% | 1,227 |
| Colonial Heights City | 196 | 22.02% | 198 | 22.25% | 145 | 16.29% | 351 | 39.44% | -153 | -17.19% | 890 |
| Danville City | 2,781 | 44.63% | 2,475 | 39.72% | 533 | 8.55% | 442 | 7.09% | 306 | 4.91% | 6,231 |
| Falls Church City | 351 | 41.15% | 435 | 51.00% | 48 | 5.63% | 19 | 2.23% | -84 | -9.85% | 853 |
| Fredericksburg City | 942 | 44.96% | 830 | 39.62% | 125 | 5.97% | 198 | 9.45% | 112 | 5.35% | 2,095 |
| Hampton City | 408 | 30.89% | 557 | 42.17% | 291 | 22.03% | 65 | 4.92% | -149 | -11.28% | 1,321 |
| Harrisonburg City | 975 | 62.30% | 91 | 5.81% | 438 | 27.99% | 61 | 3.90% | 537 | 34.31% | 1,565 |
| Hopewell City | 808 | 49.18% | 291 | 17.71% | 27 | 1.64% | 517 | 31.47% | 291 | 17.71% | 1,643 |
| Lynchburg City | 3,159 | 54.85% | 1,908 | 33.13% | 339 | 5.89% | 353 | 6.13% | 1,251 | 21.72% | 5,759 |
| Martinsville City | 911 | 47.75% | 808 | 42.35% | 138 | 7.23% | 51 | 2.67% | 103 | 5.40% | 1,908 |
| Newport News City | 831 | 17.94% | 1,900 | 41.02% | 1,577 | 34.05% | 324 | 6.99% | 323 | 6.97% | 4,632 |
| Norfolk City | 5,042 | 39.49% | 5,261 | 41.21% | 1,487 | 11.65% | 977 | 7.65% | -219 | -1.72% | 12,767 |
| Petersburg City | 969 | 24.51% | 1,051 | 26.58% | 262 | 6.63% | 1,672 | 42.29% | -621 | -15.71% | 3,954 |
| Portsmouth City | 1,515 | 26.25% | 3,321 | 57.55% | 691 | 11.97% | 244 | 4.23% | -1,806 | -31.29% | 5,771 |
| Radford City | 402 | 29.89% | 652 | 48.48% | 251 | 18.66% | 40 | 2.97% | -250 | -18.59% | 1,345 |
| Richmond City | 12,478 | 37.10% | 13,668 | 40.64% | 4,264 | 12.68% | 3,225 | 9.59% | -1,190 | -3.54% | 33,635 |
| Roanoke City | 5,563 | 44.47% | 4,370 | 34.93% | 1,626 | 13.00% | 950 | 7.59% | 1,193 | 9.54% | 12,509 |
| South Norfolk City | 280 | 27.72% | 497 | 49.21% | 103 | 10.20% | 130 | 12.87% | -217 | -21.49% | 1,010 |
| Staunton City | 1,239 | 51.80% | 600 | 25.08% | 455 | 19.02% | 98 | 4.10% | 639 | 26.71% | 2,392 |
| Suffolk City | 1,165 | 45.26% | 732 | 28.44% | 402 | 15.62% | 275 | 10.68% | 433 | 16.82% | 2,574 |
| Waynesboro City | 508 | 37.08% | 643 | 46.93% | 140 | 10.22% | 79 | 5.77% | -135 | -9.85% | 1,370 |
| Williamsburg City | 213 | 27.66% | 376 | 48.83% | 89 | 11.56% | 92 | 11.95% | -163 | -21.17% | 770 |
| Winchester City | 1,134 | 65.89% | 391 | 22.72% | 101 | 5.87% | 95 | 5.52% | 743 | 43.17% | 1,721 |
| Totals | 135,426 | 42.77% | 111,697 | 35.28% | 47,435 | 14.98% | 22,054 | 6.97% | 23,729 | 7.49% | 316,612 |

== General election ==
=== Candidates ===
- John S. Battle, State Senator (Democratic)
- Walter Johnson, candidate for Virginia's 1st congressional district in 1946 (Republican)
- Clarke T. Robb (Social Democratic)

=== Results ===
1949 Virginia gubernatorial election
| Party | Candidate | Votes | % | ±% |
|---|---|---|---|---|
| Democratic | John S. Battle | 184,772 | 70.43% | +3.85% |
| Republican | Walter Johnson | 71,991 | 27.44% | −3.60% |
| Social Democratic | Clarke T. Robb | 5,569 | 2.12% | +2.12% |
| Majority | | 112,781 | 42.99% | +7.46% |
| Turnout | | 262,332 | | |
| Democratic hold | | Swing | | |

==== Results by county or independent city ====
1949 Virginia gubernatorial election by county or independent city
| | John Stewart Battle Democratic | | Walter Johnson Republican | | Clarke T. Robb Social Democratic | | Margin | | Total votes cast |
| | # | % | # | % | # | % | # | % | Total votes cast |
|---|---|---|---|---|---|---|---|---|---|
| Accomack County | 1,313 | 89.87% | 138 | 9.45% | 10 | 0.68% | 1,175 | 80.42% | 1,461 |
| Albemarle County | 1,831 | 85.24% | 303 | 14.11% | 14 | 0.65% | 1,528 | 71.14% | 2,148 |
| Alleghany County | 1,770 | 61.78% | 1,022 | 35.67% | 73 | 2.55% | 748 | 26.11% | 2,865 |
| Amelia County | 867 | 77.76% | 236 | 21.17% | 12 | 1.08% | 631 | 56.59% | 1,115 |
| Amherst County | 1,040 | 82.21% | 212 | 16.76% | 13 | 1.03% | 828 | 65.45% | 1,265 |
| Appomattox County | 1,224 | 93.29% | 85 | 6.48% | 3 | 0.23% | 1,139 | 86.81% | 1,312 |
| Arlington County | 8,563 | 62.31% | 4,588 | 33.39% | 591 | 4.30% | 3,975 | 28.93% | 13,742 |
| Augusta County | 1,226 | 67.77% | 574 | 31.73% | 9 | 0.50% | 652 | 36.04% | 1,809 |
| Bath County | 330 | 73.99% | 114 | 25.56% | 2 | 0.45% | 216 | 48.43% | 446 |
| Bedford County | 1,661 | 74.99% | 530 | 23.93% | 24 | 1.08% | 1,131 | 51.06% | 2,215 |
| Bland County | 671 | 58.71% | 455 | 39.81% | 17 | 1.49% | 216 | 18.90% | 1,143 |
| Botetourt County | 1,344 | 59.52% | 878 | 38.88% | 36 | 1.59% | 466 | 20.64% | 2,258 |
| Brunswick County | 1,109 | 91.58% | 93 | 7.68% | 9 | 0.74% | 1,016 | 83.90% | 1,211 |
| Buchanan County | 1,678 | 36.90% | 2,727 | 59.96% | 143 | 3.14% | -1,049 | -23.07% | 4,548 |
| Buckingham County | 593 | 79.60% | 135 | 18.12% | 17 | 2.28% | 458 | 61.48% | 745 |
| Campbell County | 1,142 | 77.01% | 319 | 21.51% | 22 | 1.48% | 823 | 55.50% | 1,483 |
| Caroline County | 660 | 85.49% | 97 | 12.56% | 15 | 1.94% | 563 | 72.93% | 772 |
| Carroll County | 767 | 48.58% | 773 | 48.96% | 39 | 2.47% | -6 | -0.38% | 1,579 |
| Charles City County | 234 | 61.42% | 130 | 34.12% | 17 | 4.46% | 104 | 27.30% | 381 |
| Charlotte County | 847 | 88.97% | 97 | 10.19% | 8 | 0.84% | 750 | 78.78% | 952 |
| Chesterfield County | 1,704 | 76.28% | 493 | 22.07% | 37 | 1.66% | 1,211 | 54.21% | 2,234 |
| Clarke County | 517 | 86.74% | 76 | 12.75% | 3 | 0.50% | 441 | 73.99% | 596 |
| Craig County | 331 | 64.15% | 176 | 34.11% | 9 | 1.74% | 155 | 30.04% | 516 |
| Culpeper County | 865 | 89.27% | 95 | 9.80% | 9 | 0.93% | 770 | 79.46% | 969 |
| Cumberland County | 365 | 80.22% | 83 | 18.24% | 7 | 1.54% | 282 | 61.98% | 455 |
| Dickenson County | 1,731 | 53.15% | 1,364 | 41.88% | 162 | 4.97% | 367 | 11.27% | 3,257 |
| Dinwiddie County | 815 | 90.35% | 75 | 8.31% | 12 | 1.33% | 740 | 82.04% | 902 |
| Elizabeth City County | 2,730 | 75.41% | 834 | 23.04% | 56 | 1.55% | 1,896 | 52.38% | 3,620 |
| Essex County | 471 | 85.17% | 80 | 14.47% | 2 | 0.36% | 391 | 70.71% | 553 |
| Fairfax County | 3,095 | 61.06% | 1,806 | 35.63% | 168 | 3.31% | 1,289 | 25.43% | 5,069 |
| Fauquier County | 1,197 | 88.14% | 149 | 10.97% | 12 | 0.88% | 1,048 | 77.17% | 1,358 |
| Floyd County | 377 | 45.26% | 428 | 51.38% | 28 | 3.36% | -51 | -6.12% | 833 |
| Fluvanna County | 475 | 80.92% | 101 | 17.21% | 11 | 1.87% | 374 | 63.71% | 587 |
| Franklin County | 1,472 | 76.67% | 416 | 21.67% | 32 | 1.67% | 1,056 | 55.00% | 1,920 |
| Frederick County | 729 | 73.94% | 236 | 23.94% | 21 | 2.13% | 493 | 50.00% | 986 |
| Giles County | 1,145 | 65.80% | 562 | 32.30% | 33 | 1.90% | 583 | 33.51% | 1,740 |
| Gloucester County | 710 | 78.11% | 187 | 20.57% | 12 | 1.32% | 523 | 57.54% | 909 |
| Goochland County | 667 | 77.20% | 191 | 22.11% | 6 | 0.69% | 476 | 55.09% | 864 |
| Grayson County | 3,231 | 47.48% | 3,484 | 51.20% | 90 | 1.32% | -253 | -3.72% | 6,805 |
| Greene County | 292 | 67.75% | 123 | 28.54% | 16 | 3.71% | 169 | 39.21% | 431 |
| Greensville County | 699 | 82.82% | 128 | 15.17% | 17 | 2.01% | 571 | 67.65% | 844 |
| Halifax County | 1,825 | 86.66% | 269 | 12.77% | 12 | 0.57% | 1,556 | 73.88% | 2,106 |
| Hanover County | 992 | 78.36% | 258 | 20.38% | 16 | 1.26% | 734 | 57.98% | 1,266 |
| Henrico County | 2,131 | 76.00% | 631 | 22.50% | 42 | 1.50% | 1,500 | 53.50% | 2,804 |
| Henry County | 830 | 60.94% | 487 | 35.76% | 45 | 3.30% | 343 | 25.18% | 1,362 |
| Highland County | 298 | 66.67% | 141 | 31.54% | 8 | 1.79% | 157 | 35.12% | 447 |
| Isle of Wight County | 707 | 84.17% | 118 | 14.05% | 15 | 1.79% | 589 | 70.12% | 840 |
| James City County | 209 | 77.99% | 53 | 19.78% | 6 | 2.24% | 156 | 58.21% | 268 |
| King and Queen County | 317 | 80.25% | 67 | 16.96% | 11 | 2.78% | 250 | 63.29% | 395 |
| King George County | 330 | 71.43% | 112 | 24.24% | 20 | 4.33% | 218 | 47.19% | 462 |
| King William County | 560 | 82.60% | 102 | 15.04% | 16 | 2.36% | 458 | 67.55% | 678 |
| Lancaster County | 598 | 75.22% | 193 | 24.28% | 4 | 0.50% | 405 | 50.94% | 795 |
| Lee County | 2,693 | 48.87% | 2,631 | 47.74% | 187 | 3.39% | 62 | 1.13% | 5,511 |
| Loudoun County | 1,487 | 85.61% | 234 | 13.47% | 16 | 0.92% | 1,253 | 72.14% | 1,737 |
| Louisa County | 861 | 76.06% | 251 | 22.17% | 20 | 1.77% | 610 | 53.89% | 1,132 |
| Lunenburg County | 1,288 | 87.38% | 180 | 12.21% | 6 | 0.41% | 1,108 | 75.17% | 1,474 |
| Madison County | 398 | 73.98% | 135 | 25.09% | 5 | 0.93% | 263 | 48.88% | 538 |
| Mathews County | 548 | 76.54% | 161 | 22.49% | 7 | 0.98% | 387 | 54.05% | 716 |
| Mecklenburg County | 1,275 | 85.46% | 182 | 12.20% | 35 | 2.35% | 1,093 | 73.26% | 1,492 |
| Middlesex County | 517 | 84.34% | 90 | 14.68% | 6 | 0.98% | 427 | 69.66% | 613 |
| Montgomery County | 1,652 | 59.42% | 1,086 | 39.06% | 42 | 1.51% | 566 | 20.36% | 2,780 |
| Nansemond County | 748 | 79.32% | 176 | 18.66% | 19 | 2.01% | 572 | 60.66% | 943 |
| Nelson County | 937 | 81.76% | 175 | 15.27% | 34 | 2.97% | 762 | 66.49% | 1,146 |
| New Kent County | 265 | 81.79% | 54 | 16.67% | 5 | 1.54% | 211 | 65.12% | 324 |
| Norfolk County | 2,639 | 66.69% | 1,170 | 29.57% | 148 | 3.74% | 1,469 | 37.12% | 3,957 |
| Northampton County | 861 | 88.67% | 100 | 10.30% | 10 | 1.03% | 761 | 78.37% | 971 |
| Northumberland County | 397 | 50.96% | 381 | 48.91% | 1 | 0.13% | 16 | 2.05% | 779 |
| Nottoway County | 1,532 | 87.34% | 206 | 11.74% | 16 | 0.91% | 1,326 | 75.60% | 1,754 |
| Orange County | 882 | 80.84% | 188 | 17.23% | 21 | 1.92% | 694 | 63.61% | 1,091 |
| Page County | 1,534 | 77.67% | 397 | 20.10% | 44 | 2.23% | 1,137 | 57.57% | 1,975 |
| Patrick County | 807 | 85.94% | 124 | 13.21% | 8 | 0.85% | 683 | 72.74% | 939 |
| Pittsylvania County | 2,498 | 85.52% | 386 | 13.21% | 37 | 1.27% | 2,112 | 72.30% | 2,921 |
| Powhatan County | 382 | 69.45% | 163 | 29.64% | 5 | 0.91% | 219 | 39.82% | 550 |
| Prince Edward County | 1,288 | 90.01% | 134 | 9.36% | 9 | 0.63% | 1,154 | 80.64% | 1,431 |
| Prince George County | 509 | 74.42% | 164 | 23.98% | 11 | 1.61% | 345 | 50.44% | 684 |
| Prince William County | 908 | 83.07% | 166 | 15.19% | 19 | 1.74% | 742 | 67.89% | 1,093 |
| Princess Anne County | 1,809 | 88.59% | 203 | 9.94% | 30 | 1.47% | 1,606 | 78.65% | 2,042 |
| Pulaski County | 1,467 | 68.58% | 648 | 30.29% | 24 | 1.12% | 819 | 38.29% | 2,139 |
| Rappahannock County | 591 | 91.49% | 43 | 6.66% | 12 | 1.86% | 548 | 84.83% | 646 |
| Richmond County | 334 | 78.40% | 90 | 21.13% | 2 | 0.47% | 244 | 57.28% | 426 |
| Roanoke County | 2,227 | 69.05% | 926 | 28.71% | 72 | 2.23% | 1,301 | 40.34% | 3,225 |
| Rockbridge County | 1,238 | 79.21% | 309 | 19.77% | 16 | 1.02% | 929 | 59.44% | 1,563 |
| Rockingham County | 2,120 | 63.86% | 1,157 | 34.85% | 43 | 1.30% | 963 | 29.01% | 3,320 |
| Russell County | 1,988 | 54.53% | 1,583 | 43.42% | 75 | 2.06% | 405 | 11.11% | 3,646 |
| Scott County | 2,532 | 47.11% | 2,659 | 49.47% | 184 | 3.42% | -127 | -2.36% | 5,375 |
| Shenandoah County | 1,620 | 60.13% | 1,041 | 38.64% | 33 | 1.22% | 579 | 21.49% | 2,694 |
| Smyth County | 1,690 | 48.20% | 1,563 | 44.58% | 253 | 7.22% | 127 | 3.62% | 3,506 |
| Southampton County | 1,032 | 85.57% | 155 | 12.85% | 19 | 1.58% | 877 | 72.72% | 1,206 |
| Spotsylvania County | 850 | 66.10% | 413 | 32.12% | 23 | 1.79% | 437 | 33.98% | 1,286 |
| Stafford County | 591 | 62.08% | 339 | 35.61% | 22 | 2.31% | 252 | 26.47% | 952 |
| Surry County | 420 | 82.19% | 49 | 9.59% | 42 | 8.22% | 371 | 72.60% | 511 |
| Sussex County | 734 | 92.44% | 54 | 6.80% | 6 | 0.76% | 680 | 85.64% | 794 |
| Tazewell County | 1,305 | 51.58% | 1,171 | 46.28% | 54 | 2.13% | 134 | 5.30% | 2,530 |
| Warren County | 1,381 | 79.73% | 320 | 18.48% | 31 | 1.79% | 1,061 | 61.26% | 1,732 |
| Warwick County | 1,341 | 75.63% | 405 | 22.84% | 27 | 1.52% | 936 | 52.79% | 1,773 |
| Washington County | 1,489 | 59.63% | 944 | 37.81% | 64 | 2.56% | 545 | 21.83% | 2,497 |
| Westmoreland County | 508 | 81.02% | 114 | 18.18% | 5 | 0.80% | 394 | 62.84% | 627 |
| Wise County | 2,767 | 65.18% | 1,347 | 31.73% | 131 | 3.09% | 1,420 | 33.45% | 4,245 |
| Wythe County | 1,964 | 52.44% | 1,730 | 46.19% | 51 | 1.36% | 234 | 6.25% | 3,745 |
| York County | 700 | 72.46% | 242 | 25.05% | 24 | 2.48% | 458 | 47.41% | 966 |
| Alexandria City | 3,068 | 66.31% | 1,421 | 30.71% | 138 | 2.98% | 1,647 | 35.60% | 4,627 |
| Bristol City | 949 | 81.74% | 191 | 16.45% | 21 | 1.81% | 758 | 65.29% | 1,161 |
| Buena Vista City | 314 | 81.98% | 62 | 16.19% | 7 | 1.83% | 252 | 65.80% | 383 |
| Charlottesville City | 2,287 | 85.05% | 381 | 14.17% | 21 | 0.78% | 1,906 | 70.88% | 2,689 |
| Clifton Forge City | 857 | 60.87% | 534 | 37.93% | 17 | 1.21% | 323 | 22.94% | 1,408 |
| Colonial Heights City | 403 | 83.26% | 79 | 16.32% | 2 | 0.41% | 324 | 66.94% | 484 |
| Danville City | 3,560 | 86.37% | 503 | 12.20% | 59 | 1.43% | 3,057 | 74.16% | 4,122 |
| Falls Church City | 612 | 62.90% | 314 | 32.27% | 47 | 4.83% | 298 | 30.63% | 973 |
| Fredericksburg City | 1,665 | 77.77% | 454 | 21.21% | 22 | 1.03% | 1,211 | 56.56% | 2,141 |
| Hampton City | 794 | 84.20% | 139 | 14.74% | 10 | 1.06% | 655 | 69.46% | 943 |
| Harrisonburg City | 1,786 | 76.95% | 521 | 22.45% | 14 | 0.60% | 1,265 | 54.50% | 2,321 |
| Hopewell City | 808 | 71.76% | 291 | 25.84% | 27 | 2.40% | 517 | 45.91% | 1,126 |
| Lynchburg City | 2,389 | 80.76% | 514 | 17.38% | 55 | 1.86% | 1,875 | 63.39% | 2,958 |
| Martinsville City | 1,225 | 78.37% | 317 | 20.28% | 21 | 1.34% | 908 | 58.09% | 1,563 |
| Newport News City | 2,301 | 76.04% | 667 | 22.04% | 58 | 1.92% | 1,634 | 54.00% | 3,026 |
| Norfolk City | 7,154 | 77.44% | 1,841 | 19.93% | 243 | 2.63% | 5,313 | 57.51% | 9,238 |
| Petersburg City | 2,232 | 85.78% | 327 | 12.57% | 43 | 1.65% | 1,905 | 73.21% | 2,602 |
| Portsmouth City | 2,378 | 70.31% | 860 | 25.43% | 144 | 4.26% | 1,518 | 44.88% | 3,382 |
| Radford City | 1,124 | 62.07% | 666 | 36.78% | 21 | 1.16% | 458 | 25.29% | 1,811 |
| Richmond City | 17,681 | 76.90% | 4,943 | 21.50% | 369 | 1.60% | 12,738 | 55.40% | 22,993 |
| Roanoke City | 4,939 | 70.32% | 1,934 | 27.53% | 151 | 2.15% | 3,005 | 42.78% | 7,024 |
| South Norfolk City | 923 | 69.29% | 351 | 26.35% | 58 | 4.35% | 572 | 42.94% | 1,332 |
| Staunton City | 1,145 | 69.56% | 489 | 29.71% | 12 | 0.73% | 656 | 39.85% | 1,646 |
| Suffolk City | 650 | 80.75% | 141 | 17.52% | 14 | 1.74% | 509 | 63.23% | 805 |
| Waynesboro City | 826 | 78.44% | 219 | 20.80% | 8 | 0.76% | 607 | 57.64% | 1,053 |
| Williamsburg City | 381 | 85.81% | 57 | 12.84% | 6 | 1.35% | 324 | 72.97% | 444 |
| Winchester City | 1,432 | 79.60% | 352 | 19.57% | 15 | 0.83% | 1,080 | 60.03% | 1,799 |
| Total | 184,772 | 70.43% | 71,991 | 27.44% | 5,569 | 2.12% | 112,781 | 42.99% | 262,332 |

Counties and independent cities that flipped from Democratic to Republican

- Buchanan

Counties and independent cities that flipped from Republican to Democratic

- Bland
- Montgomery
- Page
- Roanoke
- Smyth
- Shenadoah
- Wythe
- Roanoke (independent city)
