= Robert Tuck =

Robert Tuck may refer to:

- Robert C. Tuck (1927–2015), Canadian Anglican priest, historian, and cartoonist
- Robert J. Tuck (1863–1930), American politician in the Virginia House of Delegates
- Robert Stanford Tuck (1916–1987), British fighter pilot
