= James Lacy =

James Lacy may refer to:

- James Lacy (actor), British stage actor and theatre manager
- James J. Lacy, American politician (State Comptroller) from Maryland
- James L. Lacy, American politician from Tennessee
- James T. Lacy, American politician from Virginia
- Jim Lacy, American basketball player
