= Senator Edmondson =

Senator Edmondson may refer to:

- Henry A. Edmondson (1833–1918), Virginia State Senate
- J. Howard Edmondson (1925–1971), Oklahoma State Senate
