= General election, 1945 =

General election, 1945 may refer to:

- 1945 Sammarinese general election
- 1945 United Kingdom general election
- 1945 Faroese general election
- 1945 Maltese general election
- 1945 Nova Scotia general election
- 1945 British Columbia general election
- 1945 Liechtenstein general election
- 1945 Peruvian general election
- 1945 Northern Ireland general election
- 1945 Indian general election
- 1945 Manitoba general election
- 1945 Nova Scotia general election
- 1945 Ontario general election

== See also ==
- List of elections in 1945
