= 1945 Virginia lieutenant gubernatorial election =

- November 6, 1945
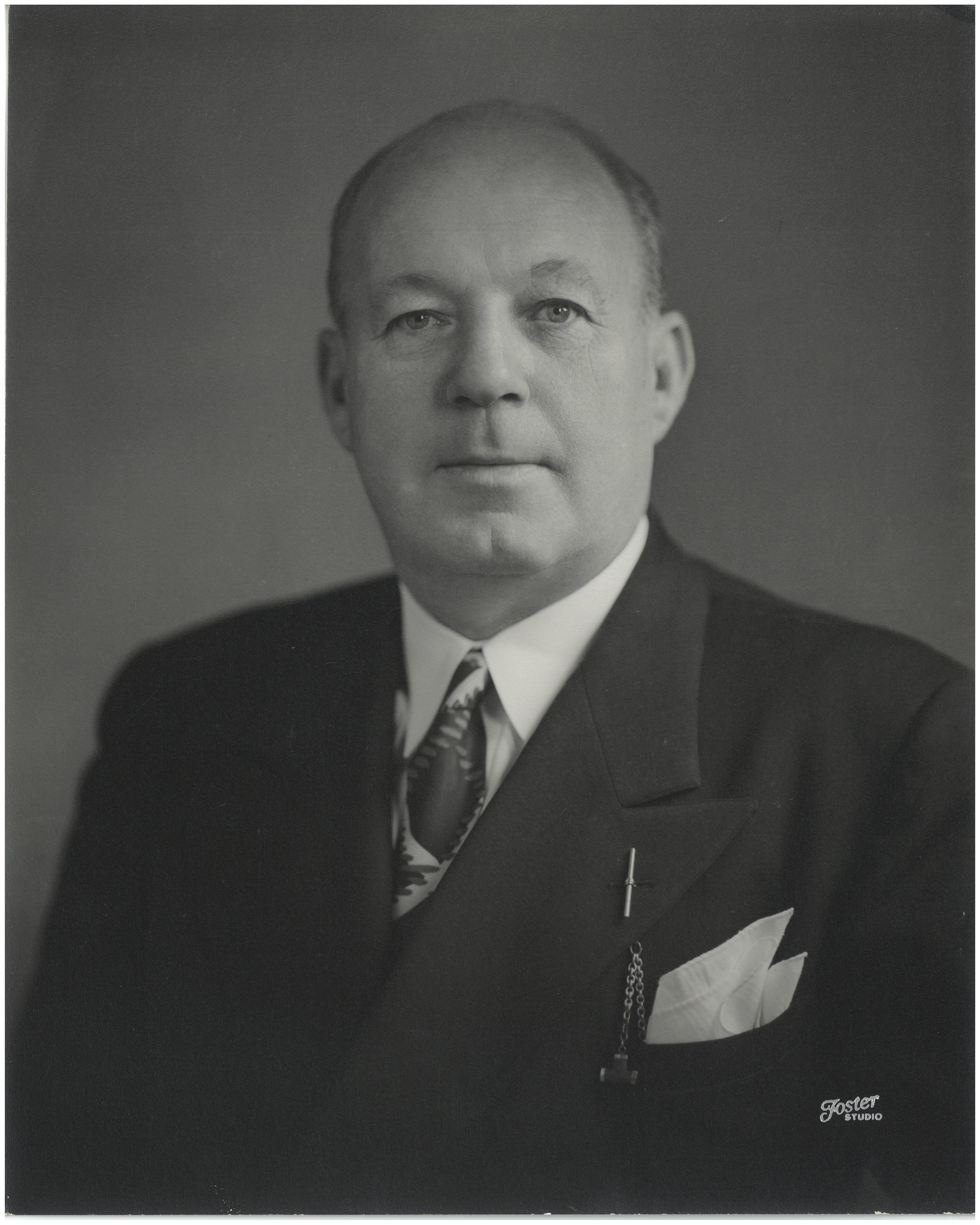

Nominee	Lewis Preston Collins II	Carl A. Marshall
Party	Democratic	Republican
Popular vote	110,689	52,549
Percentage	67.52%	32.05%
- County and independent city results Collins: 50–60% 60–70% 70–80% 80–90% >90% Marshall: 50–60% 60–70%
Lieutenant Governor before election
William M. Tuck
Democratic
Elected Lieutenant Governor
Lewis Preston Collins II
Democratic

The 1945 Virginia lieutenant gubernatorial election was held on November 6, 1945, in order to elect the lieutenant governor of Virginia. Democratic nominee and incumbent member of the Virginia House of Delegates Lewis Preston Collins II defeated Republican nominee Carl A. Marshall and independent candidate and incumbent member of the Virginia House of Delegates Charles R. Fenwick.

== General election ==
On election day, November 6, 1945, Democratic nominee Lewis Preston Collins II won the election by a margin of 58,140 votes against his foremost opponent Republican nominee Carl A. Marshall, thereby retaining Democratic control over the office of lieutenant governor. Collins was sworn in as the 26th lieutenant governor of Virginia on January 20, 1946.

=== Results ===
Virginia lieutenant gubernatorial election, 1945
Party	Candidate	Votes	%
Democratic	Lewis Preston Collins II	110,689	67.52
Republican	Carl A. Marshall	52,549	32.05
Independent	Charles R. Fenwick	701	0.43
Total votes		163,939	100.00
Democratic hold			
