= Buckshoal Farm =

Historic house in Virginia, United States

- U.S. National Register of Historic Places
- Virginia Landmarks Register
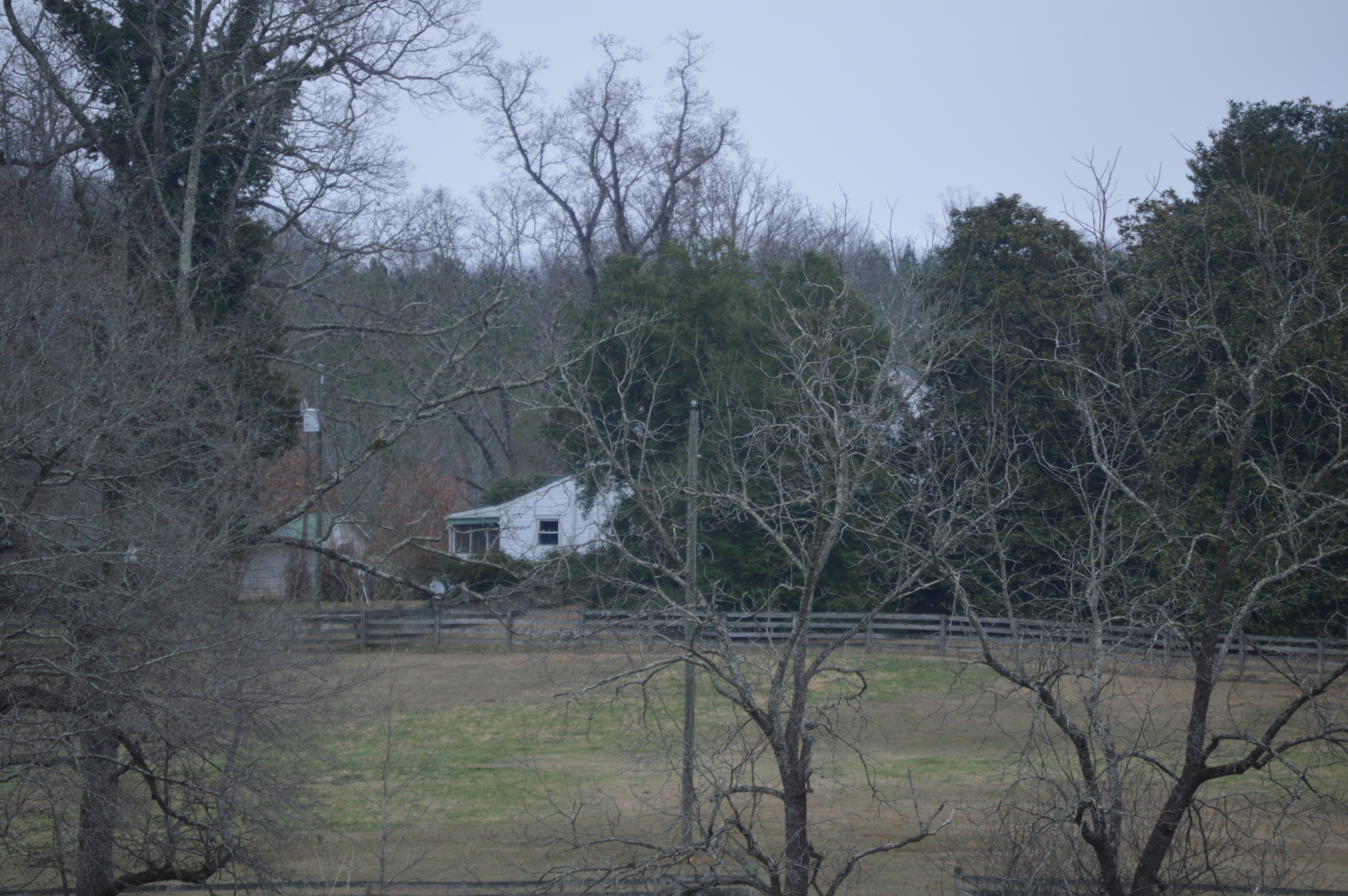
- Outbuildings at the farm

- Location within Virginia Location within the United States
- Location: VA 737, near Omega, Virginia
- Coordinates: 36°38′33″N 78°46′15″W
- Area: 275 acres (111 ha)
- Built: 1810
- NRHP reference No.: 87001473
- VLR No.: 041-0108

Significant dates
- Added to NRHP: September 16, 1987
- Designated VLR: March 17, 1987

Buckshoal Farm is a historic home and tobacco farm located near Omega in Halifax County, Virginia. Typical of early homes in the area, which were expanded in various architectural styles during the previous 150 years, it is best known as the birthplace, favorite retreat and eventual death location of Virginia Governor and later U.S. Congressman William M. Tuck, who called it by this name (after Buckshoal Creek on the property), although his father called it "Valley Home". It was listed on the National Register of Historic Places in 1987, four years after Tuck's death.

== History ==
The earliest log section, two storeys with clapboard siding, was built in the early-19th century, and was acquired by Mark Alexander Wilkinson, Tuck's great-grandfather. In 1841 Alexander constructed a two-story pitched roof section in the vernacular Italianate style perpendicular to the older section, which greatly expanded the residence, and included the main staircase used today. Tuck's father had also been born on the tobacco farm, and had served in the Virginia General Assembly. After Tuck's death, his family rented out the property.

== Architecture ==
The house features a porch configured to follows the shape of the ell, although that front section was removed in 1921 and replaced by a front porch with tapering wood posts set on brick piers. It also features a bay at the front of the house. Two outbuildings are also historically significant: a frame shed and a log well house.
