= William P. Barksdale =

American politician

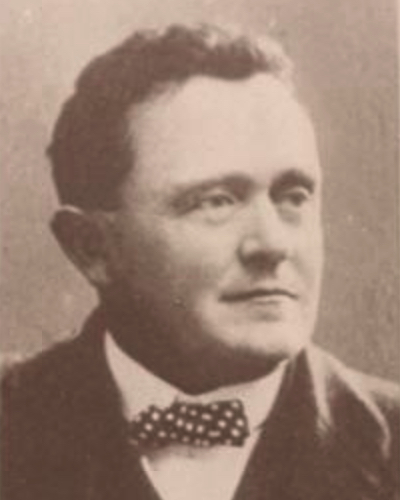

Member of the Virginia Senate from the 21st district
- In office December 1, 1897 – January 10, 1906
- Preceded by: William I. Jordan
- Succeeded by: Hiram O. Kerns

Personal details
- Born: William Peter Barksdale; March 6, 1865
- Died: April 22, 1908 (aged 43)
- Party: Democratic

William Peter Barksdale (March 6, 1865 – April 22, 1908) was an American politician who served as a member of the Virginia Senate.

Senate of Virginia
| Preceded by William I. Jordan | Virginia Senator for the 21st District; 1897–1906 | Succeeded by Hiram O. Kerns |
