= Irwin Lee Potter =

American politician (1909–1983)

Chair of the Virginia Republican Party
- In office July 21, 1956 – April 13, 1962
- Preceded by: S. Floyd Landreth
- Succeeded by: Horace E. Henderson

Personal details
- Born: October 5, 1909 Tower City, Pennsylvania, U.S.
- Died: February 21, 1983 (aged 73) Arlington, Virginia, U.S.
- Party: Republican
- Spouse: Dulcie Horner
- Children: 1
- Education: Southeastern University

Irwin Lee Potter (October 5, 1909 – February 21, 1983) was an American politician from Virginia who served as Chairman of the Virginia Republican Party from 1956 to 1962.

== Early life ==
Potter was born on October 5, 1909, in Tower City, Pennsylvania, the son of H. Stewart and Emma W. Potter. He was reared in Northern Virginia. He attended school at Southeastern University where he received his degree in accounting and business administration.

== Political career ==
Potter served as Arlington County Republican Chairman from 1948 to 1950. In 1949, he was a candidate for the Virginia General Assembly. In 1952 and 1954, he served as campaign manager for Joel Broyhill. He was elected state chairman on July 21, 1956, defeating Lester S. Parsons. On July 1, 1957, he was appointed by chair of the Republican National Committee, Meade Alcorn, as director of "Operation Dixie" in an effort to build the Republican Party in the South. He resigned as state chair on April 13, 1962.

== Personal life ==
He was married to his wife, Dulcie Horner. They had one son, Alan Lee Potter. He died on February 21, 1983, aged 73 due to a ruptured aorta in Arlington, Virginia.
