= Marshall B. Booker =

American politician (1880–1940)

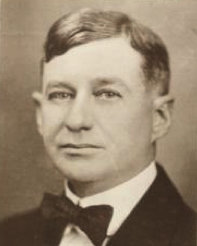

Member of the Virginia Senate from the 10th district
- In office January 9, 1924 – January 11, 1928
- Preceded by: Harry F. Byrd
- Succeeded by: James S. Easley

Member of the Virginia Senate from the 21st district
- In office August 13, 1919 – January 9, 1924
- Preceded by: James T. Lacy
- Succeeded by: R. Holman Willis

13th Clerk of the Senate of Virginia
- In office January 8, 1908 – March 15, 1912
- Preceded by: Joseph Button
- Succeeded by: Orion V. Hanger

Member of the Virginia House of Delegates from Halifax County
- In office January 10, 1906 – January 7, 1908 Serving with James A. Glenn
- Preceded by: Henry A. Edmondson
- Succeeded by: Joseph Stebbins, Jr.

Personal details
- Born: November 26, 1880 Gloucester, Virginia, U.S.
- Died: July 8, 1940 (aged 59) Halifax, Virginia, U.S.
- Party: Democratic
- Spouse: Sallie Edmunds
- Education: Richmond College; University of Virginia
- Profession: lawyer, politician

Marshall Burnskill Booker (November 26, 1880 – July 8, 1940) was an American Democratic lawyer and politician who served in both houses of the Virginia General Assembly representing Halifax County, Virginia.

== Early life and education ==
Born in the Abingdon district of Gloucester County, Virginia, to the former Fanny Eubank, the wife of Rev. George M. Booker, who had served as chaplain of the 48th Virginia Infantry as well as captain of Company H of the 58th Virginia Infantry in the Civil War. The family included two elder brothers George Booker Jr. (b. 1872 and who became a clergyman like his father) and Frank (b. 1873 who became a physician). Although some siblings died as children, the family would later include a sister Fannie Munford Booker (b. 1884). Young Marshall Booker received an education appropriate to his class before traveling to Richmond for undergraduate studies at the Richmond College. He then traveled to Charlottesville, and earned a law degree from the University of Virginia School of Law. In 1900 he was a student and boarded at a tavern operated by W.H. Clay in Halifax County, as did his elder brother Frank (by then a physician).

== Career ==
Booker was active in the local Democratic party, and rose to become chairman of Halifax county's Democratic executive committee. In 1906, Halifax voters elected Booker as one of their representatives to the Virginia House of Delegates and he served alongside James A. Glenn, but neither man was re-elected two years later. Thus, after a single term in that part-time position, Booker accepted a position as clerk of the Virginia Senate and served until 1912. He resigned in 1912 to become Commonwealth's Attorney for Halifax County. Halifax voters elected him to the Virginia Senate for the extra session of the 1919 session, and re-elected him (despite the district number changing in 1924 following census reapportionment) until 1930, when fellow lawyer James Stone Easley (who had served nearly a decade as Halifax's Commonwealth attorney) replaced him. Booker also attended the Democratic National Conventions in St. Louis and in Chicago.

== Personal life ==
He married Sallie Edmunds, 11 years his junior and who survived him, whose father Henry Edmunds had twice representated Halifax County in the Virginia House of Delegates following the Civil War, and whose grandfather John Richard Edmunds (1812-1873) had owned the Redfield plantation in Halifax County and represented the county part-time in the House of Delegates for more nearly three decades. Her uncle Paul Carrington Edmunds (1836-1899), who had become a lawyer in Missouri before serving as a CSA lieutenant in the Civil War, represented Halifax County and adjacent areas of Southside Virginia in the Virginia Senate before becoming a Congressman (1889-1895). Although they had no children who survived, Booker was active in the Methodist Church as well as in the Masons. In 1920 the couple rented a house in Halifax, and lived with her sister Mildred (a stenographer), and a servant who cooked.

== Death and legacy ==
In the last decade of his life, Booker resumed his general legal practice. He died of a heart attack on July 8 1940, at age 59 in Halifax, Virginia, and his wife survived him by less than a month. Both are buried in the Edmunds family plot at historic St. John's Episcopal Church in Halifax.

Virginia House of Delegates
Preceded by Henry A. Edmondson	Virginia Delegate for Halifax County; 1906–1908; Served alongside: James A. Glenn	Succeeded by Joseph Stebbins, Jr.
Senate of Virginia
Preceded by Joseph Button	Clerk of the Senate; 1908–1912	Succeeded by Orion V. Hanger
Preceded by James T. Lacy	Virginia Senator for the 21st District; 1919–1924	Succeeded by R. Holman Willis
Preceded by Harry F. Byrd	Virginia Senator for the 10th District; 1924–1930	Succeeded by James S. Easley
