= Hiram O. Kerns =

American politician

Member of the Virginia Senate from the 21st district
- In office January 10, 1906 – January 8, 1908
- Preceded by: William P. Barksdale
- Succeeded by: Henry A. Edmondson

Personal details
- Born: Hiram Oscar Kerns; December 14, 1853 Paradise, Pennsylvania, U.S.
- Died: June 27, 1931 (aged 77) Danville, Virginia, U.S.
- Party: Democratic
- Spouse: Julia Florence Trevillian

Hiram Oscar Kerns (December 14, 1853 – June 27, 1931) was an American Democratic politician who served as a member of the Virginia Senate, representing Halifax County from 1906 to 1908.

He was Grand Master of the Grand Lodge of Virginia from 1901 to 1902.

== Early life ==
Kerns was born in Lancaster County, Pennsylvania in 1852, while his mother was visiting her family in Paradise Township. He was later raised in Gloucester County, Virginia and attended Gloucester Academy until he was old enough to help his father. In 1875 he married Julia Trevilian who was born and raised in Gloucester. He was 23 and she was 18. They had twelve children.

Kerns learned the milling trade from his father and worked as a miller himself for a short time in Gloucester County. He then went to work for the county as a tax collector. It appears that he then left the Gloucester area and moved to Knoxville, Tennessee where he managed a hotel. In 1880 he moved his family to Sutherlin, Virginia, in Halifax County. Sometime after the Civil War had visited Sutherlin to help his father Maris Vernon Kerns, they were contracted as millwrights to install updated machinery in Sutherlin Grist mill for Confederate Army major William Sutherlin, thus converting the mill into a roller mill that would make high quality flour. Kerns purchased the foundry located next to the mill from major Sutherlin. In 1895 Kerns purchased the mill from the present owner John Anderson. Kerns operated the mill until 1916 when his home burned in Sutherlin. He then turned the day-to-day operation over to his son Hiram Oscar Jr. (Oscar). Oscar and his brother Trevilian Agustus Kerns purchased the mill from their father.

== Career ==
Kerns became president of the South Boston Savings Bank and later participated in the forming of a new bank, The American National Bank of Danville, where he also served as president. He also served as president of the Sons of the Virginia 5th Cavalry, and formed the Virginia Tobacco Growers Association to help ensure tobacco farmers receive fair prices. He was elected and served a term in the Virginia Senate. He was also active in the Masons, where he was twice elected Grand Mason of Virginia.

Kerns donated land and materials for the building of Sutherlin Methodist Episcopal Church, which began in 1892. He died in 1931 and was buried with full Masonic Honors in the cemetery behind the church he helped build. Shortly after his death the church was renamed Kerns Memorial Methodist Church.

Senate of Virginia
Preceded by William P. Barksdale	Virginia Senator for the 21st District; 1906–1908	Succeeded by Henry A. Edmondson
