= Robert J. Tuck =

American politician

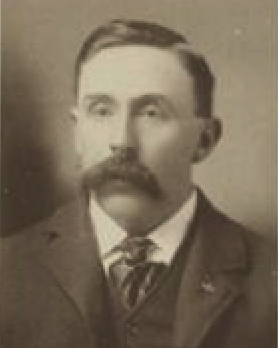

Member of the Virginia House of Delegates from Halifax County
- In office December 6, 1899 – December 4, 1901 Serving with James T. Lacy
- Preceded by: William M. Palmer
- Succeeded by: Henry A. Edmondson

Personal details
- Born: Robert James Tuck; November 23, 1863 Halifax County, Virginia, U.S.
- Died: October 2, 1930 (aged 66) South Boston, Virginia, U.S.
- Party: Democratic
- Spouse: Virginia Susan Fitts
- Children: 11, including William

Robert James Tuck (November 23, 1863 – October 2, 1930) was an American Democratic politician who served as a member of the Virginia House of Delegates, representing Halifax County for one term, from 1899 to 1901. He was the father of William Munford Tuck, who served as Governor of Virginia from 1946 to 1950.

Virginia House of Delegates
Preceded by William M. Palmer	Virginia Delegate for Halifax County; 1899–1901; Served alongside: James T. Lacy	Succeeded by Henry A. Edmondson
