= Horace Hall Edwards =

American politician (1902–1987)

Horace H. Edwards

58th Mayor of Richmond, Virginia
- In office 1946–1948
- Preceded by: William C. Herbert
- Succeeded by: W. Stirling King

Member of the Virginia House of Delegates from Richmond City
- In office January 10, 1934 – January 10, 1940
- Preceded by: J. Vaughan Gary
- Succeeded by: Walter L. Hopkins

Personal details
- Born: Horace Hall Edwards; August 21, 1902 Isle of Wight, Virginia, U.S.
- Died: January 27, 1987 (aged 84) Richmond, Virginia, U.S.
- Resting place: Hollywood Cemetery
- Spouse: Mary Lynch (m. 1926)
- Children: 3
- Education: University of Richmond (LLB)
- Occupation: Politician; lawyer

Horace Hall Edwards (August 21, 1902 – January 27, 1987) was an American politician. He served as a member of the Virginia House of Delegates, as mayor of Richmond, Virginia, and was a candidate for governor of Virginia in 1949.

== Early life ==
Horace Hall Edwards was born on August 21, 1902, in Isle of Wight County, Virginia, to Hope (née Hall) and Samuel H. Edwards. He graduated from the University of Richmond with a Bachelor of Laws in 1926.

== Career ==
Edwards was a Democrat and campaigned for presidential candidate Al Smith in 1928. After, he practiced law in the Richmond area. In 1932, he formed a law practice with John S. Davenport that later became Mays, Valentine, Davenport and Moore. In 1933, he was elected to the Virginia House of Delegates, serving three terms. In 1938, he was appointed as city attorney. He remained in that role for 10 years and became an expert on annexation and taxation law. During his tenure, he helped Richmond win annexation cases against Henrico and Chesterfield counties.

Edwards was state campaign manager for Franklin Roosevelt in 1938. He served as chairman of the Democratic Party's State Central Committee starting in 1940. On September 11, 1946, he was elected by the two-chamber council as mayor of Richmond, following the death in office of William C. Herbert. Edwards was the last one who served as mayor of Richmond under the city's bicameral system of government before a charter change transitioned the city to a council-manager form of government. He served in that position until his resignation in 1948. He resigned so he could enter a four-candidate race for the 1949 Democratic nomination for governor. He ran on a platform for more and better schools and better pay for teachers. He proposed a 2 percent sales tax to finance improvements to public education. In the Democratic primary, Edwards finished third with only 15 percent of the vote. On January 1, 1954, he was elected by the nine-member council as Richmond's second city manager, replacing Sherwood Reeder. He served as city manager for 13 years and factions in the city council tried to oust him three times in 1957, 1958 and 1963. During his tenure as city manager, he pushed the construction and planning of the Health-Safety-Welfare Building, construction of a jail and detention center and appropriated money for new Ninth Street and Acca railroad yard bridges. He resigned in 1967 and then worked as special counsel to the city in its annexation suit against Chesterfield County.

Edwards was president of the Virginia chapter of the International City Managers' Association and the Virginia Municipal League. He was also chairman of Richmond's planning commission. In 1970, he was elected as regional vice president of the Virginia Municipal League. He also returned to his law practice with the firm Mays, Valentine, Davenport and Moore. He was president of the National Institute of Municipal Law Officers. He was a member of multiple fraternities and societies, Phi Kappa Sigma, Delta Theta Phi, Tau Kappa Alpha and Omicron Delta Kappa.

== Personal life ==
Edwards married Mary Lynch in 1926. They had a son and two daughters, Horace H. Jr., Mary Ann and Helen Esther. He lived at 1406 Palmyra Avenue in Richmond. He was a member of the First Baptist Church. His hobbies were fishing and hunting.

Edwards had a stroke in 1985. He died on January 27, 1987, at a hospital in Richmond. He was buried at Hollywood Cemetery.

== Awards ==
In 1963, Edwards was honored by the International City Managers' Association for "contributions to the advancement of the city manager profession". In 1970, the association gave him a service award. In 1967, he received an honorary Doctor of Laws degree from the University of Richmond.
