= Henry A. Edmondson =

American politician

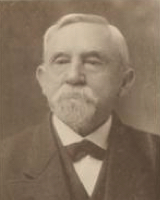

Member of the Virginia Senate from the 21st district
- In office January 8, 1908 – January 12, 1916
- Preceded by: Hiram O. Kerns
- Succeeded by: James T. Lacy

Member of the Virginia House of Delegates from Halifax County
- In office December 4, 1901 – January 10, 1906 Serving with James T. Lacy
- Preceded by: Robert J. Tuck
- Succeeded by: Marshall B. Booker

Personal details
- Born: Henry Archer Edmondson; October 20, 1833 Halifax, Virginia, U.S.
- Died: December 28, 1918 (aged 85) Houston, Virginia, U.S.
- Party: Democratic
- Spouse: Sallie Ann Poindexter

Military service
- Allegiance: Confederate States
- Branch/service: Confederate States Army
- Years of service: 1861–1865
- Rank: Major
- Unit: 53rd Virginia Infantry
- Battles/wars: American Civil War

Henry Archer Edmondson (October 20, 1833 – December 28, 1918) was an American Democratic politician who served as a member of the Virginia Senate and Virginia House of Delegates, representing his native Halifax County.

During the American Civil War, he was a major in the 53rd Virginia Infantry of the Confederate States Army. He was wounded in the Battle of Gettysburg, where he was shot in the chin during Pickett's Charge. He always wore a goatee to hide the scars following this injury.

After the war, Major Edmondson owned a tobacco warehouse in South Boston, Virginia and became a successful businessman and community leader. He worked for reconciliation and stated that the Civil War was "all a big mistake", according to those who knew him in his later years.

Major Edmondson also supported Isaac Edmundson's successful campaign for state office. Isaac Edmundson had been Major Edmondson's enslaved "body servant" during the Civil War, and worked as a barber in Halifax, Virginia after the war. He was one of the first Black representatives to serve in the Virginia legislature.

Major Edmondson and his wife Sally Ann Poindexter were the parents of twelve children. They and some of their children are buried in St. John's Episcopal Church Cemetery in Halifax, Virginia.

Virginia House of Delegates
Preceded by Robert J. Tuck	Virginia Delegate for Halifax County; 1901–1906; Served alongside: James T. Lacy	Succeeded by Marshall B. Booker
Senate of Virginia
Preceded by Hiram O. Kerns	Virginia Senator for the 21st District; 1908–1916	Succeeded by James T. Lacy
