= 1945 Los Angeles mayoral election =

- April 3, 1945
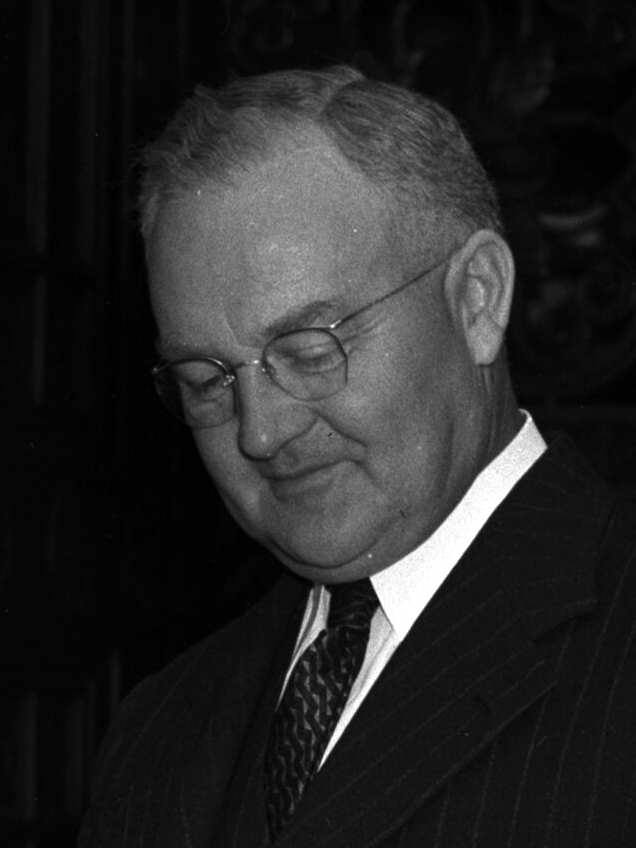

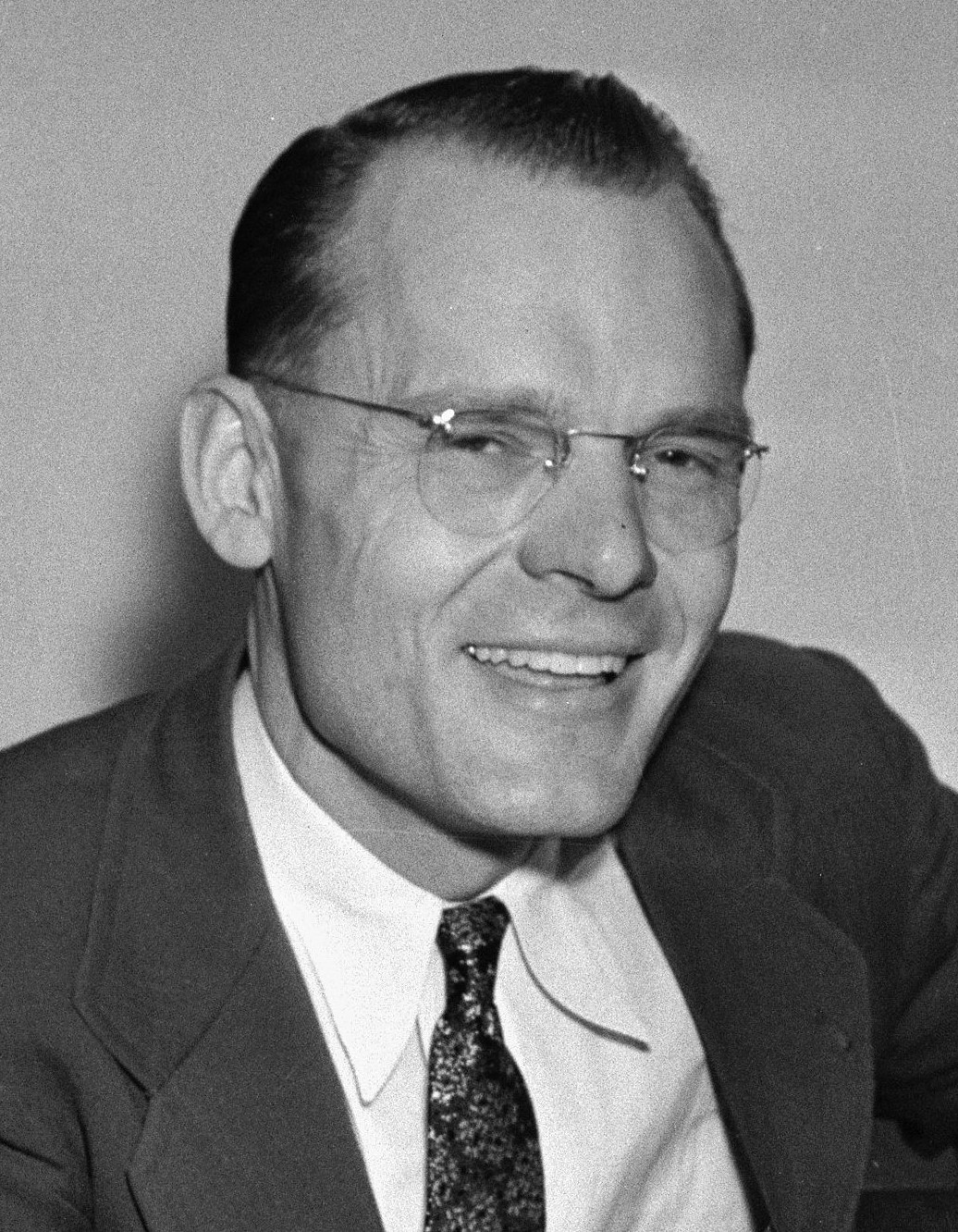

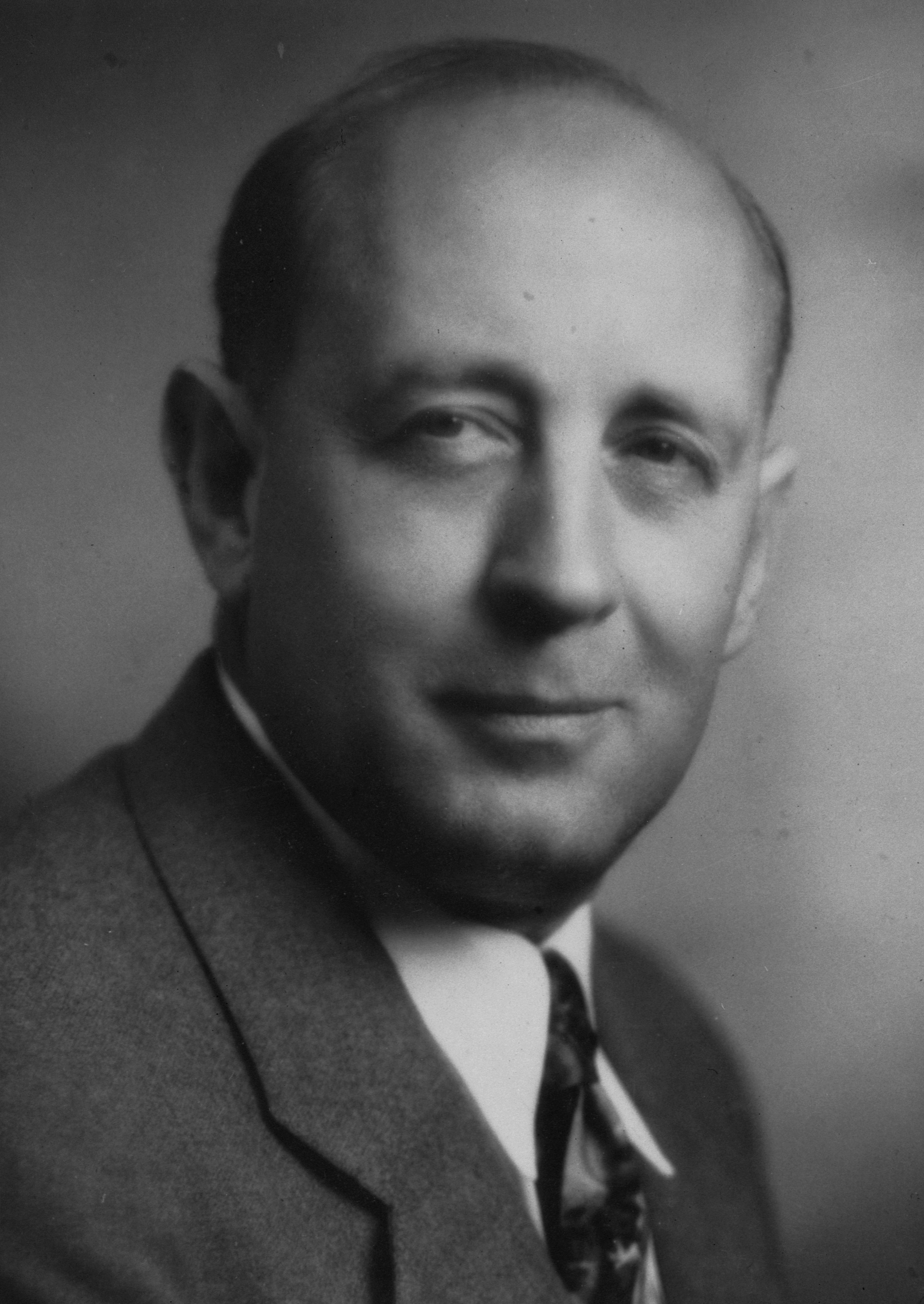
Candidate	Fletcher Bowron	Clifford Clinton	Roger Jessup
Popular vote	146,323	51,071	33,940
Percentage	53.91%	18.82%	12.50%
Mayor before election
Fletcher Bowron
Elected Mayor
Fletcher Bowron

The 1945 Los Angeles mayoral election took place on April 3, 1945. Incumbent Fletcher Bowron was re-elected outright with minimal opposition. The candidates challenging Bowron included restaurateur Clifford Clinton, city councilmember Ira J. McDonald, and former State Assemblymember Sam Yorty.

Municipal elections in California, including Mayor of Los Angeles, are officially nonpartisan; candidates' party affiliations do not appear on the ballot.

== Results ==
Los Angeles mayoral general election, April 3, 1945
Candidate	Votes	%
Fletcher Bowron (incumbent)	146,323	53.91
Clifford Clinton	51,071	18.82
Roger Jessup	33,940	12.50
Ira J. McDonald	12,674	4.67
Sam Yorty	10,393	3.83
Anthony P. Entenza	10,301	3.80
Oliver K. Jones	2,333	0.86
Dolores Gunn	1,273	0.47
Fred Dyster	789	0.29
James L. Hill	645	0.24
Myra Tanner Weiss	580	0.21
Leland E. Zeman	506	0.19
George R. Martin	366	0.14
Harley Mosteller	233	0.09
Total votes	271,427	100.00
