= James T. Lacy =

American politician

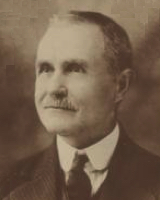

Member of the Virginia Senate from the 21st district
- In office January 12, 1916 – March 1919
- Preceded by: Henry A. Edmondson
- Succeeded by: Marshall B. Booker

Member of the Virginia House of Delegates from Halifax County
- In office December 6, 1899 – January 10, 1906 Serving with Robert J. Tuck (1899–1901); Henry A. Edmondson (1901–1906)
- Preceded by: William O. Lovelace
- Succeeded by: James A. Glenn

Personal details
- Born: James Thomas Lacy; January 8, 1857 Halifax, Virginia, U.S.
- Died: June 18, 1939 (aged 82) Scottsburg, Virginia, U.S.
- Party: Democratic
- Spouse: Ada Crews

James Thomas Lacy (January 8, 1857 – June 18, 1939) was an American Democratic politician who represented Halifax County in the Virginia Senate and Virginia House of Delegates. After being elected to the state senate in 1915, he resigned in March 1919 to become clerk of the Halifax County circuit court.

Virginia House of Delegates
Preceded by William O. Lovelace	Virginia Delegate for Halifax County; 1899–1906; Served alongside: Robert J. Tuck, Henry A. Edmondson	Succeeded by James A. Glenn
Senate of Virginia
Preceded by Henry A. Edmondson	Virginia Senator for the 21st District; 1916–1919	Succeeded by Marshall B. Booker
