= S. Floyd Landreth =

American politician (1885–1977)

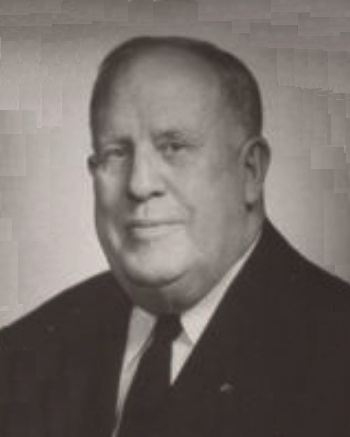

Member of the Virginia Senate from the 14th district
- In office January 12, 1944 – January 8, 1964
- Preceded by: B. Charles Vaughn
- Succeeded by: James Clinton Turk

Chair of the Virginia Republican Party
- In office June 1, 1952 – June 29, 1956
- Preceded by: Robert H. Woods
- Succeeded by: Irwin Lee Potter

Personal details
- Born: March 27, 1885 Carroll County, Virginia, U.S.
- Died: October 2, 1977 (aged 92) Galax, Virginia, U.S.
- Resting place: Felts Memorial Cemetery, Galax, Virginia
- Party: Republican
- Spouse: Lola Evelyn Lintecum (m. 1914)
- Children: Kathryn Franke
- Education: Washington and Lee University
- Profession: Attorney at law

Sydney Floyd Landreth (March 27, 1885 – October 2, 1977) was an American lawyer, banker and Republican politician from Galax, Virginia who represented the 14th state senatorial district for two decades. He ran unsuccessfully for Governor of Virginia in 1945.

== Early life and education ==
Landreth liked to claim he was born in a log cabin on March 27, 1885 in a community then known as Dipsey in Carroll County, Virginia. His father, Rev. James Jonathan Landreth (1861–1926; minister at the local Disciples of Christ Church that Landreth would attend the rest of his life) and his wife, the former Missouri Clementine Phillippi (1864–1939), also had six daughters. S. Floyd Landreth graduated from the local Woodlawn High School and then attended Washington and Lee University further up the Shenandoah Valley in Lexington, Virginia. He graduated in 1910 and began practicing law in his native Carroll County. He married Lola Lintecum and they had one daughter, Kathryn Franke, who also bore a son before her father's death.

== Politics and career ==
Landreth practiced law at the Carroll County Courthouse in Hillsville, as well as in adjoining counties. In 1912, while still a young deputy clerk, he witnessed a courtroom shootout between convicted defendant Floyd Allen and his family and law enforcement, which wounded Landreth's boss but killed the judge, prosecutor, sheriff, jury foreman, and later a witness, as well as wounded seven spectators. Landreth participated as special prosecutor in the trials of two of the shooters, which were moved to Wytheville because of inflamed feelings in Carroll County.

Landreth also farmed and was president of the First National Bank of Galax for four decades. He served on the local Chamber of Commerce, as well as the Retail Merchants Association. He was active in his church (on a national level) as well as with the Masons, Rotary Club, Moose, Boy Scouts and various bar associations. He was also a trustee of Lynchburg College.

He unsuccessfully ran for Governor of Virginia in 1945, receiving only about half the number of votes of Byrd Organization Democrat William M. Tuck. Still, garnering 30% of the vote, was far more than previous Republican candidates, and unlike previous Republican candidates, Landreth actually campaigned across Virginia. A decade later, Tuck would become a crucial figure in the Massive Resistance movement to the United States Supreme Court decisions in Brown v. Board of Education.

Landreth was chairman of the state Republican Party in 1952, and greeted President Dwight Eisenhower during his campaign stops in southern Virginia. During the Massive Resistance controversy, Landreth had been one of the token Republicans on both the Gray Commission and later the Perrow Commission, which were both designed to address (or avoid compliance with) Brown. Virginians' upset over Governor Thomas B. Stanley's closing of public schools, as well as census changes and changes in federal law (especially the Voting Rights Act of 1965 which the Democratic Byrd Organization vehemently opposed) eventually led to the revitalization of the state Republican Party and return of two-party democracy to the state with the election of Linwood Holton as Governor before Landreth's death.

== Death and memorials ==
Landreth died at a nursing home in Galax on October 2, 1977. His papers are held by the Library of Virginia.

Party political offices
Preceded by Benjamin Muse	Republican nominee for Governor of Virginia; 1945	Succeeded by Walter Johnson
Senate of Virginia
Preceded by B. Charles Vaughan	Virginia Senate, District 14; 1944–1964	Succeeded by James C. Turk
