= 1945 Colombian parliamentary election =

Parliamentary elections were held in Colombia in February 1945 to elect the Chamber of Representatives. The result was a victory for the Colombian Liberal Party, which won 80 of the 131 seats.

== Results ==
Party	Votes	%	Seats
Colombian Liberal Party	551,224	62.95	80
Colombian Conservative Party	294,237	33.60	47
Social Democratic Party	27,696	3.16	4
Other parties	2,522	0.29	0
Total	875,679	100.00	131
Valid votes	875,679	99.98	
Invalid/blank votes	177	0.02	
Total votes	875,856	100.00	
Registered voters/turnout	2,279,510	38.42	
Source: Nohlen
