= 1945 Virginia gubernatorial election =

- November 6, 1945
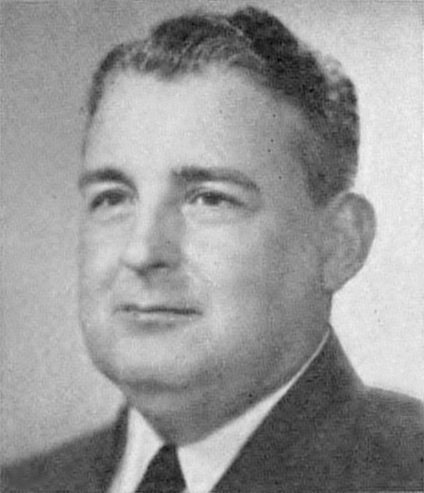

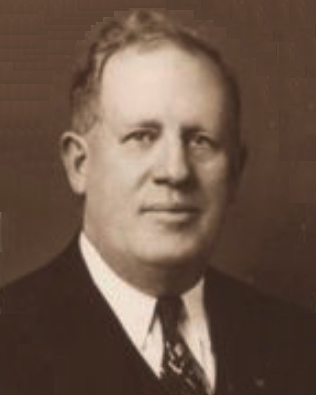
Nominee	William M. Tuck	S. Floyd Landreth
Party	Democratic	Republican
Popular vote	112,355	52,386
Percentage	66.58%	31.04%
- County and independent city results Tuck: 50–60% 60–70% 70–80% 80–90% >90% Landreth: 40–50% 50–60% 60–70% 70–80%
Governor before election
Colgate Darden
Democratic
Elected Governor
William M. Tuck
Democratic

In the 1945 Virginia gubernatorial election, incumbent Governor Colgate Darden, a Democrat, was unable to seek re-election due to term limits. Lieutenant Governor William M. Tuck was nominated by the Democratic Party to run against Republican state senator S. Floyd Landreth.

== Background ==
For the previous four decades Virginia had almost completely disenfranchised its black and poor white populations through the use of a cumulative poll tax and literacy tests. So restricted was suffrage that it has been calculated that a third of Virginia's electorate during the first half of the twentieth century comprised state employees and officeholders. This limited electorate allowed Virginian politics to be controlled for four decades by the Byrd Organization, as progressive "antiorganization" factions were rendered impotent by the inability of almost all their potential electorate to vote. Historical fusion with the “Readjuster” Democrats, defection of substantial proportions of the Northeast-aligned white electorate of the Shenandoah Valley and Southwest Virginia over free silver, and an early move towards a "lily white" Jim Crow party meant Republicans retained a small but permanent number of legislative seats and local offices in the western part of the state. Nevertheless, in gubernatorial elections during this period the Republican vote was mostly in the nature of a protest, and in most elections between 1925 and 1949 turnout was higher in the Democratic primary than the general election.

William M. Tuck had lost out to Darden as the 1941 organization nominee for Governor, but became Lieutenant Governor against perennial anti-organization leader Moss Plunkett. Tuck had beaten Plunkett by four-to-one in the 1941 lieutenant gubernatorial primary with a turnout even lower than usual due to the war, and he would repeat his win in the rematch by a five-to-two majority and carrying all but four counties and three independent cities, although Plunkett campaigned extensive on the failings of the Byrd machine in issues like suffrage, education and health. In the general election, Tuck would also win easily despite the fact that — unlike past GOP nominees — Landreth did significant campaigning.

== Democratic primary ==
=== Candidates ===
- William M. Tuck, Lieutenant Governor from Halifax County
- Moss A. Plunkett, attorney from Roanoke

=== Results ===
1945 Virginia Democratic gubernatorial primary
Party	Candidate	Votes	%	±%
Democratic	William M. Tuck	97,304	70.11%	
Democratic	Moss A. Plunkett	41,484	29.89%	
Majority		55,820	40.22%	
Turnout		138,788	7.71%	
Democratic hold		Swing		

== General election ==
=== Candidates ===
- William M. Tuck, Lieutenant Governor of Virginia (Democratic)
- S. Floyd Landreth, State Senator from Galax (Republican)
- Howard Carwile, Richmond attorney (Independent)

=== Results ===
1945 Virginia gubernatorial election
Party	Candidate	Votes	%	±%
Democratic	William M. Tuck	112,355	66.58%	−14.00%
Republican	S. Floyd Landreth	52,386	31.04%	+13.16%
Independent	Howard Carwile	4,023	2.38%	
Majority		59,969	35.53%	
Turnout		168,764	9.38%	
Democratic hold		Swing		

==== Results by county or independent city ====
1945 Virginia gubernatorial election by county or independent city
	William Munford Tuck Democratic		Sydney Floyd Landreth Republican		Howard Hearnes Carwile Independent		Margin		Total votes cast
	#	%	#	%	#	%	#	%	Total votes cast
Accomack County	1,026	87.47%	133	11.34%	14	1.19%	893	76.13%	1,173
Albemarle County	934	81.50%	170	14.83%	42	3.66%	764	66.67%	1,146
Alleghany County	565	53.25%	465	43.83%	31	2.92%	100	9.43%	1,061
Amelia County	530	81.92%	109	16.85%	8	1.24%	421	65.07%	647
Amherst County	611	85.94%	90	12.66%	10	1.41%	521	73.28%	711
Appomattox County	1,472	95.28%	69	4.47%	4	0.26%	1,403	90.81%	1,545
Arlington County	3,521	66.05%	1,593	29.88%	217	4.07%	1,928	36.17%	5,331
Augusta County	1,135	66.76%	539	31.71%	26	1.53%	596	35.06%	1,700
Bath County	220	64.71%	110	32.35%	10	2.94%	110	32.35%	340
Bedford County	1,125	75.20%	340	22.73%	31	2.07%	785	52.47%	1,496
Bland County	457	47.41%	493	51.14%	14	1.45%	-36	-3.73%	964
Botetourt County	785	54.86%	633	44.23%	13	0.91%	152	10.62%	1,431
Brunswick County	535	94.36%	29	5.11%	3	0.53%	506	89.24%	567
Buchanan County	1,309	51.15%	1,159	45.29%	91	3.56%	150	5.86%	2,559
Buckingham County	481	84.68%	77	13.56%	10	1.76%	404	71.13%	568
Campbell County	937	85.18%	136	12.36%	27	2.45%	801	72.82%	1,100
Caroline County	356	80.18%	83	18.69%	5	1.13%	273	61.49%	444
Carroll County	863	32.73%	1,761	66.78%	13	0.49%	-898	-34.05%	2,637
Charles City County	104	72.73%	35	24.48%	4	2.80%	69	48.25%	143
Charlotte County	1,174	90.66%	95	7.34%	26	2.01%	1,079	83.32%	1,295
Chesterfield County	706	74.24%	211	22.19%	34	3.58%	495	52.05%	951
Clarke County	332	87.60%	41	10.82%	6	1.58%	291	76.78%	379
Craig County	243	60.45%	150	37.31%	9	2.24%	93	23.13%	402
Culpeper County	951	74.82%	293	23.05%	27	2.12%	658	51.77%	1,271
Cumberland County	320	88.40%	38	10.50%	4	1.10%	282	77.90%	362
Dickenson County	1,473	55.23%	1,127	42.26%	67	2.51%	346	12.97%	2,667
Dinwiddie County	486	89.34%	50	9.19%	8	1.47%	436	80.15%	544
Elizabeth City County	780	78.31%	195	19.58%	21	2.11%	585	58.73%	996
Essex County	261	82.59%	51	16.14%	4	1.27%	210	66.46%	316
Fairfax County	1,613	62.21%	821	31.66%	159	6.13%	792	30.54%	2,593
Fauquier County	853	85.04%	125	12.46%	25	2.49%	728	72.58%	1,003
Floyd County	288	28.74%	708	70.66%	6	0.60%	-420	-41.92%	1,002
Fluvanna County	289	75.65%	85	22.25%	8	2.09%	204	53.40%	382
Franklin County	1,290	71.79%	491	27.32%	16	0.89%	799	44.46%	1,797
Frederick County	508	74.16%	164	23.94%	13	1.90%	344	50.22%	685
Giles County	1,184	59.35%	772	38.70%	39	1.95%	412	20.65%	1,995
Gloucester County	437	83.72%	75	14.37%	10	1.92%	362	69.35%	522
Goochland County	585	85.40%	93	13.58%	7	1.02%	492	71.82%	685
Grayson County	2,785	41.03%	3,942	58.08%	60	0.88%	-1,157	-17.05%	6,787
Greene County	124	56.36%	88	40.00%	8	3.64%	36	16.36%	220
Greensville County	478	88.35%	54	9.98%	9	1.66%	424	78.37%	541
Halifax County	2,746	97.03%	69	2.44%	15	0.53%	2,677	94.59%	2,830
Hanover County	461	72.14%	167	26.13%	11	1.72%	294	46.01%	639
Henrico County	684	67.72%	297	29.41%	29	2.87%	387	38.32%	1,010
Henry County	614	64.97%	295	31.22%	36	3.81%	319	33.76%	945
Highland County	241	59.65%	157	38.86%	6	1.49%	84	20.79%	404
Isle of Wight County	618	85.36%	97	13.40%	9	1.24%	521	71.96%	724
James City County	106	77.94%	28	20.59%	2	1.47%	78	57.35%	136
King and Queen County	141	82.46%	27	15.79%	3	1.75%	114	66.67%	171
King George County	161	71.24%	59	26.11%	6	2.65%	102	45.13%	226
King William County	346	82.78%	54	12.92%	18	4.31%	292	69.86%	418
Lancaster County	375	74.70%	115	22.91%	12	2.39%	260	51.79%	502
Lee County	1,966	58.05%	1,319	38.94%	102	3.01%	647	19.10%	3,387
Loudoun County	1,860	87.69%	228	10.75%	33	1.56%	1,632	76.94%	2,121
Louisa County	751	78.64%	192	20.10%	12	1.26%	559	58.53%	955
Lunenburg County	956	92.10%	61	5.88%	21	2.02%	895	86.22%	1,038
Madison County	250	56.56%	183	41.40%	9	2.04%	67	15.16%	442
Mathews County	335	71.13%	130	27.60%	6	1.27%	205	43.52%	471
Mecklenburg County	867	87.31%	108	10.88%	18	1.81%	759	76.44%	993
Middlesex County	258	80.12%	60	18.63%	4	1.24%	198	61.49%	322
Montgomery County	1,264	46.92%	1,383	51.34%	47	1.74%	-119	-4.42%	2,694
Nansemond County	446	89.20%	51	10.20%	3	0.60%	395	79.00%	500
Nelson County	707	87.83%	91	11.30%	7	0.87%	616	76.52%	805
New Kent County	107	75.89%	30	21.28%	4	2.84%	77	54.61%	141
Norfolk County	1,755	80.06%	370	16.88%	67	3.06%	1,385	63.18%	2,192
Northampton County	1,126	94.30%	58	4.86%	10	0.84%	1,068	89.45%	1,194
Northumberland County	307	73.98%	100	24.10%	8	1.93%	207	49.88%	415
Nottoway County	569	86.87%	70	10.69%	16	2.44%	499	76.18%	655
Orange County	435	73.73%	144	24.41%	11	1.86%	291	49.32%	590
Page County	1,618	44.55%	1,926	53.03%	88	2.42%	-308	-8.48%	3,632
Patrick County	961	81.58%	208	17.66%	9	0.76%	753	63.92%	1,178
Pittsylvania County	1,853	85.08%	280	12.86%	45	2.07%	1,573	72.22%	2,178
Powhatan County	215	78.75%	53	19.41%	5	1.83%	162	59.34%	273
Prince Edward County	655	87.68%	71	9.50%	21	2.81%	584	78.18%	747
Prince George County	180	64.75%	83	29.86%	15	5.40%	97	34.89%	278
Prince William County	565	78.58%	140	19.47%	14	1.95%	425	59.11%	719
Princess Anne County	1,083	88.70%	127	10.40%	11	0.90%	956	78.30%	1,221
Pulaski County	1,313	65.58%	678	33.87%	11	0.55%	635	31.72%	2,002
Rappahannock County	348	81.50%	68	15.93%	11	2.58%	280	65.57%	427
Richmond County	211	68.06%	97	31.29%	2	0.65%	114	36.77%	310
Roanoke County	1,256	47.72%	1,328	50.46%	48	1.82%	-72	-2.74%	2,632
Rockbridge County	637	70.54%	254	28.13%	12	1.33%	383	42.41%	903
Rockingham County	1,610	54.45%	1,285	43.46%	62	2.10%	325	10.99%	2,957
Russell County	1,518	61.81%	901	36.69%	37	1.51%	617	25.12%	2,456
Scott County	1,560	44.85%	1,792	51.52%	126	3.62%	-232	-6.67%	3,478
Shenandoah County	1,273	43.36%	1,663	56.64%	0	0.00%	-390	-13.28%	2,936
Smyth County	1,422	39.92%	2,045	57.41%	95	2.67%	-623	-17.49%	3,562
Southampton County	687	89.11%	75	9.73%	9	1.17%	612	79.38%	771
Spotsylvania County	529	84.78%	86	13.78%	9	1.44%	443	70.99%	624
Stafford County	381	71.08%	144	26.87%	11	2.05%	237	44.22%	536
Surry County	297	90.00%	24	7.27%	9	2.73%	273	82.73%	330
Sussex County	482	91.63%	37	7.03%	7	1.33%	445	84.60%	526
Tazewell County	957	51.09%	877	46.82%	39	2.08%	80	4.27%	1,873
Warren County	1,016	76.05%	303	22.68%	17	1.27%	713	53.37%	1,336
Warwick County	378	73.54%	106	20.62%	30	5.84%	272	52.92%	514
Washington County	1,170	50.04%	1,130	48.33%	38	1.63%	40	1.71%	2,338
Westmoreland County	434	85.10%	69	13.53%	7	1.37%	365	71.57%	510
Wise County	1,872	65.78%	921	32.36%	53	1.86%	951	33.42%	2,846
Wythe County	860	44.44%	1,066	55.09%	9	0.47%	-206	-10.65%	1,935
York County	194	73.48%	61	23.11%	9	3.41%	133	50.38%	264
Alexandria City	2,756	74.11%	761	20.46%	202	5.43%	1,995	53.64%	3,719
Bristol City	722	79.78%	175	19.34%	8	0.88%	547	60.44%	905
Buena Vista City	173	68.38%	73	28.85%	7	2.77%	100	39.53%	253
Charlottesville City	644	72.12%	231	25.87%	18	2.02%	413	46.25%	893
Clifton Forge City	438	67.70%	184	28.44%	25	3.86%	254	39.26%	647
Danville City	2,096	82.13%	328	12.85%	128	5.02%	1,768	69.28%	2,552
Fredericksburg City	702	78.00%	173	19.22%	25	2.78%	529	58.78%	900
Hampton City	398	85.22%	57	12.21%	12	2.57%	341	73.02%	467
Harrisonburg City	1,123	66.49%	548	32.45%	18	1.07%	575	34.04%	1,689
Hopewell City	668	72.37%	230	24.92%	25	2.71%	438	47.45%	923
Lynchburg City	1,045	77.06%	279	20.58%	32	2.36%	766	56.49%	1,356
Martinsville City	716	71.03%	241	23.91%	51	5.06%	475	47.12%	1,008
Newport News City	1,037	75.69%	280	20.44%	53	3.87%	757	55.26%	1,370
Norfolk City	2,790	71.03%	967	24.62%	171	4.35%	1,823	46.41%	3,928
Petersburg City	677	81.18%	119	14.27%	38	4.56%	558	66.91%	834
Portsmouth City	2,840	82.77%	442	12.88%	149	4.34%	2,398	69.89%	3,431
Radford City	704	53.91%	583	44.64%	19	1.45%	121	9.26%	1,306
Richmond City	6,507	68.76%	2,579	27.25%	378	3.99%	3,928	41.50%	9,464
Roanoke City	1,865	47.97%	1,932	49.69%	91	2.34%	-67	-1.72%	3,888
South Norfolk City	300	81.74%	56	15.26%	11	3.00%	244	66.49%	367
Staunton City	751	72.35%	278	26.78%	9	0.87%	473	45.57%	1,038
Suffolk City	516	79.26%	126	19.35%	9	1.38%	390	59.91%	651
Williamsburg City	172	77.83%	40	18.10%	9	4.07%	132	59.73%	221
Winchester City	602	76.79%	170	21.68%	12	1.53%	432	55.10%	784
Totals	112,355	66.58%	52,386	31.04%	4,023	2.38%	59,969	35.53%	168,764

Counties and independent cities that flipped from Democratic to Republican

- Bland
- Montgomery
- Page
- Roanoke
- Smyth
- Scott
- Wythe
- Roanoke (independent city)
