= William M. Tuck =

American politician (1896–1983)

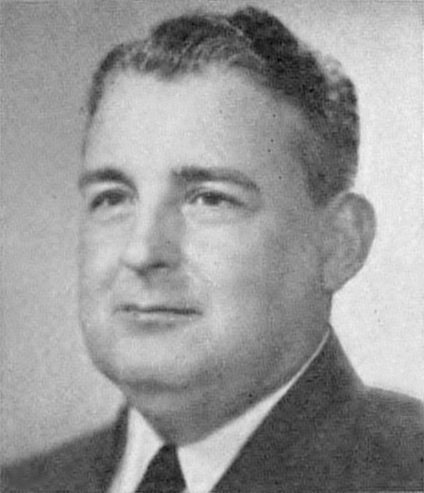

Member of the U.S. House of Representatives from Virginia's 5th district
- In office April 14, 1953 – January 3, 1969
- Preceded by: Thomas B. Stanley
- Succeeded by: Dan Daniel

55th Governor of Virginia
- In office January 16, 1946 – January 18, 1950
- Lieutenant: Lewis Preston Collins II
- Preceded by: Colgate Darden
- Succeeded by: John S. Battle

25th Lieutenant Governor of Virginia
- In office January 21, 1942 – January 16, 1946
- Governor: Colgate Darden
- Preceded by: Saxon W. Holt
- Succeeded by: Lewis Preston Collins II

Member of the Virginia Senate from the 10th district
- In office January 13, 1932 – January 14, 1942
- Preceded by: James Stone Easley
- Succeeded by: James D. Hagood

Member of the Virginia House of Delegates from Halifax County
- In office January 9, 1924 – January 13, 1932; Alongside John Glass, Samuel Adams and A. Owen King
- Preceded by: Daniel W. Owen
- Succeeded by: Roy B. Davis

Personal details
- Born: September 28, 1896 Halifax County, Virginia, U.S.
- Died: June 9, 1983 (aged 86) South Boston, Virginia, U.S.
- Party: Democratic
- Spouse: Eva Ellis Lovelace Dillard (m.1929, died 1975)
- Children: 1 (stepson)
- Parent: Robert J. Tuck (father)
- Education: College of William & Mary; Washington & Lee University
- Profession: Attorney

Military service
- Allegiance: United States
- Branch/service: United States Marine Corps
- Years of service: 1918–1919
- Battles/wars: World War I

William Munford Tuck (September 28, 1896 – June 9, 1983) was an American lawyer and lieutenant in the Byrd Organization, who served as the 55th Governor of Virginia from 1946 to 1950 as a Democrat, and as a U.S. Congressman from 1953 until 1969.

First elected to public office in 1923, Tuck altogether served in Virginia politics for over 40 years. During his tenure as Governor of Virginia, Tuck signed a bill making Virginia a right-to-work state in 1947. Noted for his fiscal conservatism and strong alliance with powerful U.S. Senator Harry F. Byrd, Tuck supported the Massive Resistance plan to defy the U.S. Supreme Court's Brown v. Board ruling, which ordered the desegregation of public schools starting in 1954.

After retiring from politics in 1969, Tuck returned to practicing law in South Boston, Virginia for 10 years before his failing health forced him to retire completely. He died in 1983 at the age of 86.

== Early and Family Life ==
He was the youngest of nine children of Halifax County, Virginia tobacco warehouseman Robert James Tuck (1863–1930) and Virginia Susan Fitts (1860–1909). He was named for his grandfather William Munford Tuck (1832–1899), who served in the Third Virginia Infantry during the American Civil War. Tuck's mother died when he was 13. He attended county schools, Virgilina High School, and Chatham Training School (now Hargrave Military Academy). He attended the College of William and Mary for two years, earning a teacher's certificate and working for a year as a teacher/principal in Northumberland County.

Tuck then enlisted in the U.S. Marine Corps and served from 1917 to 1919, including a deployment in the Caribbean. Tuck returned to attend law school at the Washington and Lee University School of Law, graduating in 1921. In 1929 he married widow (and former schoolteacher) Eva Lovelace Dillard (1891–1975), to whom he remained married until her death in 1975, raising her son Lester Layne (L.L.) Dillard Jr. as his own.

== Career ==
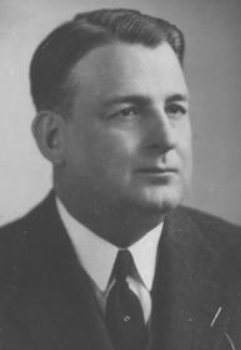
Tuck as Governor of Virginia in 1946

Upon being admitted to Virginia bar, Tuck maintained a private legal practice in Halifax for decades, eventually with his stepson L.L. Dillard.

His career as an elected official began in 1923, when Halifax County voters elected Tuck as their delegate (a part-time position) to the Virginia General Assembly. He was re-elected once but declined to run for re-election in 1929, citing the need to grow his legal business to support his new family. However, when his elected successor died, Tuck was drafted in 1930 and served the remainder of the term. He was then elected to the Virginia Senate in 1931, where he became a friend of U.S. Senator Harry F. Byrd, a former governor. During the national New Deal, state Senator Tuck worked to repeal Prohibition and sponsored new child labor laws, as well as an unemployment compensation system, old age assistance and jail reforms. He also helped develop the state park system.

In 1941, Tuck sought statewide office, but Senator Byrd slated Colgate Darden to run for Governor of Virginia, so Tuck was slated for and won election as the 25th Lieutenant Governor of Virginia. He served from 1942 to 1946 under Governor Darden, and gained visibility throughout the Commonwealth. Tuck defeated his Republican opponent, S. Floyd Landreth by a 2 to 1 margin and won election as governor.

As governor from 1946 to 1950, Tuck demonstrated his fiscal conservatism as a Dixiecrat by reorganizing state government and enacting a right-to-work law. He also created a state water pollution control agency, helped reform state schools and mental hospitals, as well as constructed roads. Governor Tuck gained national exposure, however, for labor unrest in his home state. He worked with Senator Harry Byrd to oppose President Harry Truman, although a fellow Democrat, especially Truman's plan to establish a Fair Employment Practices Commission. Once, as governor, Tuck drafted workers of the Virginia Electric Power Company into the state's national guard to avoid a threatened strike in an unionization effort. Transportation and coal also experienced labor unrest.

Tuck's resumption of legal practice in South Boston after his governorship proved short-lived, for he rose within the Byrd Organization. In 1953 Tuck won election as a Democrat to U.S. Congress vacated by Thomas Bahnson Stanley who had resigned to run for Governor of Virginia. A militant segregationist, Congressman Tuck opposed most major items of civil rights legislation during the 1950s and 1960s. Like U.S. Senator Harry F. Byrd, Tuck promised "massive resistance" to the Supreme Court's 1954 and 1955 decisions banning segregation, Brown v. Board of Education, and helped draft the Stanley Plan—a series of state laws designed to legally avoid Brown, most of which were soon declared unconstitutional. Tuck was a signatory to the 1956 Southern Manifesto. Tuck voted against the Civil Rights Acts of 1957, the Civil Rights Acts of 1960, the Civil Rights Acts of1964, and the Civil Rights Acts of 1968 as well as the 24th Amendment to the U.S. Constitution and the Voting Rights Act of 1965. He was a member of the U.S. House of Representative's Committee on Un-American Activities (HUAC).

He was a delegate to Democratic National Conventions of 1948 and 1952, and in 1967 announced he would not seek reelection to Congress, citing health problems. He remained a power broker in the state for years. He retired from his law practice in South Boston in 1979, after suffering a stroke.

== Legacy ==
Virginia named highway 58 in Halifax County after Tuck, and elected a historical marker in his memory.

His personal papers, including papers from his time as congressman and governor, are held by the Special Collections Research Center at the College of William & Mary. His executive papers from his time as governor are held by the Library of Virginia.

His birthplace and home Buckshoal Farm was listed on the National Register of Historic Places in 1987.

== Electoral history ==
- 1945; Tuck was elected Governor of Virginia with 66.57% of the vote, defeating Republican Sidney Floyd Landreth and Independent Howard Hearnes Carwile.
- 1953; Tuck was elected to the U.S. House of Representatives with 57.81% of the vote in a special election, defeating Republican Lorne R. Campbell.
- 1954; Tuck was re-elected unopposed.
- 1956; Tuck was re-elected unopposed.
- 1958; Tuck was re-elected unopposed.
- 1960; Tuck was re-elected unopposed.
- 1962; Tuck was re-elected unopposed.
- 1964; Tuck was re-elected with 63.47% of the vote, defeating Republican Robert L. Gilliam.
- 1966; Tuck was re-elected with 56.18% of the vote, defeating Republican Gilliam.

Political offices
Preceded by Colgate Darden	Governor of Virginia; 1946–1950	Succeeded by John S. Battle
Preceded by Saxon Winston Holt	Lieutenant Governor of Virginia; 1942–1946	Succeeded by Lewis Preston Collins II
U.S. House of Representatives
Preceded by Thomas B. Stanley	Member of the U.S. House of Representatives from Virginia's 5th congressional district 1953–1969	Succeeded by W. C. "Dan" Daniel
