= List of new members of the 98th United States Congress =

The 98th United States Congress began on January 3, 1983. There were four new senators (one Democrat, three Republicans) and 79 new representatives (56 Democrats, 23 Republicans) at the start of the first session. Additionally, two senators (one Democrat, one Republican) and nine representatives (six Democrats, three Republicans) took office on various dates in order to fill vacancies during the 98th Congress before it ended on January 3, 1985.

Due to redistricting after the 1980 census, 20 representatives were elected from newly established congressional districts. One representative-elect, Jack Swigert, died before taking office.

== Senate ==
=== Took office January 3, 1983 ===
State	Image	Senator	Seniority	Switched party	Prior background	Birth year	Ref
California		Pete Wilson (R)	2nd (98th overall)	No; Open seat; replaced S. I. Hayakawa (R)	Mayor of San Diego; California State Assembly; U.S. Marine Corps First Lieutenant	1933	
Nevada		Chic Hecht (R)	4th (100th overall)	Yes; Defeated Howard Cannon (D)	Nevada Senate	1928	
New Mexico		Jeff Bingaman (D)	3rd (99th overall)	Yes; Defeated Harrison Schmitt (R)	Attorney General of New Mexico; U.S. Army Reserve	1943	
Virginia		Paul Trible (R)	1st (97th overall)	Yes; Open seat; replaced Harry F. Byrd Jr. (I)	U.S. House of Representatives (Note: Elected to the 95th Congress, serving from 1977 to 1983 in the Virginia's 1st congressional district.); Essex County Commonwealth's Attorney	1946	

=== Took office during the 98th Congress ===
State	Image	Senator	Took office	Switched party	Prior background	Birth year	Ref
Washington		Daniel J. Evans (R)	September 8, 1983	Yes; Appointed; replaced Henry M. Jackson (D)	President of Evergreen State College; Governor of Washington; Washington House of Representatives; U.S. Navy Ensign	1925	
Massachusetts		John Kerry (D)	January 2, 1985	No; Open seat; replaced Paul Tsongas (D)	Lieutenant Governor of Massachusetts; U.S. Navy Lieutenant	1943	

== House of Representatives ==
=== Took office January 3, 1983 ===
District	Representative	Switched party	Prior background	Birth year	Ref
Alabama 6	Ben Erdreich (D)	No	County Commissioner	1938	
Arizona 1	John McCain (R)	No	U.S. Navy Captain	1936	
Arizona 5	James F. McNulty Jr. (D)	New seat	State Senator	1925	
California 1	Douglas H. Bosco (D)	Yes	State Assemblyman	1946	
California 6	Barbara Boxer (D)	No	County Supervisor	1940	
California 12	Ed Zschau (R)	No	Educator	1940	
California 18	Richard H. Lehman (D)	New seat	State Assemblyman	1948	
California 26	Howard Berman (D)	New seat	State Assemblyman	1941	
California 27	Mel Levine (D)	Yes	State Assemblyman	1943	
California 34	Esteban Torres (D)	New seat	U.S. Ambassador to UNESCO	1930	
California 37	Al McCandless (R)	New seat	County Supervisor	1927	
California 43	Ron Packard (R)	No	Mayor of Carlsbad	1931	
California 44	Jim Bates (D)	New seat	County Supervisor	1941	
Connecticut 3	Bruce Morrison (D)	Yes	Lawyer	1944	
Connecticut 6	Nancy Johnson (R)	Yes	State Senator	1935	
Delaware at-large	Tom Carper (D)	Yes	Delaware State Treasurer	1947	
Florida 6	Buddy MacKay (D)	New seat	State Senator	1933	
Florida 9	Michael Bilirakis (R)	New seat	Lawyer	1930	
Florida 12	Tom Lewis (R)	No	State Senator	1924	
Florida 13	Connie Mack III (R)	New seat	Businessman	1940	
Florida 16	Lawrence J. Smith (D)	New seat	State Representative	1941	
Georgia 1	Lindsay Thomas (D)	No	Investment banker	1943	
Georgia 3	Richard Ray (D)	No	Mayor of Perry	1927	
Georgia 8	J. Roy Rowland (D)	No	State Representative	1926	
Illinois 5	Bill Lipinski (D)	No	City Alderman	1937	
Illinois 17	Lane Evans (D)	Yes	Attorney	1951	
Illinois 20	Dick Durbin (D)	Yes	Lawyer	1944	
Indiana 6	Dan Burton (R)	New seat	State Senator	1938	
Indiana 8	Frank McCloskey (D)	Yes	Mayor of Bloomington	1939	
Kansas 2	Jim Slattery (D)	Yes	State Representative	1948	
Maine 1	John R. McKernan Jr. (R)	No	State Representative	1948	
Michigan 6	Milton Robert Carr (D)	Yes	U.S. Representative (Note: Previously elected to the 94th Congress, serving from 1975 to 1981.)	1943	
Michigan 17	Sander Levin (D)	No	State Senator	1931	
Minnesota 1	Tim Penny (DFL)	Yes	State Senator	1951	
Minnesota 6	Gerry Sikorski (DFL)	Yes	State Senator	1948	
Mississippi 2	Webb Franklin (R)	Yes	Judicial Court Judge	1941	
Missouri 5	Alan Wheat (D)	No	State Representative	1951	
Nevada 1	Harry Reid (D)	New seat	Lieutenant Governor of Nevada	1939	
Nevada 2	Barbara Vucanovich (R)	Yes	Congressional staffer	1921	
New Jersey 9	Robert Torricelli (D)	Yes	Attorney	1951	
New Mexico 3	Bill Richardson (D)	New seat	Congressional staffer	1947	
New York 3	Robert J. Mrazek (D)	Yes	County Legislator	1945	
New York 11	Edolphus Towns (D)	No	Professor	1934	
New York 12	Major Owens (D)	No	State Senator	1936	
New York 25	Sherwood Boehlert (R)	No	County Executive	1936	
North Carolina 2	Tim Valentine (D)	No	State Representative	1926	
North Carolina 6	Charles Robin Britt (D)	Yes	Lawyer	1942	
North Carolina 11	James M. Clarke (D)	Yes	State Senator	1917	
Ohio 7	Mike DeWine (R)	No	State Senator	1947	
Ohio 9	Marcy Kaptur (D)	Yes	Urban planner	1946	
Ohio 12	John Kasich (R)	Yes	State Senator	1952	
Ohio 19	Ed Feighan (D)	No	County Commissioner	1947	
Oregon 2	Bob Smith (R)	New seat	State House Speaker	1931	
Pennsylvania 3	Robert Borski (D)	Yes	State Representative	1948	
Pennsylvania 4	Joseph P. Kolter (D)	Yes	State Representative	1926	
Pennsylvania 8	Peter H. Kostmayer (D)	Yes	U.S. Representative (Note: Previously elected to the 95th Congress, serving from 1977 to 1981.)	1946	
Pennsylvania 11	Frank Harrison (D)	Yes	Professor	1940	
Pennsylvania 17	George Gekas (R)	Yes	State Senator	1930	
Pennsylvania 21	Tom Ridge (R)	No	District Attorney	1945	
South Carolina 5	John Spratt (D)	No	Attorney	1942	
South Carolina 6	Robin Tallon (D)	Yes	State Representative	1946	
Tennessee 4	Jim Cooper (D)	New seat	Lawyer	1954	
Tennessee 7	Don Sundquist (R)	No	County Party Chair	1936	
Texas 3	Steve Bartlett (R)	No	Party official	1947	
Texas 5	John Bryant (D)	No	State Representative	1947	
Texas 16	Ron Coleman (D)	No	State Representative	1941	
Texas 25	Michael A. Andrews (D)	New seat	Attorney	1944	
Texas 26	Tom Vandergriff (D)	New seat	Mayor of Arlington	1926	
Texas 27	Solomon Ortiz (D)	New seat	County Sheriff	1937	
Utah 3	Howard C. Nielson (R)	New seat	State House Speaker	1924	
Virginia 1	Herbert H. Bateman (R)	No	State Senator	1928	
Virginia 4	Norman Sisisky (D)	Yes	State Delegate	1927	
Virginia 6	Jim Olin (D)	Yes	Vice President of General Electric	1920	
Virginia 9	Rick Boucher (D)	Yes	State Senator	1946	
Washington 8	Rod Chandler (R)	New seat	State Representative	1942	
West Virginia 1	Alan Mollohan (D)	No	U.S. Army Reserve Captain	1943	
West Virginia 2	Harley O. Staggers Jr. (D)	Yes	State Senator	1951	
West Virginia 3	Bob Wise (D)	Yes	State Senator	1948	
Wisconsin 5	Jim Moody (D)	No	State Senator	1935	

=== Took office during the 98th Congress ===
District	Representative	Took office	Switched party	Prior background	Birth year	Ref
Texas 6	Phil Gramm (R)	February 12, 1983	Yes	U.S. Representative (Note: Previously elected to the 96th Congress, serving from 1979 to 1983.)	1942	
New York 7	Gary Ackerman (D)	March 1, 1983	No	State Senator	1942	
Colorado 6	Daniel Schaefer (R)	March 29, 1983	New seat/No (Note: Schaefer succeeded Jack Swigert (R), who died before taking office to represent the newly delegated 6th district.)	State Senator	1936	
California 5	Sala Burton (D)	June 21, 1983	No	Activist	1925	
Illinois 1	Charles Hayes (D)	August 23, 1983	No	Civil rights leader	1918	
Georgia 7	George Darden (D)	November 8, 1983	No	State Representative	1943	
Wisconsin 4	Jerry Kleczka (D)	April 3, 1984	No	State Senator	1943	
Kentucky 7	Chris Perkins (D)	November 6, 1984	No	State Representative	1954	
New Jersey 13	Jim Saxton (R)	November 6, 1984	No	State Senator	1943	

== See also ==
- List of United States representatives in the 98th Congress
- List of United States senators in the 98th Congress

== Notes ==
Preceded by New members of the 97th Congress	New members of the 98th Congress; 1983–1985	Succeeded by New members of the 99th Congress
