= Phillip Hamilton =

American author and professor of history (born 1961)

- Born: February 14, 1961 (age 65); Toronto, Ontario, Canada
- Occupations: Author and university professor

Phillip Hamilton (born February 14, 1961) is an American author and professor of history. He is the author of two books, The Making and Unmaking of a Revolutionary Family: The Tuckers of Virginia, 1752–1830 and Serving the Old Dominion, a history of Christopher Newport University, a state university in Virginia.

== Biography ==
Hamilton graduated from Gettysburg College, then attended graduate school in history at Washington University in St. Louis, where he earned a Ph.D. degree. He and his wife, Christina, then moved to St. Peters, Missouri, where he got a job at Lindenwood University They had two children, Thomas, born in 1993 and Jacob, born in 1997. They then moved to Newport News, Virginia, where Hamilton was hired as an associate professor of history at Christopher Newport University.

After seven years of writing, editing, and submitting, his first book, The Making and Unmaking of a Revolutionary Family: The Tuckers of Virginia, 1752–1830 was published by University of Virginia Press in 2008. Afterwards, university president Paul S. Trible Jr. asked Hamilton to begin writing Serving the Old Dominion: A History of Christopher Newport University, 1958–2011, which was published in 2011.

== Bibliography ==
- "Gentry Women and the Transformation of Daily Life in Jeffersonian and Antebellum Virginia," in Women Shaping the South: Creating and Confronting Change, edited by Angela Boswell and Judith N. McArthur (Columbia, Missouri: University of Missouri Press, 2006).
- "The Articles of Confederation," in History in Dispute: The American Revolution, edited by Keith Krawczynski (Detroit: St. James Press, 2003).
- "Revolutionary Principles and Family Loyalties: Slavery's Transformation in the St. George Tucker Household of Early National Virginia," William and Mary Quarterly, 3rd series, 55 (October 1998), 531556
- "Education in the St. George Tucker Household: Change and Continuity in Jeffersonian Virginia," Virginia Magazine of History and Biography 102 (April 1994), 167192
