= 1981 Virginia lieutenant gubernatorial election =

- November 3, 1981
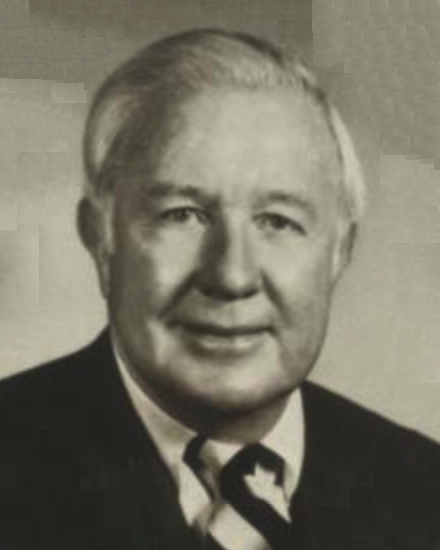

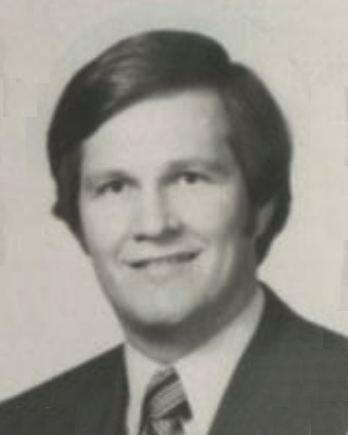
Nominee	Dick Davis	Nathan H. Miller
Party	Democratic	Republican
Popular vote	750,743	602,714
Percentage	55.44%	44.51%
- County and independent city results Davis: 50–60% 60–70% 70–80% 80–90% Miller: 50–60% 60–70%
Lieutenant Governor before election
Chuck Robb
Democratic
Elected Lieutenant Governor
Dick Davis
Democratic

The 1981 Virginia lieutenant gubernatorial election was held on November 3, 1981. Democratic nominee Dick Davis defeated Republican nominee Nathan H. Miller with 55.44% of the vote.

== General election ==
=== Candidates ===
- Dick Davis, Democratic, Former Party Chair
- Nathan H. Miller, Republican, State Senator

=== Results ===
1981 Virginia lieutenant gubernatorial election
Party	Candidate	Votes	%	±%
Democratic	Dick Davis	750,743	55.44%	
Republican	Nathan H. Miller	602,714	44.51%	
Majority		148,029		
Turnout				
Democratic hold		Swing		
