= Claude A. Swanson =

American lawyer and politician (1862–1939)

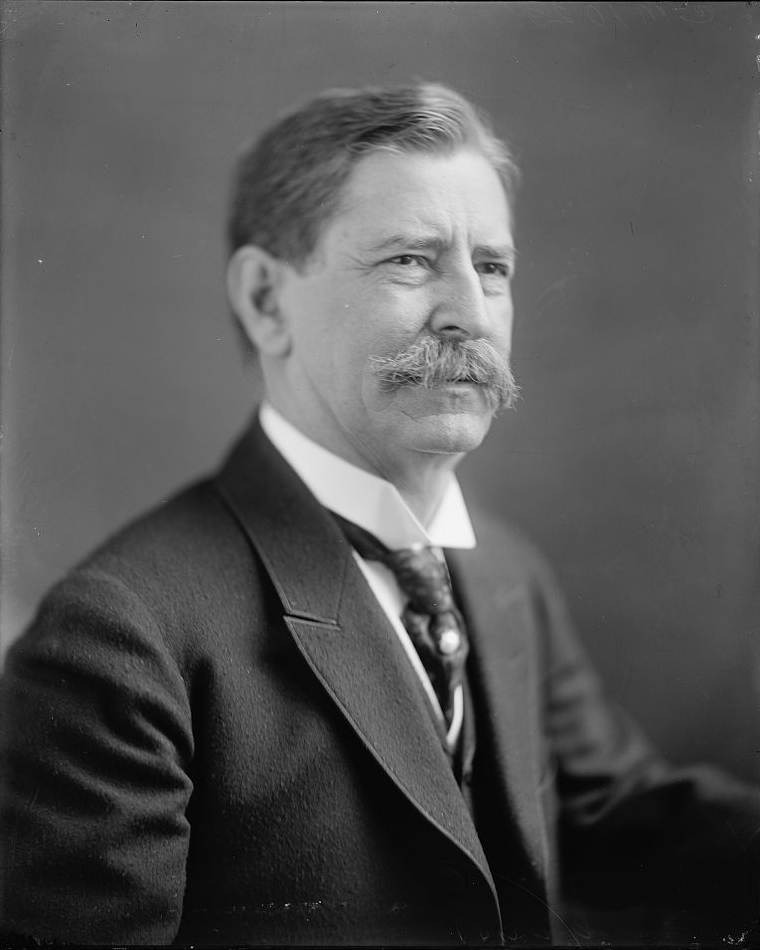
- Portrait c. 1933–39

45th United States Secretary of the Navy
- In office March 5, 1933 – July 7, 1939
- President: Franklin D. Roosevelt
- Preceded by: Charles Francis Adams III
- Succeeded by: Charles Edison

United States Senator from Virginia
- In office August 1, 1910 – March 3, 1933
- Preceded by: John W. Daniel
- Succeeded by: Harry F. Byrd

45th Governor of Virginia
- In office February 1, 1906 – February 10, 1910
- Lieutenant: James Taylor Ellyson
- Preceded by: Andrew Montague
- Succeeded by: William Hodges Mann

Member of the U.S. House of Representatives from Virginia's 5th district
- In office March 4, 1893 – January 30, 1906
- Preceded by: Posey G. Lester
- Succeeded by: Edward W. Saunders

Personal details
- Born: Claude Augustus Swanson; March 31, 1862 Swansonville, Virginia, C.S.
- Died: July 7, 1939 (aged 77) Rapidan Camp, Virginia, U.S.
- Party: Democratic
- Spouse(s): Elizabeth Deane Lyons (m. 1894; died 1920). Lulie Lyons Hall (m. 1923)
- Education: Virginia Agricultural and Mechanical College; Randolph-Macon College (BA); University of Virginia (LLB)

Claude Augustus Swanson (March 31, 1862 – July 7, 1939) was an American lawyer and Democratic politician from Virginia. He served as U.S. Representative (1893–1906), Governor of Virginia (1906–1910), and U.S. Senator from Virginia (1910–1933), before becoming U.S. Secretary of the Navy under President Franklin D. Roosevelt from 1933 until his death. Swanson and fellow U.S. Senator Thomas Staples Martin led a Democratic political machine in Virginia for decades in the late 19th and early 20th century, which later became known as the Byrd Organization for Swanson's successor as U.S. Senator, Harry Flood Byrd.

== Early and family life ==
Swanson was born to Catherine Rebecca Pritchett (1834–1873) and her husband John Muse Swanson (1829–1914) in Swansonville, Virginia, on March 31, 1862. His great-grandfather William Swanson moved to Pittsylvania from Albemarle County, Virginia, had farmed a plantation using slave labor, represented Pittsylvania County in the Virginia General Assembly, and advocating for building a railroad between Richmond and Danville. John M. Swanson, who owned slaves in 1850 and 1860, served in the 5th Virginia Cavalry Regiment and 21st Virginia Infantry during the American Civil War.

After the Civil War, he worked with his brother as merchants and tobacco manufacturers, J.M. Swanson & Bro. in Swansonville. John and Catherine Swanson had three other sons who survived to adulthood, as well as three daughters: William Graves Swanson (1860–1934), John Pritchett Swanson and Henry Clay Swanson (1870–1952) and sisters Annie Blanche Swanson (1864–1948), Sallie Hill Swanson (1869–1950) and Julia Benson Swanson (1869–1933). Two siblings did not survive to adulthood.

Swanson married Elizabeth Deane Lyons on December 11, 1894, in the District of Columbia. She died on July 13, 1920. He married her widowed sister Lulie Lyons Hall (1867–1953) three years later, and she survived him. Swanson had met them both while studying at Randolph Macon Academy, for their mother ran a boardinghouse to support her family.

== Career ==
Most Swanson men were Democrats and merchants in southwestern Virginia after the American Civil War. Commerce was the family business. A Swedish ancestor had moved from Philadelphia to southwestern Virginia in the 17th century to farm, as well as trade tobacco (and supply farmers with goods they needed). His grandfather had appeared as a "Tobacconist" in the 1850 U.S.Census, and the same label was used for his father in the 1860 census. (Note: U.S. Federal census for Pittsylvania County North district lists John Muse Swanson as owning real estate worth $4300 and personal property (including slaves) worth$10,000. His father, 58 year old John Swanson is listed as a factory hand with $3500 in real estate and 160 in personal property in Pittsylvania County's Southern district. John Swanson's wife Julia (also 58) worked as a teacher and their sons Samuel (aged 22) and James M. (aged 20 and a factory hand) also lived in that home.) His brother William G. Swanson later ran the wholesale Swanson Brothers Company, and served as chief clerk at the White Rock Indian Reservation in Utah during the administration of Democratic President Grover Cleveland. John Pritchett Swanson operated the Swanson Supply Company, a wholesale grocery and farmers supply business, and the family also had interests in the South Atlantic Lumber Company and Clement Lumber Company in Greensboro, North Carolina.

=== Merchant to teacher to lawyer ===
Swanson studied under Celestia Parrish then worked for his father in the family business, and taught as a schoolteacher himself for two years (for $30/month when he was 15 and 16 years old) when the bright tobacco market collapsed in 1876.

When Virginia's fiscal crisis meant teachers were not paid, and having earned enough to fund his further studies, Swanson entered the new state agricultural college in Blacksburg, Virginia Polytechnic Institute and State University (or Virginia Tech). Another family financial crisis led him and his brother to work in Danville as clerks in John Carter's grocery.

Four Danville Methodists lent Swanson funds to attend Randolph Macon College in Ashland. He graduated in 1885 after winning oratorical prizes and editing the college newspaper as well as the Hanover and Caroline News. He then went to Charlottesville and received a degree from the University of Virginia School of Law, graduating in 1886.

After admission to the Virginia Bar, Swanson set up a legal practice in Chatham, the Pittsylvania county seat.

=== Congressman and Virginia politician ===
The young orator Swanson had drawn the attention of Democratic Party politicians in Richmond when he was studying in Ashland just up the railroad line. He won his first public office in 1892, a seat in the U.S. Congress representing Virginia's 5th congressional district. Swanson would serve seven terms in the U.S. House of Representatives, from 1893 until 1906. The district extended from Pittsylvania and Franklin counties into the Republican-leaning mountain counties of Floyd, Carroll and Grayson. Swanson survived two close election contests.

During the 1893 depression, Swanson became Virginia's most outspoken congressman endorsing William Jennings Bryan's inflationary fiscal reforms, i.e. allowing both silver and gold as legal tender. By 1896, Swanson had allied himself with Henry D. Flood, James Hay, Francis Lassiter and Thomas Staples Martin (whom he helped elect to the Senate in 1893).

Although his family's mercantile background had shown Swanson the importance of credit, his views (and those of his allies) outraged the conservative creditor class. Railroad developer Joseph F. Bryan, who owned the Richmond Times analogized Swanson to communists, anarchists and repudiators of debt." Congressman Swanson also endorsed free rural mail delivery, aid to rural banks, graduated federal income taxes (that became the 16th Amendment), reduced federal excise taxes and direct election of U.S. Senators (that became the 17th Amendment). He rose to influence on the House Ways and Means Committee and as proto-party whip. When the Spanish–American War in 1898 stimulated demand for farm products, the family farms again prospered and his brothers opened a wholesale grocery in Danville.

In 1903 Swanson bought Eldon, a plantation in Pittsylvania County, Virginia, built by the Whittle family for whom Chatham's Whittle Street is named. He lived there (when not in Washington, D.C.) most of the rest of his life. Swanson also entered into various real estate consortiums with Flood and his nephew, Harry F. Byrd.

=== Governor ===
Swanson's attempt to become Governor of Virginia in 1901 failed. However, after the Virginia Constitution of 1902 disenfranchised many African American and poor white voters, he won the Democratic primary in 1905. In the general election he defeated Republican Lunsford L. Lewis of Rockingham County by a nearly 2 to 1 margin.

Swanson became the 45th governor of Virginia, serving from 1906 until 1910. He was known as a progressive: A Board of Charities and Corrections and new board of heath were set up, while hospitals and sanitariums were built for mute, deaf and blind Virginians, along with epileptics and tuberculosis victims. Also, as noted by one study, “Requiring that federal sanitary standards be followed, Swanson ordered Saunders to indict reluctant bakery owners who failed to meet them.” In addition, a number of labor laws were introduced. However, this was also an era of increased racial polarization in Virginia, and under Swanson and his lieutenant governor James Taylor Ellyson, African American schools received far fewer funds, and the state's eugenics program would flower in the 1920s.

=== U.S. Senator ===
Senator John W. Daniel died in office in June 1910. In August 1910, his successor as governor William Hodges Mann appointed Swanson to fill the vacancy until the end of Daniel's term on March 3, 1911. In February 1911, Governor Mann appointed Swanson to the term Daniel for which Daniel had been reelected before his death, which began on March 4, 1911. Swanson won a non-binding primary for the seat in September 1911, and in January 1912, the Virginia General Assembly ratified the primary results by electing Swanson to the remainder of the term, which ended on March 3, 1917.

Swanson continued to win reelection, and represented Virginia in the U.S. Senate from 1910 until 1933. Fellow Progressive Virginian Woodrow Wilson won the 1912 Presidential election, so Swanson supported successful reforms in child labor and banking laws, reduced tariffs and federal funding of highway construction. He and Virginia's other Senator Thomas Staples Martin also supported expansion of the Norfolk Naval Base and the League of Nations. Swanson publicly opposed women's suffrage and what became the 19th Amendment, although he advised President Wilson privately concerning its passage.

During the Republican administrations of the 1920s, Swanson's gained seniority in the Senate, and served on the Senate Foreign Relations Committee. Swanson continued to advocate for the U.S. Navy, particularly as Japanese aggression in the Pacific threatened American commercial interests. He argued for a "treaty navy". His familiarity with the 1922 Washington agreements and those of the London Treaty (1930) led President Herbert Hoover (though of the opposing political party) to appoint Swanson as an American delegate to the unsuccessful Geneva Disarmament Conference of 1932. Swanson had been the first prominent Virginia politician to oppose anti-Prohibition Roman Catholic 1928 Democratic nominee Al Smith, and Hoover would become the first Republican presidential candidate to carry Virginia since Reconstruction.

When the Great Depression hit and voters elected Democrat Franklin D. Roosevelt President, Swanson became Secretary of the Navy, serving from 1933 until his death in 1939. Harry F. Byrd, who had succeeded to leadership of Martin's political organization after Martin's death, succeeded Swanson in the Senate, but became a leading critic of the New Deal. As Naval Secretary, Swanson oversaw passage and implementation of the largest U.S. peacetime naval appropriations up to that time.

== Death and legacy ==
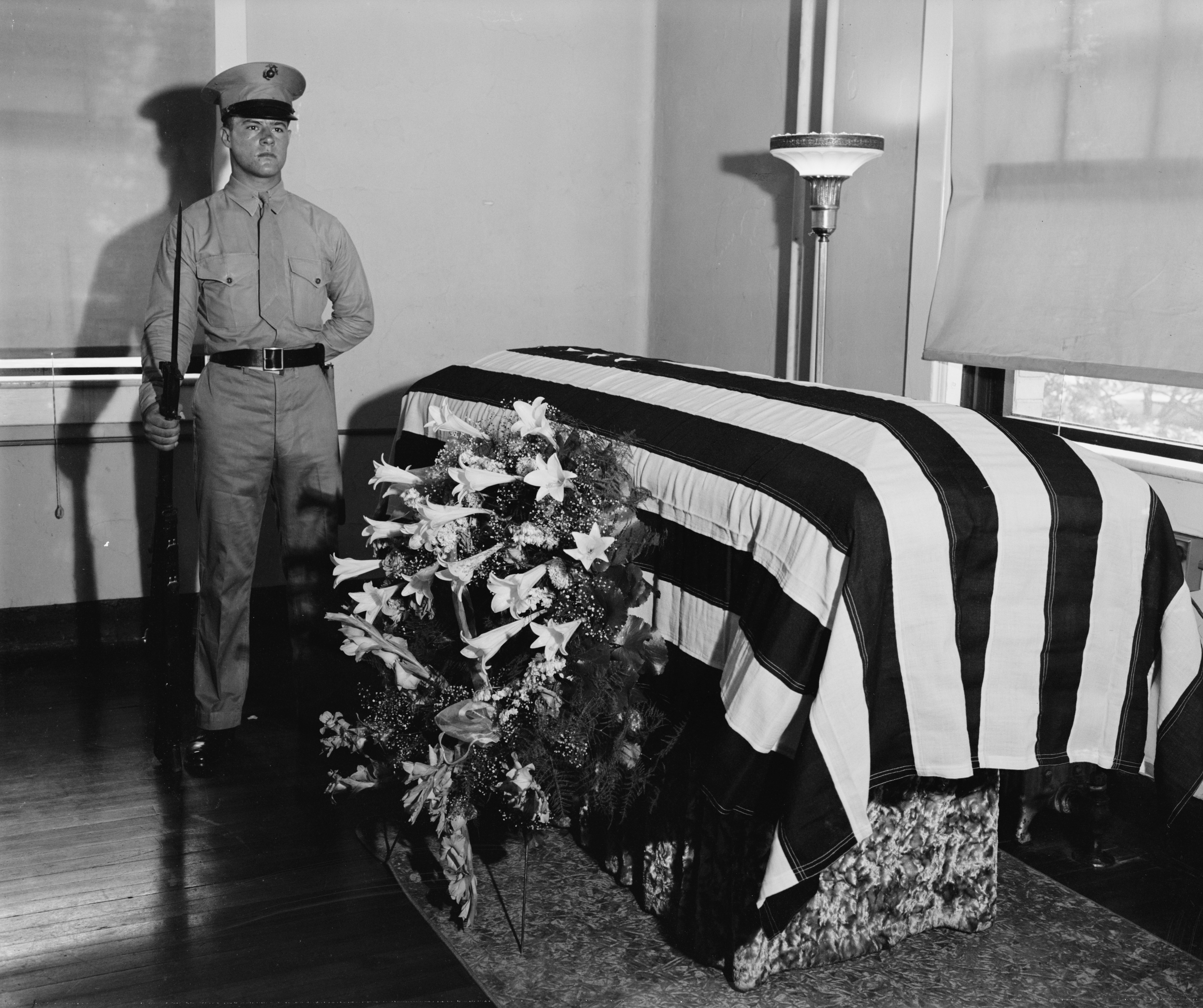
A Marine guards Swanson's body as it lies in state in Washington D.C.

Ill for several months, Swanson died at Herbert Hoover's Rapidan Camp (which was then available for use by the Roosevelt Administration) in Criglersville, Madison County, Virginia, on July 7, 1939. The 77 year old had also visited Shenandoah National Park and reviewed work performed by the Civilian Conservation Corps. His funeral was held in the chamber of the U.S. Senate. Then his body was taken to Richmond and buried in Hollywood Cemetery.

The Library of Virginia holds his executive papers. In 1992, Virginia erected a highway marker near Eldon to commemorate his service.

Arlington, Virginia, named Swanson Middle School in his honor. The U.S. Navy also named a destroyer USS Swanson (DD-443) for him.

Short-lived Swanson County, Oklahoma, was also named for him, while he was still alive.

== Electoral history ==
- 1892; Swanson was elected to the U.S. House of Representatives with 53.91% of the vote, defeating Populist Benjamin T. Jones.
- 1894; Swanson was re-elected with 52.34% of the vote, defeating Republican G.W.Cornett, Independent G.W. Hale, and Populist W.T. Shelton.
- 1896; Swanson was re-elected with 50.98% of the vote, defeating Republican John Robert Brown.
- 1898; Swanson was re-elected with 57.02% of the vote, defeating Republican Edmund Parr, Populist R.A. Bennett, Independent Republican R.O. Martin, and Independent C.T. Seay
- 1900; Swanson was re-elected with 58.14% of the vote, defeating Republican John R. Whitehead.
- 1902; Swanson was re-elected with 60.8% of the vote, defeating Republican Beverly A. Davis and Populist Dan Dickerson.
- 1904; Swanson was re-elected with 64.98% of the vote, defeating Republican J.B. Stovall.
- 1905; Swanson was elected Governor of Virginia with 64.51% of the vote, defeating Republican Lunsford L. Lewis and Socialist Labor B.D. Downey.

== Notes ==
U.S. House of Representatives
| Preceded by Posey G. Lester | Member of the U.S. House of Representatives from Virginia's 5th congressional district 1893–1906 | Succeeded by Edward W. Saunders |
Party political offices
| Preceded by Andrew Montague | Democratic nominee for Governor of Virginia; 1905 | Succeeded by William Hodges Mann |
| First | Democratic nominee for U.S. Senator from Virginia (Class 1); 1916, 1922, 1928 | Succeeded by Harry F. Byrd |
Political offices
| Preceded by Andrew Montague | Governor of Virginia; 1906–1910 | Succeeded by William Hodges Mann |
| Preceded by Charles Francis Adams III | United States Secretary of the Navy; 1933–1939 | Succeeded by Charles Edison |
U.S. Senate
| Preceded by John W. Daniel | U.S. Senator (Class 1) from Virginia; 1910–1933; Served alongside: Thomas S. Martin, Carter Glass | Succeeded by Harry F. Byrd |
| Preceded by George Sutherland | Chair of the Senate Public Buildings Committee; 1913–1918 | Succeeded by James A. Reed |
| Preceded by Benjamin Tillman | Chair of the Senate Naval Affairs Committee; 1918–1919 | Succeeded by Carroll S. Page |
