= Ferguson, North Carolina =

- Unincorporated community
- Location within North Carolina Location within the United States
- Coordinates: 36°05′08″N 81°22′06″W
- Country: United States
- State: North Carolina
- County: Wilkes
- Elevation: 1,086 ft (331 m)
- Time zone: UTC-5 (Eastern (EST))
  - Summer (DST): UTC-4 (EDT)
- ZIP code: 28624
- Area code: 336
- GNIS feature ID: 1020232

Ferguson is an unincorporated community in Wilkes County, North Carolina, United States. Ferguson is located on North Carolina Highway 268, 12.3 miles (19.8 km) west-southwest of Wilkesboro. Ferguson has a post office with ZIP code 28624.

== Attractions ==
- Whippoorwill Academy and Village, which features a museum relating to Tom Dula and hosts Tom Dooley and Southern/Appalachian Culture Day, Daniel Boone Day, Veterans' Day, and Edith's Barn Music Festival.
- Graves for Tom Dula, Laura Foster, and Anne Melton—three persons involved in a famous murder incident and immortalized in song.
- Leatherwood in Ferguson, where you can ride horses or rent a cabin and stay for a while

== Notable people ==
- Thomas C. Dula, alleged killer who inspired the "Tom Dooley" folk song.
- Roger Hamby, NASCAR driver
- Clinton Miller. Politician and Singer
- Shirley B. Randleman, Politician born in North Wilkesboro but raised in Ferguson
- Morgan Shepherd, NASCAR driver
- Irene Triplett, was the last recipient of an American Civil War pension
