= Bonnie Lineweaver Paul =

American politician (1940–2020)

Bonnie L. Paul

Member of the Virginia House of Delegates from the 16th district
- In office January 14, 1976 – January 9, 1980 Serving with Clinton Miller
- Preceded by: Nathan H. Miller
- Succeeded by: Kevin G. Miller

Personal details
- Born: Bonnie Lineweaver; June 6, 1940 Harrisonburg, Virginia, U.S.
- Died: May 24, 2020 (aged 79) Clover Hill, Virginia, U.S.
- Party: Republican
- Spouse: John Abbott Paul (m. 1963)
- Education: Wilson College (BA); Washington and Lee University (JD)
- Occupation: Lawyer; politician

Bonnie Lineweaver Paul (June 6, 1940 – May 24, 2020) is a Virginia lawyer and Republican politician, who represented a district in the Blue Ridge Mountains in the Virginia House of Delegates for two terms.

== Early and family life ==
Bonnie Lineweaver was born in Harrisonburg, Virginia on June 6, 1940. She attended the local public schools, graduated from Harrisonburg High School, then attended Wilson College in Chambersburg, Pennsylvania, receiving her degree in 1962. She then returned to her hometown and attended undergraduate and graduate level courses at James Madison University, from which she received a J.D. degree both in 1983.

She married John Abbott Paul, nephew of senior U.S. District Judge John Paul Jr. in June 1963. They have two sons and a daughter.

== Career ==
In 1975, voters from Rockingham, Page, and Shenandoah Counties elected incumbent Republican I. Clinton Miller and Mrs. Paul to represent them in the Virginia House of Delegates (a part-time position). Both out-polled Democrat William B. Allen III and Nancy B. Jones for the two-seat district. Two years later, both out-polled Democrat Rita Lancaster.

Mrs. Paul, who ran as a housewife, had been active in the local League of Women Voters and from 1974-1975 had served as a director of the Shenandoah Valley Soil and Water Conservation District, as well as on the Virginia Public Telecommunications Council (1973–75) and the Overall Advisory Council on Needs of Handicapped Children and Adults.

While in the House of Delegates, Mrs. Paul became known for her opposition to the Equal Rights Amendment. She and Independent Eva Mae Fleming Scott succeeded in blocking its passage in Virginia, despite the work of Democratic delegates Dorothy Shoemaker McDiarmid and Mary A. R. Marshall. However, all four women worked together on other issues, especially strengthening the legal and economic position of Virginia women.

In 1979, voters elected Clinton Miller and fellow Republican Kevin G. Miller (a retired accounting professor) over Democrat Roger A. Ritchie.

Admitted to the Virginia bar in 1983, Bonnie Lineweaver Paul currently has a private general legal practice, conducting a significant amount of civil rights defense as well as trusts and estates work. She also helped develop an exhibit of Shenandoah Valley Folk Art for the Harrisonburg-Rockingham Historical Society.
