= 1982 United States Senate election in Virginia =

- November 2, 1982
- Turnout: 35.7% (voting eligible)
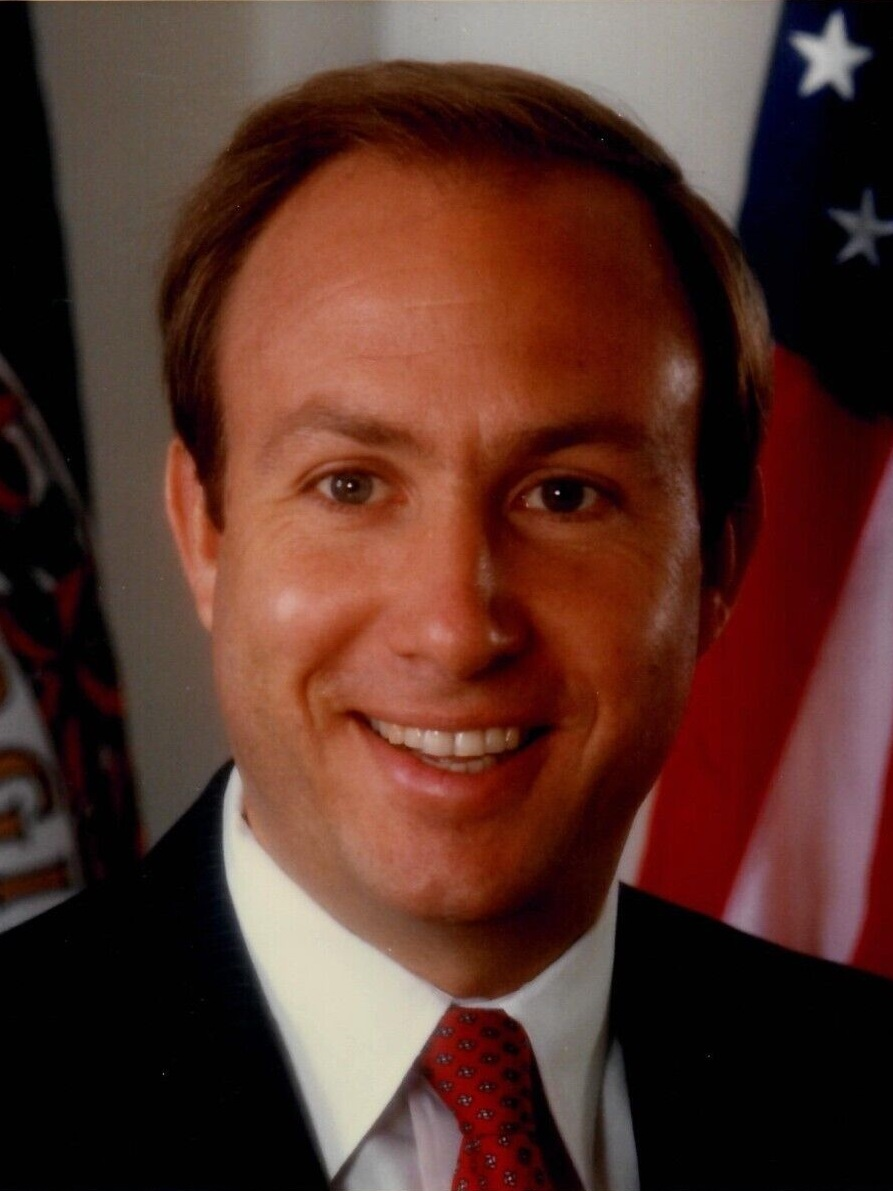

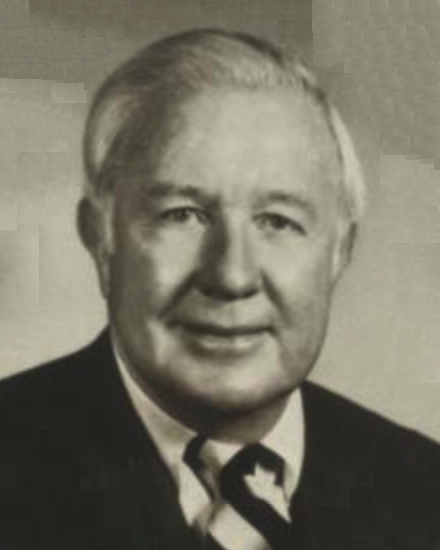
Nominee	Paul Trible	Dick Davis
Party	Republican	Democratic
Popular vote	724,571	690,839
Percentage	51.18%	48.80%
- Trible: 50–60% 60–70% 80–90% Davis: 50–60% 60–70% 70–80%
U.S. senator before election
Harry F. Byrd Jr.
Independent
Elected U.S. Senator
Paul Trible
Republican

The 1982 United States Senate election in Virginia was held on November 2, 1982. U.S. Representative from Virginia's 1st district, Paul Trible replaced Independent Senator Harry F. Byrd Jr., who was stepping down after three terms.

Republicans won this seat for the first time since Reconstruction, and this was the first occasion where Republicans simultaneously held both of the state's Senate seats. This election was the first time ever that a Republican won a full term to this Senate seat in Virginia. This election was the first time since 1928 that the winner of Virginia's Class 1 Senate seat was not a member of the Byrd family.

== General election ==
=== Candidates ===
- Dick Davis, lieutenant governor of Virginia (Democratic)
- Paul Trible, U.S. representative from Tappahannock (Republican)

=== Results ===
United States Senate election in Virginia, 1982
Party	Candidate	Votes	%	±%
Republican	Paul Trible	724,571	51.18%	+51.18%
Democratic	Dick Davis	690,839	48.80%	+10.53%
Write-ins		212	0.01%	
Majority		33,732	2.38%	−16.55%
Turnout		1,415,622		
Republican gain from Independent		Swing		

==== By county and independent city ====
1982 Virginia United States Senate election by county or independent city
	Paul Trible Republican		Dick Davis Democratic		Various candidates Write-ins		Margin		Total votes cast
	#	%	#	%	#	%	#	%	Total votes cast
Chesterfield County	27,136	0.00%	11,865	0.00%	4	0.00%	15,271	0.00%	39,074
Henrico County	38,428	0.00%	20,501	0.00%	5	0.00%	17,927	0.00%	58,934
Martinsville City	2,424	0.00%	2,640	0.00%	0	0.00%	216	0.00%	5,064
Richmond City	25,287	0.00%	39,669	0.00%	21	0.00%	14,382	0.00%	64,977
Totals	724,571	51.18%	690,839	48.80%	212	0.01%	33,732	2.38%	1,415,622

== See also ==
- 1982 United States Senate elections
