= Clinton Miller =

American singer, attorney, and politician (born 1939)

Member of the Virginia State Corporation Commission
- In office February 15, 1996 – February 1, 2006
- Preceded by: Preston C. Shannon
- Succeeded by: Judith Jagdmann

Member of the Virginia House of Delegates
- In office January 12, 1972 – January 10, 1996 Serving with Nathan H. Miller (1972‍–‍1976); Bonnie L. Paul (1976‍–‍1980); Kevin G. Miller (1980‍–‍1982)
- Preceded by: Donald K. Funkhouser
- Succeeded by: Glenn Weatherholtz
- Constituency: 16th district (1972‍–‍1982); 15th district (1982‍–‍1983); 28th district (1983‍–‍1992); 26th district (1992‍–‍1996)

Commonwealth's Attorney for Shenandoah County
- In office January 1, 1968 – December 31, 1971
- Preceded by: Kermit L. Racey
- Succeeded by: Albert T. Mitchell

Personal details
- Born: Isaac Clinton Miller; May 24, 1939 (age 87) Ferguson, North Carolina, United States
- Party: Republican
- Spouse: Linda Ann Emswiler
- Education: American University (BA); Washington and Lee University (LLB)
- Occupation: Lawyer; singer; politician

Isaac Clinton "Clint" Miller (born May 24, 1939) is an American former rockabilly singer, attorney, and politician. He served twenty-four years as a member of the Virginia House of Delegates and ten years as a judge on the Virginia State Corporation Commission.

== Biography ==
Miller was born on May 24, 1939 in Ferguson, North Carolina. He was raised in Woodstock, Virginia and began playing country music professionally as a teenager in the 1950s for Washington, DC-area stations such as WTOP and WMAL. He signed with ABC-Paramount Records in 1957, and the label gave him the tune "Bertha Lou", a recording of which the label had unsuccessfully attempted to license from Johnny Faire. Miller's version of the tune proved more successful on the charts, peaking at #79 on the Billboard Hot 100 in early 1958. He released a second single on ABC later that year and continued releasing singles into the early 1960s, though none of these charted. He would later record again in 1976 (a single) and 1993 (a three-track EP).

Miller was still in high school at the time of his chart success, and he graduated from the Stella Adler Theatre School in New York in 1961. He attended American University and then took a law degree at Washington & Lee University.

He served from 1967 to 1971 as commonwealth's attorney for Shenandoah County and was elected to the Virginia House of Delegates in 1972 as a Republican. He severed in the House through 1996. In 1993, he ran for Governor of Virginia, but he lost the Republican nomination to former U.S. Representative George Allen. Following this, he worked in law until retiring in 2006.
