= Lunsford L. Lewis =

American judge

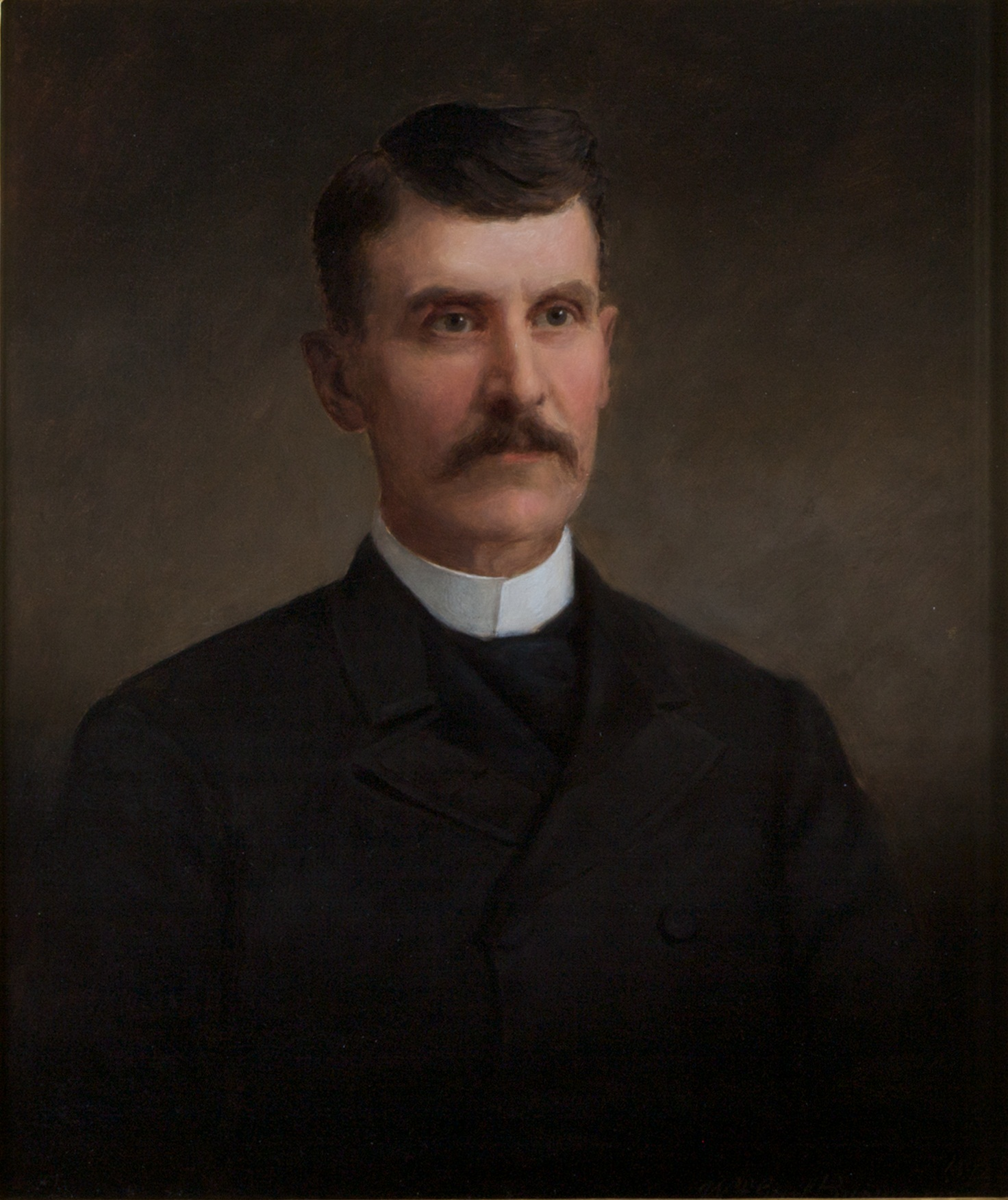
- Oil on canvas portrait of Lunsford Lewis, by William G. Browne Jr.

United States Attorney for the Eastern District of Virginia
- In office 1905–1912
- President: Theodore Roosevelt; William Howard Taft
- Preceded by: Robert H. Talley
- Succeeded by: D. Lawrence Groner
- In office 1902–1905
- President: Theodore Roosevelt
- Preceded by: Edgar Allan
- Succeeded by: Robert H. Talley
- In office 1874–1882
- President: Ulysses S. Grant; Rutherford B. Hayes; James A. Garfield; Chester A. Arthur
- Preceded by: Henry H. Wells
- Succeeded by: John Sergeant Wise

Justice of the Supreme Court of Virginia
- In office November 10, 1882 – December 31, 1894
- Appointed by: William E. Cameron
- Preceded by: Richard C. L. Moncure
- Succeeded by: James Keith

Personal details
- Born: Lunsford Lomax Lewis; March 17, 1846 Rockingham, Virginia, U.S.
- Died: March 13, 1920 (aged 73) Richmond, Virginia, U.S.
- Party: Republican
- Education: University of Virginia (LLB)

Lunsford Lomax Lewis (March 17, 1846 – March 13, 1920) was a Virginia attorney, judge and political figure.

== Early life and education ==
Lewis was born in Rockingham County, Virginia. His boyhood was spent in the valley of Virginia and he was educated at Centre College in Kentucky and the University of Virginia. He graduated in 1867 with a Bachelor of Laws degree and was admitted to the bar.

== Career ==
=== Early legal practice and first appointment as United States Attorney ===
He began practice in Culpeper, Virginia, and was soon designated by the United States Government as Commonwealth's Attorney for several counties in the northern part of the state. When he was only twenty-seven, Lewis was appointed by President Ulysses S. Grant United States Attorney for the Eastern District of Virginia.

=== State supreme court ===
He was elected to the Supreme Court of Appeals in 1882 and served on the court through 1894, becoming its president when the court convened in January 1883. His term expired on January 1, 1895, and Judge Lewis resumed the practice of law in Richmond.

=== Return to federal service and 1905 gubernatorial campaign ===
Lewis was president of the Virginia Bar Association during 1900–1901.

In December 1902, he was again appointed United States Attorney for the Eastern District of Virginia, this time being appointed by President Theodore Roosevelt.

In 1905, he ran for Governor of Virginia, but was defeated, losing to Democrat Claude A. Swanson, and receiving 35.09% of the vote.

=== Later career and death ===
From 1910 to 1912, he was U.S. Attorney for the Eastern District once again, but resigned and practiced law until a few months before his death.

Lewis was active in hereditary and patriotic societies. He served as President of the Virginia Society of the Sons of the American Revolution from 1902 to 1912. When Congress granted a federal charter to the National Society of the Sons of the American Revolution in June 1906, Lewis was named as the sole representative from Virginia in the list of incorporators.

Party political offices
Preceded by John Hampton Hoge	Republican nominee for Governor of Virginia; 1905	Succeeded by William P. Kent
