= Elizabeth Lyons Swanson =

First Lady of Virginia

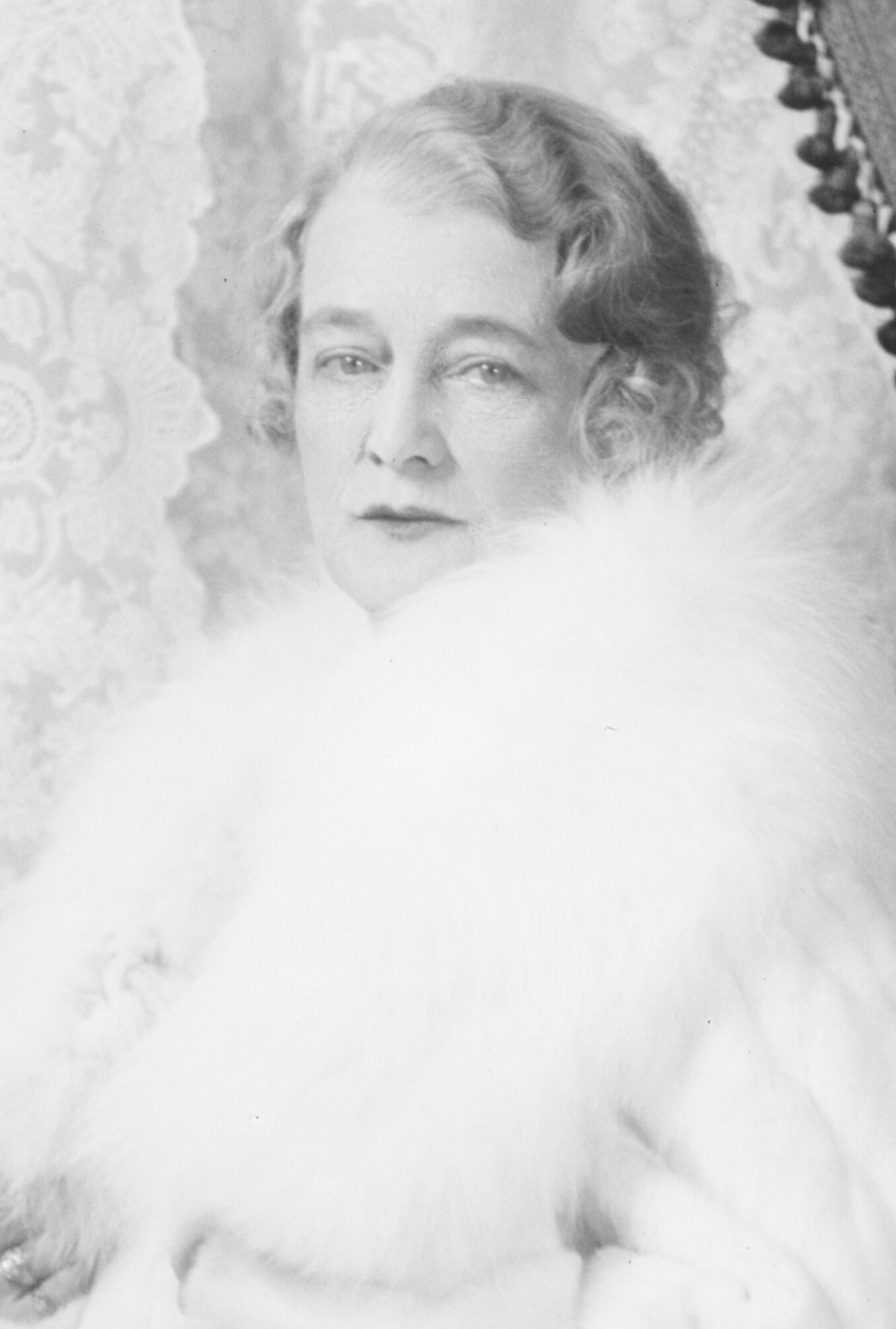
- Photograph of Swanson circa 1905

First Lady of Virginia
- In role February 1, 1906 – February 10, 1910
- Governor: Claude A. Swanson
- Preceded by: Elizabeth Montague
- Succeeded by: Etta Mann

Personal details
- Born: Elizabeth Deane Lyons; 1863 Virginia, U.S.
- Died: July 13, 1920 (aged 56–57) Washington, D.C., U.S.
- Resting place: Hollywood Cemetery; Richmond, Virginia
- Party: Democratic
- Spouse: Claude A. Swanson
- Relations: James Lyons (grandfather) Peter Lyons (great-grandfather)

Elizabeth "Lizzie" Swanson (née Lyons; 1863 – July 13, 1920) was a socialite, painter, and farmer who served as the First Lady of Virginia from 1906 to 1910 as the first wife of Claude A. Swanson.

== Early life and family ==
Elizabeth Deane Lyons was born in 1863 in Richmond, Virginia to a prominent family, the daughter of Dr. Peter Lyons and Adeline Deane. Her father served as Surgeon of the Confederate States Medical Department and her paternal grandfather, James Lyons, was a prominent Virginia politician and member of the Confederate States Congress. Her paternal great-grandfather was Peter Lyons, the second Chief Justice of Virginia, and her 2x maternal great grandfather was Captain Thomas H. Drew, who had served in the Life Guard of George Washington.

During her young adulthood, she spent much of her time in the D.C. home of her uncle, Justice L.Q.C. Lamar of the United States Supreme Court.

=== Marriage ===
In December 1894, she married Claude A. Swanson in Washington, D.C. Their wedding was widely covered in society papers and described as "uniting two prominent families of the Old Dominion." They did not have any children.

== Public life ==
Swanson has been described as being heavily influential in her husband's political career, having campaigned heavily for his re-election campaigns to Congress, his election to the Governorship, and his run for the United States Senate.

=== First lady ===
As first lady, Swanson became widely known for hosting lavish social functions at the Executive Mansion. Outside of Virginia, she also served as hostess at many Washington, D.C. social functions. During her time as first lady, she served as hostess for a royal visit by Prince Wilhelm, Duke of Södermanland (representative of Oscar II) in 1907. He remarked, "never have I seen such beauty, such grace."

She was described as a person of "unusual social prestige" who was also a talented farmer, raising tobacco on her family's 650-acre plantation in Spotsylvania County. She also raised Virginia ham and chickens on the plantation and was an accomplished painter of porcelain.

Swanson frequently hosted public receptions at the Executive Mansion for members of the general public and military veterans, particularly former Confederate soldiers. In 1903, she and her husband took a six-week European trip with Thomas Martin and his wife. In 1907, she was the official hostess of the Jamestown Exposition which received national news coverage.

Swanson was a lifelong sympathizer to the cause of the Confederacy in the United States, and was a long-time member of the United Daughters of the Confederacy, attending many of their conventions and events.

=== Senator's wife ===
She was featured on the cover of the Atlanta Georgian and News Society magazine in 1911, where she was described as a "popular" and "prominent figure" in Washington, D.C. political and social circles. Her social activities were widely covered in regional and national newspapers. She was an attendee of the 1912 Democratic National Convention, of which her husband was chairman of the Virginia delegation. In 1914, she was the patron of a benefit for the industrial educational fund for the Virginia mountaineers. The Evening Argus described her as "a leading figure in the social life of Washington."

Swanson was a close acquaintance and friend of Mary Custis Lee and Helen Taft Manning. While she was herself influential in political circles, Swanson opposed women's suffrage and shared with a newspaper her belief that "home is the place for woman and that her power is centered there and not in a public career. We reign in our homes and we influence our husbands, and this is mission enough for the most ambitious. Every woman has a vote if she does her duty."

She served as regent of the Dorothea Henry Chapter of the Daughters of the American Revolution, and was delegate to its continental congresses. She was also a member of the Colonial Dames of America and the Society of the Descendants of Colonial Governors. In 1913, she was a breakfast guest alongside First Lady Ellen Axson Wilson. In the same year, Swanson ran for president of the Congressional Club, a membership organization of the spouses of members of Congress. She also contributed recipes to the Economy Administration Cookbook.

Swanson was active in the Second inauguration of Woodrow Wilson, and was member of a committee to represent Virginia in the inaugural parade. During World War I, Swanson was involved in various activities to aid in the war effort. She did volunteer sewing for the American Red Cross and made surgical dressings. Swanson was also a trustee and board member of the Southern Relief Society, including serving for a time as the organization's vice president.

=== Assassination attempt ===
In July 1907, Swanson narrowly survived an apparent assassination attempt of either herself or Judge Alton B. Parker, with whom she was sitting on a train ride to Richmond.

== Death ==
Swanson spent the last several years of her life suffering from appendicitis and other complications. She died on July 13, 1920 in Washington, D.C., aged 56 or 57. She is interred in her family crypt at Hollywood Cemetery in Richmond.
