= 1905 Virginia gubernatorial election =

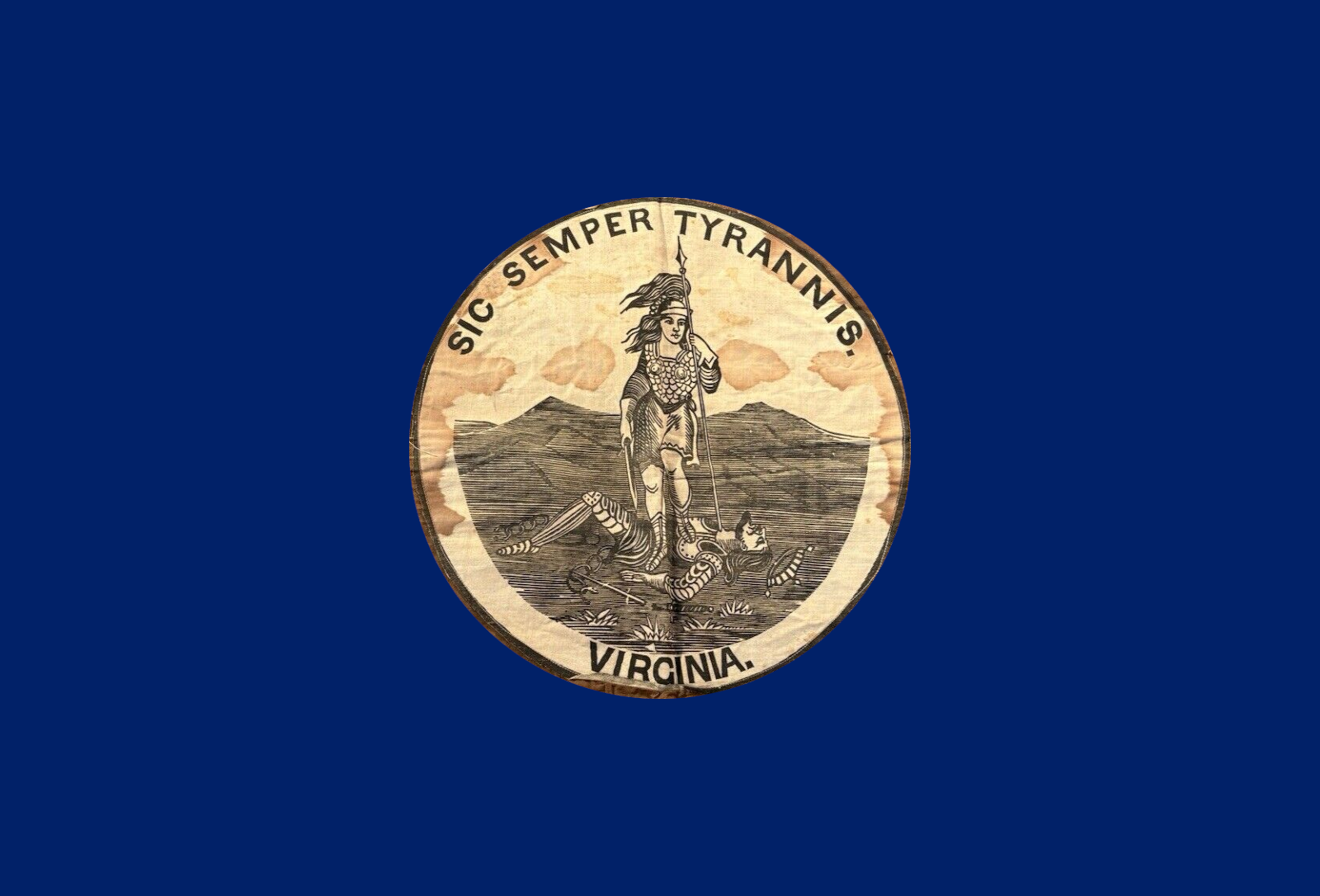
- November 7, 1905
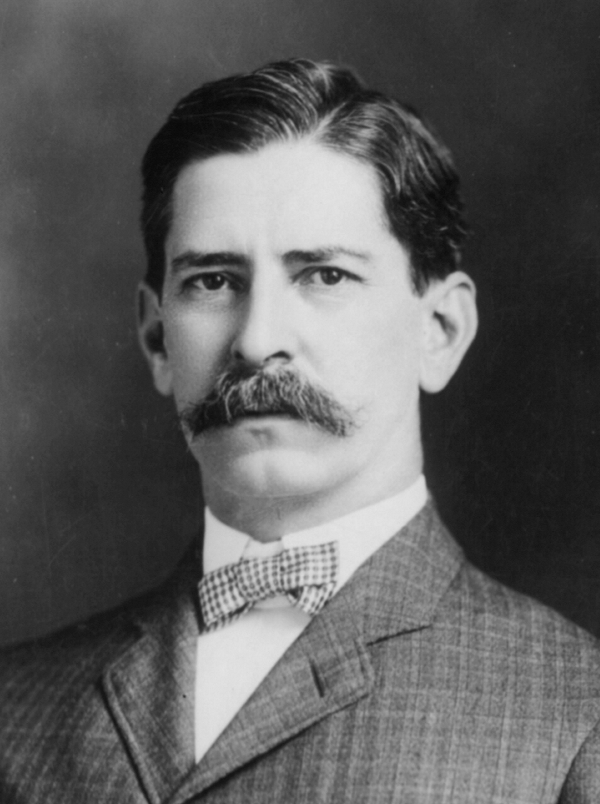

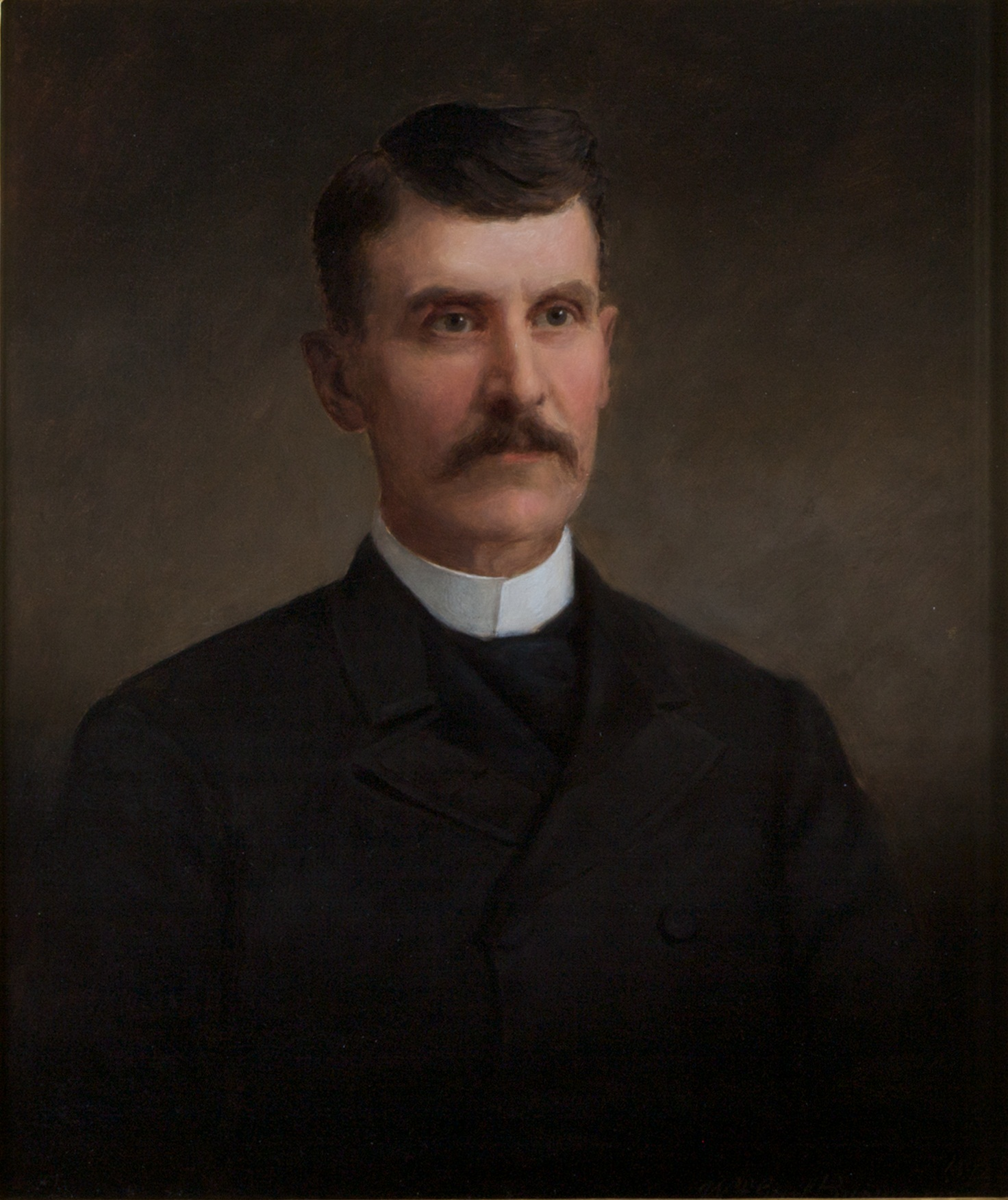
Nominee	Claude A. Swanson	Lunsford L. Lewis
Party	Democratic	Republican
Popular vote	84,235	45,815
Percentage	64.51%	35.09%
- County results Swanson: 50–60% 60–70% 70–80% 80–90% 90–100% Lewis: 40–50% 50–60% 60–70%
Governor before election
Andrew Jackson Montague
Democratic
Elected Governor
Claude A. Swanson
Democratic

The 1905 Virginia gubernatorial election was held on November 7, 1905, to elect the governor of Virginia.

== Results ==
Virginia gubernatorial election, 1905
Party	Candidate	Votes	%
Democratic	Claude A. Swanson	84,235	64.51%
Republican	Lunsford L. Lewis	45,815	35.09%
Socialist Labor	B. D. Downey	453	0.35%
Write-ins		77	0.06%
Total votes		130,580	100.00%
Democratic hold			
