= 1922 United States Senate election in Virginia =

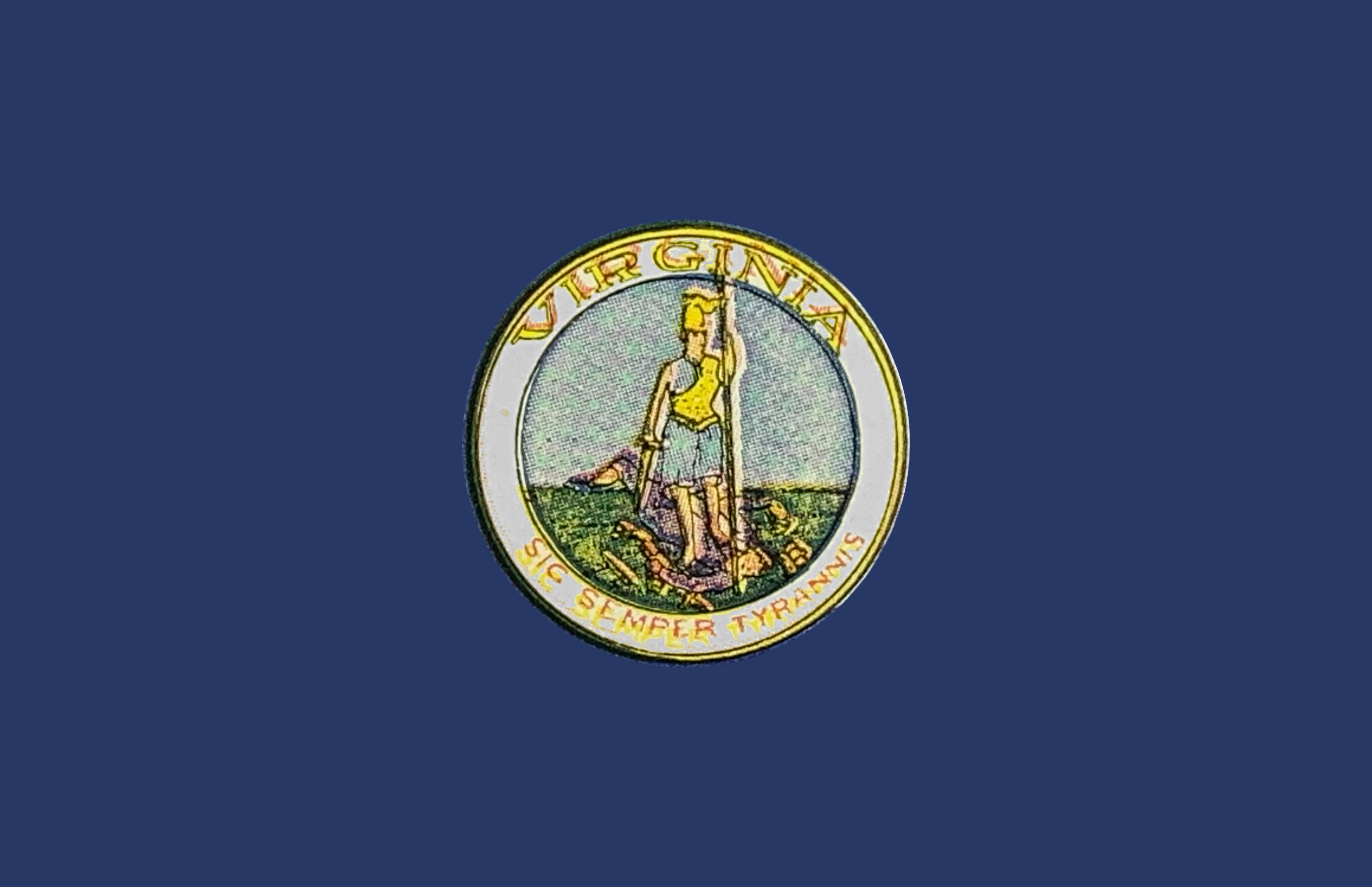
- November 7, 1922
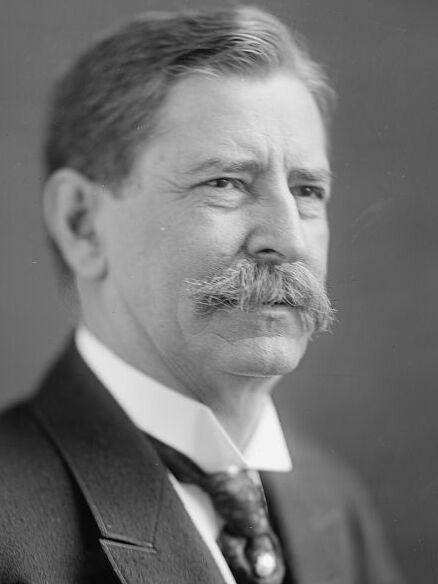

Nominee	Claude A. Swanson	J. W. McGavock
Party	Democratic	Republican
Popular vote	116,393	42,903
Percentage	71.88%	26.50%
U.S. senator before election
Claude A. Swanson
Democratic
Elected U.S. Senator
Claude A. Swanson
Democratic

The 1922 United States Senate election in Virginia was held on November 7, 1922. Incumbent Senator Claude A. Swanson was re-elected to a third term after defeating Republican J. W. McGavock. Swanson and fellow Senator Carter Glass were the first U.S. Senators to be elected by popular vote (Swanson ran unopposed in 1916) following the passage of the Seventeenth Amendment.

== Results ==
United States Senate election in Virginia, 1922
Party	Candidate	Votes	%	±%
Democratic	Claude A. Swanson (inc.)	116,393	71.88%	
Republican	J. W. McGavock	42,903	26.50%	
Independent	Matt N. Lewis	2,627	1.62%	
Majority		73,490	45.39%	
Turnout		161,923		
Democratic hold				

== See also ==
- United States Senate elections, 1922
