= Richard C. L. Moncure =

American judge

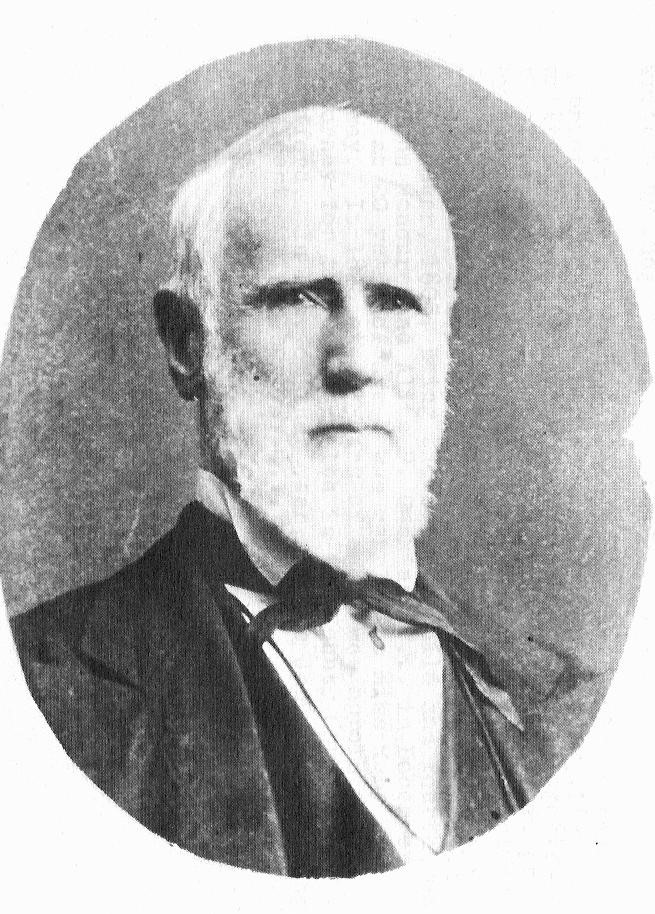

Justice of the Supreme Court of Virginia
- In office March 13, 1851 – August 24, 1882
- Preceded by: Francis T. Brooke
- Succeeded by: Lunsford L. Lewis

Personal details
- Born: December 11, 1805 Stafford County, Virginia, U.S.
- Died: August 24, 1882 (aged 76) Fredericksburg, Virginia, U.S.
- Spouse: Mary Butler Washington Conway (m. 1825)
- Children: 13
- Relatives: Richard Henry Lee Chichester (grandson)

Richard Cassius Lee Moncure (December 11, 1805 – August 24, 1882) was a Virginia politician and jurist, serving for more than 25 years on what became the Virginia Supreme Court.

== Early years ==
Born at the family estate "Clermont" in Stafford County, Virginia, in 1805 to one of the First Families of Virginia, Richard Cassius Lee Moncure was the great grandson of Rev. John Moncure, a Scottish Huguenot immigrant and longtime rector of Overwharton parish and friend of George Washington, George Mason and other founding fathers. His father and grandfather were both named John Moncure and active in the affairs of what was renamed Aquia Parish. His mother Alice Peachy Gaskins (1774-1860) bore ten children, of whom Richard Cassius Lee was the seventh child and fourth son. He received his early education in the local schools and read extensively.

== Career ==
After his admission to the bar in 1825, Moncure practiced in Fredericksburg and surrounding counties. In 1849, he entered politics and won election to the legislature, which was then engaged in extensive revision of the state's legal code. He was appointed to the Virginia Supreme Court of Appeals to replace Francis Taliaferro Brooke in 1851, but when the Virginia Constitution was changed that year, popular election to that court became required. Moncure was one of the five judges elected under that new Constitution. Although some questioned the validity of the wartime Constitution of 1864 (by delegates from Union-controlled areas, including Moncure's home Stafford County), Moncure also won election as one of three Court of Appeals judges elected under that constitution, and his fellows selected him as that Court's President in 1865.

Active on the vestry of St. George's Episcopal Church (Fredericksburg, Virginia) and in the Diocese of Virginia for four decades, Moncure held seven slaves during the 1850 census and 14 slaves during the 1860 census. Before the American Civil War, Moncure was a relative moderate on the appellate court, vehemently dissenting from the decisions in 'Bailey v. Poindexter's Executor,' 55 Va. 132, 14 Gratton 132 (1858) and 'Williamson v. Coalter,' 14 Gratton 394 (1858), both of which postdated the Dred Scott decision and declared testamentary manumissions void because a majority of Moncure's colleagues decided slaves were legally incapable of choosing freedom (although even preceding generations of Virginia judges, including John Marshall had used similar choice language in their wills).

His tenure of office was temporarily suspended, however, during the Reconstruction period, from 1866 to 1869, when Major General John Schofield enforced a federal law prohibiting men with a record of service to the Confederate States of America to hold public office. Virginia also adopted a new state Constitution in 1869 (with voter ratification) which unlike the 1851 Constitution prohibited slavery. It also re-instituted election of judges by the state legislature. Thus legislators again elected Judge Moncure to a twelve-year term in 1870, and his fellows again selected him as the Court's President.

== Family ==
He married Mary Washington Conway (1807-1890) on December 29, 1825, and that year also bought Glencairne Farm, at which the couple lived the rest of their lives. They had thirteen children, eleven surviving to adulthood. At least three of their sons served as Confederate officers (John Conway Moncure, Thomas Gascoigne Moncure and Walter Peyton Moncure) the eldest of whom became Speaker of the Louisiana house and judge in Shreveport, Louisiana. His grandson Richard Henry Lee Chichester also became a justice of the Virginia Supreme Court.

== Death and legacy ==
Judge Moncure remained on the Court of Appeals until his death, at his home on August 26, 1882. He is buried in the estate's graveyard, although further generations of his descendants are buried at Aquia Church cemetery.
