= Dick Davis (politician) =

American politician

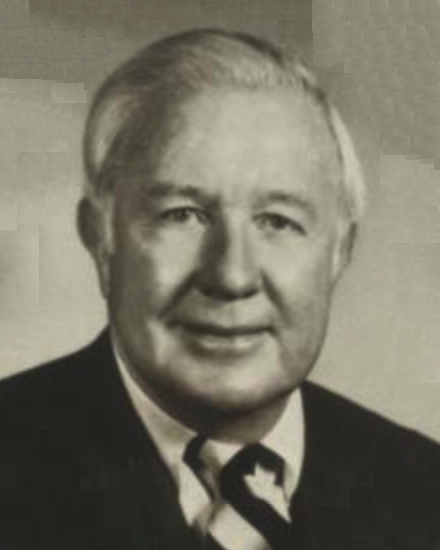
- Davis, circa 1984

34th Lieutenant Governor of Virginia
- In office January 16, 1982 – January 18, 1986
- Governor: Chuck Robb
- Preceded by: Chuck Robb
- Succeeded by: Douglas Wilder

Chair of the Democratic Party of Virginia
- In office June 14, 1985 – May 10, 1986
- Preceded by: Alan Diamonstein
- Succeeded by: Larry Framme
- In office 1979–1980
- Preceded by: Joseph T. Fitzpatrick
- Succeeded by: Owen B. Pickett

Mayor of Portsmouth, Virginia
- In office 1974–1980
- Preceded by: Jack P. Barnes
- Succeeded by: Julian E. Johansen

Personal details
- Born: Richard Joseph Davis Jr. August 7, 1921 Portsmouth, Virginia, U.S.
- Died: March 4, 1999 (aged 77) Portsmouth, Virginia, U.S.
- Party: Democratic
- Spouse(s): Martha Whitfield; Lori Collins
- Education: College of William & Mary; University of Virginia

Military service
- Allegiance: United States
- Branch/service: United States Marine Corps
- Years of service: 1942–1946; 1950–1952
- Rank: Major
- Battles/wars: World War II; Korean War

Richard Joseph Davis Jr. (August 7, 1921 – March 4, 1999) was an American politician who was the 34th lieutenant governor of Virginia from 1982 to 1986 serving under Governor Chuck Robb. A former mayor of Portsmouth, Virginia, Davis' 1981 election as Lieutenant Governor saw him win 8 of the 10 Congressional Districts composing Virginia in 1981; his statewide margin of victory over Republican state senator Nathan H. Miller was 150,000 votes. Davis was the first Catholic elected to a statewide office in Virginia history.

== Early life and education ==
Richard Joseph Davis Jr. was born on August 7, 1921, in Portsmouth, Virginia. Davis' father had invested much of the family's money in the stock market during the 1920s. Davis' family was Irish Catholic, and during Al Smith's 1928 presidential campaign the Ku Klux Klan burned a cross on the porch of his family home. That same year, his father died at age 52. A few years later, five of the six banks in Portsmouth closed, and since the stock Davis' father had invested in was assessable, the family lost much of its money. Because of this, Davis had to work odd jobs to help support his family.

In 1938, Davis began attending the College of William & Mary. In college, Davis worked as a waiter in the dining hall, and by his junior year he was headwaiter.

Davis attended law school at the University of Virginia.

== Career ==
Following his graduation from William & Mary, Davis served in the United States Marine Corps from 1942 to 1946, having been promoted to captain in 1945. He remained in the Marine Corps Reserve and was called up for service during the Korean War in 1950, serving until 1952. Davis became a successful mortgage banker with the help of his father-in-law.

Davis later attended law school, graduating from the University of Virginia School of Law. As a new lawyer, he was mentored by politician William Spong Jr., a fellow Portsmouth citizen.

Davis ran for Portsmouth City Council and then for mayor after a group of local businessmen recruited him to help save the city. Davis started his term as mayor in 1974. At the time, the city had a deficit of $3 million. By the time Davis left office, the city had $3 million in unappropriated funds. In 1978, Davis became Democratic State Chairman of Virginia.

Davis ran for Lieutenant Governor in the 1981 election alongside Chuck Robb. He won eight out of the ten Congressional Districts at the time. His statewide margin of victory over Republican state senator Nathan H. Miller was 150,000 votes. Davis was the first Catholic elected to a statewide office in Virginia history. Davis would remain the only statewide Catholic elected in Virginia history until the 2001 Virginia General Elections, when Tim Kaine was elected lieutenant governor, the same office Davis once held. Four years later, in the 2005 Virginia General elections, history was made again when Kaine won the governor's race and Bob McDonnell won the attorney general's race. The elections of Kaine and McDonnell created a new record in Virginia history at that time: two Catholics elected to statewide offices. Davis was a supporter of the Equal Rights Amendment.

While Lieutenant Governor, Davis served in the executive branch with two fellow Democrats: Attorney General Gerald Baliles, who would be elected governor in 1985; and Governor Chuck Robb, who had preceded Davis as lieutenant governor.

In 1982, Davis ran for the United States Senate after no other Democratic candidate stepped up, despite the fact that he wanted to be Governor instead. Davis narrowly lost to Republican candidate Paul S. Trible Jr. At the time, Davis' net worth was $2.5 million.

In 1985, Davis ran for Governor. In a January 1985 poll, Davis was ranked ninth out of twenty-two candidates. He lost the election.

== Personal life ==
Davis owned the Tidewater Sharks in the Southern Hockey League from 1975 to 1977. His son, Richard Davis III, is a lawyer in Portsmouth.

Political offices
| Preceded by Chuck Robb | Lieutenant Governor of Virginia; 1982–1986 | Succeeded by Douglas Wilder |
Party political offices
| Preceded by Elmo Zumwalt | Democratic nominee for U.S. Senator from Virginia (Class 1); 1982 | Succeeded by Chuck Robb |
