= Swansonville, Virginia =

Unincorporated community in Virginia, US

Coordinates: 36.73653°N 79.57892°W

Swansonville is an unincorporated community in Pittsylvania County, in the U.S. state of Virginia.
