= List of United States representatives in the 98th Congress =

This is a complete list of United States representatives during the 98th United States Congress listed by seniority.

As an historical article, the districts and party affiliations listed reflect those during the 98th Congress (January 3, 1983 – January 3, 1985). Seats and party affiliations on similar lists for other congresses will be different for certain members.

Seniority depends on the date on which members were sworn into office. Since many members are sworn in on the same day, subsequent ranking is based on previous congressional service of the individual and then by alphabetical order by the last name of the representative.

Committee chairmanship in the House is often associated with seniority. However, party leadership is typically not associated with seniority.

Note: The "*" indicates that the representative/delegate may have served one or more non-consecutive terms while in the House of Representatives of the United States Congress.

== U.S. House seniority list ==
U.S. House seniority
Rank	Representative	Party	District	Seniority date (Previous service, if any)	No.# of term(s)	Notes
1	Jamie Whitten	D	MS-01	November 4, 1941	22nd term	Dean of the House
2	Charles Melvin Price	D	IL-21	January 3, 1945	20th term	
3	Charles Edward Bennett	D	FL-03	January 3, 1949	18th term	
4	Carl D. Perkins	D	KY-07	January 3, 1949	18th term	Died on August 3, 1984.
5	Peter W. Rodino	D	NJ-10	January 3, 1949	18th term	
6	Clement J. Zablocki	D	WI-04	January 3, 1949	18th term	Died on December 3, 1983.
7	Edward Boland	D	MA-02	January 3, 1953	16th term	
8	Jack Brooks	D	TX-09	January 3, 1953	16th term	
9	Tip O'Neill	D	MA-08	January 3, 1953	16th term	Speaker of the House
10	William Natcher	D	KY-02	August 1, 1953	16th term	
11	Dante Fascell	D	FL-19	January 3, 1955	15th term	
12	Jim Wright	D	TX-12	January 3, 1955	15th term	
13	John Dingell	D	MI-16	December 13, 1955	15th term	
14	William Broomfield	R	MI-18	January 3, 1957	14th term	
15	Robert Michel	R	IL-18	January 3, 1957	14th term	
16	Silvio O. Conte	R	MA-01	January 3, 1959	13th term	
17	Robert Kastenmeier	D	WI-02	January 3, 1959	13th term	
18	Del Latta	R	OH-05	January 3, 1959	13th term	
19	Dan Rostenkowski	D	IL-08	January 3, 1959	13th term	
20	Neal Smith	D	IA-04	January 3, 1959	13th term	
21	Samuel S. Stratton	D	NY-23	January 3, 1959	13th term	
22	Joseph Patrick Addabbo	D	NY-06	January 3, 1961	12th term	
23	Fernand St. Germain	D	RI-01	January 3, 1961	12th term	
24	Mo Udall	D	AZ-02	May 2, 1961	12th term	
25	Henry B. González	D	TX-20	November 4, 1961	12th term	
26	Benjamin S. Rosenthal	D	NY-07	February 20, 1962	12th term	Died on January 4, 1983.
27	Jim Broyhill	R	NC-10	January 3, 1963	11th term	
28	Don Edwards	D	CA-10	January 3, 1963	11th term	
29	Don Fuqua	D	FL-02	January 3, 1963	11th term	
30	Sam Gibbons	D	FL-07	January 3, 1963	11th term	
31	Augustus F. Hawkins	D	CA-29	January 3, 1963	11th term	
32	Frank Horton	R	NY-29	January 3, 1963	11th term	
33	Clarence Long	D	MD-02	January 3, 1963	11th term	Left the House in 1985.
34	Joseph McDade	R	PA-10	January 3, 1963	11th term	
35	Joseph Minish	D	NJ-11	January 3, 1963	11th term	Left the House in 1985.
36	Claude Pepper	D	FL-18	January 3, 1963	11th term	
37	Jimmy Quillen	R	TN-01	January 3, 1963	11th term	
38	Edward R. Roybal	D	CA-25	January 3, 1963	11th term	
39	J. J. Pickle	D	TX-10	December 21, 1963	11th term	
40	Phillip Burton	D	CA-05	February 18, 1964	11th term	Died on April 10, 1983.
41	Frank Annunzio	D	IL-11	January 3, 1965	10th term	
42	Barber Conable	R	NY-30	January 3, 1965	10th term	Left the House in 1985.
43	John Conyers	D	MI-01	January 3, 1965	10th term	
44	Bill Dickinson	R	AL-02	January 3, 1965	10th term	
45	John Duncan, Sr.	R	TN-02	January 3, 1965	10th term	
46	Jack Edwards	R	AL-01	January 3, 1965	10th term	Left the House in 1985.
47	John N. Erlenborn	R	IL-13	January 3, 1965	10th term	Left the House in 1985.
48	Tom Foley	D	WA-05	January 3, 1965	10th term	
49	William Ford	D	MI-15	January 3, 1965	10th term	
50	Kika De la Garza	D	TX-15	January 3, 1965	10th term	
51	Lee Hamilton	D	IN-09	January 3, 1965	10th term	
52	James J. Howard	D	NJ-03	January 3, 1965	10th term	
53	Sidney Yates	D	IL-09	January 3, 1965; Previous service, 1949–1963.	17th term*	
54	Walter B. Jones, Sr.	D	NC-01	February 5, 1966	10th term	
55	Guy Vander Jagt	R	MI-09	November 8, 1966	10th term	
56	Tom Bevill	D	AL-04	January 3, 1967	9th term	
57	John Paul Hammerschmidt	R	AR-03	January 3, 1967	9th term	
58	Abraham Kazen	D	TX-23	January 3, 1967	9th term	Left the House in 1985.
59	Clarence E. Miller	R	OH-10	January 3, 1967	9th term	
60	Sonny Montgomery	D	MS-03	January 3, 1967	9th term	
61	John Myers	R	IN-07	January 3, 1967	9th term	
62	Bill Nichols	D	AL-03	January 3, 1967	9th term	
63	Gene Snyder	R	KY-04	January 3, 1967; Previous service, 1963–1965.	10th term*	
64	Larry Winn	R	KS-03	January 3, 1967	9th term	Left the House in 1985.
65	Chalmers Wylie	R	OH-15	January 3, 1967	9th term	
66	Joseph M. Gaydos	D	PA-20	November 5, 1968	9th term	
67	Bill Alexander	D	AR-01	January 3, 1969	8th term	
68	Glenn M. Anderson	D	CA-32	January 3, 1969	8th term	
69	Mario Biaggi	D	NY-19	January 3, 1969	8th term	
70	William V. Chappell, Jr.	D	FL-04	January 3, 1969	8th term	
71	Bill Clay	D	MO-01	January 3, 1969	8th term	
72	Lawrence Coughlin	R	PA-13	January 3, 1969	8th term	
73	Dan Daniel	D	VA-05	January 3, 1969	8th term	
74	Hamilton Fish	R	NY-21	January 3, 1969	8th term	
75	Manuel Lujan, Jr.	R	NM-01	January 3, 1969	8th term	
76	Louis Stokes	D	OH-21	January 3, 1969	8th term	
77	G. William Whitehurst	R	VA-02	January 3, 1969	8th term	
78	Gus Yatron	D	PA-06	January 3, 1969	8th term	
79	Ed Jones	D	TN-08	March 25, 1969	8th term	
80	Dave Obey	D	WI-07	April 1, 1969	8th term	
81	Robert A. Roe	D	NJ-08	November 4, 1969	8th term	
82	Phil Crane	R	IL-12	November 25, 1969	8th term	
83	Edwin B. Forsythe	R	NJ-13	November 3, 1970	8th term	Died on March 29, 1984.
84	Bill Archer	R	TX-07	January 3, 1971	7th term	
85	Les Aspin	D	WI-01	January 3, 1971	7th term	
86	Ron Dellums	D	CA-08	January 3, 1971	7th term	
87	Bill Frenzel	R	MN-03	January 3, 1971	7th term	
88	Elwood Hillis	R	IN-05	January 3, 1971	7th term	
89	Jack Kemp	R	NY-31	January 3, 1971	7th term	
90	Norman F. Lent	R	NY-04	January 3, 1971	7th term	
91	Romano Mazzoli	D	KY-03	January 3, 1971	7th term	
92	Stewart McKinney	R	CT-04	January 3, 1971	7th term	
93	Parren Mitchell	D	MD-07	January 3, 1971	7th term	
94	Charles B. Rangel	D	NY-16	January 3, 1971	7th term	
95	J. Kenneth Robinson	R	VA-07	January 3, 1971	7th term	Left the House in 1985.
96	John F. Seiberling	D	OH-14	January 3, 1971	7th term	
97	Floyd Spence	R	SC-02	January 3, 1971	7th term	
98	Bill Young	R	FL-08	January 3, 1971	7th term	
99	John Breaux	D	LA-07	September 30, 1972	7th term	
100	Ike F. Andrews	D	NC-04	January 3, 1973	6th term	Left the House in 1985.
101	George Brown, Jr.	D	CA-36	January 3, 1973; Previous service, 1963–1971.	10th term*	
102	Benjamin A. Gilman	R	NY-22	January 3, 1973	6th term	
103	Marjorie Holt	R	MD-04	January 3, 1973	6th term	
104	James Robert Jones	D	OK-01	January 3, 1973	6th term	
105	William Lehman	D	FL-17	January 3, 1973	6th term	
106	Trent Lott	R	MS-05	January 3, 1973	6th term	
107	Gillis W. Long	D	LA-08	January 3, 1973; Previous service, 1963–1965.	7th term*	
108	Edward Rell Madigan	R	IL-15	January 3, 1973	6th term	
109	James G. Martin	R	NC-09	January 3, 1973	6th term	Left the House in 1985.
110	Joe Moakley	D	MA-09	January 3, 1973	6th term	
111	Carlos Moorhead	R	CA-22	January 3, 1973	6th term	
112	George M. O'Brien	R	IL-04	January 3, 1973	6th term	
113	Joel Pritchard	R	WA-01	January 3, 1973	6th term	Left the House in 1985.
114	Ralph Regula	R	OH-16	January 3, 1973	6th term	
115	Matthew John Rinaldo	R	NJ-07	January 3, 1973	6th term	
116	Charlie Rose	D	NC-07	January 3, 1973	6th term	
117	Patricia Schroeder	D	CO-01	January 3, 1973	6th term	
118	Bud Shuster	R	PA-09	January 3, 1973	6th term	
119	Pete Stark	D	CA-09	January 3, 1973	6th term	
120	Gerry Studds	D	MA-10	January 3, 1973	6th term	
121	Gene Taylor	R	MO-07	January 3, 1973	6th term	
122	Charles Wilson	D	TX-02	January 3, 1973	6th terms	
123	Don Young	R	AK	March 6, 1973	6th Terms	
124	Lindy Boggs	D	LA-02	March 20, 1973	6th term	
125	Cardiss Collins	D	IL-07	June 5, 1973	6th term	
126	John Murtha	D	PA-12	February 5, 1974	6th term	
127	Robert J. Lagomarsino	R	CA-19	March 5, 1974	6th term	
128	J. Bob Traxler	D	MI-08	April 23, 1974	6th term	
129	Les AuCoin	D	OR-01	January 3, 1975	5th term	
130	Berkley Bedell	D	IA-06	January 3, 1975	5th term	
131	Don Bonker	D	WA-03	January 3, 1975	5th term	
132	Butler Derrick	D	SC-03	January 3, 1975	5th term	
133	Thomas Downey	D	NY-02	January 3, 1975	5th term	
134	Norman D'Amours	D	NH-01	January 3, 1975	5th term	Left the House in 1985.
135	Joseph D. Early	D	MA-03	January 3, 1975	5th term	
136	Robert W. Edgar	D	PA-07	January 3, 1975	5th term	
137	Glenn English	D	OK-06	January 3, 1975	5th term	
138	James Florio	D	NJ-01	January 3, 1975	5th term	
139	Harold Ford	D	TN-09	January 3, 1975	5th term	
140	Bill Goodling	R	PA-19	January 3, 1975	5th term	
141	Bill Gradison	R	OH-02	January 3, 1975	5th term	
142	George V. Hansen	R	ID-02	January 3, 1975; Previous service, 1965–1969.	7th term*	Left the House in 1985.
143	Tom Harkin	D	IA-05	January 3, 1975	5th term	Left the House in 1985.
144	Bill Hefner	D	NC-08	January 3, 1975	5th term	
145	Jack English Hightower	D	TX-13	January 3, 1975	5th term	Left the House in 1985.
146	Carroll Hubbard	D	KY-01	January 3, 1975	5th term	
147	William Hughes	D	NJ-02	January 3, 1975	5th term	
148	Henry Hyde	R	IL-06	January 3, 1975	5th term	
149	Andrew Jacobs, Jr.	D	IN-10	January 3, 1975; Previous service, 1965–1973.	9th term*	
150	Jim Jeffords	R	VT	January 3, 1975	5th term	
151	Tom Kindness	R	OH-08	January 3, 1975	5th term	
152	John LaFalce	D	NY-32	January 3, 1975	5th term	
153	Elliott H. Levitas	D	GA-04	January 3, 1975	5th term	Left the House in 1985.
154	Marilyn Lloyd	D	TN-03	January 3, 1975	5th term	
155	Larry McDonald	D	GA-07	January 3, 1975	5th term	Died on September 1, 1983.
156	Matthew F. McHugh	D	NY-28	January 3, 1975	5th term	
157	George Miller	D	CA-07	January 3, 1975	5th term	
158	Norman Mineta	D	CA-13	January 3, 1975	5th term	
159	Henson Moore	R	LA-06	January 3, 1975	5th term	
160	Stephen Neal	D	NC-05	January 3, 1975	5th term	
161	Henry J. Nowak	D	NY-33	January 3, 1975	5th term	
162	Jim Oberstar	D	MN-08	January 3, 1975	5th term	
163	Richard Ottinger	D	NY-20	January 3, 1975; Previous service, 1965–1971.	8th term*	Left the House in 1985.
164	Jerry M. Patterson	D	CA-38	January 3, 1975	5th term	Left the House in 1985.
165	Marty Russo	D	IL-03	January 3, 1975	5th term	
166	James H. Scheuer	D	NY-08	January 3, 1975; Previous service, 1965–1973.	9th term*	
167	Richard T. Schulze	R	PA-05	January 3, 1975	5th term	
168	Philip Sharp	D	IN-02	January 3, 1975	5th term	
169	Paul Simon	D	IL-22	January 3, 1975	5th term	Left the House in 1985.
170	Virginia D. Smith	R	NE-03	January 3, 1975	5th term	
171	Stephen J. Solarz	D	NY-13	January 3, 1975	5th term	
172	Henry Waxman	D	CA-24	January 3, 1975	5th term	
173	Jim Weaver	D	OR-04	January 3, 1975	5th term	
174	Tim Wirth	D	CO-02	January 3, 1975	5th term	
175	Stan Lundine	D	NY-34	March 2, 1976	5th term	
176	Sam B. Hall, Jr.	D	TX-01	June 19, 1976	5th term	
177	Earl Thomas Coleman	R	MO-06	November 2, 1976	5th term	
178	Ed Markey	D	MA-07	November 2, 1976	5th term	
179	Daniel Akaka	D	HI-02	January 3, 1977	4th term	
180	Douglas Applegate	D	OH-18	January 3, 1977	4th term	
181	Robert Badham	R	CA-40	January 3, 1977	4th term	
182	Doug Barnard, Jr.	D	GA-10	January 3, 1977	4th term	
183	Anthony C. Beilenson	D	CA-23	January 3, 1977	4th term	
184	David Bonior	D	MI-12	January 3, 1977	4th term	
185	Tom Corcoran	R	IL-14	January 3, 1977	4th term	Resigned on November 28, 1984.
186	Norm Dicks	D	WA-06	January 3, 1977	4th term	
187	Mickey Edwards	R	OK-05	January 3, 1977	4th term	
188	Ronnie Flippo	D	AL-05	January 3, 1977	4th term	
189	Dick Gephardt	D	MO-03	January 3, 1977	4th term	
190	Dan Glickman	D	KS-04	January 3, 1977	4th term	
191	Al Gore	D	TN-06	January 3, 1977	4th term	Left the House in 1985.
192	Cecil Heftel	D	HI-01	January 3, 1977	4th term	
193	Jerry Huckaby	D	LA-05	January 3, 1977	4th term	
194	Andy Ireland	D	FL-10	January 3, 1977	4th term	
195	Ed Jenkins	D	GA-09	January 3, 1977	4th term	
196	Dale Kildee	D	MI-07	January 3, 1977	4th term	
197	Jim Leach	R	IA-01	January 3, 1977	4th term	
198	Tom Luken	D	OH-01	January 3, 1977; Previous service, 1974–1975.	5th term*	
199	Ron Marlenee	R	MT-02	January 3, 1977	4th term	
200	David D. Marriott	R	UT-02	January 3, 1977	4th term	Left the House in 1985.
201	Barbara Mikulski	D	MD-03	January 3, 1977	4th term	
202	Austin Murphy	D	PA-22	January 3, 1977	4th term	
203	Mary Rose Oakar	D	OH-20	January 3, 1977	4th term	
204	Leon Panetta	D	CA-16	January 3, 1977	4th term	
205	Donald J. Pease	D	OH-13	January 3, 1977	4th term	
206	Carl Pursell	R	MI-02	January 3, 1977	4th term	
207	Nick Rahall	D	WV-04	January 3, 1977	4th term	
208	Eldon Rudd	R	AZ-04	January 3, 1977	4th term	
209	Harold S. Sawyer	R	MI-05	January 3, 1977	4th term	Left the House in 1985.
210	Ike Skelton	D	MO-04	January 3, 1977	4th term	
211	Bob Stump	R	AZ-03	January 3, 1977	4th term	
212	Bruce Vento	D	MN-04	January 3, 1977	4th term	
213	Harold Volkmer	D	MO-09	January 3, 1977	4th term	
214	Robert Walker	R	PA-16	January 3, 1977	4th term	
215	Doug Walgren	D	PA-18	January 3, 1977	4th term	
216	Wes Watkins	D	OK-03	January 3, 1977	4th term	
217	Theodore S. Weiss	D	NY-17	January 3, 1977	4th term	
218	Charles Whitley	D	NC-03	January 3, 1977	4th term	
219	Robert A. Young	D	MO-02	January 3, 1977	4th term	
220	Arlan Stangeland	R	MN-07	February 22, 1977	4th term	
221	Wyche Fowler	D	GA-05	April 6, 1977	4th term	
222	Bob Livingston	R	LA-01	August 27, 1977	4th term	
223	S. William Green	R	NY-15	February 14, 1978	4th term	
224	Robert Garcia	D	NY-18	February 21, 1978	4th term	
225	Donald J. Albosta	D	MI-10	January 3, 1979	3rd term	Left the House in 1985.
226	Beryl Anthony, Jr.	D	AR-04	January 3, 1979	3rd term	
227	Michael D. Barnes	D	MD-08	January 3, 1979	3rd term	
228	Doug Bereuter	R	NE-01	January 3, 1979	3rd term	
229	Ed Bethune	R	AR-02	January 3, 1979	3rd term	Left the House in 1985.
230	Bill Boner	D	TN-05	January 3, 1979	3rd term	
231	Beverly Byron	D	MD-06	January 3, 1979	3rd term	
232	Carroll A. Campbell, Jr.	R	SC-04	January 3, 1979	3rd term	
233	William Carney	R	NY-01	January 3, 1979	3rd term	
234	Dick Cheney	R	WY	January 3, 1979	3rd term	
235	Bill Clinger	R	PA-23	January 3, 1979	3rd term	
236	Tony Coelho	D	CA-15	January 3, 1979	3rd term	
237	Jim Courter	R	NJ-12	January 3, 1979	3rd term	
238	Dan Crane	R	IL-19	January 3, 1979	3rd term	Left the House in 1985.
239	William E. Dannemeyer	R	CA-39	January 3, 1979	3rd term	
240	Thomas Daschle	D	SD	January 3, 1979	3rd term	
241	Robert William Davis	R	MI-11	January 3, 1979	3rd term	
242	Julian C. Dixon	D	CA-28	January 3, 1979	3rd term	
243	Brian J. Donnelly	D	MA-11	January 3, 1979	3rd term	
244	Vic Fazio	D	CA-04	January 3, 1979	3rd term	
245	Geraldine Ferraro	D	NY-09	January 3, 1979	3rd term	Left the House in 1985.
246	Martin Frost	D	TX-24	January 3, 1979	3rd term	
247	Newt Gingrich	R	GA-06	January 3, 1979	3rd term	
248	Phil Gramm	D	TX-06	January 3, 1979	3rd term	Resigned on January 5, 1983. Returned to the House on February 12, 1983. Left the House in 1985.
249	William H. Gray	D	PA-02	January 3, 1979	3rd term	
250	Frank Joseph Guarini	D	NJ-14	January 3, 1979	3rd term	
251	Tony Hall	D	OH-03	January 3, 1979	3rd term	
252	Kent Hance	D	TX-19	January 3, 1979	3rd term	Left the House in 1985.
253	Larry J. Hopkins	R	KY-06	January 3, 1979	3rd term	
254	Earl Dewitt Hutto	D	FL-01	January 3, 1979	3rd term	
255	Raymond P. Kogovsek	D	CO-03	January 3, 1979	3rd term	Left the House in 1985.
256	Ken Kramer	R	CO-05	January 3, 1979	3rd term	
257	Marvin Leath	D	TX-11	January 3, 1979	3rd term	
258	Mickey Leland	D	TX-18	January 3, 1979	3rd term	
259	Jerry Lewis	R	CA-35	January 3, 1979	3rd term	
260	Tom Loeffler	R	TX-21	January 3, 1979	3rd term	
261	Mike Lowry	D	WA-07	January 3, 1979	3rd term	
262	Dan Lungren	R	CA-42	January 3, 1979	3rd term	
263	Bob Matsui	D	CA-03	January 3, 1979	3rd term	
264	Nicholas Mavroules	D	MA-06	January 3, 1979	3rd term	
265	Dan Mica	D	FL-14	January 3, 1979	3rd term	
266	Bill Nelson	D	FL-11	January 3, 1979	3rd term	
267	Chip Pashayan	R	CA-17	January 3, 1979	3rd term	
268	Ron Paul	R	TX-22	January 3, 1979; Previous service, 1976–1977.	4th term*	Left the House in 1985.
269	William R. Ratchford	D	CT-05	January 3, 1979	3rd term	Left the House in 1985.
270	Donald L. Ritter	R	PA-15	January 3, 1979	3rd term	
271	Toby Roth	R	WI-08	January 3, 1979	3rd term	
272	Martin Olav Sabo	D	MN-05	January 3, 1979	3rd term	
273	James Sensenbrenner	R	WI-09	January 3, 1979	3rd term	
274	James Shannon	D	MA-05	January 3, 1979	3rd term	Left the House in 1985.
275	Richard Shelby	D	AL-07	January 3, 1979	3rd term	
276	Norman D. Shumway	R	CA-14	January 3, 1979	3rd term	
277	Olympia Snowe	R	ME-02	January 3, 1979	3rd term	
278	Gerald Solomon	R	NY-24	January 3, 1979	3rd term	
279	Charles Stenholm	D	TX-17	January 3, 1979	3rd term	
280	Al Swift	D	WA-02	January 3, 1979	3rd term	
281	Mike Synar	D	OK-02	January 3, 1979	3rd term	
282	Tom Tauke	R	IA-02	January 3, 1979	3rd term	
283	Bill Thomas	R	CA-20	January 3, 1979	3rd term	
284	Bob Whittaker	R	KS-05	January 3, 1979	3rd term	
285	Pat Williams	D	MT-01	January 3, 1979	3rd term	
286	Lyle Williams	R	OH-17	January 3, 1979	3rd term	Left the House in 1985.
287	Howard Wolpe	D	MI-03	January 3, 1979	3rd term	
288	Tom Petri	R	WI-06	April 3, 1979	3rd term	
289	John Porter	R	IL-10	January 22, 1980	3rd term	
290	Billy Tauzin	D	LA-03	May 22, 1980	3rd term	
291	George W. Crockett, Jr.	D	MI-13	November 4, 1980	3rd term	
292	Thomas Bliley	R	VA-03	January 3, 1981	2nd term	
293	Hank Brown	R	CO-04	January 3, 1981	2nd term	
294	Eugene A. Chappie	R	CA-02	January 3, 1981	2nd term	
295	Dan Coats	R	IN-04	January 3, 1981	2nd term	
296	Larry Craig	R	ID-01	January 3, 1981	2nd term	
297	William Coyne	D	PA-14	January 3, 1981	2nd term	
298	Hal Daub	R	NE-02	January 3, 1981	2nd term	
299	David Dreier	R	CA-33	January 3, 1981	2nd term	
300	Byron Dorgan	D	ND	January 3, 1981	2nd term	
301	Bernard J. Dwyer	D	NJ-06	January 3, 1981	2nd term	
302	Mervyn M. Dymally	D	CA-31	January 3, 1981	2nd term	
303	Roy Dyson	D	MD-01	January 3, 1981	2nd term	
304	Dennis E. Eckart	D	OH-11	January 3, 1981	2nd term	
305	Bill Emerson	R	MO-08	January 3, 1981	2nd term	
306	T. Cooper Evans	R	IA-03	January 3, 1981	2nd term	
307	Bobbi Fiedler	R	CA-21	January 3, 1981	2nd term	
308	Jack Fields	R	TX-08	January 3, 1981	2nd term	
309	Tom Foglietta	D	PA-01	January 3, 1981	2nd term	
310	Barney Frank	D	MA-04	January 3, 1981	2nd term	
311	Sam Gejdenson	D	CT-02	January 3, 1981	2nd term	
312	Judd Gregg	R	NH-02	January 3, 1981	2nd term	
313	Steve Gunderson	R	WI-03	January 3, 1981	2nd term	
314	Ralph Hall	D	TX-04	January 3, 1981	2nd term	
315	James Hansen	R	UT-01	January 3, 1981	2nd term	
316	Thomas F. Hartnett	R	SC-01	January 3, 1981	2nd term	
317	Charles Floyd Hatcher	D	GA-02	January 3, 1981	2nd term	
318	Dennis M. Hertel	D	MI-14	January 3, 1981	2nd term	
319	John P. Hiler	R	IN-03	January 3, 1981	2nd term	
320	Duncan Hunter	R	CA-45	January 3, 1981	2nd term	
321	Tom Lantos	D	CA-11	January 3, 1981	2nd term	
322	Bill Lowery	R	CA-41	January 3, 1981	2nd term	
323	David O'Brien Martin	R	NY-26	January 3, 1981	2nd term	
324	Lynn Morley Martin	R	IL-16	January 3, 1981	2nd term	
325	Bill McCollum	R	FL-05	January 3, 1981	2nd term	
326	Dave McCurdy	D	OK-04	January 3, 1981	2nd term	
327	Raymond J. McGrath	R	NY-05	January 3, 1981	2nd term	
328	Bob McEwen	R	OH-06	January 3, 1981	2nd term	
329	Guy Molinari	R	NY-14	January 3, 1981	2nd term	
330	Sid Morrison	R	WA-04	January 3, 1981	2nd term	
331	Stanford Parris	R	VA-08	January 3, 1981; Previous service, 1973–1975.	3rd term*	
332	William Neff Patman	D	TX-14	January 3, 1981	2nd term	Left the House in 1985.
333	Pat Roberts	R	KS-01	January 3, 1981	2nd term	
334	Buddy Roemer	D	LA-04	January 3, 1981	2nd term	
335	Hal Rogers	R	KY-05	January 3, 1981	2nd term	
336	Marge Roukema	R	NJ-05	January 3, 1981	2nd term	
337	Gus Savage	D	IL-02	January 3, 1981	2nd term	
338	Claudine Schneider	R	RI-02	January 3, 1981	2nd term	
339	Chuck Schumer	D	NY-10	January 3, 1981	2nd term	
340	E. Clay Shaw, Jr.	R	FL-15	January 3, 1981	2nd term	
341	Joe Skeen	R	NM-02	January 3, 1981	2nd term	
342	Christopher Smith	R	NJ-04	January 3, 1981	2nd term	
343	Denny Smith	R	OR-05	January 3, 1981	2nd term	
344	Harold Washington	D	IL-01	January 3, 1981	2nd term	Resigned on April 30, 1983.
345	Vin Weber	R	MN-02	January 3, 1981	2nd term	
346	Frank Wolf	R	VA-10	January 3, 1981	2nd term	
347	George C. Wortley	R	NY-27	January 3, 1981	2nd term	
348	Ron Wyden	D	OR-03	January 3, 1981	2nd term	
349	Mark D. Siljander	R	MI-04	April 21, 1981	2nd term	
350	Steny H. Hoyer	D	MD-05	May 19, 1981	2nd term	
351	Mike Oxley	R	OH-04	June 25, 1981	2nd term	
352	Wayne Dowdy	D	MS-04	July 7, 1981	2nd term	
353	Barbara B. Kennelly	D	CT-01	January 12, 1982	2nd term	
354	Matthew G. Martínez	D	CA-30	July 13, 1982	2nd term	
355	Katie Hall	D	IN-01	November 2, 1982	2nd term	Left the House in 1985.
356	Michael A. Andrews	D	TX-25	January 3, 1983	1st term	
357	Steve Bartlett	R	TX-03	January 3, 1983	1st term	
358	Jim Bates	D	CA-44	January 3, 1983	1st term	
359	Herbert Bateman	R	VA-01	January 3, 1983	1st term	
360	Howard Berman	D	CA-26	January 3, 1983	1st term	
361	Michael Bilirakis	R	FL-09	January 3, 1983	1st term	
362	Sherwood Boehlert	R	NY-25	January 3, 1983	1st term	
363	Robert A. Borski, Jr.	D	PA-03	January 3, 1983	1st term	
364	Douglas H. Bosco	D	CA-01	January 3, 1983	1st term	
365	Rick Boucher	D	VA-09	January 3, 1983	1st term	
366	Barbara Boxer	D	CA-06	January 3, 1983	1st term	
367	Charles R. Britt	D	NC-06	January 3, 1983	1st term	Left the House in 1985.
368	John Bryant	D	TX-05	January 3, 1983	1st term	
369	Dan Burton	R	IN-06	January 3, 1983	1st term	
370	Thomas Carper	D	DE	January 3, 1983	1st term	
371	Bob Carr	D	MI-06	January 3, 1983; Previous service, 1975–1981.	4th term*	
372	Rod Chandler	R	WA-08	January 3, 1983	1st term	
373	James M. Clarke	D	NC-11	January 3, 1983	1st term	Left the House in 1985.
374	Ron Coleman	D	TX-16	January 3, 1983	1st term	
375	Jim Cooper	D	TN-04	January 3, 1983	1st term	
376	Mike DeWine	R	OH-07	January 3, 1983	1st term	
377	Richard Durbin	D	IL-20	January 3, 1983	1st term	
378	Ben Erdreich	D	AL-06	January 3, 1983	1st term	
379	Lane Evans	D	IL-17	January 3, 1983	1st term	
380	Ed Feighan	D	OH-19	January 3, 1983	1st term	
381	Webb Franklin	R	MS-02	January 3, 1983	1st term	
382	George Gekas	R	PA-17	January 3, 1983	1st term	
383	Frank G. Harrison	D	PA-11	January 3, 1983	1st term	Left the House in 1985.
384	Nancy Johnson	R	CT-06	January 3, 1983	1st term	
385	Marcy Kaptur	D	OH-09	January 3, 1983	1st term	
386	John Kasich	R	OH-12	January 3, 1983	1st term	
387	Joseph P. Kolter	D	PA-04	January 3, 1983	1st term	
388	Peter H. Kostmayer	D	PA-08	January 3, 1983; Previous service, 1977–1981.	3rd term*	
389	Richard H. Lehman	D	CA-18	January 3, 1983	1st term	
390	Mel Levine	D	CA-27	January 3, 1983	1st term	
391	Sander Levin	D	MI-17	January 3, 1983	1st term	
392	Tom Lewis	R	FL-12	January 3, 1983	1st term	
393	Bill Lipinski	D	IL-05	January 3, 1983	1st term	
394	Buddy MacKay	D	FL-06	January 3, 1983	1st term	
395	Connie Mack III	R	FL-13	January 3, 1983	1st term	
396	John McCain	R	AZ-01	January 3, 1983	1st term	
397	Al McCandless	R	CA-37	January 3, 1983	1st term	
398	Frank McCloskey	D	IN-08	January 3, 1983	1st term	Left the House in 1985.
399	John R. McKernan, Jr.	R	ME-01	January 3, 1983	1st term	
400	James F. McNulty, Jr.	D	AZ-05	January 3, 1983	1st term	Left the House in 1985.
401	Alan Mollohan	D	WV-01	January 3, 1983	1st term	
402	Jim Moody	D	WI-05	January 3, 1983	1st term	
403	Bruce Morrison	D	CT-03	January 3, 1983	1st term	
404	Robert J. Mrazek	D	NY-03	January 3, 1983	1st term	
405	Howard C. Nielson	R	UT-03	January 3, 1983	1st term	
406	Jim Olin	D	VA-06	January 3, 1983	1st term	
407	Solomon Ortiz	D	TX-27	January 3, 1983	1st term	
408	Major Owens	D	NY-12	January 3, 1983	1st term	
409	Ron Packard	R	CA-43	January 3, 1983	1st term	
410	Tim Penny	D	MN-01	January 3, 1983	1st term	
411	Richard Ray	D	GA-03	January 3, 1983	1st term	
412	Harry Reid	D	NV-01	January 3, 1983	1st term	
413	Bill Richardson	D	NM-03	January 3, 1983	1st term	
414	Tom Ridge	R	PA-21	January 3, 1983	1st term	
415	James Rowland	D	GA-08	January 3, 1983	1st term	
416	Gerry Sikorski	D	MN-06	January 3, 1983	1st term	
417	Norman Sisisky	D	VA-04	January 3, 1983	1st term	
418	Jim Slattery	D	KS-02	January 3, 1983	1st term	
419	Lawrence J. Smith	D	FL-16	January 3, 1983	1st term	
420	Robert Smith	R	OR-02	January 3, 1983	1st term	
421	John Spratt	D	SC-05	January 3, 1983	1st term	
422	Harley O. Staggers, Jr.	D	WV-02	January 3, 1983	1st term	
423	Don Sundquist	R	TN-07	January 3, 1983	1st term	
424	Robin Tallon	D	SC-06	January 3, 1983	1st term	
425	Lindsay Thomas	D	GA-01	January 3, 1983	1st term	
426	Ed Towns	D	NY-11	January 3, 1983	1st term	
427	Robert Torricelli	D	NJ-09	January 3, 1983	1st term	
428	Esteban Edward Torres	D	CA-34	January 3, 1983	1st term	
429	Tim Valentine	D	NC-02	January 3, 1983	1st term	
430	Tom Vandergriff	D	TX-26	January 3, 1983	1st term	Left the House in 1985.
431	Barbara Vucanovich	R	NV-02	January 3, 1983	1st term	
432	Alan Wheat	D	MO-05	January 3, 1983	1st term	
433	Bob Wise	D	WV-03	January 3, 1983	1st term	
434	Ed Zschau	R	CA-12	January 3, 1983	1st term	
	Gary Ackerman	D	NY-07	March 1, 1983	1st term	
435	Daniel Schaefer	R	CO-06	March 29, 1983	1st term	
	Sala Burton	D	CA-05	June 21, 1983	1st term	
	Charles Hayes	D	IL-01	August 23, 1983	1st term	
	George Darden	D	GA-07	November 8, 1983	1st term	
	Jerry Kleczka	D	WI-04	April 3, 1984	1st term	
	Carl C. Perkins	D	KY-07	November 6, 1984	1st term	
	Jim Saxton	R	NJ-13	November 6, 1984	1st term	

== Delegates ==
Rank	Delegate	Party	District	Seniority date (Previous service, if any)	No.# of term(s)	Notes
1	Walter E. Fauntroy	D	DC	March 23, 1971	7th term	
2	Antonio Borja Won Pat	D	GU	January 3, 1973	6th term	
3	Baltasar Corrada del Río	D	PR	January 3, 1977	4th term	
4	Ron de Lugo	D	VI	January 3, 1981; Previous service, 1973–1979.	5th term*	
5	Fofó Iosefa Fiti Sunia	D	AS	January 3, 1981	2nd term	

== See also ==
- 98th United States Congress
- List of United States congressional districts
- List of United States senators in the 98th Congress
