= Nathan H. Miller =

American politician (born 1943)

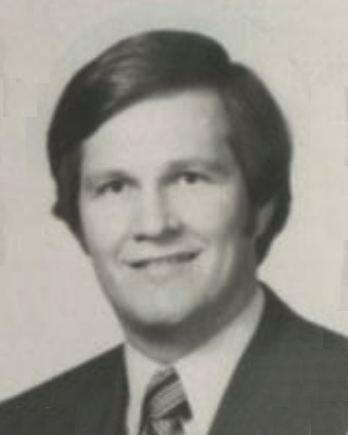

Member of the Virginia Senate from the 26th district
- In office January 14, 1976 – January 11, 1984
- Preceded by: George S. Aldhizer
- Succeeded by: Kevin G. Miller

Member of the Virginia House of Delegates from the 16th district
- In office January 12, 1972 – January 14, 1976 Serving with Clinton Miller
- Preceded by: Don C. Earman
- Succeeded by: Bonnie L. Paul

Personal details
- Born: Nathan Huff Miller; July 4, 1943 (age 83) Rockingham County, Virginia, United States
- Party: Republican
- Education: Bridgewater College (BA); University of Richmond (LLB)

Nathan Huff Miller (born July 4, 1943) is an American lawyer and political figure from the Commonwealth of Virginia. A Republican, he served in both houses of the Virginia General Assembly. He is currently the managing partner of Harrisonburg law firm Miller, Earle & Shanks.

== Background ==
Miller was born in Rockingham County and graduated from Bridgewater College and T.C. Williams School of Law of the University of Richmond. He is a member of the Church of the Brethren, Bridgewater Rotary Club, Harrisonburg Jaycees and Rockingham Male Chorus. He previously served as a judge of the Timberville Municipal Court.

== Political career ==
Nathan Miller and fellow Republican attorney Clinton Miller were first elected to the Virginia House of Delegates in 1971. They succeeded Republicans Don E. Earman and Donald K. Funkhouser. Nathan Miller served two terms as delegate (1972-1975).

In 1975 he won election to the Virginia State Senate, defeating incumbent Democrat George S. Aldhizer to represent the 26th District, which included Culpeper, Madison, Page, Rappahannock and Rockingham Counties, as well as the City of Harrisonburg, where he served (in the also part-time position) from 1976 until 1984. He defeated Democrat W.E. Schlabach in 1975, whom his successor, fellow Republican and former delegate Kevin G. Miller (a retired accounting professor) defeated in 1979.

Miller ran for the Virginia Republican nomination for the U.S. Senate in 1978, but lost to John W. Warner, who won the general election. Nathan Miller became the Republican nominee for Lieutenant Governor of Virginia in 1981, but lost the general election to Richard Joseph Davis, Democratic State Chairman and mayor of Portsmouth, Virginia.
