= 1928 United States Senate election in Virginia =

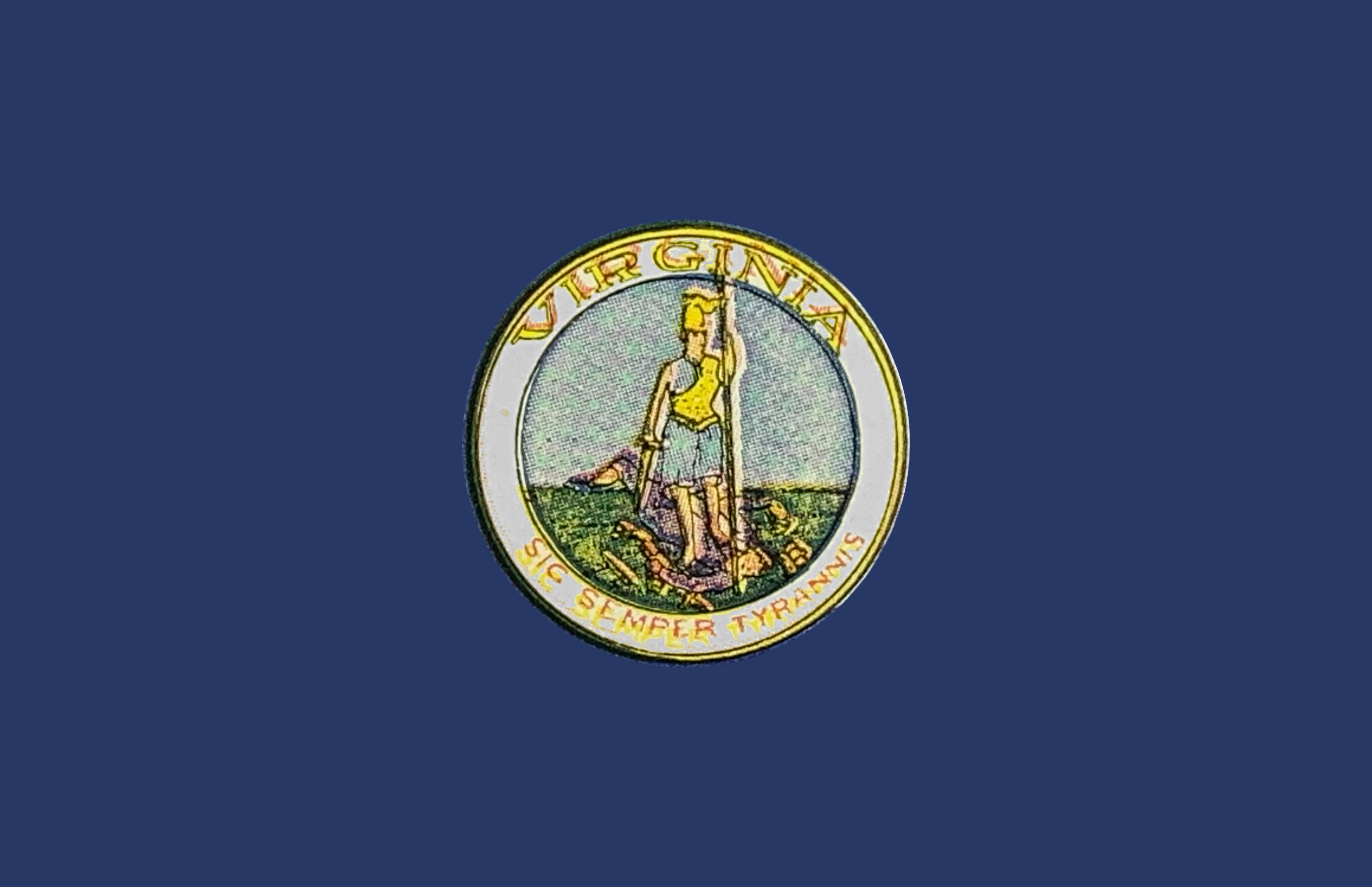
- November 6, 1928
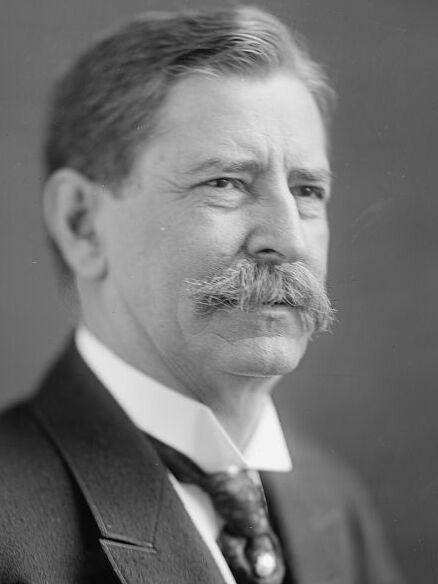
Nominee	Claude A. Swanson
Party	Democratic
Popular vote	275,425
Percentage	99.84%
U.S. senator before election
Claude A. Swanson
Democratic
Elected U.S. Senator
Claude A. Swanson
Democratic

The 1928 United States Senate election in Virginia was held on November 6, 1928. Incumbent Senator Claude A. Swanson was re-elected to a fourth term. This is the most recent U.S. Senate election in Virginia history when a candidate ran completely unopposed.

== Results ==
United States Senate election in Virginia, 1928
Party	Candidate	Votes	%	±%
Democratic	Claude A. Swanson (inc.)	275,425	99.84%	+27.96%
Write-ins		436	0.16%	+0.16%
Majority		274,989	99.68%	+54.29%
Turnout		275,861		
Democratic hold				

== See also ==
- 1928 United States Senate elections
