= Paul Trible =

American politician (born 1946)

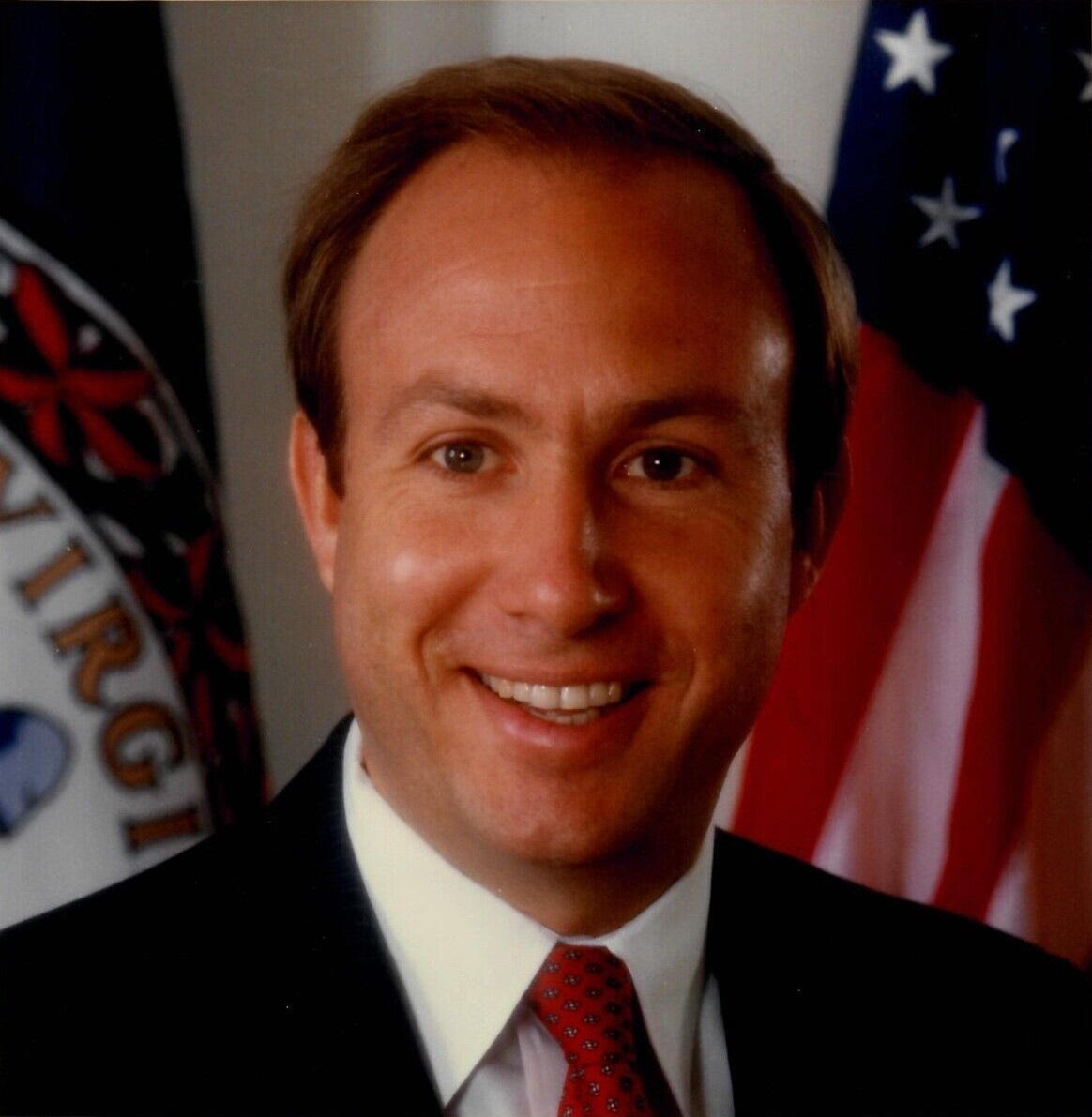

President of Christopher Newport University
- In office January 1, 1996 – August 1, 2022
- Preceded by: Anthony Santoro
- Succeeded by: William G. (Bill) Kelly

United States Senator from Virginia
- In office January 3, 1983 – January 3, 1989
- Preceded by: Harry F. Byrd Jr.
- Succeeded by: Chuck Robb

Member of the U.S. House of Representatives from Virginia's 1st district
- In office January 3, 1977 – January 3, 1983
- Preceded by: Thomas N. Downing
- Succeeded by: Herbert H. Bateman

Personal details
- Born: Paul Seward Trible Jr. December 29, 1946 (age 79) Baltimore, Maryland, U.S.
- Party: Republican
- Spouse: Rosemary Trible
- Children: 2
- Education: Hampden-Sydney College (BA); Washington and Lee University (JD)

Paul Seward Trible Jr. (born December 29, 1946) is an American attorney, politician and academic administrator. Trible was the president of Christopher Newport University from 1996 until his retirement in 2022. A Republican, he represented Virginia in the U.S. House of Representatives for three terms and the U.S. Senate for one. Trible was the first Republican Class I senator from Virginia.

== Education and early career ==
Trible attended Hampden–Sydney College, where he was a member of the Lambda Chi Alpha fraternity and graduated in 1968 with a Bachelor of Arts in history. According to Lewis Puller, Jr., a Marine Corps veteran of Vietnam who lost both legs in combat and earned the Silver Star, Trible received a medical deferment from the draft for a dubious claim of a lack of full range of motion in an arm. In 1971, he received a Juris Doctor degree from Washington and Lee University School of Law and was soon after admitted to the Virginia Bar. He served as a law clerk for a federal judge from 1971 to 1972, and then as an assistant U.S. Attorney in the Eastern District of Virginia from 1972 to 1974. Trible was later inducted as an alumnus initiate into Omicron Delta Kappa at Hampden-Sydney College in 1977.

== Political career ==
In 1973, at age 26, Trible was elected as Commonwealth's Attorney for Essex County, Virginia, serving from 1974 to 1976. He was appointed to the Virginia Law Enforcement Officers Training and Standards Commission in 1976 and at age 29 in November was elected to the U.S. House of Representatives, winning reelection in 1978 and 1980.

In 1982, the 35-year-old Trible received the Republican nomination for the U.S. Senate seat being vacated by Harry F. Byrd Jr., defeating Lieutenant Governor Dick Davis in the general election. After serving in the U.S. Senate from 1983 to 1989, Trible declined to seek reelection in 1988. During the last year of his Senate term, he served simultaneously as a member of the U.S. Delegation to the United Nations. In 1989, Trible was the early favorite to capture the GOP nomination for governor; however, Marshall Coleman narrowly won the nomination and ultimately lost to Democrat Douglas Wilder.

In 1989, between his retirement from the Senate, and his run for governor, Trible was a teaching fellow at the John F. Kennedy School of Government at Harvard University. After his political career, Trible briefly returned to practicing law with Laxalt, Washington, Perito and Dubuc of Washington, D.C., and Shuttleworth, Ruloff, Giordano and Kahle, P.C. of Virginia Beach, Virginia.

=== Elections ===
- 1976: Elected to the U.S. House of Representatives with 48.56% of the vote, defeating Robert E. Quinn (D) and Mary B. McClaine (I).
- 1978: Re-elected with 72.06% of the vote defeating Lewis B. Puller Jr. (D).
- 1980: Re-elected with 90.48% of the vote defeating Sharon D. Grant (I).
- 1982: Elected to the U.S. Senate with 51.18% of the vote, defeating Richard J. Davis Jr. (D).

== Christopher Newport University ==
On January 1, 1996, Trible became the fifth president of Christopher Newport University (CNU). The 35-year-old institution had recently achieved full university status and his arrival came at a time when the school was undergoing many changes as it evolved from a college to a university.

In late 2006, CNU’s Board of Visitors announced that a new library and a merit scholarship with a $500,000 endowment would be named in honor of President Trible and his wife in recognition of their leadership and contributions to the university. Trible also serves on the Council of Presidents of Virginia’s public colleges and universities, as well as Chair of the NCAA Division III President's Council.

On September 24, 2021, Trible announced his intention to complete his time as president of CNU at the end of the 2021–2022 academic year. Shortly after, it was announced that he would temporarily be succeeded by Adelia Thompson, current chief of staff at CNU, as Interim President for the 2022–2023 school year, and his successor would take office in the summer of 2023. After serving as president, Trible became chancellor of CNU.

== Personal life ==
He is married to Rosemary (Dunaway) Trible. They have two children, Mary Katherine, who is married to Dr. Barrett W. R. Peters; and Paul, CEO and co-founder of Ledbury, who is married to Brittany (Gordon) Trible. His father was Paul Seward Trible, a businessman and farmer, who was the seventh of eight children born to George Meredith and Clara (Seward) Trible. His mother was Katherine (Schilpp) Trible.

== Publications ==
- Trible, Paul S. "Restoring the College Core" Richmond Times-Dispatch 2 November 2014: F3.
- Trible, Paul. "Colleges Must Get Used to Collaborating With Congress" The Chronicle of Higher Education 15 July 2005: B16.
- Trible, Paul. "Letting Colleges Down" The Washington Post 19 April 2005: A12.

U.S. House of Representatives
Preceded by Thomas N. Downing	Member of the U.S. House of Representatives from Virginia's 1st congressional district 1977–1983	Succeeded by Herbert H. Bateman
Party political offices
Vacant Title last held by Ray L. Garland; 1970	Republican nominee for U.S. Senator from Virginia (Class 1); 1982	Succeeded by Maurice Dawkins
U.S. Senate
Preceded by Harry F. Byrd Jr.	U.S. Senator (Class 1) from Virginia; 1983–1989; Served alongside: John Warner	Succeeded by Chuck Robb
U.S. order of precedence (ceremonial)
Preceded by John E. Sununu as Former U.S. Senator	Order of precedence of the United States	Succeeded by George Allen as Former U.S. Senator
