= 1988 United States presidential election in Virginia =

- November 8, 1988
- Turnout: 77.6% ▼

Nominee	George H. W. Bush	Michael Dukakis
Party	Republican	Democratic
Home state	Texas	Massachusetts
Running mate	Dan Quayle	Lloyd Bentsen
Electoral vote	12	0
Popular vote	1,309,162	859,799
Percentage	59.74%	39.23%

Bush
40–50%
50–60%
60–70%
70–80%
80–90%
90–100%
Dukakis
40–50%
50–60%
60–70%
70–80%
80–90%
90–100%
Other
Tie
No vote
President before election
Ronald Reagan
Republican
Elected President
George H. W. Bush
Republican

The 1988 United States presidential election in Virginia took place on November 8, 1988. All 50 states and the District of Columbia, were part of the 1988 United States presidential election. Virginia voters chose 12 electors to the Electoral College, which selected the president and vice president.

Virginia was won by incumbent United States Vice President George H. W. Bush of Texas, who was running against Massachusetts Governor Michael Dukakis. Bush ran with Indiana Senator Dan Quayle as Vice President, and Dukakis ran with Texas Senator Lloyd Bentsen.

Most counties in Virginia turned out for Bush, including the highly populated regions of Virginia Beach and Fairfax County. Bush ran strongly in most parts of the state, but in particular, he cracked sixty percent in populous Fairfax County, outside Washington, D.C., and got over 2/3 and 3/4 of the vote in the Richmond suburbs of Henrico and Chesterfield, respectively, which contributed to the swelling of his statewide margin. Dukakis did well in Arlington County, the independent cities of Richmond and Norfolk, in Virginia's Black Belt counties, and in some then-traditionally Democratic counties in heavily-unionized southwest Virginia. At the time, Virginia was considered to be a Republican stronghold.

As of the 2024 presidential election, this is the last election in which Northampton County and the independent cities of Martinsville, Fredericksburg, and Hampton voted for a Republican presidential candidate. This was also the last time that a Republican won the majority of the vote in Fairfax County.

== Background ==
Every Republican presidential nominee following World War II had won Virginia except for the victories of Harry S. Truman and Lyndon B. Johnson in the 1948 and 1964 elections. Virginia was the only southern state that Democratic nominee Jimmy Carter failed to win in the 1976 election.

The Republicans held Virginia's governorship from the 1969 election until Democratic nominee Chuck Robb's victory in 1981. The Democrats had also reduced the Republican control over the state's United States House of Representatives delegation from nine of ten seats in 1980 to five seats in 1986.

== Primaries ==
Jesse Jackson won the Democratic primary due to lower white turnout and increased black turnout. Jackson won 96% of the black vote and 12% of the white vote. Al Gore won 40% of the white vote while Michael Dukakis won 35%. The racial composition of the primary was 65% white and 35% black, and 49% of white voters participated in the Republican primary.

1988 Republican presidential primary
Candidate	Votes
George H.W Bush	124,738
Bob Dole	60,921
Pat Robertson	32,173
Jack Kemp	10,809
Pete Du Pont	1,229
Alexander M. Haig, Jr.	597
Uncommitted	3,675
Total	234,142

1988 Democratic presidential primary
Candidate	Votes
Jesse Jackson	164,709
Al Gore	81,419
Michael Dukakis	80,183
Paul Simon	15,935
Gary Hart	7,045
Bruce Babbitt	2,454
Lyndon Larouche	746
Uncommitted	12,398
Total	364,899

== Campaign ==
Among white voters, 69% supported Bush while 30% supported Dukakis. Bush placed first in all of the state's congressional districts. Robb won in the concurrent senatorial election despite the Republican presidential victory.

== Results ==
1988 United States presidential election in Virginia
Party	Candidate	Votes	Percentage	Electoral votes
Republican	George H. W. Bush	1,309,162	59.74%	12
Democratic	Michael Dukakis	859,799	39.23%	0
Independent	Lenora Fulani	14,312	0.65%	0
Libertarian	Ron Paul	8,336	0.38%	0
Totals		2,191,609	100.0%	12

=== By city/county ===
County or city	George H. W. Bush Republican		Michael Dukakis Democratic		Lenora Fulani Independent		Ron Paul Libertarian		Margin		Total votes cast
County or city	#	%	#	%	#	%	#	%	#	%	Total votes cast
Accomack	6,926	60.01%	4,443	38.49%	125	1.08%	48	0.42%	2,483	21.52%	11,542
Albemarle	15,117	58.70%	10,363	40.24%	89	0.35%	184	0.71%	4,754	18.46%	25,753
Alexandria	20,913	45.66%	24,358	53.18%	347	0.76%	186	0.41%	-3,445	-7.52%	45,804
Alleghany	2,555	51.87%	2,316	47.02%	42	0.85%	13	0.26%	239	4.85%	4,926
Amelia	2,187	60.85%	1,359	37.81%	26	0.72%	22	0.61%	828	23.04%	3,594
Amherst	6,507	64.10%	3,567	35.14%	45	0.44%	32	0.32%	2,940	28.96%	10,151
Appomattox	3,205	63.59%	1,740	34.52%	53	1.05%	42	0.83%	1,465	29.07%	5,040
Arlington	34,191	45.37%	40,314	53.49%	442	0.59%	418	0.55%	-6,123	-8.12%	75,365
Augusta	13,251	75.14%	4,170	23.65%	145	0.82%	68	0.39%	9,081	51.49%	17,634
Bath	1,273	58.74%	881	40.66%	8	0.37%	5	0.23%	392	18.08%	2,167
Bedford	10,702	65.33%	5,406	33.00%	205	1.25%	69	0.42%	5,296	32.33%	16,382
Bedford City	1,322	56.79%	960	41.24%	36	1.55%	10	0.43%	362	15.55%	2,328
Bland	1,556	61.12%	937	36.80%	38	1.49%	15	0.59%	619	24.32%	2,546
Botetourt	5,687	59.30%	3,763	39.23%	92	0.96%	49	0.51%	1,924	20.07%	9,591
Bristol	4,407	63.92%	2,446	35.47%	28	0.41%	14	0.20%	1,961	28.44%	6,895
Brunswick	2,742	46.60%	3,070	52.18%	44	0.75%	28	0.48%	-328	-5.58%	5,884
Buchanan	3,912	35.68%	6,935	63.25%	100	0.91%	18	0.16%	-3,023	-27.57%	10,965
Buckingham	2,481	55.49%	1,941	43.41%	32	0.72%	17	0.38%	540	12.08%	4,471
Buena Vista	1,121	56.08%	828	41.42%	37	1.85%	13	0.65%	293	14.66%	1,999
Campbell	12,713	72.51%	4,574	26.09%	193	1.10%	53	0.30%	8,139	46.42%	17,533
Caroline	3,065	48.71%	3,186	50.64%	21	0.33%	20	0.32%	-121	-1.93%	6,292
Carroll	6,377	66.17%	3,190	33.10%	41	0.43%	29	0.30%	3,187	33.07%	9,637
Charles City	826	30.59%	1,839	68.11%	18	0.67%	17	0.63%	-1,013	-37.52%	2,700
Charlotte	2,699	57.44%	1,923	40.92%	56	1.19%	21	0.45%	776	16.52%	4,699
Charlottesville	5,817	42.61%	7,671	56.19%	62	0.45%	102	0.75%	-1,854	-13.58%	13,652
Chesapeake	29,738	60.87%	18,828	38.54%	173	0.35%	116	0.24%	10,910	22.33%	48,855
Chesterfield	58,828	75.34%	18,723	23.98%	262	0.34%	270	0.35%	40,105	51.36%	78,083
Clarke	2,502	62.24%	1,478	36.77%	12	0.30%	28	0.70%	1,024	25.47%	4,020
Clifton Forge	759	43.65%	961	55.26%	10	0.58%	9	0.52%	-202	-11.61%	1,739
Colonial Heights	6,001	78.57%	1,581	20.70%	25	0.33%	31	0.41%	4,420	57.87%	7,638
Covington	1,274	43.70%	1,567	53.76%	41	1.41%	33	1.13%	-293	-10.06%	2,915
Craig	1,112	55.46%	864	43.09%	16	0.80%	13	0.65%	248	12.37%	2,005
Culpeper	5,896	68.57%	2,555	29.71%	103	1.20%	45	0.52%	3,341	38.86%	8,599
Cumberland	1,978	62.61%	1,132	35.83%	34	1.08%	15	0.47%	846	26.78%	3,159
Danville	12,221	61.49%	7,353	37.00%	224	1.13%	76	0.38%	4,868	24.49%	19,874
Dickenson	3,091	40.65%	4,461	58.67%	36	0.47%	16	0.21%	-1,370	-18.02%	7,604
Dinwiddie	4,165	54.38%	3,405	44.46%	51	0.67%	38	0.50%	760	9.92%	7,659
Emporia	1,289	56.61%	977	42.91%	7	0.31%	4	0.18%	312	13.70%	2,277
Essex	2,038	60.56%	1,294	38.45%	17	0.51%	16	0.48%	744	22.11%	3,365
Fairfax	200,641	61.10%	125,711	38.28%	892	0.27%	1,121	0.34%	74,930	22.82%	328,365
Fairfax City	5,576	61.27%	3,430	37.69%	49	0.54%	46	0.51%	2,146	23.58%	9,101
Falls Church	2,470	49.51%	2,484	49.79%	17	0.34%	18	0.36%	-14	-0.28%	4,989
Fauquier	11,733	69.86%	4,837	28.80%	161	0.96%	65	0.39%	6,896	41.06%	16,796
Floyd	2,921	61.69%	1,727	36.47%	56	1.18%	31	0.65%	1,194	25.22%	4,735
Fluvanna	2,447	60.29%	1,562	38.48%	26	0.64%	24	0.59%	885	21.81%	4,059
Franklin	7,391	55.73%	5,734	43.24%	90	0.68%	46	0.35%	1,657	12.49%	13,261
Franklin City	1,557	48.50%	1,630	50.78%	12	0.37%	11	0.34%	-73	-2.28%	3,210
Frederick	9,921	72.33%	3,707	27.02%	42	0.31%	47	0.34%	6,214	45.31%	13,717
Fredericksburg	3,401	55.26%	2,683	43.60%	40	0.65%	30	0.49%	718	11.66%	6,154
Galax	1,278	58.09%	907	41.23%	8	0.36%	7	0.32%	371	16.86%	2,200
Giles	3,490	52.50%	3,042	45.76%	80	1.20%	36	0.54%	448	6.74%	6,648
Gloucester	7,646	68.38%	3,372	30.16%	116	1.04%	47	0.42%	4,274	38.22%	11,181
Goochland	3,765	62.61%	2,209	36.74%	20	0.33%	19	0.32%	1,556	25.87%	6,013
Grayson	3,968	61.51%	2,441	37.84%	35	0.54%	7	0.11%	1,527	23.67%	6,451
Greene	2,234	69.29%	899	27.88%	72	2.23%	19	0.59%	1,335	41.41%	3,224
Greensville	1,610	43.13%	2,083	55.80%	24	0.64%	16	0.43%	-473	-12.67%	3,733
Halifax	5,671	56.02%	4,282	42.30%	97	0.96%	74	0.73%	1,389	13.72%	10,124
Hampton	24,034	54.85%	19,106	43.60%	527	1.20%	151	0.34%	4,928	11.25%	43,818
Hanover	20,570	76.99%	5,985	22.40%	75	0.28%	88	0.33%	14,585	54.59%	26,718
Harrisonburg	5,376	64.86%	2,799	33.77%	84	1.01%	29	0.35%	2,577	31.09%	8,288
Henrico	62,284	69.29%	26,980	30.02%	378	0.42%	245	0.27%	35,304	39.27%	89,887
Henry	10,871	58.04%	7,536	40.24%	258	1.38%	64	0.34%	3,335	17.80%	18,729
Highland	807	62.75%	456	35.46%	13	1.01%	10	0.78%	351	27.29%	1,286
Hopewell	4,672	63.48%	2,566	34.86%	93	1.26%	29	0.39%	2,106	28.62%	7,360
Isle of Wight	5,779	60.07%	3,747	38.95%	63	0.65%	32	0.33%	2,032	21.12%	9,621
James City	8,945	64.95%	4,642	33.70%	124	0.90%	62	0.45%	4,303	31.25%	13,773
King and Queen	1,376	50.46%	1,309	48.00%	26	0.95%	16	0.59%	67	2.46%	2,727
King George	2,587	62.40%	1,519	36.64%	21	0.51%	19	0.46%	1,068	25.76%	4,146
King William	2,735	62.89%	1,561	35.89%	31	0.71%	22	0.51%	1,174	27.00%	4,349
Lancaster	3,380	67.02%	1,551	30.76%	84	1.67%	28	0.56%	1,829	36.26%	5,043
Lee	4,080	45.11%	4,906	54.24%	30	0.33%	29	0.32%	-826	-9.13%	9,045
Lexington	994	49.11%	997	49.26%	21	1.04%	12	0.59%	-3	-0.15%	2,024
Loudoun	20,448	66.26%	10,101	32.73%	206	0.67%	107	0.35%	10,347	33.53%	30,862
Louisa	3,831	57.16%	2,789	41.61%	42	0.63%	40	0.60%	1,042	15.55%	6,702
Lunenburg	2,530	56.27%	1,870	41.59%	76	1.69%	20	0.44%	660	14.68%	4,496
Lynchburg	15,323	64.04%	8,279	34.60%	243	1.02%	81	0.34%	7,044	29.44%	23,926
Madison	2,501	62.12%	1,427	35.44%	59	1.47%	39	0.97%	1,074	26.68%	4,026
Manassas	5,980	68.59%	2,658	30.49%	55	0.63%	26	0.30%	3,322	38.10%	8,719
Manassas Park	993	68.67%	434	30.01%	9	0.62%	10	0.69%	559	38.66%	1,446
Martinsville	3,360	53.64%	2,794	44.60%	86	1.37%	24	0.38%	566	9.04%	6,264
Mathews	2,752	67.52%	1,235	30.30%	57	1.40%	32	0.79%	1,517	37.22%	4,076
Mecklenburg	5,887	63.45%	3,275	35.30%	71	0.77%	45	0.49%	2,612	28.15%	9,278
Middlesex	2,571	63.99%	1,361	33.87%	42	1.05%	44	1.10%	1,210	30.12%	4,018
Montgomery	12,326	57.48%	8,909	41.55%	98	0.46%	111	0.52%	3,417	15.93%	21,444
Nelson	2,502	51.60%	2,272	46.86%	35	0.72%	40	0.82%	230	4.74%	4,849
New Kent	2,917	66.54%	1,427	32.55%	20	0.46%	20	0.46%	1,490	33.99%	4,384
Newport News	32,570	59.88%	21,413	39.37%	287	0.53%	125	0.23%	11,157	20.51%	54,395
Norfolk	30,538	44.33%	37,778	54.84%	347	0.50%	228	0.33%	-7,240	-10.51%	68,891
Northampton	2,562	52.00%	2,242	45.50%	94	1.91%	29	0.59%	320	6.50%	4,927
Northumberland	2,984	65.14%	1,506	32.87%	61	1.33%	30	0.65%	1,478	32.27%	4,581
Norton	608	42.73%	795	55.87%	15	1.05%	5	0.35%	-187	-13.14%	1,423
Nottoway	3,161	57.38%	2,217	40.24%	103	1.87%	28	0.51%	944	17.14%	5,509
Orange	4,319	61.57%	2,592	36.95%	69	0.98%	35	0.50%	1,727	24.62%	7,015
Page	5,013	66.18%	2,499	32.99%	35	0.46%	28	0.37%	2,514	33.19%	7,575
Patrick	3,990	64.06%	2,093	33.60%	124	1.99%	22	0.35%	1,897	30.46%	6,229
Petersburg	4,231	33.60%	8,177	64.94%	131	1.04%	52	0.41%	-3,946	-31.34%	12,591
Pittsylvania	12,229	63.69%	6,612	34.44%	283	1.47%	77	0.40%	5,617	29.25%	19,201
Poquoson	3,840	80.83%	877	18.46%	18	0.38%	16	0.34%	2,963	62.37%	4,751
Portsmouth	16,087	44.61%	19,698	54.63%	166	0.46%	108	0.30%	-3,611	-10.02%	36,059
Powhatan	4,040	72.91%	1,467	26.48%	16	0.29%	18	0.32%	2,573	46.43%	5,541
Prince Edward	3,147	55.02%	2,434	42.55%	95	1.66%	44	0.77%	713	12.47%	5,720
Prince George	4,982	66.29%	2,469	32.85%	38	0.51%	26	0.35%	2,513	33.44%	7,515
Prince William	39,654	66.70%	19,198	32.29%	434	0.73%	167	0.28%	20,456	34.41%	59,453
Pulaski	6,844	58.40%	4,686	39.99%	140	1.19%	49	0.42%	2,158	18.41%	11,719
Radford	2,481	56.84%	1,855	42.50%	21	0.48%	8	0.18%	626	14.34%	4,365
Rappahannock	1,657	61.69%	1,003	37.34%	8	0.30%	18	0.67%	654	24.35%	2,686
Richmond	1,862	66.24%	924	32.87%	15	0.53%	10	0.36%	938	33.37%	2,811
Richmond City	31,586	42.26%	42,155	56.41%	639	0.86%	356	0.48%	-10,569	-14.15%	74,736
Roanoke	22,011	62.61%	12,938	36.80%	115	0.33%	93	0.26%	9,073	25.81%	35,157
Roanoke City	15,389	46.90%	17,185	52.37%	132	0.40%	107	0.33%	-1,796	-5.47%	32,813
Rockbridge	3,541	58.41%	2,412	39.79%	65	1.07%	44	0.73%	1,129	18.62%	6,062
Rockingham	13,241	72.59%	4,716	25.85%	190	1.04%	94	0.52%	8,525	46.74%	18,241
Russell	4,374	40.68%	6,222	57.86%	130	1.21%	27	0.25%	-1,848	-17.18%	10,753
Salem	5,694	59.77%	3,760	39.47%	40	0.42%	33	0.35%	1,934	20.30%	9,527
Scott	4,986	56.76%	3,616	41.16%	139	1.58%	44	0.50%	1,370	15.60%	8,785
Shenandoah	8,612	71.74%	3,276	27.29%	67	0.56%	49	0.41%	5,336	44.45%	12,004
Smyth	7,446	63.49%	3,989	34.02%	236	2.01%	56	0.48%	3,457	29.47%	11,727
South Boston	1,694	64.05%	936	35.39%	11	0.42%	4	0.15%	758	28.66%	2,645
Southampton	3,439	52.96%	3,000	46.20%	35	0.54%	19	0.29%	439	6.76%	6,493
Spotsylvania	10,978	66.16%	5,486	33.06%	84	0.51%	45	0.27%	5,492	33.10%	16,593
Stafford	12,234	69.07%	5,380	30.37%	55	0.31%	43	0.24%	6,854	38.70%	17,712
Staunton	5,775	69.29%	2,457	29.48%	87	1.04%	15	0.18%	3,318	39.81%	8,334
Suffolk	9,742	54.27%	8,080	45.01%	79	0.44%	49	0.27%	1,662	9.26%	17,950
Surry	1,246	42.98%	1,602	55.26%	22	0.76%	29	1.00%	-356	-12.28%	2,899
Sussex	1,822	46.77%	1,958	50.26%	79	2.03%	37	0.95%	-136	-3.49%	3,896
Tazewell	7,165	46.37%	8,098	52.40%	152	0.98%	38	0.25%	-933	-6.03%	15,453
Virginia Beach	76,481	68.89%	33,780	30.43%	397	0.36%	360	0.32%	42,701	38.46%	111,018
Warren	4,700	61.86%	2,769	36.44%	103	1.36%	26	0.34%	1,931	25.42%	7,598
Washington	10,722	63.45%	5,819	34.43%	293	1.73%	65	0.38%	4,903	29.02%	16,899
Waynesboro	4,672	68.72%	2,038	29.97%	67	0.99%	22	0.32%	2,634	38.75%	6,799
Westmoreland	2,974	55.38%	2,311	43.04%	60	1.12%	25	0.47%	663	12.34%	5,370
Williamsburg	1,648	50.91%	1,534	47.39%	26	0.80%	29	0.90%	114	3.52%	3,237
Winchester	4,497	65.53%	2,300	33.52%	25	0.36%	40	0.58%	2,197	32.01%	6,862
Wise	6,189	46.23%	7,017	52.42%	130	0.97%	50	0.37%	-828	-6.19%	13,386
Wythe	5,827	63.17%	3,201	34.70%	170	1.84%	27	0.29%	2,626	28.47%	9,225
York	11,103	69.96%	4,639	29.23%	84	0.53%	45	0.28%	6,464	40.73%	15,871
Totals	1,309,162	59.74%	859,799	39.23%	14,312	0.65%	8,336	0.38%	449,363	20.51%	2,191,609

==== Counties and independent cities that flipped from Republican to Democratic ====
- Lee
- Tazewell
- Wise
- Clifton Forge
- Covington
- Falls Church
- Franklin
- Lexington
- Roanoke

== See also ==
- Presidency of George H. W. Bush

== Works cited ==
- Black, Earl; Black, Merle (1992). The Vital South: How Presidents Are Elected. Harvard University Press. ISBN 0674941306.
- Moreland, Laurence; Steed, Robert; Baker, Tod, eds. (1991). The 1988 Presidential Election in the South: Continuity Amidst Change in Southern Party Politics. Praeger Publishers. ISBN 0275931455.
