= 1988 Virginia ballot measures =

The 1988 Virginia State Elections took place on Election Day, November 8, 1988, the same day as the U.S. Senate and U.S. House elections in the state. The only statewide election on the ballot was one referendum. Because Virginia state elections are held on off-years, no statewide officers or state legislative elections were held. The referendum was referred to the voters by the Virginia General Assembly.

== Question 1 ==
This referendum asked voters to approve legislation that would legalize and regulate parimutuel betting on horse racing. Voters had previously rejected the measure in 1978. Greyhound racing was already legal but was outlawed in 1995, although it remains legal in West Virginia.

Question 1
Choice	Votes	%
For	1,086,996	55.86
Against	858,850	44.14
Total	1,945,846	100.00
Source: - Official Results
