= 2000 Virginia ballot measures =

The 2000 Virginia State Elections took place on Election Day, November 7, 2000, the same day as the U.S. Presidential, U.S. Senate and the U.S. House elections in the state. The only statewide elections on the ballot were two constitutional referendums to amend the Virginia State Constitution. Because Virginia state elections are held on off-years, no statewide officers or state legislative elections were held. All referendums were referred to the voters by the Virginia General Assembly.

== Question 1 ==
The Lottery Proceeds Fund amendment requires the General Assembly to establish a Fund where the Commonwealth must put the net revenues from the Virginia State Lottery. Lottery proceeds in the Fund must be distributed to local governments, and their school divisions, to be spent locally for public education. Previously, the General Assembly had broad discretion to appropriate the lottery profits for any public purpose. The General Assembly will be able to appropriate money from the Fund and not distribute it to the localities only in exceptional cases. Four-fifths of the members voting in each house of the General Assembly must agree to appropriate lottery proceeds from the Fund in such an exceptional case. A locality that accepts a share of the lottery proceeds must maintain its local share of education expenses to meet the state standards of quality for school divisions, without using lottery proceeds to do so. The amendment also requires the General Assembly to pass laws necessary to establish the Fund and implement the new constitutional provision.

Question 1
Choice	Votes	%
For	2,067,186	83.49
Against	408,650	16.51
Total	2,475,836	100.00
Source: - Official Results

== Question 2 ==
The Right to Hunt, Fish and Harvest Game amendment adds a statement to the Constitution that "the people have a right to hunt, fish, and harvest game." That right is subject to regulations and restrictions that the General Assembly enacts by general law.

Question 2
Choice	Votes	%
For	1,448,154	59.88
Against	970,266	40.12
Total	2,418,420	100.00
Source: - Official Results
