= 1978 Virginia ballot measures =

The 1978 Virginia State Elections took place on Election Day, November 7, 1978, the same day as the U.S. House elections in the state. The only statewide elections on the ballot were one constitutional referendums to amend the Virginia State Constitution and one statutory referendum. Because Virginia state elections are held on off-years, no statewide officers or state legislative elections were held. All referendums were referred to the voters by the Virginia General Assembly.

== Question 1 ==
This amendment asked voters to give the Virginia General Assembly the ability to permit certain tax exemptions for property which has undergone substantial renovation, rehabilitation or replacement necessitated by age and use.

Question 1
Choice	Votes	%
For	690,479	68.05
Against	324,236	31.95
Total	1,014,715	100.00
Source: - Official Results

== Question 2 ==
This referendum asked voters to legalize and regulate parimutuel betting on horse racing in Virginia. Although this measure was rejected by voters, it was approved 10 years later in 1988.

Question 2
Choice	Votes	%
For	544,781	48.01
Against	589,843	51.99
Total	1,134,624	100.00
Source: - Official Results
