= List of United States senators from Virginia =

Current delegation

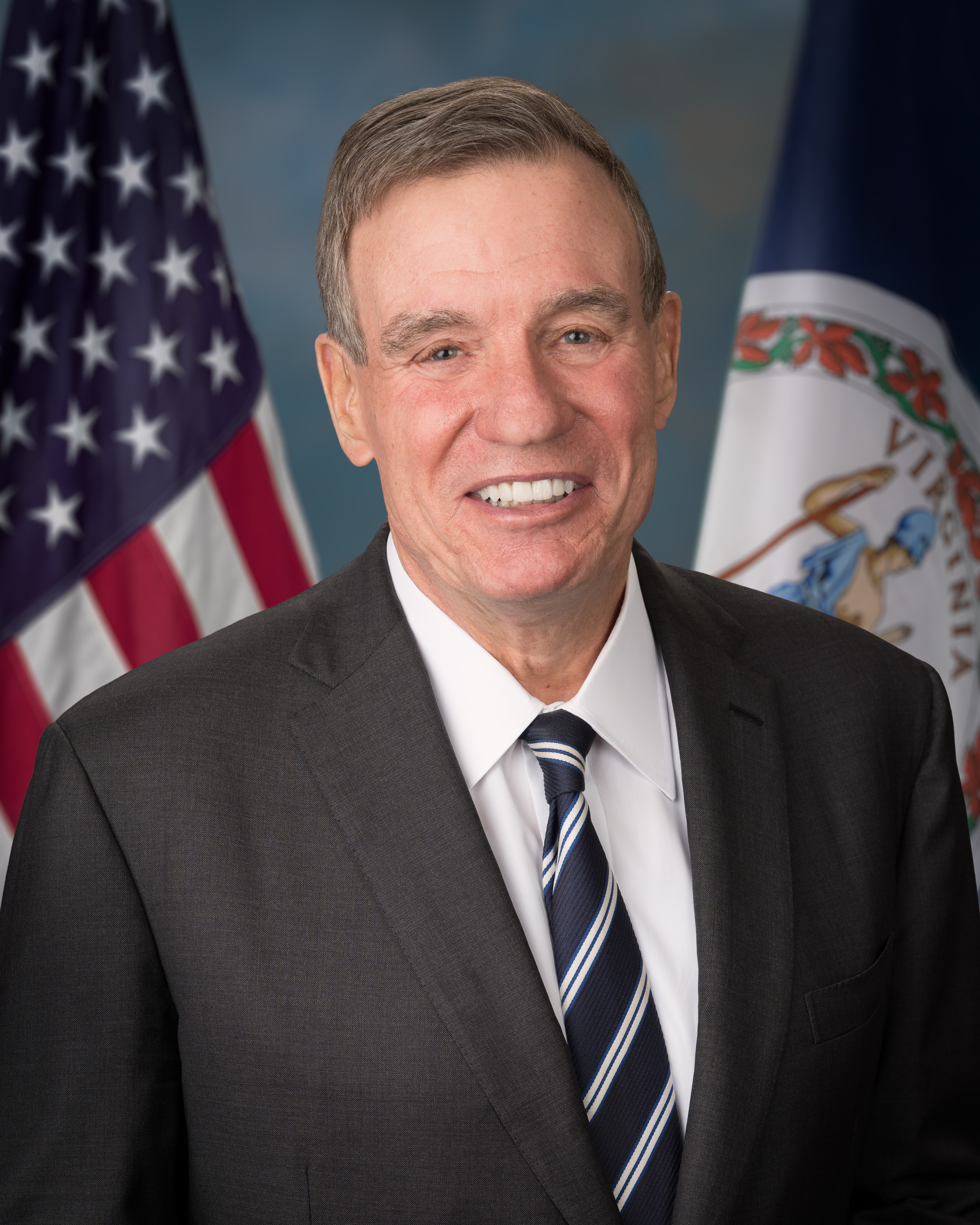
Mark Warner (D)

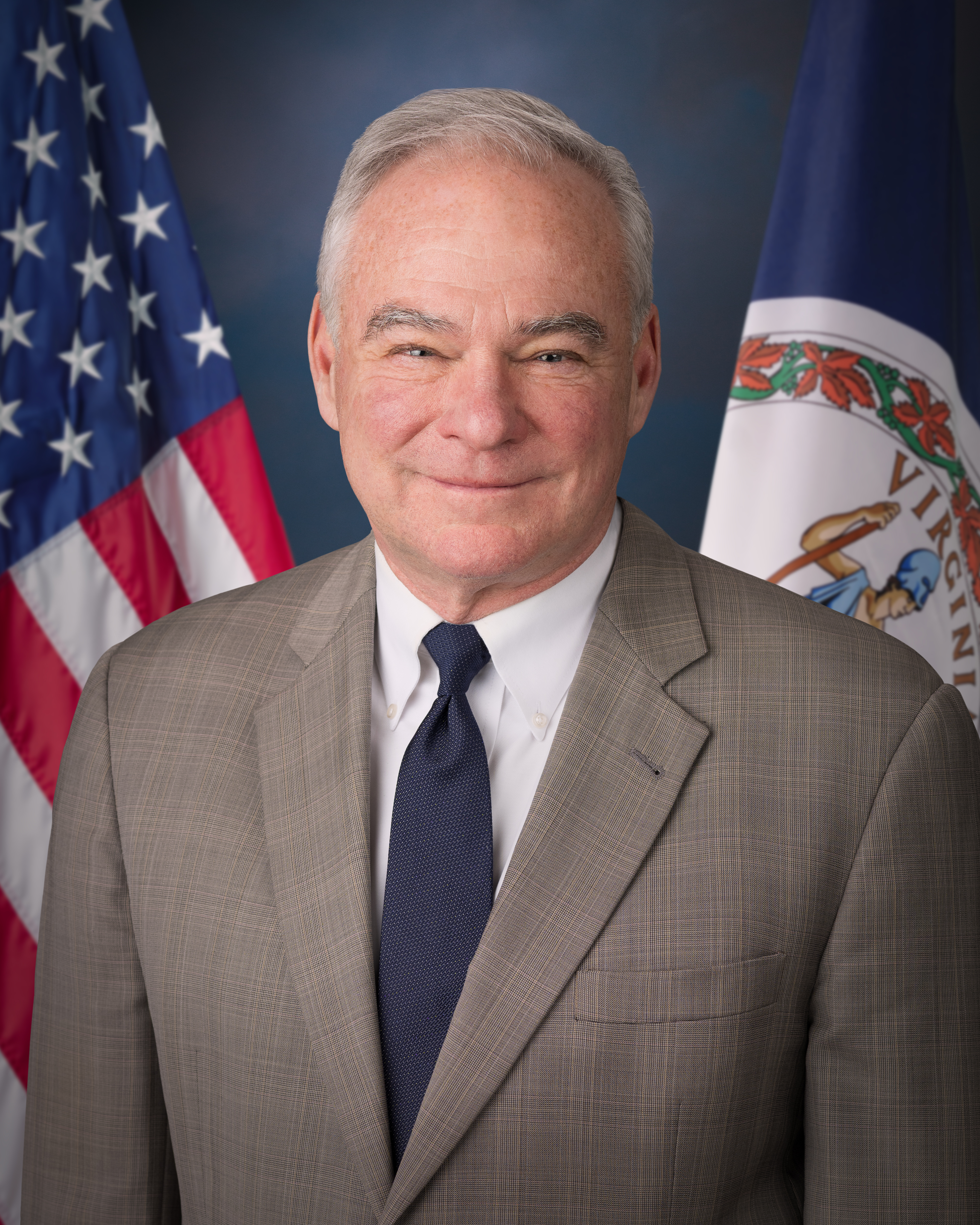
Tim Kaine (D)

(ordered by seniority)

Virginia has sent senators to the U.S. Senate since 1789. Its Senate seats were declared vacant in March 1861, due to its secession from the Union, but senators representing its western counties continued to sit until March 1865. Virginia's Senate seats were again filled from January 1870. Virginia's current senators are Democrats Mark Warner and Tim Kaine. Harry F. Byrd was Virginia's longest-serving senator (1933–1965). Both incumbent senators previously served as governor of Virginia between 2002 and 2010.

== List of senators ==
Class 1 Class 1 senators belong to the electoral cycle that most recently had regular elections in 2006, 2012, 2018, and 2024. The next election will be in 2030.						C	Class 2 Class 2 senators belong to the electoral cycle that most recently had regular elections in 2008, 2014, 2020, and 2026. The next election will be in 2032.					
#	Senator	Party	Dates in office	Electoral history	T	C	T	Electoral history	Dates in office	Party	Senator	#
1	William Grayson (Dumfries)	Anti- Admin.	Mar 4, 1789 – Mar 12, 1790	Elected in 1788. Died.	1	1st	1	Elected in 1788. Resigned.	Mar 4, 1789 – Oct 8, 1792	Anti- Admin.	Richard H. Lee (Westmoreland County)	1
Vacant			Mar 12, 1790 – Mar 31, 1790		1	1st	1	Elected in 1788. Resigned.	Mar 4, 1789 – Oct 8, 1792	Anti- Admin.	Richard H. Lee (Westmoreland County)	1
2	John Walker (Albemarle County)	Pro- Admin.	Mar 31, 1790 – Nov 9, 1790	Appointed to continue Grayson's term. Retired.	1	1st	1	Elected in 1788. Resigned.	Mar 4, 1789 – Oct 8, 1792	Anti- Admin.	Richard H. Lee (Westmoreland County)	1
3	James Monroe (Charlottesville)	Anti- Admin.	Nov 9, 1790 – May 27, 1794	Elected to finish Grayson's term.	1	1st	1	Elected in 1788. Resigned.	Mar 4, 1789 – Oct 8, 1792	Anti- Admin.	Richard H. Lee (Westmoreland County)	1
3	James Monroe (Charlottesville)	Anti- Admin.	Nov 9, 1790 – May 27, 1794	Re-elected in 1791. Resigned to become U.S. Minister Plenipotentiary to France.	2	2nd	1	Elected in 1788. Resigned.	Mar 4, 1789 – Oct 8, 1792	Anti- Admin.	Richard H. Lee (Westmoreland County)	1
3	James Monroe (Charlottesville)	Anti- Admin.	Nov 9, 1790 – May 27, 1794	Re-elected in 1791. Resigned to become U.S. Minister Plenipotentiary to France.	2	2nd	1		Oct 8, 1792 – Oct 18, 1792	Vacant		
3	James Monroe (Charlottesville)	Anti- Admin.	Nov 9, 1790 – May 27, 1794	Re-elected in 1791. Resigned to become U.S. Minister Plenipotentiary to France.	2	2nd	1	Elected to finish Lee's term.	Oct 18, 1792 – May 11, 1794	Anti- Admin.	John Taylor (Caroline County)	2
3	James Monroe (Charlottesville)	Anti- Admin.	Nov 9, 1790 – May 27, 1794	Re-elected in 1791. Resigned to become U.S. Minister Plenipotentiary to France.	2	3rd	2	Re-elected in 1793. Resigned.	Oct 18, 1792 – May 11, 1794	Anti- Admin.	John Taylor (Caroline County)	2
Vacant			May 27, 1794 – Nov 18, 1794		2	3rd	2	Re-elected in 1793. Resigned.	Oct 18, 1792 – May 11, 1794	Anti- Admin.	John Taylor (Caroline County)	2
Vacant			May 27, 1794 – Nov 18, 1794		2	3rd	2		May 11, 1794 – Dec 29, 1794	Vacant		
4	Stevens T. Mason (Dumfries)	Anti- Admin.	Nov 18, 1794 – May 10, 1803	Elected to finish Monroe's term.	2	3rd	2		May 11, 1794 – Dec 29, 1794	Vacant		
4	Stevens T. Mason (Dumfries)	Anti- Admin.	Nov 18, 1794 – May 10, 1803	Elected to finish Monroe's term.	2	3rd	2	Elected to finish Taylor's term. Re-elected in 1798, but died before new term began.	Dec 29, 1794 – Jan 24, 1799	Anti- Admin.	Henry Tazewell (Brunswick County)	3
4	Stevens T. Mason (Dumfries)	Democratic- Republican	Nov 18, 1794 – May 10, 1803	Elected to finish Monroe's term.	2	4th	2	Elected to finish Taylor's term. Re-elected in 1798, but died before new term began.	Dec 29, 1794 – Jan 24, 1799	Democratic- Republican	Henry Tazewell (Brunswick County)	3
4	Stevens T. Mason (Dumfries)	Democratic- Republican	Nov 18, 1794 – May 10, 1803	Re-elected in 1796.	3	5th	2	Elected to finish Taylor's term. Re-elected in 1798, but died before new term began.	Dec 29, 1794 – Jan 24, 1799	Democratic- Republican	Henry Tazewell (Brunswick County)	3
4	Stevens T. Mason (Dumfries)	Democratic- Republican	Nov 18, 1794 – May 10, 1803	Re-elected in 1796.	3	5th	2		Jan 24, 1799 – Dec 5, 1799	Vacant		
4	Stevens T. Mason (Dumfries)	Democratic- Republican	Nov 18, 1794 – May 10, 1803	Re-elected in 1796.	3	6th	3		Jan 24, 1799 – Dec 5, 1799	Vacant		
4	Stevens T. Mason (Dumfries)	Democratic- Republican	Nov 18, 1794 – May 10, 1803	Re-elected in 1796.	3	6th	3	Elected to finish Tazewell's term. Resigned to become collector of the port of Norfolk.	Dec 5, 1799 – May 22, 1804	Democratic- Republican	Wilson C. Nicholas (Albemarle County)	4
4	Stevens T. Mason (Dumfries)	Democratic- Republican	Nov 18, 1794 – May 10, 1803	Re-elected in 1796.	3	7th	3	Elected to finish Tazewell's term. Resigned to become collector of the port of Norfolk.	Dec 5, 1799 – May 22, 1804	Democratic- Republican	Wilson C. Nicholas (Albemarle County)	4
4	Stevens T. Mason (Dumfries)	Democratic- Republican	Nov 18, 1794 – May 10, 1803	Re-elected in 1803. Died.	4	8th	3	Elected to finish Tazewell's term. Resigned to become collector of the port of Norfolk.	Dec 5, 1799 – May 22, 1804	Democratic- Republican	Wilson C. Nicholas (Albemarle County)	4
Vacant			May 10, 1803 – Jun 4, 1803		4	8th	3	Elected to finish Tazewell's term. Resigned to become collector of the port of Norfolk.	Dec 5, 1799 – May 22, 1804	Democratic- Republican	Wilson C. Nicholas (Albemarle County)	4
5	John Taylor (Caroline County)	Democratic- Republican	Jun 4, 1803 – Dec 7, 1803	Appointed to continue Mason's term. Retired.	4	8th	3	Elected to finish Tazewell's term. Resigned to become collector of the port of Norfolk.	Dec 5, 1799 – May 22, 1804	Democratic- Republican	Wilson C. Nicholas (Albemarle County)	4
6	Abraham B. Venable (Farmville)	Democratic- Republican	Dec 7, 1803 – Jun 7, 1804	Elected to finish Mason's term. Resigned to become President of the Bank of Virginia.	4	8th	3	Elected to finish Tazewell's term. Resigned to become collector of the port of Norfolk.	Dec 5, 1799 – May 22, 1804	Democratic- Republican	Wilson C. Nicholas (Albemarle County)	4
6	Abraham B. Venable (Farmville)	Democratic- Republican	Dec 7, 1803 – Jun 7, 1804	Elected to finish Mason's term. Resigned to become President of the Bank of Virginia.	4	8th	3		May 22, 1804 – Aug 11, 1804	Vacant		
Vacant			Jun 7, 1804 – Aug 11, 1804		4	8th	3		May 22, 1804 – Aug 11, 1804	Vacant		
7	William B. Giles (Lodore)	Democratic- Republican	Aug 11, 1804 – Dec 3, 1804	Appointed to continue Mason's term. Resigned when elected to finish Tazewell's class 2 term.	4	8th	3	Appointed to continue Tazewell's term. Resigned when elected to finish Stevens T. Mason's class 1 term.	Aug 11, 1804 – Dec 3, 1804	Democratic- Republican	Andrew Moore (Lexington)	5
8	Andrew Moore (Lexington)	Democratic- Republican	Dec 4, 1804 – Mar 3, 1809	Elected to finish Mason's term. Retired.	4	8th	3	Elected to finish Tazewell's term.	Dec 4, 1804 – Mar 3, 1815	Democratic- Republican	William B. Giles (Lodore)	6
8	Andrew Moore (Lexington)	Democratic- Republican	Dec 4, 1804 – Mar 3, 1809	Elected to finish Mason's term. Retired.	4	9th	4	Re-elected in 1804.	Dec 4, 1804 – Mar 3, 1815	Democratic- Republican	William B. Giles (Lodore)	6
8	Andrew Moore (Lexington)	Democratic- Republican	Dec 4, 1804 – Mar 3, 1809	Elected to finish Mason's term. Retired.	4	10th	4	Re-elected in 1804.	Dec 4, 1804 – Mar 3, 1815	Democratic- Republican	William B. Giles (Lodore)	6
9	Richard Brent (Aquia)	Democratic- Republican	Mar 4, 1809 – Dec 30, 1814	Elected in 1809. Died.	5	11th	4	Re-elected in 1804.	Dec 4, 1804 – Mar 3, 1815	Democratic- Republican	William B. Giles (Lodore)	6
9	Richard Brent (Aquia)	Democratic- Republican	Mar 4, 1809 – Dec 30, 1814	Elected in 1809. Died.	5	12th	5	Re-elected in 1811. Resigned.	Dec 4, 1804 – Mar 3, 1815	Democratic- Republican	William B. Giles (Lodore)	6
9	Richard Brent (Aquia)	Democratic- Republican	Mar 4, 1809 – Dec 30, 1814	Elected in 1809. Died.	5	13th	5	Re-elected in 1811. Resigned.	Dec 4, 1804 – Mar 3, 1815	Democratic- Republican	William B. Giles (Lodore)	6
Vacant			Dec 30, 1814 – Jan 2, 1815		5	13th	5	Re-elected in 1811. Resigned.	Dec 4, 1804 – Mar 3, 1815	Democratic- Republican	William B. Giles (Lodore)	6
10	James Barbour (Barboursville)	Democratic- Republican	Jan 2, 1815 – Mar 7, 1825	Elected to finish Brent's term, having already been elected to the next term.	5	13th	5	Re-elected in 1811. Resigned.	Dec 4, 1804 – Mar 3, 1815	Democratic- Republican	William B. Giles (Lodore)	6
10	James Barbour (Barboursville)	Democratic- Republican	Jan 2, 1815 – Mar 7, 1825	Elected in 1814.	6	14th	5	John Eppes (DR) was elected in 1815, but declined to serve.	Mar 4, 1815 – Jan 3, 1816	Vacant		
10	James Barbour (Barboursville)	Democratic- Republican	Jan 2, 1815 – Mar 7, 1825	Elected in 1814.	6	14th	5	Elected to finish Giles's term. Lost re-election.	Jan 3, 1816 – Mar 3, 1817	Democratic- Republican	Armistead T. Mason (Loudoun County)	7
10	James Barbour (Barboursville)	Democratic- Republican	Jan 2, 1815 – Mar 7, 1825	Elected in 1814.	6	15th	6	Elected in 1816. Resigned because of ill health.	Mar 4, 1817 – Dec 4, 1819	Democratic- Republican	John Eppes (Charles City)	8
10	James Barbour (Barboursville)	Democratic- Republican	Jan 2, 1815 – Mar 7, 1825	Elected in 1814.	6	16th	6	Elected in 1816. Resigned because of ill health.	Mar 4, 1817 – Dec 4, 1819	Democratic- Republican	John Eppes (Charles City)	8
10	James Barbour (Barboursville)	Democratic- Republican	Jan 2, 1815 – Mar 7, 1825	Elected in 1814.	6	16th	6		Dec 4, 1819 – Dec 14, 1819	Vacant		
10	James Barbour (Barboursville)	Democratic- Republican	Jan 2, 1815 – Mar 7, 1825	Elected in 1814.	6	16th	6	Elected in 1819 to finish Eppes's term. Resigned.	Dec 14, 1819 – Dec 15, 1822	Democratic- Republican	James Pleasants (Goochland)	9
10	James Barbour (Barboursville)	Democratic- Republican	Jan 2, 1815 – Mar 7, 1825	Re-elected in 1821. Resigned to become U.S. Secretary of War.	7	17th	6	Elected in 1819 to finish Eppes's term. Resigned.	Dec 14, 1819 – Dec 15, 1822	Democratic- Republican	James Pleasants (Goochland)	9
10	James Barbour (Barboursville)	Democratic- Republican	Jan 2, 1815 – Mar 7, 1825	Re-elected in 1821. Resigned to become U.S. Secretary of War.	7	17th	6		Dec 15, 1822 – Dec 18, 1822	Vacant		
10	James Barbour (Barboursville)	Democratic- Republican	Jan 2, 1815 – Mar 7, 1825	Re-elected in 1821. Resigned to become U.S. Secretary of War.	7	17th	6	Elected to finish Eppes's term.	Dec 18, 1822 – Aug 21, 1824	Democratic- Republican	John Taylor (Port Royal)	10
10	James Barbour (Barboursville)	Democratic- Republican	Jan 2, 1815 – Mar 7, 1825	Re-elected in 1821. Resigned to become U.S. Secretary of War.	7	18th	7	Re-elected in 1823. Died.	Dec 18, 1822 – Aug 21, 1824	Democratic- Republican	John Taylor (Port Royal)	10
10	James Barbour (Barboursville)	Democratic- Republican	Jan 2, 1815 – Mar 7, 1825	Re-elected in 1821. Resigned to become U.S. Secretary of War.	7	18th	7		Aug 21, 1824 – Dec 7, 1824	Vacant		
10	James Barbour (Barboursville)	Democratic- Republican	Jan 2, 1815 – Mar 7, 1825	Re-elected in 1821. Resigned to become U.S. Secretary of War.	7	18th	7	Elected to finish Taylor's term.	Dec 7, 1824 – Jul 16, 1832	Democratic– Republican	Littleton Tazewell (Norfolk)	11
10	James Barbour (Barboursville)	Jacksonian	Jan 2, 1815 – Mar 7, 1825	Re-elected in 1821. Resigned to become U.S. Secretary of War.	7	19th	7	Elected to finish Taylor's term.	Dec 7, 1824 – Jul 16, 1832	Jacksonian	Littleton Tazewell (Norfolk)	11
Vacant			Mar 7, 1825 – Dec 26, 1825		7	19th	7	Elected to finish Taylor's term.	Dec 7, 1824 – Jul 16, 1832	Jacksonian	Littleton Tazewell (Norfolk)	11
11	John Randolph (Charlotte)	Jacksonian	Dec 26, 1825 – Mar 3, 1827	Appointed to finish Barbour's term. Lost election to next term.	7	19th	7	Elected to finish Taylor's term.	Dec 7, 1824 – Jul 16, 1832	Jacksonian	Littleton Tazewell (Norfolk)	11
12	John Tyler (Gloucester)	Jacksonian	Mar 4, 1827 – Feb 29, 1836	Elected in 1827.	8	20th	7	Elected to finish Taylor's term.	Dec 7, 1824 – Jul 16, 1832	Jacksonian	Littleton Tazewell (Norfolk)	11
12	John Tyler (Gloucester)	Jacksonian	Mar 4, 1827 – Feb 29, 1836	Elected in 1827.	8	21st	8	Re-elected in 1829. Resigned.	Dec 7, 1824 – Jul 16, 1832	Jacksonian	Littleton Tazewell (Norfolk)	11
12	John Tyler (Gloucester)	Jacksonian	Mar 4, 1827 – Feb 29, 1836	Elected in 1827.	8	22nd	8	Re-elected in 1829. Resigned.	Dec 7, 1824 – Jul 16, 1832	Jacksonian	Littleton Tazewell (Norfolk)	11
12	John Tyler (Gloucester)	Jacksonian	Mar 4, 1827 – Feb 29, 1836	Elected in 1827.	8	22nd	8		Jul 16, 1832 – Dec 10, 1832	Vacant		
12	John Tyler (Gloucester)	Jacksonian	Mar 4, 1827 – Feb 29, 1836	Elected in 1827.	8	22nd	8	Elected to finish Tazewell's term. Resigned.	Dec 10, 1832 – Feb 22, 1834	Jacksonian	William C. Rives (Nelson County)	12
12	John Tyler (Gloucester)	National; Republican	Mar 4, 1827 – Feb 29, 1836	Re-elected in 1833. Resigned.	9	23rd	8	Elected to finish Tazewell's term. Resigned.	Dec 10, 1832 – Feb 22, 1834	Jacksonian	William C. Rives (Nelson County)	12
12	John Tyler (Gloucester)	National; Republican	Mar 4, 1827 – Feb 29, 1836	Re-elected in 1833. Resigned.	9	23rd	8		Feb 22, 1834 – Feb 26, 1834	Vacant		
12	John Tyler (Gloucester)	National; Republican	Mar 4, 1827 – Feb 29, 1836	Re-elected in 1833. Resigned.	9	23rd	8	Elected to finish Tazewell's term.	Feb 26, 1834 – Jul 4, 1836	National; Republican	Benjamin W. Leigh (Richmond)	13
12	John Tyler (Gloucester)	National; Republican	Mar 4, 1827 – Feb 29, 1836	Re-elected in 1833. Resigned.	9	24th	9	Re-elected in 1835. Resigned.	Feb 26, 1834 – Jul 4, 1836	National; Republican	Benjamin W. Leigh (Richmond)	13
Vacant			Feb 29, 1836 – Mar 3, 1836		9	24th	9	Re-elected in 1835. Resigned.	Feb 26, 1834 – Jul 4, 1836	National; Republican	Benjamin W. Leigh (Richmond)	13
13	William C. Rives (Nelson County)	Jacksonian	Mar 4, 1836 – Mar 3, 1839	Elected to finish Tyler's term	9	24th	9	Re-elected in 1835. Resigned.	Feb 26, 1834 – Jul 4, 1836	National; Republican	Benjamin W. Leigh (Richmond)	13
13	William C. Rives (Nelson County)	Jacksonian	Mar 4, 1836 – Mar 3, 1839	Elected to finish Tyler's term	9	24th	9		Jul 4, 1836 – Dec 12, 1836	Vacant		
13	William C. Rives (Nelson County)	Jacksonian	Mar 4, 1836 – Mar 3, 1839	Elected to finish Tyler's term	9	24th	9	Elected to finish Leigh's term. Resigned to become judge of the Virginia Supreme Court of Appeals.	Dec 12, 1836 – Mar 13, 1837	Jacksonian	Richard E. Parker (Snickersville)	14
13	William C. Rives (Nelson County)	Democratic	Mar 4, 1836 – Mar 3, 1839	Elected to finish Tyler's term	9	25th	9	Elected to finish Leigh's term. Resigned to become judge of the Virginia Supreme Court of Appeals.	Dec 12, 1836 – Mar 13, 1837	Democratic	Richard E. Parker (Snickersville)	14
13	William C. Rives (Nelson County)	Democratic	Mar 4, 1836 – Mar 3, 1839	Elected to finish Tyler's term	9	25th	9	Elected to finish Leigh's term. Lost re-election.	Mar 14, 1837 – Mar 3, 1841	Democratic	William H. Roane (Richmond)	15
13	Vacant		Mar 3, 1839 – Jan 18, 1841	Legislature failed to elect.	10	26th	9	Elected to finish Leigh's term. Lost re-election.	Mar 14, 1837 – Mar 3, 1841	Democratic	William H. Roane (Richmond)	15
13	William C. Rives (Nelson County)	Whig	Jan 18, 1841 – Mar 3, 1845	Re-elected late in 1841.	10	26th	9	Elected to finish Leigh's term. Lost re-election.	Mar 14, 1837 – Mar 3, 1841	Democratic	William H. Roane (Richmond)	15
13	William C. Rives (Nelson County)	Whig	Jan 18, 1841 – Mar 3, 1845	Re-elected late in 1841.	10	27th	10	Elected in 1840. Lost re-election.	Mar 4, 1841 – Mar 3, 1847	Whig	William S. Archer (Elk Hill)	16
13	William C. Rives (Nelson County)	Whig	Jan 18, 1841 – Mar 3, 1845	Re-elected late in 1841.	10	28th	10	Elected in 1840. Lost re-election.	Mar 4, 1841 – Mar 3, 1847	Whig	William S. Archer (Elk Hill)	16
Vacant			Mar 4, 1845 – Dec 3, 1845		11	29th	10	Elected in 1840. Lost re-election.	Mar 4, 1841 – Mar 3, 1847	Whig	William S. Archer (Elk Hill)	16
14	Isaac S. Pennybacker (New Market)	Democratic	Dec 3, 1845 – Jan 12, 1847	Elected to finish the vacant term. Died.	11	29th	10	Elected in 1840. Lost re-election.	Mar 4, 1841 – Mar 3, 1847	Whig	William S. Archer (Elk Hill)	16
Vacant			Jan 12, 1847 – Jan 21, 1847		11	29th	10	Elected in 1840. Lost re-election.	Mar 4, 1841 – Mar 3, 1847	Whig	William S. Archer (Elk Hill)	16
15	James M. Mason (Winchester)	Democratic	Jan 21, 1847 – Mar 28, 1861	Elected to finish the vacant term that happened in 1845.	11	29th	10	Elected in 1840. Lost re-election.	Mar 4, 1841 – Mar 3, 1847	Whig	William S. Archer (Elk Hill)	16
15	James M. Mason (Winchester)	Democratic	Jan 21, 1847 – Mar 28, 1861	Elected to finish the vacant term that happened in 1845.	11	30th	11	Elected in 1846.	Mar 4, 1847 – Mar 28, 1861	Democratic	Robert M. T. Hunter (Lloyds)	17
15	James M. Mason (Winchester)	Democratic	Jan 21, 1847 – Mar 28, 1861	Elected to finish the vacant term that happened in 1845.	11	31st	11	Elected in 1846.	Mar 4, 1847 – Mar 28, 1861	Democratic	Robert M. T. Hunter (Lloyds)	17
15	James M. Mason (Winchester)	Democratic	Jan 21, 1847 – Mar 28, 1861	Re-elected in 1850.	12	32nd	11	Elected in 1846.	Mar 4, 1847 – Mar 28, 1861	Democratic	Robert M. T. Hunter (Lloyds)	17
15	James M. Mason (Winchester)	Democratic	Jan 21, 1847 – Mar 28, 1861	Re-elected in 1850.	12	33rd	12	Re-elected in 1852.	Mar 4, 1847 – Mar 28, 1861	Democratic	Robert M. T. Hunter (Lloyds)	17
15	James M. Mason (Winchester)	Democratic	Jan 21, 1847 – Mar 28, 1861	Re-elected in 1850.	12	34th	12	Re-elected in 1852.	Mar 4, 1847 – Mar 28, 1861	Democratic	Robert M. T. Hunter (Lloyds)	17
15	James M. Mason (Winchester)	Democratic	Jan 21, 1847 – Mar 28, 1861	Re-elected in 1856. Expelled for his support of the Confederacy.	13	35th	12	Re-elected in 1852.	Mar 4, 1847 – Mar 28, 1861	Democratic	Robert M. T. Hunter (Lloyds)	17
15	James M. Mason (Winchester)	Democratic	Jan 21, 1847 – Mar 28, 1861	Re-elected in 1856. Expelled for his support of the Confederacy.	13	36th	13	Re-elected in 1858. Expelled for his support of the Confederacy.	Mar 4, 1847 – Mar 28, 1861	Democratic	Robert M. T. Hunter (Lloyds)	17
15	James M. Mason (Winchester)	Democratic	Jan 21, 1847 – Mar 28, 1861	Re-elected in 1856. Expelled for his support of the Confederacy.	13	37th	13	Re-elected in 1858. Expelled for his support of the Confederacy.	Mar 4, 1847 – Mar 28, 1861	Democratic	Robert M. T. Hunter (Lloyds)	17
Vacant			Jul 11, 1861 – Jul 13, 1861		13	37th	13		Jul 11, 1861 – Jul 13, 1861	Vacant		
16	Waitman T. Willey (Morgantown)	Union	Jul 13, 1861 – Mar 3, 1863	Elected to finish Mason's term. Retired.	13	37th	13	Elected to finish Hunter's term.	Jul 13, 1861 – Mar 3, 1865	Union	John S. Carlile (Clarksburg)	18
17	Lemuel J. Bowden (Williamsburg)	Union	Mar 4, 1863 – Jan 2, 1864	Elected in 1863. Died.	14	38th	13	Elected to finish Hunter's term.	Jul 13, 1861 – Mar 3, 1865	Union	John S. Carlile (Clarksburg)	18
Vacant			Jan 2, 1864 – Jan 26, 1870	Joseph Segar (U) presented his credentials, but was not seated. Civil War and Reconstruction.	14	38th	13	Elected to finish Hunter's term.	Jul 13, 1861 – Mar 3, 1865	Union	John S. Carlile (Clarksburg)	18
Vacant			Jan 2, 1864 – Jan 26, 1870	Joseph Segar (U) presented his credentials, but was not seated. Civil War and Reconstruction.	14	39th	14	John Underwood (U) presented his credentials, but was not seated. Civil War and Reconstruction.	Mar 4, 1865 – Jan 26, 1870	Vacant		
Vacant			Jan 2, 1864 – Jan 26, 1870	Joseph Segar (U) presented his credentials, but was not seated. Civil War and Reconstruction.	14	40th	14	John Underwood (U) presented his credentials, but was not seated. Civil War and Reconstruction.	Mar 4, 1865 – Jan 26, 1870	Vacant		
Vacant			Jan 2, 1864 – Jan 26, 1870	Joseph Segar (U) presented his credentials, but was not seated. Civil War and Reconstruction.	15	41st	14	John Underwood (U) presented his credentials, but was not seated. Civil War and Reconstruction.	Mar 4, 1865 – Jan 26, 1870	Vacant		
18	John F. Lewis (Port Republic)	Republican	Jan 26, 1870 – Mar 3, 1875	Elected to finish the vacant term. Retired.	15	41st	14	Elected to finish the vacant term.	Jan 26, 1870 – Mar 3, 1871	Democratic	John W. Johnston (Abingdon)	19
18	John F. Lewis (Port Republic)	Republican	Jan 26, 1870 – Mar 3, 1875	Elected to finish the vacant term. Retired.	15	42nd	15		Mar 4, 1871 – Mar 15, 1871	Vacant		19
18	John F. Lewis (Port Republic)	Republican	Jan 26, 1870 – Mar 3, 1875	Elected to finish the vacant term. Retired.	15	42nd	15	Re-elected late in 1871.	Mar 15, 1871 – Mar 3, 1883	Democratic	John W. Johnston (Abingdon)	19
18	John F. Lewis (Port Republic)	Republican	Jan 26, 1870 – Mar 3, 1875	Elected to finish the vacant term. Retired.	15	43rd	15	Re-elected late in 1871.	Mar 15, 1871 – Mar 3, 1883	Democratic	John W. Johnston (Abingdon)	19
19	Robert E. Withers (Wytheville)	Democratic	Mar 4, 1875 – Mar 3, 1881	Elected in 1875. Lost re-election.	16	44th	15	Re-elected late in 1871.	Mar 15, 1871 – Mar 3, 1883	Democratic	John W. Johnston (Abingdon)	19
19	Robert E. Withers (Wytheville)	Democratic	Mar 4, 1875 – Mar 3, 1881	Elected in 1875. Lost re-election.	16	45th	16	Re-elected in 1877. Lost re-election.	Mar 15, 1871 – Mar 3, 1883	Democratic	John W. Johnston (Abingdon)	19
19	Robert E. Withers (Wytheville)	Democratic	Mar 4, 1875 – Mar 3, 1881	Elected in 1875. Lost re-election.	16	46th	16	Re-elected in 1877. Lost re-election.	Mar 15, 1871 – Mar 3, 1883	Democratic	John W. Johnston (Abingdon)	19
20	William Mahone (Petersburg)	Readjuster	Mar 4, 1881 – Mar 3, 1887	Elected in 1881. Lost re-election.	17	47th	16	Re-elected in 1877. Lost re-election.	Mar 15, 1871 – Mar 3, 1883	Democratic	John W. Johnston (Abingdon)	19
20	William Mahone (Petersburg)	Readjuster	Mar 4, 1881 – Mar 3, 1887	Elected in 1881. Lost re-election.	17	48th	17	Elected early in 1881. Retired.	Mar 4, 1883 – Mar 3, 1889	Readjuster	Harrison H. Riddleberger (Woodstock)	20
20	William Mahone (Petersburg)	Readjuster	Mar 4, 1881 – Mar 3, 1887	Elected in 1881. Lost re-election.	17	49th	17	Elected early in 1881. Retired.	Mar 4, 1883 – Mar 3, 1889	Readjuster	Harrison H. Riddleberger (Woodstock)	20
21	John W. Daniel (Lynchburg)	Democratic	Mar 4, 1887 – Jun 29, 1910	Elected in 1887.	18	50th	17	Elected early in 1881. Retired.	Mar 4, 1883 – Mar 3, 1889	Readjuster	Harrison H. Riddleberger (Woodstock)	20
21	John W. Daniel (Lynchburg)	Democratic	Mar 4, 1887 – Jun 29, 1910	Elected in 1887.	18	51st	18	Elected early in 1887. Died.	Mar 4, 1889 – May 14, 1892	Democratic	John S. Barbour Jr. (Alexandria)	21
21	John W. Daniel (Lynchburg)	Democratic	Mar 4, 1887 – Jun 29, 1910	Elected in 1887.	18	52nd	18	Elected early in 1887. Died.	Mar 4, 1889 – May 14, 1892	Democratic	John S. Barbour Jr. (Alexandria)	21
21	John W. Daniel (Lynchburg)	Democratic	Mar 4, 1887 – Jun 29, 1910	Elected in 1887.	18	52nd	18		May 14, 1892 – May 28, 1892	Vacant		
21	John W. Daniel (Lynchburg)	Democratic	Mar 4, 1887 – Jun 29, 1910	Elected in 1887.	18	52nd	18	Appointed to continue Barbour's term. Elected in 1893 to finish Barbour's term. Retired.	May 28, 1892 – Mar 3, 1895	Democratic	Eppa Hunton (Warrenton)	22
21	John W. Daniel (Lynchburg)	Democratic	Mar 4, 1887 – Jun 29, 1910	Re-elected early in 1891.	19	53rd	18	Appointed to continue Barbour's term. Elected in 1893 to finish Barbour's term. Retired.	May 28, 1892 – Mar 3, 1895	Democratic	Eppa Hunton (Warrenton)	22
21	John W. Daniel (Lynchburg)	Democratic	Mar 4, 1887 – Jun 29, 1910	Re-elected early in 1891.	19	54th	19	Elected early in 1893.	Mar 4, 1895 – Nov 12, 1919	Democratic	Thomas S. Martin (Charlottesville)	23
21	John W. Daniel (Lynchburg)	Democratic	Mar 4, 1887 – Jun 29, 1910	Re-elected early in 1891.	19	55th	19	Elected early in 1893.	Mar 4, 1895 – Nov 12, 1919	Democratic	Thomas S. Martin (Charlottesville)	23
21	John W. Daniel (Lynchburg)	Democratic	Mar 4, 1887 – Jun 29, 1910	Re-elected in 1899.	20	56th	19	Elected early in 1893.	Mar 4, 1895 – Nov 12, 1919	Democratic	Thomas S. Martin (Charlottesville)	23
21	John W. Daniel (Lynchburg)	Democratic	Mar 4, 1887 – Jun 29, 1910	Re-elected in 1899.	20	57th	20	Re-elected early in 1899.	Mar 4, 1895 – Nov 12, 1919	Democratic	Thomas S. Martin (Charlottesville)	23
21	John W. Daniel (Lynchburg)	Democratic	Mar 4, 1887 – Jun 29, 1910	Re-elected in 1899.	20	58th	20	Re-elected early in 1899.	Mar 4, 1895 – Nov 12, 1919	Democratic	Thomas S. Martin (Charlottesville)	23
21	John W. Daniel (Lynchburg)	Democratic	Mar 4, 1887 – Jun 29, 1910	Re-elected in 1904. Re-elected in 1910, but died.	21	59th	20	Re-elected early in 1899.	Mar 4, 1895 – Nov 12, 1919	Democratic	Thomas S. Martin (Charlottesville)	23
21	John W. Daniel (Lynchburg)	Democratic	Mar 4, 1887 – Jun 29, 1910	Re-elected in 1904. Re-elected in 1910, but died.	21	60th	21	Re-elected in 1906.	Mar 4, 1895 – Nov 12, 1919	Democratic	Thomas S. Martin (Charlottesville)	23
21	John W. Daniel (Lynchburg)	Democratic	Mar 4, 1887 – Jun 29, 1910	Re-elected in 1904. Re-elected in 1910, but died.	21	61st	21	Re-elected in 1906.	Mar 4, 1895 – Nov 12, 1919	Democratic	Thomas S. Martin (Charlottesville)	23
Vacant			Jun 29, 1910 – Aug 1, 1910	Vacant	21	61st	21	Re-elected in 1906.	Mar 4, 1895 – Nov 12, 1919	Democratic	Thomas S. Martin (Charlottesville)	23
22	Claude A. Swanson (Chatham)	Democratic	Aug 1, 1910 – Mar 3, 1933	Appointed to finish Daniel's last term.	21	61st	21	Re-elected in 1906.	Mar 4, 1895 – Nov 12, 1919	Democratic	Thomas S. Martin (Charlottesville)	23
22	Claude A. Swanson (Chatham)	Democratic	Aug 1, 1910 – Mar 3, 1933	Re-appointed to begin Daniel's next term. Elected in 1912 to finish Daniel's next term.	22	62nd	21	Re-elected in 1906.	Mar 4, 1895 – Nov 12, 1919	Democratic	Thomas S. Martin (Charlottesville)	23
22	Claude A. Swanson (Chatham)	Democratic	Aug 1, 1910 – Mar 3, 1933	Re-appointed to begin Daniel's next term. Elected in 1912 to finish Daniel's next term.	22	63rd	22	Re-elected in 1912.	Mar 4, 1895 – Nov 12, 1919	Democratic	Thomas S. Martin (Charlottesville)	23
22	Claude A. Swanson (Chatham)	Democratic	Aug 1, 1910 – Mar 3, 1933	Re-appointed to begin Daniel's next term. Elected in 1912 to finish Daniel's next term.	22	64th	22	Re-elected in 1912.	Mar 4, 1895 – Nov 12, 1919	Democratic	Thomas S. Martin (Charlottesville)	23
22	Claude A. Swanson (Chatham)	Democratic	Aug 1, 1910 – Mar 3, 1933	Re-elected in 1916.	23	65th	22	Re-elected in 1912.	Mar 4, 1895 – Nov 12, 1919	Democratic	Thomas S. Martin (Charlottesville)	23
22	Claude A. Swanson (Chatham)	Democratic	Aug 1, 1910 – Mar 3, 1933	Re-elected in 1916.	23	66th	23	Re-elected in 1918. Died.	Mar 4, 1895 – Nov 12, 1919	Democratic	Thomas S. Martin (Charlottesville)	23
22	Claude A. Swanson (Chatham)	Democratic	Aug 1, 1910 – Mar 3, 1933	Re-elected in 1916.	23	66th	23		Nov 12, 1919 – Feb 2, 1920	Vacant		
22	Claude A. Swanson (Chatham)	Democratic	Aug 1, 1910 – Mar 3, 1933	Re-elected in 1916.	23	66th	23	Appointed Nov 18, 1919 to continue Martin's term, but remained U.S. Secretary of the Treasury until he resigned and then he became United States Senator. Elected in 1920 to finish Martin's term.	Feb 2, 1920 – May 28, 1946	Democratic	Carter Glass (Lynchburg)	24
22	Claude A. Swanson (Chatham)	Democratic	Aug 1, 1910 – Mar 3, 1933	Re-elected in 1916.	23	67th	23	Appointed Nov 18, 1919 to continue Martin's term, but remained U.S. Secretary of the Treasury until he resigned and then he became United States Senator. Elected in 1920 to finish Martin's term.	Feb 2, 1920 – May 28, 1946	Democratic	Carter Glass (Lynchburg)	24
22	Claude A. Swanson (Chatham)	Democratic	Aug 1, 1910 – Mar 3, 1933	Re-elected in 1922.	24	68th	23	Appointed Nov 18, 1919 to continue Martin's term, but remained U.S. Secretary of the Treasury until he resigned and then he became United States Senator. Elected in 1920 to finish Martin's term.	Feb 2, 1920 – May 28, 1946	Democratic	Carter Glass (Lynchburg)	24
22	Claude A. Swanson (Chatham)	Democratic	Aug 1, 1910 – Mar 3, 1933	Re-elected in 1922.	24	69th	24	Re-elected in 1924.	Feb 2, 1920 – May 28, 1946	Democratic	Carter Glass (Lynchburg)	24
22	Claude A. Swanson (Chatham)	Democratic	Aug 1, 1910 – Mar 3, 1933	Re-elected in 1922.	24	70th	24	Re-elected in 1924.	Feb 2, 1920 – May 28, 1946	Democratic	Carter Glass (Lynchburg)	24
22	Claude A. Swanson (Chatham)	Democratic	Aug 1, 1910 – Mar 3, 1933	Re-elected in 1928. Resigned to become U.S. Secretary of the Navy.	25	71st	24	Re-elected in 1924.	Feb 2, 1920 – May 28, 1946	Democratic	Carter Glass (Lynchburg)	24
22	Claude A. Swanson (Chatham)	Democratic	Aug 1, 1910 – Mar 3, 1933	Re-elected in 1928. Resigned to become U.S. Secretary of the Navy.	25	72nd	25	Re-elected in 1930.	Feb 2, 1920 – May 28, 1946	Democratic	Carter Glass (Lynchburg)	24
23	Harry F. Byrd (Berryville)	Democratic	Mar 4, 1933 – Nov 10, 1965	Appointed to continue Swanson's term. Elected in 1933 to finish Swanson's term.	25	73rd	25	Re-elected in 1930.	Feb 2, 1920 – May 28, 1946	Democratic	Carter Glass (Lynchburg)	24
23	Harry F. Byrd (Berryville)	Democratic	Mar 4, 1933 – Nov 10, 1965	Re-elected in 1934.	26	74th	25	Re-elected in 1930.	Feb 2, 1920 – May 28, 1946	Democratic	Carter Glass (Lynchburg)	24
23	Harry F. Byrd (Berryville)	Democratic	Mar 4, 1933 – Nov 10, 1965	Re-elected in 1934.	26	75th	26	Re-elected in 1936.	Feb 2, 1920 – May 28, 1946	Democratic	Carter Glass (Lynchburg)	24
23	Harry F. Byrd (Berryville)	Democratic	Mar 4, 1933 – Nov 10, 1965	Re-elected in 1934.	26	76th	26	Re-elected in 1936.	Feb 2, 1920 – May 28, 1946	Democratic	Carter Glass (Lynchburg)	24
23	Harry F. Byrd (Berryville)	Democratic	Mar 4, 1933 – Nov 10, 1965	Re-elected in 1940.	27	77th	26	Re-elected in 1936.	Feb 2, 1920 – May 28, 1946	Democratic	Carter Glass (Lynchburg)	24
23	Harry F. Byrd (Berryville)	Democratic	Mar 4, 1933 – Nov 10, 1965	Re-elected in 1940.	27	78th	27	Re-elected in 1942. Died.	Feb 2, 1920 – May 28, 1946	Democratic	Carter Glass (Lynchburg)	24
23	Harry F. Byrd (Berryville)	Democratic	Mar 4, 1933 – Nov 10, 1965	Re-elected in 1940.	27	79th	27	Re-elected in 1942. Died.	Feb 2, 1920 – May 28, 1946	Democratic	Carter Glass (Lynchburg)	24
23	Harry F. Byrd (Berryville)	Democratic	Mar 4, 1933 – Nov 10, 1965	Re-elected in 1940.	27	79th	27		May 28, 1946 – May 31, 1946	Vacant		
23	Harry F. Byrd (Berryville)	Democratic	Mar 4, 1933 – Nov 10, 1965	Re-elected in 1940.	27	79th	27	Appointed to continue Glass's term. Retired.	May 31, 1946 – Nov 5, 1946	Democratic	Thomas G. Burch (Martinsville)	25
23	Harry F. Byrd (Berryville)	Democratic	Mar 4, 1933 – Nov 10, 1965	Re-elected in 1940.	27	79th	27	Elected to finish Glass's term.	Nov 5, 1946 – Dec 30, 1966	Democratic	A. Willis Robertson (Lexington)	26
23	Harry F. Byrd (Berryville)	Democratic	Mar 4, 1933 – Nov 10, 1965	Re-elected in 1946.	28	80th	27	Elected to finish Glass's term.	Nov 5, 1946 – Dec 30, 1966	Democratic	A. Willis Robertson (Lexington)	26
23	Harry F. Byrd (Berryville)	Democratic	Mar 4, 1933 – Nov 10, 1965	Re-elected in 1946.	28	81st	28	Re-elected in 1948.	Nov 5, 1946 – Dec 30, 1966	Democratic	A. Willis Robertson (Lexington)	26
23	Harry F. Byrd (Berryville)	Democratic	Mar 4, 1933 – Nov 10, 1965	Re-elected in 1946.	28	82nd	28	Re-elected in 1948.	Nov 5, 1946 – Dec 30, 1966	Democratic	A. Willis Robertson (Lexington)	26
23	Harry F. Byrd (Berryville)	Democratic	Mar 4, 1933 – Nov 10, 1965	Re-elected in 1952.	29	83rd	28	Re-elected in 1948.	Nov 5, 1946 – Dec 30, 1966	Democratic	A. Willis Robertson (Lexington)	26
23	Harry F. Byrd (Berryville)	Democratic	Mar 4, 1933 – Nov 10, 1965	Re-elected in 1952.	29	84th	29	Re-elected in 1954.	Nov 5, 1946 – Dec 30, 1966	Democratic	A. Willis Robertson (Lexington)	26
23	Harry F. Byrd (Berryville)	Democratic	Mar 4, 1933 – Nov 10, 1965	Re-elected in 1952.	29	85th	29	Re-elected in 1954.	Nov 5, 1946 – Dec 30, 1966	Democratic	A. Willis Robertson (Lexington)	26
23	Harry F. Byrd (Berryville)	Democratic	Mar 4, 1933 – Nov 10, 1965	Re-elected in 1958.	30	86th	29	Re-elected in 1954.	Nov 5, 1946 – Dec 30, 1966	Democratic	A. Willis Robertson (Lexington)	26
23	Harry F. Byrd (Berryville)	Democratic	Mar 4, 1933 – Nov 10, 1965	Re-elected in 1958.	30	87th	30	Re-elected in 1960. Lost re-nomination and resigned early to give his successor preferential seniority.	Nov 5, 1946 – Dec 30, 1966	Democratic	A. Willis Robertson (Lexington)	26
23	Harry F. Byrd (Berryville)	Democratic	Mar 4, 1933 – Nov 10, 1965	Re-elected in 1958.	30	88th	30	Re-elected in 1960. Lost re-nomination and resigned early to give his successor preferential seniority.	Nov 5, 1946 – Dec 30, 1966	Democratic	A. Willis Robertson (Lexington)	26
23	Harry F. Byrd (Berryville)	Democratic	Mar 4, 1933 – Nov 10, 1965	Re-elected in 1964. Resigned for health reasons.	31	89th	30	Re-elected in 1960. Lost re-nomination and resigned early to give his successor preferential seniority.	Nov 5, 1946 – Dec 30, 1966	Democratic	A. Willis Robertson (Lexington)	26
Vacant			Nov 10, 1965 – Nov 12, 1965		31	89th	30	Re-elected in 1960. Lost re-nomination and resigned early to give his successor preferential seniority.	Nov 5, 1946 – Dec 30, 1966	Democratic	A. Willis Robertson (Lexington)	26
24	Harry F. Byrd Jr. (Winchester)	Democratic	Nov 12, 1965 – Jan 3, 1983	Appointed to continue his father's term. Elected in 1966 to finish his father's term.	31	89th	30	Re-elected in 1960. Lost re-nomination and resigned early to give his successor preferential seniority.	Nov 5, 1946 – Dec 30, 1966	Democratic	A. Willis Robertson (Lexington)	26
24	Harry F. Byrd Jr. (Winchester)	Democratic	Nov 12, 1965 – Jan 3, 1983	Appointed to continue his father's term. Elected in 1966 to finish his father's term.	31	89th	30	Appointed to finish Robertson's term, having been elected to the next term.	Dec 31, 1966 – Jan 3, 1973	Democratic	William Spong (Portsmouth)	27
24	Harry F. Byrd Jr. (Winchester)	Democratic	Nov 12, 1965 – Jan 3, 1983	Appointed to continue his father's term. Elected in 1966 to finish his father's term.	31	90th	31	Elected in 1966. Lost re-election.	Dec 31, 1966 – Jan 3, 1973	Democratic	William Spong (Portsmouth)	27
24	Harry F. Byrd Jr. (Winchester)	Democratic	Nov 12, 1965 – Jan 3, 1983	Appointed to continue his father's term. Elected in 1966 to finish his father's term.	31	91st	31	Elected in 1966. Lost re-election.	Dec 31, 1966 – Jan 3, 1973	Democratic	William Spong (Portsmouth)	27
24	Harry F. Byrd Jr. (Winchester)	Independent Democrat	Nov 12, 1965 – Jan 3, 1983	Re-elected in 1970 as an Independent, but referred to himself as an independent Democrat.	32	92nd	31	Elected in 1966. Lost re-election.	Dec 31, 1966 – Jan 3, 1973	Democratic	William Spong (Portsmouth)	27
24	Harry F. Byrd Jr. (Winchester)	Independent Democrat	Nov 12, 1965 – Jan 3, 1983	Re-elected in 1970 as an Independent, but referred to himself as an independent Democrat.	32	93rd	32	Elected in 1972. Retired and resigned early to give his successor preferential seniority.	Jan 3, 1973 – Jan 1, 1979	Republican	William Scott (Fairfax)	28
24	Harry F. Byrd Jr. (Winchester)	Independent Democrat	Nov 12, 1965 – Jan 3, 1983	Re-elected in 1970 as an Independent, but referred to himself as an independent Democrat.	32	94th	32	Elected in 1972. Retired and resigned early to give his successor preferential seniority.	Jan 3, 1973 – Jan 1, 1979	Republican	William Scott (Fairfax)	28
24	Harry F. Byrd Jr. (Winchester)	Independent Democrat	Nov 12, 1965 – Jan 3, 1983	Re-elected in 1976. Retired.	33	95th	32	Elected in 1972. Retired and resigned early to give his successor preferential seniority.	Jan 3, 1973 – Jan 1, 1979	Republican	William Scott (Fairfax)	28
24	Harry F. Byrd Jr. (Winchester)	Independent Democrat	Nov 12, 1965 – Jan 3, 1983	Re-elected in 1976. Retired.	33	95th	32	Appointed to finish Scott's term, having been elected to the next term.	Jan 2, 1979 – Jan 3, 2009	Republican	John Warner (Alexandria)	29
24	Harry F. Byrd Jr. (Winchester)	Independent Democrat	Nov 12, 1965 – Jan 3, 1983	Re-elected in 1976. Retired.	33	96th	33	Elected in 1978.	Jan 2, 1979 – Jan 3, 2009	Republican	John Warner (Alexandria)	29
24	Harry F. Byrd Jr. (Winchester)	Independent Democrat	Nov 12, 1965 – Jan 3, 1983	Re-elected in 1976. Retired.	33	97th	33	Elected in 1978.	Jan 2, 1979 – Jan 3, 2009	Republican	John Warner (Alexandria)	29
25	Paul Trible (Richmond)	Republican	Jan 3, 1983 – Jan 3, 1989	Elected in 1982. Retired.	34	98th	33	Elected in 1978.	Jan 2, 1979 – Jan 3, 2009	Republican	John Warner (Alexandria)	29
25	Paul Trible (Richmond)	Republican	Jan 3, 1983 – Jan 3, 1989	Elected in 1982. Retired.	34	99th	34	Re-elected in 1984.	Jan 2, 1979 – Jan 3, 2009	Republican	John Warner (Alexandria)	29
25	Paul Trible (Richmond)	Republican	Jan 3, 1983 – Jan 3, 1989	Elected in 1982. Retired.	34	100th	34	Re-elected in 1984.	Jan 2, 1979 – Jan 3, 2009	Republican	John Warner (Alexandria)	29
26	Chuck Robb (McLean)	Democratic	Jan 3, 1989 – Jan 3, 2001	Elected in 1988.	35	101st	34	Re-elected in 1984.	Jan 2, 1979 – Jan 3, 2009	Republican	John Warner (Alexandria)	29
26	Chuck Robb (McLean)	Democratic	Jan 3, 1989 – Jan 3, 2001	Elected in 1988.	35	102nd	35	Re-elected in 1990.	Jan 2, 1979 – Jan 3, 2009	Republican	John Warner (Alexandria)	29
26	Chuck Robb (McLean)	Democratic	Jan 3, 1989 – Jan 3, 2001	Elected in 1988.	35	103rd	35	Re-elected in 1990.	Jan 2, 1979 – Jan 3, 2009	Republican	John Warner (Alexandria)	29
26	Chuck Robb (McLean)	Democratic	Jan 3, 1989 – Jan 3, 2001	Re-elected in 1994. Lost re-election.	36	104th	35	Re-elected in 1990.	Jan 2, 1979 – Jan 3, 2009	Republican	John Warner (Alexandria)	29
26	Chuck Robb (McLean)	Democratic	Jan 3, 1989 – Jan 3, 2001	Re-elected in 1994. Lost re-election.	36	105th	36	Re-elected in 1996.	Jan 2, 1979 – Jan 3, 2009	Republican	John Warner (Alexandria)	29
26	Chuck Robb (McLean)	Democratic	Jan 3, 1989 – Jan 3, 2001	Re-elected in 1994. Lost re-election.	36	106th	36	Re-elected in 1996.	Jan 2, 1979 – Jan 3, 2009	Republican	John Warner (Alexandria)	29
27	George Allen (Virginia Beach)	Republican	Jan 3, 2001 – Jan 3, 2007	Elected in 2000. Lost re-election.	37	107th	36	Re-elected in 1996.	Jan 2, 1979 – Jan 3, 2009	Republican	John Warner (Alexandria)	29
27	George Allen (Virginia Beach)	Republican	Jan 3, 2001 – Jan 3, 2007	Elected in 2000. Lost re-election.	37	108th	37	Re-elected in 2002. Retired.	Jan 2, 1979 – Jan 3, 2009	Republican	John Warner (Alexandria)	29
27	George Allen (Virginia Beach)	Republican	Jan 3, 2001 – Jan 3, 2007	Elected in 2000. Lost re-election.	37	109th	37	Re-elected in 2002. Retired.	Jan 2, 1979 – Jan 3, 2009	Republican	John Warner (Alexandria)	29
28	Jim Webb (Falls Church)	Democratic	Jan 3, 2007 – Jan 3, 2013	Elected in 2006. Retired.	38	110th	37	Re-elected in 2002. Retired.	Jan 2, 1979 – Jan 3, 2009	Republican	John Warner (Alexandria)	29
28	Jim Webb (Falls Church)	Democratic	Jan 3, 2007 – Jan 3, 2013	Elected in 2006. Retired.	38	111th	38	Elected in 2008.	Jan 3, 2009 – present	Democratic	Mark Warner (Alexandria)	30
28	Jim Webb (Falls Church)	Democratic	Jan 3, 2007 – Jan 3, 2013	Elected in 2006. Retired.	38	112th	38	Elected in 2008.	Jan 3, 2009 – present	Democratic	Mark Warner (Alexandria)	30
29	Tim Kaine (Richmond)	Democratic	Jan 3, 2013 – present	Elected in 2012.	39	113th	38	Elected in 2008.	Jan 3, 2009 – present	Democratic	Mark Warner (Alexandria)	30
29	Tim Kaine (Richmond)	Democratic	Jan 3, 2013 – present	Elected in 2012.	39	114th	39	Re-elected in 2014.	Jan 3, 2009 – present	Democratic	Mark Warner (Alexandria)	30
29	Tim Kaine (Richmond)	Democratic	Jan 3, 2013 – present	Elected in 2012.	39	115th	39	Re-elected in 2014.	Jan 3, 2009 – present	Democratic	Mark Warner (Alexandria)	30
29	Tim Kaine (Richmond)	Democratic	Jan 3, 2013 – present	Re-elected in 2018.	40	116th	39	Re-elected in 2014.	Jan 3, 2009 – present	Democratic	Mark Warner (Alexandria)	30
29	Tim Kaine (Richmond)	Democratic	Jan 3, 2013 – present	Re-elected in 2018.	40	117th	40	Re-elected in 2020.	Jan 3, 2009 – present	Democratic	Mark Warner (Alexandria)	30
29	Tim Kaine (Richmond)	Democratic	Jan 3, 2013 – present	Re-elected in 2018.	40	118th	40	Re-elected in 2020.	Jan 3, 2009 – present	Democratic	Mark Warner (Alexandria)	30
29	Tim Kaine (Richmond)	Democratic	Jan 3, 2013 – present	Re-elected in 2024.	41	119th	40	Re-elected in 2020.	Jan 3, 2009 – present	Democratic	Mark Warner (Alexandria)	30
29	Tim Kaine (Richmond)	Democratic	Jan 3, 2013 – present	Re-elected in 2024.	41	120th	41	Re-elected in 2026. Retiring at the end of term.	Jan 3, 2009 – present	Democratic	Mark Warner (Alexandria)	30
29	Tim Kaine (Richmond)	Democratic	Jan 3, 2013 – present	Re-elected in 2024.	41	121st	41	Re-elected in 2026. Retiring at the end of term.	Jan 3, 2009 – present	Democratic	Mark Warner (Alexandria)	30
To be determined in the 2030 election.					42	122nd	41	Re-elected in 2026. Retiring at the end of term.	Jan 3, 2009 – present	Democratic	Mark Warner (Alexandria)	30
To be determined in the 2030 election.					42	123rd	42	To be determined in the 2032 election.				

== See also ==
- Elections in Virginia
- List of United States representatives from Virginia
- Virginia's congressional delegations
