= Wallace Estill Sr. House =

Historic house in West Virginia, United States

- U.S. National Register of Historic Places
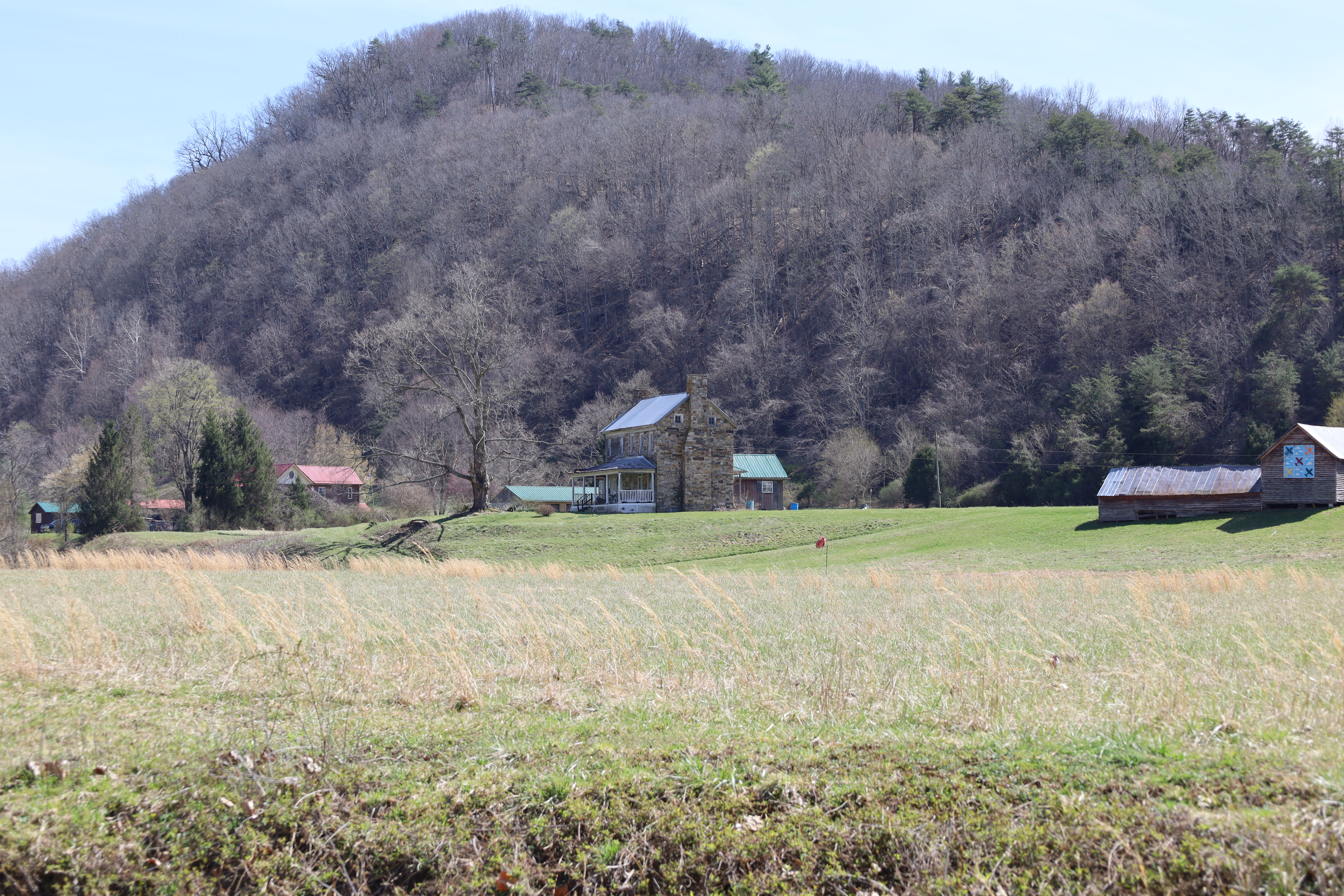
- The house in 2022

- Location within West Virginia Location within the United States
- Nearest city: Union, West Virginia
- Coordinates: 37°31′34″N 80°37′43″W
- Area: 1 acre (0.40 ha)
- Built: 1773
- Architect: Wallace Estille Sr.
- NRHP reference No.: 84003634
- Added to NRHP: April 9, 1984

Wallace Estill Sr. House, also known as the Old Stone House, is a historic home located near Union, Monroe County, West Virginia. It was built in 1773, is of stone and frame construction. The stone part measures 20 feet, 6 inches, by 25 feet, 6 inches. The house has two stone chimneys from which three fireplaces and two flues for woodstoves are provided. It is a good example of pioneer architecture. The house is the ancestral home of United States Senator Chuck Robb as his grandmother, Susan Gay Estill, was the great-granddaughter of its owner Isaac Estill.

Wallace Estill's son, Captain James Estill, was a Kentucky militia officer during the Revolutionary War, after whom Estill County, Kentucky was named. Captain Estill was killed at the Battle of Little Mountain, also known as Estill's Defeat, during the Revolutionary War.

It was listed on the National Register of Historic Places in 1984.
