= 1981 Virginia gubernatorial election =

- November 3, 1981
- Turnout: 64.8% (voting eligible)
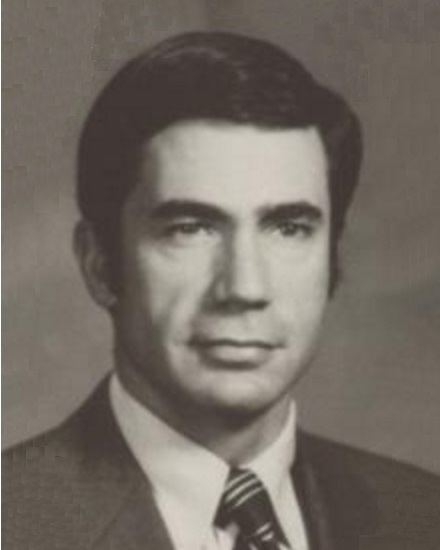

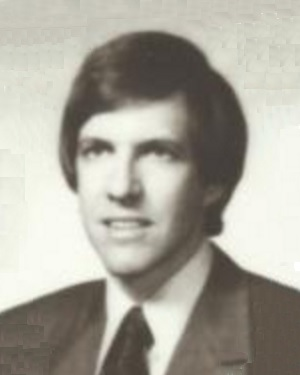
Nominee	Chuck Robb	Marshall Coleman
Party	Democratic	Republican
Popular vote	760,357	659,398
Percentage	53.56%	46.44%
- County and independent city results Robb: 50–60% 60–70% 70–80% 80–90% Coleman: 40–50% 50–60% 60–70%
Governor before election
John N. Dalton
Republican
Elected Governor
Chuck Robb
Democratic

In the 1981 Virginia gubernatorial election, Republican incumbent Governor John N. Dalton was unable to seek re-election due to term limits. Chuck Robb, the Lieutenant Governor of Virginia, was nominated by the Democratic Party to run against the Republican nominee, state Attorney General J. Marshall Coleman.

Robb's victory ended 12 consecutive years of Republican control of the Governor's Mansion.

Fairfax County voted Democratic for Governor for the first time since 1949, whilst as of 2025 this remains the last occasion when Mathews County or Mecklenburg County voted Democratic for Governor.

== General election ==
=== Candidates ===
- Chuck Robb, Lieutenant Governor of Virginia (Democratic)
- J. Marshall Coleman, Attorney General of Virginia (Republican)

=== Results ===
1981 Virginia gubernatorial election
Party	Candidate	Votes	%	±%
Democratic	Charles S. Robb	760,357	53.56%	+10.32%
Republican	J. Marshall Coleman	659,398	46.44%	−9.41%
Majority		100,959	7.11%	−5.51%
Turnout		1,419,755		
Democratic gain from Republican		Swing		

==== Results by county or independent city ====
1981 Virginia gubernatorial election by county or independent city
	Charles Spittal Robb Democratic		John Marshall Coleman Republican		Various candidates Write-ins		Margin		Total votes cast
	#	%	#	%	#	%	#	%	Total votes cast
Accomack County	4,114	52.06%	3,786	47.91%	2	0.03%	328	4.15%	7,902
Albemarle County	6,954	48.79%	7,273	51.02%	27	0.19%	-319	-2.24%	14,254
Alleghany County	2,545	62.67%	1,515	37.31%	1	0.02%	1,030	25.36%	4,061
Amelia County	1,536	51.41%	1,451	48.56%	1	0.03%	85	2.84%	2,988
Amherst County	3,549	51.24%	3,377	48.76%			172	2.48%	6,926
Appomattox County	2,219	59.89%	1,486	40.11%			733	19.78%	3,705
Arlington County	27,472	59.20%	18,870	40.66%	62	0.13%	8,602	18.54%	46,404
Augusta County	5,980	42.20%	8,189	57.78%	3	0.02%	-2,209	-15.59%	14,172
Bath County	831	55.03%	678	44.90%	1	0.07%	153	10.13%	1,510
Bedford County	4,797	50.48%	4,703	49.49%	3	0.03%	94	0.99%	9,503
Bland County	1,010	52.25%	920	47.59%	3	0.16%	90	4.66%	1,933
Botetourt County	3,677	54.45%	3,076	45.55%			601	8.90%	6,753
Brunswick County	2,659	60.31%	1,748	39.65%	2	0.05%	911	20.66%	4,409
Buchanan County	4,971	65.28%	2,644	34.72%			2,327	30.56%	7,615
Buckingham County	2,415	69.26%	1,068	30.63%	4	0.11%	1,347	38.63%	3,487
Campbell County	4,650	42.84%	6,202	57.13%	3	0.03%	-1,552	-14.30%	10,855
Caroline County	2,612	63.88%	1,477	36.12%			1,135	27.76%	4,089
Carroll County	3,053	43.08%	4,033	56.92%			-980	-13.83%	7,086
Charles City County	1,411	80.03%	352	19.97%			1,059	60.07%	1,763
Charlotte County	1,886	51.80%	1,719	47.21%	36	0.99%	167	4.59%	3,641
Chesterfield County	16,639	38.09%	27,032	61.89%	8	0.02%	-10,393	-23.79%	43,679
Clarke County	1,258	49.88%	1,261	50.00%	3	0.12%	-3	-0.12%	2,522
Craig County	941	63.03%	552	36.97%			389	26.05%	1,493
Culpeper County	2,731	47.33%	3,039	52.67%			-308	-5.34%	5,770
Cumberland County	1,311	52.38%	1,192	47.62%			119	4.75%	2,503
Dickenson County	3,977	60.76%	2,566	39.21%	2	0.03%	1,411	21.56%	6,545
Dinwiddie County	3,191	57.06%	2,401	42.94%			790	14.13%	5,592
Essex County	1,190	48.75%	1,251	51.25%			-61	-2.50%	2,441
Fairfax County	85,818	51.76%	79,909	48.20%	73	0.04%	5,909	3.56%	165,800
Fauquier County	3,891	46.69%	4,442	53.30%	1	0.01%	-551	-6.61%	8,334
Floyd County	1,634	46.81%	1,856	53.17%	1	0.03%	-222	-6.36%	3,491
Fluvanna County	1,239	51.47%	1,163	48.32%	5	0.21%	76	3.16%	2,407
Franklin County	5,828	62.33%	3,512	37.56%	10	0.11%	2,316	24.77%	9,350
Frederick County	3,499	43.35%	4,572	56.65%			-1,073	-13.29%	8,071
Giles County	3,302	59.56%	2,242	40.44%			1,060	19.12%	5,544
Gloucester County	3,337	51.96%	3,083	48.01%	2	0.03%	254	3.96%	6,422
Goochland County	2,257	53.79%	1,937	46.16%	2	0.05%	320	7.63%	4,196
Grayson County	2,616	50.37%	2,578	49.63%			38	0.73%	5,194
Greene County	763	41.72%	1,066	58.28%			-303	-16.57%	1,829
Greensville County	1,790	59.08%	1,240	40.92%			550	18.15%	3,030
Halifax County	3,847	47.86%	3,993	49.68%	198	2.46%	-146	-1.82%	8,038
Hanover County	6,637	39.95%	9,974	60.03%	3	0.02%	-3,337	-20.09%	16,614
Henrico County	27,054	42.73%	36,246	57.24%	20	0.03%	-9,192	-14.52%	63,320
Henry County	7,415	57.00%	5,591	42.98%	2	0.02%	1,824	14.02%	13,008
Highland County	510	44.82%	628	55.18%			-118	-10.37%	1,138
Isle of Wight County	3,953	59.49%	2,691	40.50%	1	0.02%	1,262	18.99%	6,645
James City County	3,223	50.84%	3,117	49.16%			106	1.67%	6,340
King and Queen County	1,099	61.60%	685	38.40%			414	23.21%	1,784
King George County	1,172	48.91%	1,224	51.09%			-52	-2.17%	2,396
King William County	1,415	50.34%	1,396	49.66%			19	0.68%	2,811
Lancaster County	1,474	40.59%	2,156	59.38%	1	0.03%	-682	-18.78%	3,631
Lee County	4,368	59.79%	2,938	40.21%			1,430	19.57%	7,306
Loudoun County	7,334	49.12%	7,594	50.86%	2	0.01%	-260	-1.74%	14,930
Louisa County	2,727	57.13%	2,026	42.45%	20	0.42%	701	14.69%	4,773
Lunenburg County	1,875	55.62%	1,492	44.26%	4	0.12%	383	11.36%	3,371
Madison County	1,561	50.27%	1,544	49.73%			17	0.55%	3,105
Mathews County	1,565	50.68%	1,523	49.32%			42	1.36%	3,088
Mecklenburg County	3,415	50.63%	3,329	49.36%	1	0.01%	86	1.28%	6,745
Middlesex County	1,519	52.06%	1,398	47.91%	1	0.03%	121	4.15%	2,918
Montgomery County	7,451	54.47%	6,225	45.51%	2	0.01%	1,226	8.96%	13,678
Nelson County	2,106	58.63%	1,486	41.37%			620	17.26%	3,592
New Kent County	1,227	49.84%	1,235	50.16%			-8	-0.32%	2,462
Northampton County	2,310	59.32%	1,584	40.68%			726	18.64%	3,894
Northumberland County	1,577	43.38%	2,058	56.62%			-481	-13.23%	3,635
Nottoway County	2,674	54.68%	2,212	45.24%	4	0.08%	462	9.45%	4,890
Orange County	2,449	50.62%	2,387	49.34%	2	0.04%	62	1.28%	4,838
Page County	2,678	48.57%	2,834	51.40%	2	0.04%	-156	-2.83%	5,514
Patrick County	2,847	58.56%	2,014	41.42%	1	0.02%	833	17.13%	4,862
Pittsylvania County	6,708	42.90%	8,930	57.10%			-2,222	-14.21%	15,638
Powhatan County	1,669	44.29%	2,099	55.71%			-430	-11.41%	3,768
Prince Edward County	2,729	55.66%	2,165	44.16%	9	0.18%	564	11.50%	4,903
Prince George County	2,302	49.06%	2,389	50.92%	1	0.02%	-87	-1.85%	4,692
Prince William County	13,387	51.41%	12,644	48.56%	8	0.03%	743	2.85%	26,039
Pulaski County	5,152	55.36%	4,149	44.58%	5	0.05%	1,003	10.78%	9,306
Rappahannock County	1,009	57.59%	743	42.41%			266	15.18%	1,752
Richmond County	1,012	46.40%	1,169	53.60%			-157	-7.20%	2,181
Roanoke County	12,038	49.99%	12,040	50.00%	2	0.01%	-2	-0.01%	24,080
Rockbridge County	2,406	52.12%	2,205	47.77%	5	0.11%	201	4.35%	4,616
Rockingham County	5,779	39.71%	8,756	60.17%	17	0.12%	-2,977	-20.46%	14,552
Russell County	4,753	60.64%	3,085	39.36%			1,668	21.28%	7,838
Scott County	3,264	48.80%	3,424	51.20%			-160	-2.39%	6,688
Shenandoah County	3,608	40.86%	5,223	59.14%			-1,615	-18.29%	8,831
Smyth County	4,678	51.00%	4,494	49.00%			184	2.01%	9,172
Southampton County	3,061	57.83%	2,232	42.17%			829	15.66%	5,293
Spotsylvania County	4,088	54.21%	3,453	45.79%			635	8.42%	7,541
Stafford County	4,625	47.01%	5,214	52.99%			-589	-5.99%	9,839
Surry County	1,727	71.42%	690	28.54%	1	0.04%	1,037	42.89%	2,418
Sussex County	2,339	66.62%	1,172	33.38%			1,167	33.24%	3,511
Tazewell County	5,988	59.02%	4,156	40.96%	2	0.02%	1,832	18.06%	10,146
Warren County	3,086	55.08%	2,517	44.92%			569	10.16%	5,603
Washington County	5,617	49.67%	5,690	50.32%	1	0.01%	-73	-0.65%	11,308
Westmoreland County	2,266	56.13%	1,771	43.87%			495	12.26%	4,037
Wise County	6,459	64.08%	3,620	35.92%			2,839	28.17%	10,079
Wythe County	3,898	52.43%	3,537	47.57%			361	4.86%	7,435
York County	4,615	49.81%	4,649	50.18%	1	0.01%	-34	-0.37%	9,265
Alexandria City	15,892	60.21%	10,487	39.73%	14	0.05%	5,405	20.48%	26,393
Bedford City	1,141	56.68%	872	43.32%			269	13.36%	2,013
Bristol City	2,339	54.03%	1,989	45.95%	1	0.02%	350	8.09%	4,329
Buena Vista City	993	62.14%	604	37.80%	1	0.06%	389	24.34%	1,598
Charlottesville City	6,069	59.34%	4,114	40.22%	45	0.44%	1,955	19.11%	10,228
Chesapeake City	16,335	60.99%	10,448	39.01%	2	0.01%	5,887	21.98%	26,785
Clifton Forge City	1,022	63.20%	593	36.67%	2	0.12%	429	26.53%	1,617
Colonial Heights City	2,153	36.28%	3,780	63.70%	1	0.02%	-1,627	-27.42%	5,934
Covington City	1,961	67.74%	934	32.26%			1,027	35.47%	2,895
Danville City	6,108	38.85%	9,603	61.08%	12	0.08%	-3,495	-22.23%	15,723
Emporia City	783	47.66%	860	52.34%			-77	-4.69%	1,643
Fairfax City	3,021	50.24%	2,992	49.76%			29	0.48%	6,013
Falls Church City	2,000	55.59%	1,597	44.39%	1	0.03%	403	11.20%	3,598
Franklin City	1,199	59.30%	823	40.70%			376	18.60%	2,022
Fredericksburg City	2,226	55.19%	1,807	44.81%			419	10.39%	4,033
Galax City	999	52.72%	896	47.28%			103	5.44%	1,895
Hampton City	17,509	61.18%	11,103	38.80%	5	0.02%	6,406	22.39%	28,617
Harrisonburg City	2,156	46.62%	2,456	53.10%	13	0.28%	-300	-6.49%	4,625
Hopewell City	3,230	48.02%	3,496	51.97%	1	0.01%	-266	-3.95%	6,727
Lexington City	976	55.80%	772	44.14%	1	0.06%	204	11.66%	1,749
Lynchburg City	8,269	44.26%	10,399	55.66%	14	0.07%	-2,130	-11.40%	18,682
Manassas City	1,727	48.52%	1,832	51.48%			-105	-2.95%	3,559
Manassas Park City	468	52.88%	417	47.12%			51	5.76%	885
Martinsville City	3,100	54.95%	2,537	44.97%	5	0.09%	563	9.98%	5,642
Newport News City	20,240	57.70%	14,824	42.26%	12	0.03%	5,416	15.44%	35,076
Norfolk City	34,780	67.75%	16,526	32.19%	30	0.06%	18,254	35.56%	51,336
Norton City	695	65.88%	360	34.12%			335	31.75%	1,055
Petersburg City	7,296	65.88%	3,776	34.10%	2	0.02%	3,520	31.79%	11,074
Poquoson City	1,044	38.71%	1,653	61.29%			-609	-22.58%	2,697
Portsmouth City	19,718	70.03%	8,427	29.93%	11	0.04%	11,291	40.10%	28,156
Radford City	2,070	57.31%	1,542	42.69%			528	14.62%	3,612
Richmond City	45,378	64.48%	24,926	35.42%	71	0.10%	20,452	29.06%	70,375
Roanoke City	16,648	61.61%	10,367	38.37%	6	0.02%	6,281	23.24%	27,021
Salem City	3,700	52.13%	3,395	47.84%	2	0.03%	305	4.30%	7,097
South Boston City	847	43.98%	1,065	55.30%	14	0.73%	-218	-11.32%	1,926
Staunton City	3,138	49.18%	3,241	50.80%	1	0.02%	-103	-1.61%	6,380
Suffolk City	8,414	64.10%	4,712	35.90%			3,702	28.20%	13,126
Virginia Beach City	27,993	50.83%	27,060	49.14%	16	0.03%	933	1.69%	55,069
Waynesboro City	1,876	37.90%	3,072	62.06%	2	0.04%	-1,196	-24.16%	4,950
Williamsburg City	1,224	54.62%	1,017	45.38%			207	9.24%	2,241
Winchester City	2,522	47.50%	2,787	52.50%			-265	-4.99%	5,309
Totals	760,357	53.52%	659,398	46.42%	856	0.06%	100,959	7.11%	1,420,611

Counties and independent cities that flipped from Democratic to Republican

- King George
- Scott
- Stafford

Counties and independent cities that flipped from Republican to Democratic

- Amelia (no municipalities)
- Amherst
- Accomack
- Appomattox
- Arlington
- Bath
- Bedford
- Bland
- Botetourt
- Brunswick
- Buckingham
- Charlotte
- Cumberland
- Fairfax
- Fluvanna
- Giles
- Gloucester
- Goochland (no municipalities)
- Grayson
- Henry
- James City (no municipalities)
- King William
- Louisa
- Lunenburg
- Madison
- Mathews
- Mecklenburg
- Middlesex
- Montgomery
- Northampton
- Nottoway
- Orange
- Patrick
- Prince William
- Prince Edward
- Pulaski
- Rockbridge
- Southampton
- Smyth
- Tazewell
- Warren
- Westmoreland
- Wythe
- Bedford (independent city)
- Bristol (independent city)
- Charlottesville (independent city)
- Clifton Forge (independent city)
- Fairfax (independent city)
- Falls Church (independent city)
- Fredericksburg (independent city)
- Galax (independent city)
- Lexington (independent city)
- Martinsville (independent city)
- Newport News (independent city)
- Radford (independent city)
- Richmond (independent city)
- Roanoke (independent city)
- Salem (independent city)
- Williamsburg (independent city)
- Virginia Beach (independent city)
