= 2000 United States Senate election in Virginia =

- November 7, 2000
- Turnout: 54.0% (voting eligible)
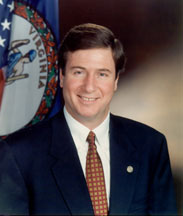

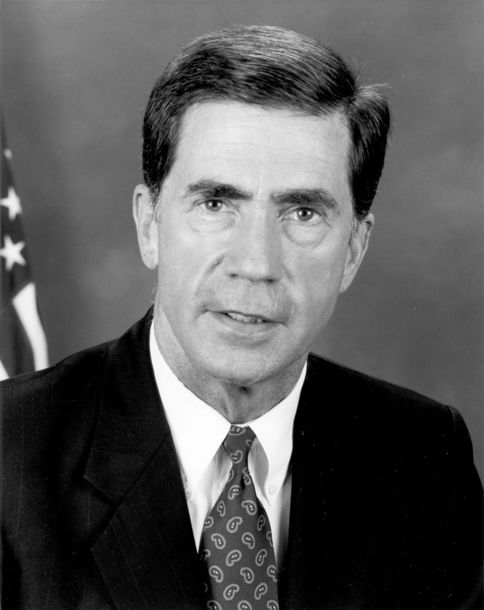
| Nominee | George Allen | Chuck Robb |
| Party | Republican | Democratic |
| Popular vote | 1,420,460 | 1,296,093 |
| Percentage | 52.26% | 47.68% |
- Allen: 50–60% 60–70% 70–80% 80–90% Robb: 50–60% 60–70% 70–80% 80–90% >90% Tie: 50%
U.S. senator before election
Chuck Robb
Democratic
Elected U.S. Senator
George Allen
Republican

The 2000 United States Senate election in Virginia was held on November 7, 2000. Democratic incumbent Chuck Robb ran for re-election to a third term but was defeated by former Virginia governor George Allen.

As of 2026, this is the last time that Republicans won the Class 1 Senate seat in Virginia.

== General election ==
=== Candidates ===
- George Allen, former governor of Virginia and former U.S. representative from Chesterfield County (Republican)
- Chuck Robb, incumbent U.S. senator since 1989 and former governor of Virginia (Democratic)

=== Debates ===
- Complete video of debate, September 24, 2000
- Complete video of debate, September 25, 2000
- Complete video of debate, October 22, 2000

=== Polling ===
| Poll source | Date(s) | Sample size | Margin of error | Chuck Robb (D) | George Allen (R) | Other / undecided (Note: Calculated by taking the difference of 100% and all other candidates combined.) |
|---|---|---|---|---|---|---|
| SurveyUSA | November 4, 2000 | 500 | — | 44% | 54% | 2% |
| Harris Insights & Analytics | November 3, 2000 | 7,462 | — | 47% | 52% | 1% |
| Mason-Dixon Polling & Strategy | October 31, 2000 | 625 | — | 44% | 49% | 7% |
| Rasmussen Reports | October 30, 2000 | 897 | — | 44% | 50% | 6% |
| Richmond Times-Dispatch | October 30, 2000 | 735 | — | 43% | 45% | 12% |
| SurveyUSA | October 28–29, 2000 | 500 | — | 46% | 53% | 1% |
| Mason-Dixon Polling & Strategy | October 25, 2000 | 625 | — | 44% | 47% | 9% |
| ABC News/The Washington Post | October 24, 2000 | 1,009 | — | 46% | 48% | 6% |
| Rasmussen Reports | October 24, 2000 | 1,100 | — | 42% | 50% | 8% |
| Virginia Commonwealth University | October 21, 2000 | 596 | — | 39% | 54% | 7% |
| SurveyUSA | October 15–16, 2000 | [data missing] | — | 48% | 51% | 1% |
| SurveyUSA | October 8–9, 2000 | [data missing] | — | 47% | 51% | 2% |
| SurveyUSA | October 1–2, 2000 | [data missing] | — | 41% | 56% | 3% |
| SurveyUSA | September 24–25, 2000 | [data missing] | — | 43% | 57% | 0% |

=== Results ===
United States Senate election in Virginia, 2000
| Party | Candidate | Votes | % | ±% |
|---|---|---|---|---|
| Republican | George Allen | 1,420,460 | 52.26% | +9.38% |
| Democratic | Chuck Robb (incumbent) | 1,296,093 | 47.68% | +2.07% |
| Write-in | | 1,748 | 0.06% | -0.01% |
| Majority | | 124,367 | 4.58% | +1.85% |
| Turnout | | 2,718,301 | | |
| Republican gain from Democratic | | | | |

==== Counties and independent cities that flipped from Democratic to Republican ====
- Amelia (no municipalities)
- Amherst (largest city: Amherst)
- Chesapeake (independent city)
- Bedford (independent city)
- Buckingham (largest city: Dillwyn)
- Buena Vista (independent city)
- James City (no municipalities)
- King and Queen (largest CDP: King and Queen Courthouse)
- Lynchburg (independent city)
- Montgomery (largest city: Blacksburg)
- Russell (largest city: Lebanon)
- Nelson (largest city: Nellysford)
- Wise (largest city: Big Stone Gap)

==== Counties and independent cities that flipped from Republican to Democratic ====
- Prince Edward (largest city: Farmville)

== See also ==
- 2000 United States Senate elections
