= 1960 United States Senate election in Virginia =

- November 8, 1960
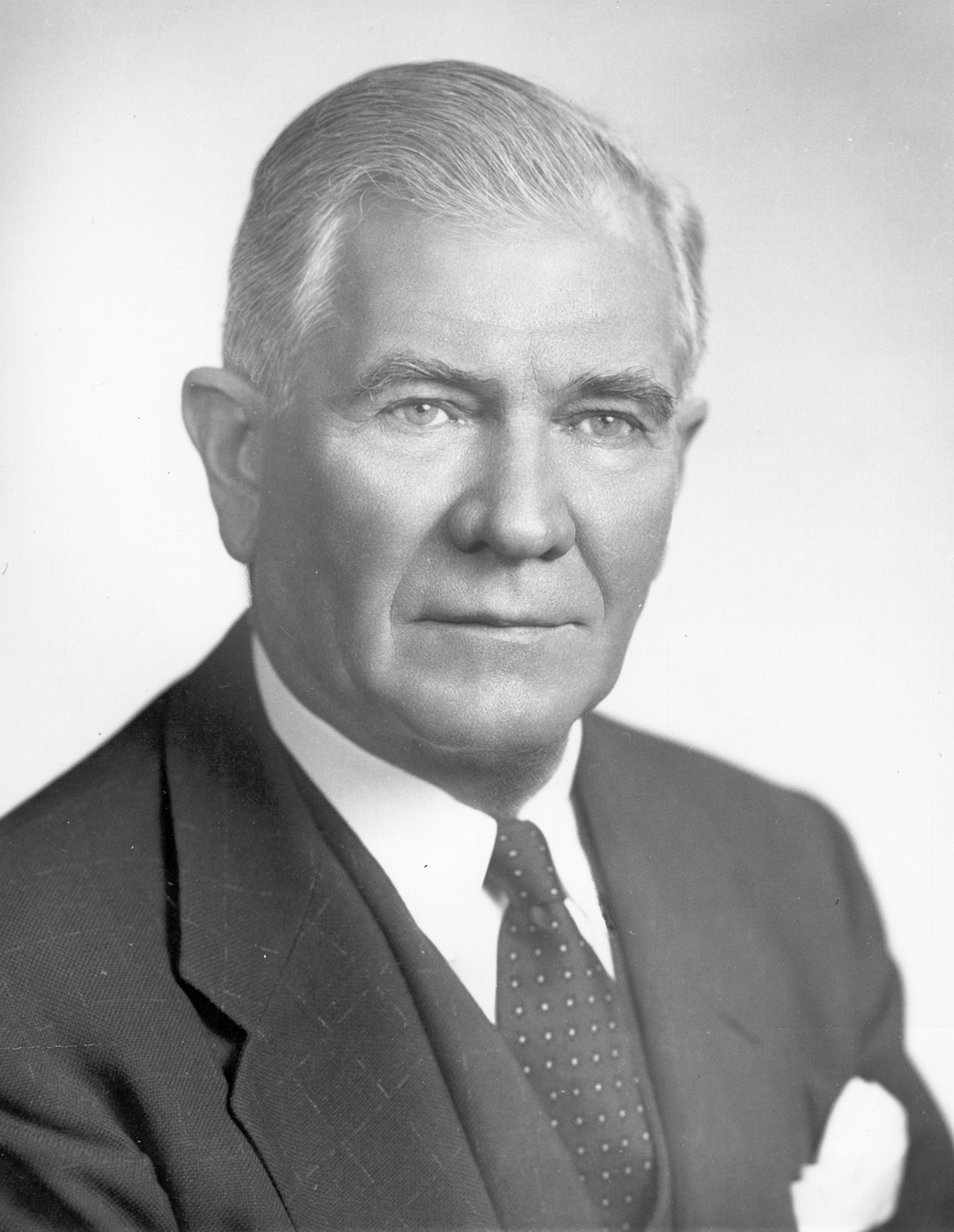

| Nominee | Absalom Willis Robertson | Stuart D. Baker |
| Party | Democratic | Independent Democrat |
| Popular vote | 506,169 | 88,718 |
| Percentage | 81.27% | 14.24% |
- County and independent city results Robertson: 60–70% 70–80% 80–90% >90% Baker: 50–60%
U.S. senator before election
Absalom Willis Robertson
Democratic
Elected U.S. Senator
Absalom Willis Robertson
Democratic

The 1960 United States Senate election in Virginia was held on November 8, 1960. Democratic incumbent Senator Absalom Willis Robertson defeated Independent Democrat Stuart Baker and Social Democrat Clarke Robb and was re-elected to a third term in office.

== Results ==
United States Senate election in Virginia, 1960
| Party | Candidate | Votes | % | ±% |
|---|---|---|---|---|
| Democratic | Absalom Willis Robertson (inc.) | 506,169 | 81.27% | +1.39% |
| Independent Democrat | Stuart D. Baker | 88,718 | 14.24% | +3.58% |
| Social Democratic | Clarke T. Robb | 26,783 | 4.30% | −5.14% |
| Write-ins | | 1,150 | 0.18% | +0.16% |
| Majority | | 417,451 | 67.03% | −2.19% |
| Turnout | | 622,820 | | |
| Democratic hold | | | | |
