= Chuck Robb =

American politician and military officer (born 1939)

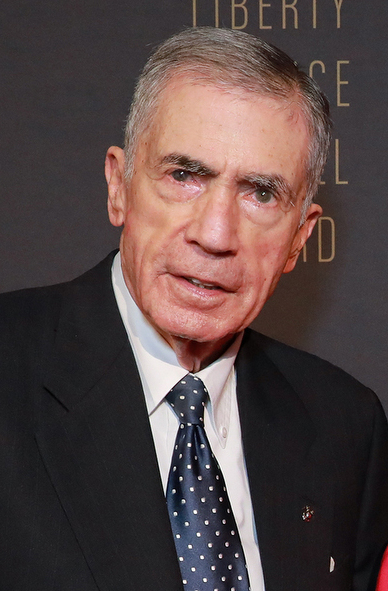
- Robb in 2019

Chair of the Iraq Intelligence Commission
- In office February 6, 2004 – March 31, 2005 Serving with Laurence Silberman
- President: George W. Bush
- Preceded by: Position established
- Succeeded by: Position abolished

United States Senator from Virginia
- In office January 3, 1989 – January 3, 2001
- Preceded by: Paul Trible
- Succeeded by: George Allen

64th Governor of Virginia
- In office January 16, 1982 – January 18, 1986
- Lieutenant: Dick Davis
- Preceded by: John N. Dalton
- Succeeded by: Gerald L. Baliles

33rd Lieutenant Governor of Virginia
- In office January 14, 1978 – January 16, 1982
- Governor: John N. Dalton
- Preceded by: John N. Dalton
- Succeeded by: Dick Davis

21st Chair of the National Lieutenant Governors Association
- In office 1980–1981
- Preceded by: Bill Phelps
- Succeeded by: Mike Curb

Personal details
- Born: Charles Spittal Robb; June 26, 1939 (age 87) Phoenix, Arizona, U.S.
- Party: Democratic
- Spouse: Lynda Johnson (m. 1967)
- Children: 3
- Relatives: Johnson family (by marriage)
- Education: University of Wisconsin, Madison (BA); University of Virginia (JD)

Military service
- Branch/service: United States Marine Corps
- Years of service: 1961–1970
- Rank: Major
- Battles/wars: Vietnam War
- Awards: Bronze Star Medal; Presidential Service Badge

Charles Spittal Robb (born June 26, 1939) is an American former U.S. Marine Corps officer and politician who served as the 64th governor of Virginia from 1982 to 1986 and a United States senator representing Virginia from 1989 until 2001. A member of the Democratic Party, Robb sought a third term in the U.S. Senate in 2000, but was defeated by Republican George Allen, another former governor.

He is a son-in-law of Lyndon B. Johnson, the 36th President of the United States, through his marriage to his daughter, Lynda Bird Johnson. Their marriage in 1967 was the first in the White House since 1942.

Robb co-chaired the Iraq Intelligence Commission with former U.S. Attorney Laurence Silberman from February 2004 to December 2005. In 2006 he was appointed to serve on the President's Intelligence Advisory Board. Since 2001, Robb has been a member of the board of trustees of the MITRE Corporation.

== Early life and education ==
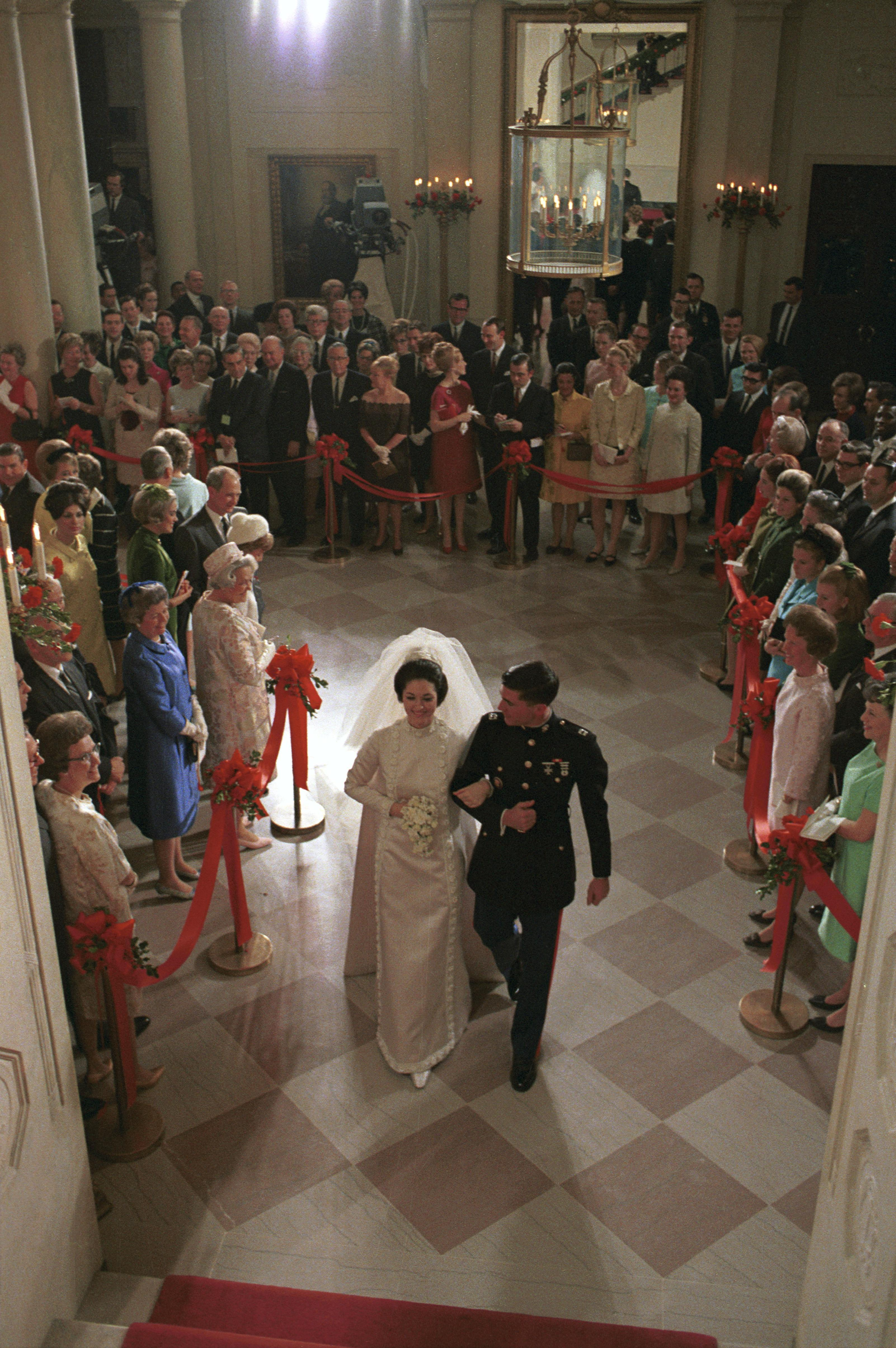
Robb and Lynda Bird Johnson's wedding at the White House, December 9, 1967

Charles Robb was born in Phoenix, Arizona, the son of Frances Howard (née Woolley) and James Spittal Robb. He grew up in the Mount Vernon area of Fairfax County, Virginia and graduated from Mount Vernon High School. He attended Cornell University before earning a Bachelor of Arts from the University of Wisconsin–Madison in 1961, where he was a member of Chi Phi fraternity.

A United States Marine Corps veteran and honor graduate of Quantico, Robb became a White House social aide. It was there that he met and eventually married Lynda Johnson, the daughter of then-U.S. President Lyndon B. Johnson in a service celebrated by the Right Reverend Gerald Nicholas McAllister. Robb went on to serve a tour of duty in Vietnam, where he commanded Company I of 3rd Battalion, 7th Marines in combat, and was awarded the Bronze Star and Vietnam Gallantry Cross with Star. Following his promotion to the rank of major, he was attached to the Logistics section (G-4), 1st Marine Division.

Robb earned a Juris Doctor from the University of Virginia Law School in 1973, and clerked for John D. Butzner, Jr., a judge on the Fourth Circuit Court of Appeals. Afterwards he resided in McLean, Virginia and entered private practice with Williams & Connolly. Robb became active in Virginia politics as a Democrat, and was a member of the Fairfax County Democratic Committee and the Virginia Democratic State Central Committee.

== Career ==
=== Lieutenant Governor of Virginia ===
In 1977, Robb won the election for lieutenant governor of Virginia, the only one of the three Democratic nominees for statewide office in Virginia to win that year, leaving him as the de facto head of a political party that had not won a governor's race in a dozen years. He served from 1978 to 1982.

=== Governorship ===
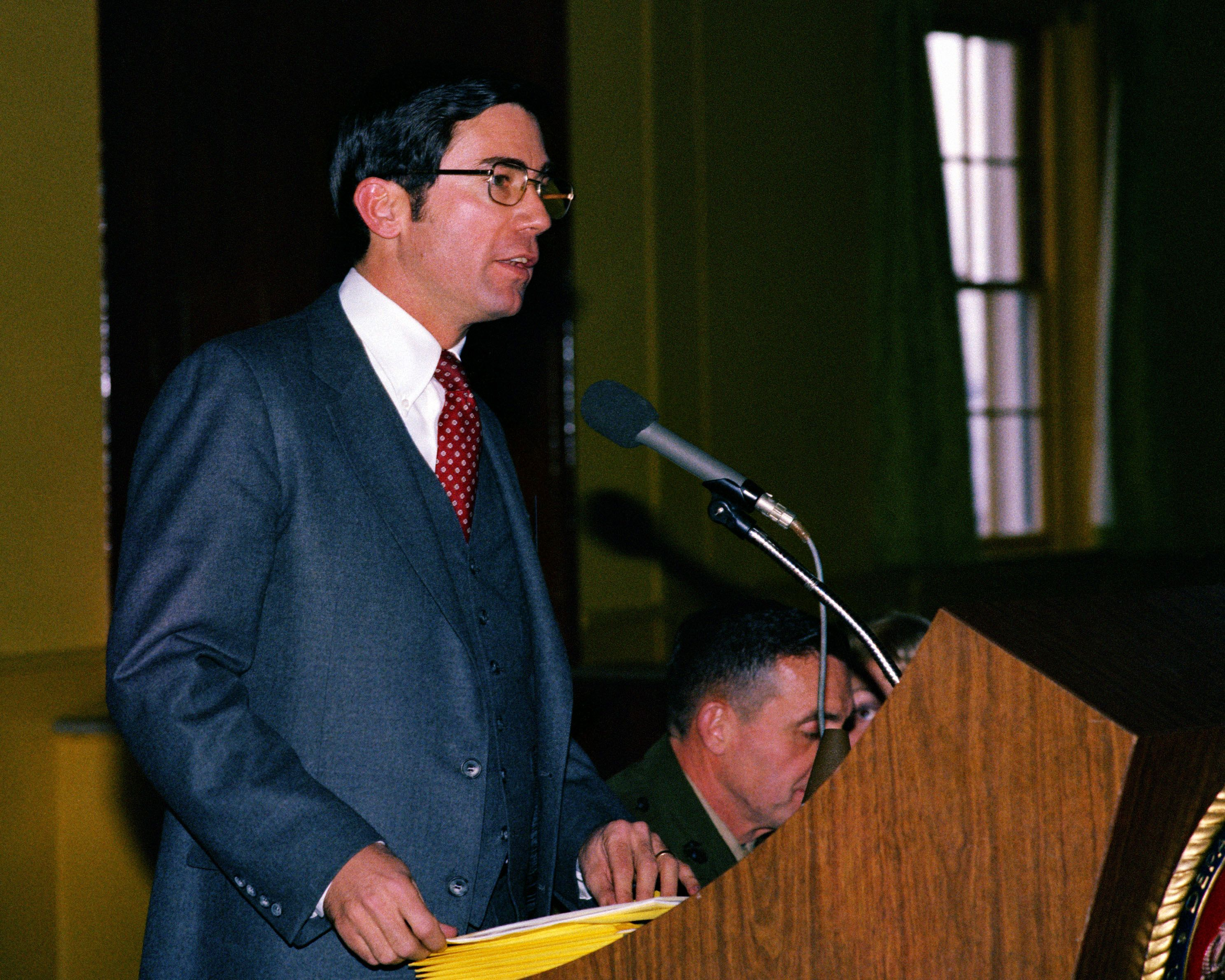
Lieutenant Governor Robb speaks to guests at a luncheon during the Virginia General Assembly's tour of Marine Corps Base Quantico on February 1, 1981.

Robb led the statewide Democratic ticket as its candidate for governor in 1981. The three Democrats running for governor, lieutenant governor and attorney general won by appealing to conservatives who were disenchanted with Robb's Republican opponent, J. Marshall Coleman. Virginia Democrats again won all three statewide offices in 1985, which was viewed as an endorsement of Robb's leadership while in office. As a campaigner, Robb was capable but reserved. During a time when political communication styles were beginning to favor sound bites, Robb was known for speaking in paragraphs about complex policy issues. He was also noteworthy among his contemporaries for raising substantial sums of campaign funds. During his term as governor, Robb founded the Democratic Governors Association in 1983.

Politically, Robb was a moderate and known generally as being fiscally conservative, pro-national security, and progressive on social issues. As governor, he balanced the state budget without raising taxes and dedicated an additional $1 billion for education. He appointed a record number of women and minorities to state positions, including the first African American to the state Supreme Court. He was the first Virginia governor in 25 years to use the death penalty. Robb was instrumental in creating the Super Tuesday primary that brought political power to the Southern states. He was also a co-founder in creating the Democratic Leadership Council. He was a strong vote-getter in Virginia in the 1980s and helped mold a more progressive Virginia Democratic Party than the one that had ruled the state for decades. For a time he was considered a presidential or vice-presidential prospect.

=== United States Senator ===
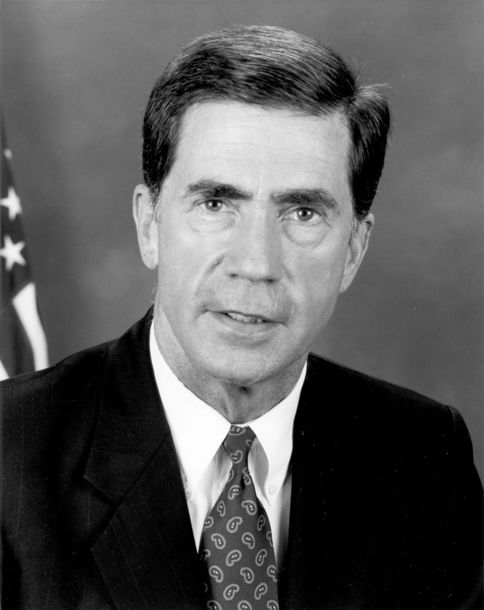
Robb during his tenure as a U.S. Senator

Robb later served as a Democratic member of the United States Senate from 1989 until 2001. Robb was elected in 1988, defeating Maurice Dawkins with 71% of the vote. Robb ranked annually as one of the most ideologically centrist senators and often acted as a bridge between Democratic and Republican members, as he preferred background deal-making to legislative limelight. His fellow Democrats removed him from the Budget Committee for advocating deeper cuts in federal spending.

In 1991, he was one of a handful of Democratic senators to support authorizing the use of force to expel Iraqi forces from Kuwait. The same year, he was one of eleven Democrats who voted to confirm the nomination of Clarence Thomas to the U.S. Supreme Court in a 52–48 vote, the narrowest margin of approval in more than a century. In 1992, he was chairman of the Democratic Senatorial Campaign Committee (DSCC), and during his term, the DSCC raised record amounts of funding to elect seven new Democrats to the Senate. The Democratic victory included the election of four new female senators and the re-election of a fifth in what was called The Year of the Woman.

Robb was more liberal on social issues. He voted for the Federal Assault Weapons Ban and against the execution of minors. He was opposed to a constitutional amendment to ban flag burning. In 1993, he supported Bill Clinton's proposal to adopt the don't ask, don't tell policy on homosexuals in the armed forces. Three years later, Robb was the only senator from a Southern state to oppose the Defense of Marriage Act. In stating his opposition to the bill, which his friends and supporters urged him to support, he said the following, "I feel very strongly that this legislation is wrong. Despite its name, the Defense of Marriage Act does not defend marriage against some imminent, crippling effect. Although we have made huge strides in the struggle against discrimination based on gender, race, and religion, it is more difficult to see beyond our differences regarding sexual orientation. The fact that our hearts don't speak in the same way is not cause or justification to discriminate." Some have speculated that his position on gay rights, along with his positions on other hot-button issues like abortion, alienated the generally conservative voters of Virginia and contributed to his eventual defeat.

Despite being outspent 4-1, Robb narrowly defeated former Iran-Contra figure Oliver North in 1994, a poor year nationally for Democrats. Senator John Warner refused to support North and instead backed third-party candidate and former Virginia Attorney General Marshall Coleman, whom Robb had defeated in the 1981 gubernatorial contest. The 1994 Senate campaign was documented in the 1996 film A Perfect Candidate and Brett Morgen's Ollie's Army (where Robb is seen being heckled on the campus of James Madison University). During the campaign, Robb won the endorsement of Reagan's Naval Secretary (and future Democratic senator) Jim Webb, and high-profile Republicans such as Elliot Richardson, William Ruckelshaus, and William Colby.

Following his re-election in 1994, Robb continued to promote fiscal responsibility and a strong national defense; he was the only Senate Democrat to vote for all items in the Republican Party's "Contract with America" when they reached the floor, including a Balanced Budget Amendment and a line item veto. He became the only senator to serve on all three national security committees: Armed Services, Foreign Relations, and Intelligence. After two terms in the Senate and 25 years in statewide politics, he was defeated in a close race in 2000 by Republican former governor, and former congressman George Allen, Robb was the only Democratic incumbent senator to be defeated in that election.

=== Scandals ===
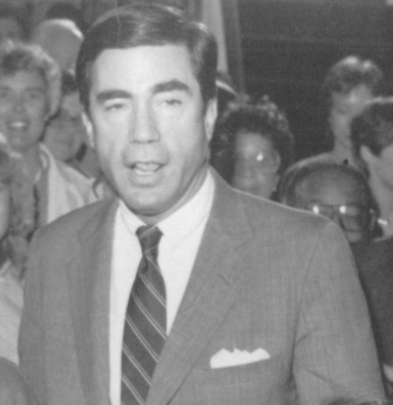
Robb as governor.

In 1991, former Miss Virginia USA Tai Collins claimed to have had an affair with Robb seven years earlier, although her allegations were never corroborated and she offered no proof of the affair to reporters. Robb denied having an affair with her, merely admitting to sharing a bottle of champagne and receiving a massage from her in his hotel room on one occasion. Soon after making the allegations, Collins earned an undisclosed amount for posing nude for Playboy magazine.

There were also rumors that during the time he was governor, Robb was present at parties in Virginia Beach where cocaine was used. These rumors were never proven, despite intense investigation by reporters and political operatives. He strongly denied this when the issue was raised during his 1988 campaign for the U.S. Senate. Robb so vehemently denied the cocaine allegation that he claimed to have never seen cocaine.

In 1991, three of Robb's aides resigned after pleading guilty to misdemeanors related to an illegally recorded cell phone conversation of Virginia Governor (and possible 1994 Senate primary opponent) Doug Wilder. The scandal of the phone conversation morphed into a federal grand jury investigation when it was alleged that Robb's staff and Robb himself conspired to distribute the contents of a mobile phone call taped by an "electronics buff." Robb and his staff claimed to be unaware of the fact that conversations on cell phones are protected by the same laws governing landlines. The grand jury concluded its eighteen-month investigation with a vote not to indict Robb. Relations between the Senator and Governor were described in the press as a "feud".

In 1994 Robb released a five-and-a-half-page letter admitting to some behavior "not appropriate for a married man". The letter did not go into details saying they "are purely private" between him and his wife and "not really anybody else's business." Robb denied using or witnessing the use of drugs. Robb also expressed regret for not acting quickly enough to end a conflict between his staff and Wilder's, and for not insisting that the tape of Wilder's conversation be destroyed immediately. Republican State Senator Mark L. Earley told reporters he thought Robb's letter was released to get ahead of a Washington Post story about allegations and memos from former Robb staffers. Bert Rohrer, a Robb spokesman, declared the charge as "nonsense" holding the process of crafting the letter had been months long and that he wanted to settle the issue before launching his re-election campaign.

=== Later career ===
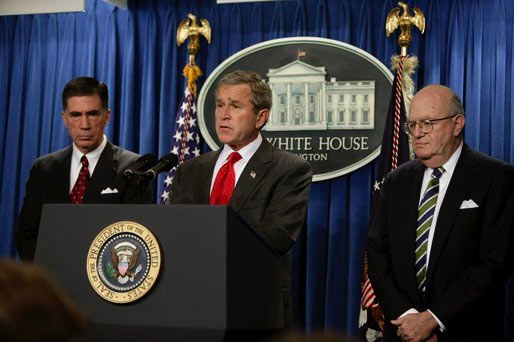
Robb with President George W. Bush and former U.S. Appeals Court Judge Laurence H. Silberman at a White House press conference announcing the formation of the Iraq Intelligence Commission which he would co-chair with Silberman, February 6, 2004.

Following his two terms in the Senate, Robb served on the board of visitors at the United States Naval Academy, and began teaching at George Mason University School of Law. On February 6, 2004, Robb was appointed co-chair of the Iraq Intelligence Commission, an independent panel tasked with investigating U.S. intelligence surrounding the United States' 2003 invasion of Iraq and Iraq's weapons of mass destruction. In 2006 he was appointed to serve on the U.S. President's Intelligence Advisory Board. He also served on the Iraq Study Group with former Secretary of State James A. Baker III. A New York Times article on October 9, 2006, credited Robb with being the only member of the group to venture outside the American controlled "Green Zone" on a recent trip to Baghdad.

Robb has served since 2001 as a member of the board of trustees of the MITRE Corporation. Robb serves as a co-leader of the National Security Project (NSP) at the Bipartisan Policy Center. He is also a former member of the Trilateral Commission and is a member of the Council on Foreign Relations, for which he served on the Independent Task Force on Pakistan and Afghanistan. In addition, he currently serves on the board of directors of the Committee for a Responsible Federal Budget. In April, 2021, the University of Virginia Press published his autobiography, titled In the Arena: A Memoir of Love, War, and Politics.

== Personal life ==
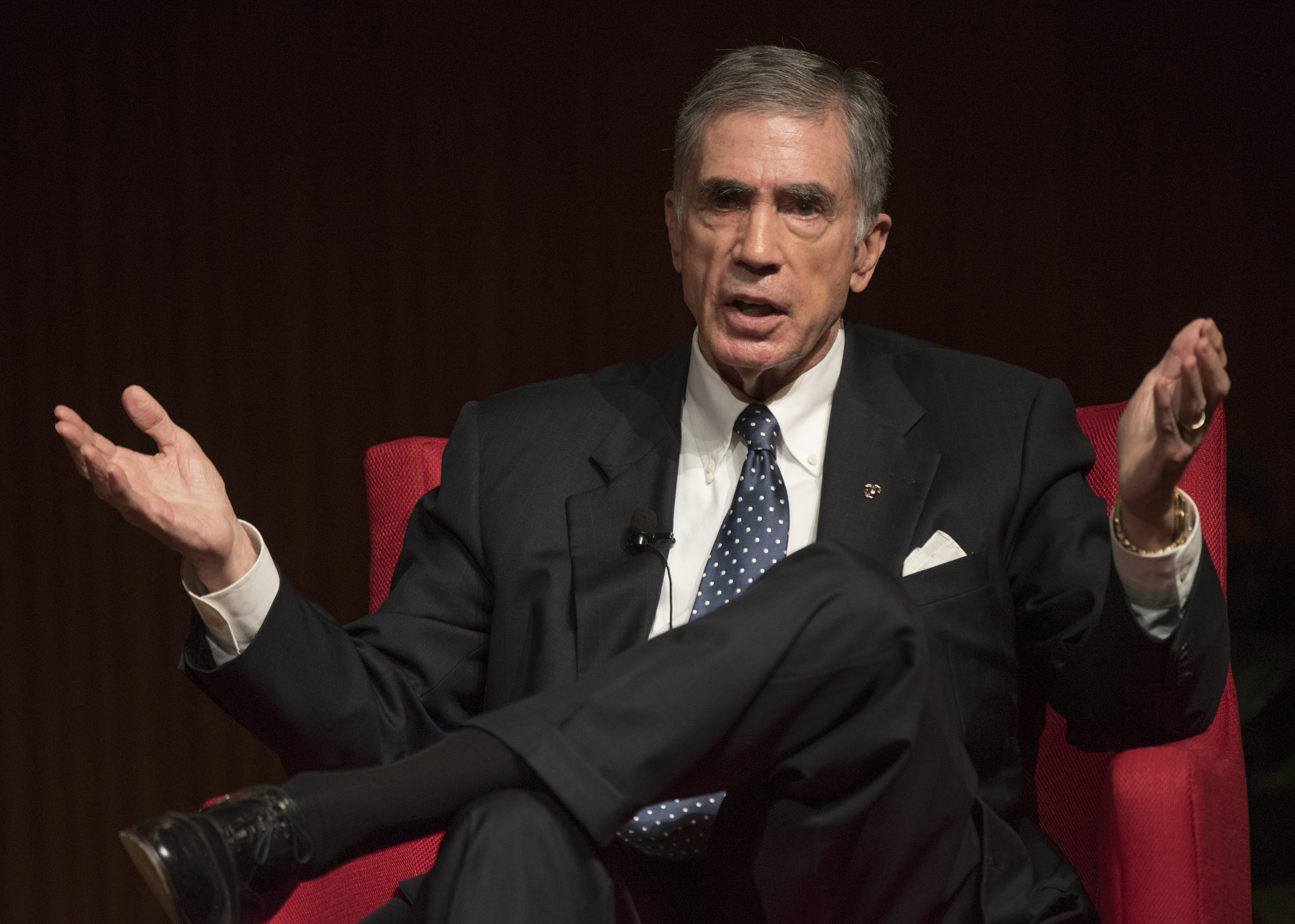
Robb at the LBJ Presidential Library in 2016

Robb married Lynda Bird Johnson, daughter of then President Lyndon B. Johnson and First Lady Lady Bird Johnson, in 1967. They have three daughters (Jennifer, Catherine and Lucinda) and five grandchildren and reside in McLean, Virginia.

On the evening of December 21, 2021, their home was consumed in flames and Senator and Mrs. Robb were hospitalized. Robb was downstairs when the fire broke out and attempted to climb the stairs to get to his wife and was confronted by a wall of flame. He was signaled to leave the building when his wife, who had been alerted to the fire by a smoke detector, incurred injuries when she took the car out of the garage and shined its headlights on the downstairs exit door. Robb was taken to a local hospital and treated for burns then released, his wife was hospitalized for smoke inhalation and second-degree burn injuries on her hand and elbow that were non-life-threatening. The blaze (which could be seen across the Potomac River into Washington D.C.) destroyed their books, photos, artwork, and historic memorabilia along with the home they had purchased in 1973 which had been valued at $3 million in 2020.

== See also ==
- List of federal political sex scandals in the United States
- Wallace Estill Sr. House

Political offices
Preceded by John N. Dalton	Lieutenant Governor of Virginia; 1978–1982	Succeeded by Dick Davis
Preceded by John N. Dalton	Governor of Virginia; 1982–1986	Succeeded by Gerald Baliles
Party political offices
Preceded by Henry Howell	Democratic nominee for Governor of Virginia; 1981	Succeeded by Gerald Baliles
Preceded by Scott Matheson	Chair of the Democratic Governors Association; 1983–1984	Succeeded by Bruce Babbitt
Preceded by Bill Clinton; Bob Graham; Tip O'Neill	Response to the State of the Union address 1986; Served alongside: Tom Daschle, Bill Gray, George Mitchell, Harriett Woods	Succeeded by Robert Byrd; Jim Wright
Preceded by Dick Gephardt	Chair of the Democratic Leadership Council; 1986–1988	Succeeded by Sam Nunn
Preceded by Dick Davis	Democratic nominee for U.S. Senator from Virginia (Class 1); 1988, 1994, 2000	Succeeded by Jim Webb
Preceded by John Breaux	Chair of the Democratic Senatorial Campaign Committee; 1991–1993	Succeeded by Bob Graham
U.S. Senate
Preceded by Paul Trible	United States Senator (Class 1) from Virginia; 1989–2001; Served alongside: John Warner	Succeeded by George Allen
U.S. order of precedence (ceremonial)
Preceded by Bob Smith as Former U.S. Senator	Order of precedence of the United States as Former U.S. Senator	Succeeded by Bob Corker as Former U.S. Senator
