= 1988 United States Senate election in Virginia =

- November 8, 1988
- Turnout: 49.8% (voting eligible)
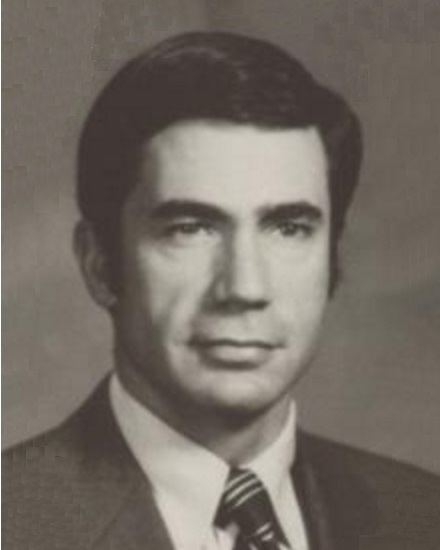

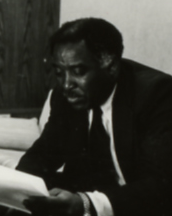
Nominee	Chuck Robb	Maurice A. Dawkins
Party	Democratic	Republican
Popular vote	1,474,086	593,652
Percentage	71.25%	28.69%
- Robb: 50–60% 60–70% 70–80% 80–90% >90% Dawkins: 50–60% 60–70% No votes
U.S. senator before election
Paul Trible
Republican
Elected U.S. Senator
Chuck Robb
Democratic

The 1988 United States Senate election in Virginia was held on November 8, 1988. Democratic former governor Chuck Robb succeeded Republican Senator Paul Trible, who opted not to run for re-election. As of 2026, this is the last time a Democratic Senatorial candidate won every county and independent city in Virginia.

== Background ==
Paul Trible announced that he would not seek reelection in September 1987, citing frustration with the legislative process and wanting to spend more time with his family.

== Republican nomination ==
Maurice Dawkins, a Baptist minister, defeated Andrew Wahlquist, a former assistant to U.S. Senator John Warner, on the first ballot of the Republican convention. Dawkins was the first black person nominated for a senatorial election in the state by a major party.

== Democratic nomination ==
Chuck Robb won the Democratic nomination without opposition at the convention held between June 3 to 4.

== General election ==
=== Candidates ===
- Maurice A. Dawkins, minister and black activist (Republican)
- Chuck Robb, former Governor of Virginia (Democratic)

=== Campaign ===
Robb's campaign raised $3.2 million and spent $2.8 million during the campaign. Dawkins spent $300,000 during the campaign which was less than every incumbent running with opposition in the concurrent U.S. House of Representatives elections.

=== Results ===
Robb placed first in all of Virginia's congressional districts. The third, fifth, and seventh congressional districts were the only districts that Dawkins received more than 30% of the vote. Robb received around 70% of the white vote while the overall composition of his voters were 78% white and 12% black compared to Dawkin's 94% white and 6% black. Robb is one of the few Democrats to have won a majority of the white vote after 1969.

Robb's victory was the best performance for a Democratic senatorial candidate in Virginia since A. Willis Robertson in 1960.

United States Senate election in Virginia, 1988
Party	Candidate	Votes	%	±%
Democratic	Chuck Robb	1,474,086	71.25%	+22.45%
Republican	Maurice A. Dawkins	593,652	28.69%	−22.51%
Write-ins		1,159	0.06%	
Majority		880,434	42.56%	+40.18%
Turnout		2,068,897		
Democratic gain from Republican		Swing		

== See also ==
- 1988 United States Senate elections

== Works cited ==
- Moreland, Laurence; Steed, Robert; Baker, Tod, eds. (1991). The 1988 Presidential Election in the South: Continuity Amidst Change in Southern Party Politics. Praeger Publishers. ISBN 0275931455.
