= List of United States political families (O) =

The following is an alphabetical list of political families in the United States whose last name begins with O.

== The O'Bannons ==
- Presley O'Bannon (1776–1850), member of the Kentucky Legislature. Ancestor of Lew O'Bannon.
  - Lew O'Bannon, candidate for Lieutenant Governor of Indiana 1924, candidate for U.S. Senate from Indiana 1932. Descendant of Presley O'Bannon.
    - Robert Presley O'Bannon, Indiana State Senator 1950–70. Son of Lew O'Bannon.
      - Frank O'Bannon (1930–2003), Indiana State Senator 1971–89, Lieutenant Governor 1989–97, Governor of Indiana 1997–2003, delegate to the Democratic National Convention 2000. Son of Robert O'Bannon.

== The O'Briens ==
- William S. O'Brien (1862–1948), Circuit Court Judge in West Virginia 1913–20, U.S. Representative from West Virginia 1927–29, West Virginia Secretary of State 1933–48. Father of D. Pitt O'Brien.
  - Daniel Pitt O'Brien, West Virginia Secretary of State. Son of William S. O'Brien.

== The Ochiltrees ==
- William Beck Ochiltree (1811–1867), Texas Republic Secretary of the Treasury 1844–45, Attorney General of the Texas Republic, delegate to the Texas Constitutional Convention 1845, Texas State Representative 1855, candidate for U.S. Representative from Texas 1859 1866, Delegate to the Confederate States Provisional Congress from Texas 1861–62. Father of Thomas Peck Ochiltree.
  - Thomas Peck Ochiltree (1837–1902), delegate to the Democratic National Convention 1860, U.S. Representative from Texas 1883–85. Son of William Beck Ochiltree.

== The Odells ==
- Benjamin Barker Odell Sr., delegate to the Republican National Convention 1884 Mayor of Newburgh, New York 1884–90. Father of Benjamin Barker Odell Jr.
  - Benjamin Barker Odell Jr. (1854–1926), U.S. Representative from New York 1895–99, Chairman of the New York Republican Party 1898–1900 1904–06, delegate to the Republican National Convention 1900 1904 1908 1924, Governor of New York 1901–04. Son of Benjamin Barker Odell Sr.

== The O'Dwyers ==
- William O'Dwyer (1890–1964), candidate for Mayor of New York City 1941, Mayor of New York City 1946–50, delegate to the Democratic National Convention 1948, U.S. Ambassador to Mexico 1950–52. Brother of Paul O'Dwyer.
- Paul O'Dwyer (1907–1998), candidate for U.S. Representative from New York 1948, delegate to the Democratic National Convention 1964, New York City Councilman, candidate for the Democratic nomination for Mayor of New York City 1965, candidate for U.S. Senate from New York 1968. Brother of William O'Dwyer.

== The Ogles of Pennsylvania ==
- Alexander Ogle (1766–1832), Pennsylvania State Representative 1803–04 1807–08 1811 1819–23, Clerk of Courts in Pennsylvania 1812–17, U.S. Representative from Pennsylvania 1817–19, Pennsylvania State Senator 1827–28. Father of Charles Ogle.
  - Charles Ogle (1798–1841), U.S. Representative from Pennsylvania 1837–41. Son of Alexander Ogle.
    - Andrew Jackson Ogle (1822–1852), Prothonotary of Somerset County, Pennsylvania; U.S. Representative from Pennsylvania 1849–51; U.S. Chargé d'Affaires to Denmark 1852. Grandson of Alexander Ogle.

== The Ogles of Maryland ==
- Samuel Ogle (1694–1752), Governor of Maryland Colony. Father of Benjamin Ogle.
  - Benjamin Ogle (1749–1809), Maryland Colony Councilman, Governor of Maryland 1798–1801. Son of Samuel Ogle.

== The Oglesbys ==
- Richard James Oglesby (1824–1899), candidate for U.S. Representative from Illinois 1858, Illinois State Senator, Governor of Illinois 1865–69 1873 1885–89, U.S. Senator from Illinois 1873–79. Cousin of Woodson R. Oglesby.
- Woodson R. Oglesby (1867–1955), New York Assemblyman 1906, delegate to the Democratic National Convention 1912, U.S. Representative from New York 1913–17. Cousin of Richard James Oglesby.
  - John G. Oglesby (1873–1938), Illinois State Representative 1915, Lieutenant Governor of Illinois 1909–13 1917–21, delegate to the Republican National Convention 1920 1924 1928 1932, candidate for Republican nomination for Governor of Illinois 1920. Son of Richard James Oglesby.

== The O'Haras ==
- Thomas O'Hara, Circuit Court Judge in Michigan 1888–93, candidate for Circuit Court Judge in Michigan 1899, candidate for U.S. Representative from Michigan 1902. Father of Barratt O'Hara.
  - Barratt O'Hara (1882–1969), Lieutenant Governor of Illinois 1913–17, candidate for U.S. Senate from Illinois 1915, candidate for Governor of Illinois 1920, candidate for U.S. Representative from Illinois 1938, U.S. Representative from Illinois 1949–51 1953–69. Son of Thomas O'Hara.

== The Olcotts ==
- J. Van Vechten Olcott (1856–1940), U.S. Representative from New York 1905–11, delegate to the Republican National Convention 1912. Brother of William M.K. Olcott.
- William M.K. Olcott (1862–1933), Alderman, New York County District Attorney 1896–97; delegate to the Republican National Convention 1904; delegate to the New York Constitutional Convention 1915. Brother of J. Van Vechten Olcott.

== The Oldfields ==
- William Allan Oldfield (1874–1928), U.S. Representative from Arkansas 1909–1928.
- Pearl Peden Oldfield (1876–1963), U.S. Representative from Arkansas 1929–1931. Wife of William Allan Oldfield.

== The O'Keefes ==
- Arthur J. O'Keefe (1876–1943), mayor of New Orleans, Louisiana 1926–29, grandfather of Michael H. O'Keefe
  - Michael H. O'Keefe (born 1932), Louisiana state senator (1960–1983), convicted felon, grandson of Arthur J. O'Keefe and uncle of Sean O'Keefe
    - Sean O'Keefe (born 1956), Administrator of NASA (2001–2005), former chancellor of Louisiana State University, nephew of Michael H. O'Keefe, great-grandson of Arthur J. O'Keefe"

== The Olins ==
- Gideon Olin (1743–1823), Vermont State Representative 1778 1780–93, Judge of Bennington County, Vermont Court 1781–98; Chief Judge of Bennington County, Vermont Court 1807–11; delegate to the Vermont Constitutional Convention 1791; Vermont Governor's Councilman 1793–98; U.S. Representative from Vermont 1803–07. Father of Abram B. Olin.
  - Abram B. Olin (1808–1879), delegate to the Republican National Convention 1856, U.S. Representative from New York 1857–63; Justice of the District of Columbia Supreme Court 1863–79. Son of Gideon Olin.
  - Henry Olin (1768–1837), Vermont State Representative 1799–1804 1806–15 1817–19 1822–24, delegate to the Vermont Constitutional Convention 1814 1822 1828, Judge of Addison County, Vermont 1801–24; Vermont Executive Councilman 1820–21; U.S. Representative from Vermont 1824–25; Lieutenant Governor of Vermont 1827–30. Nephew of Gideon Olin. Henry was not the nephew of Gideon - he was his 1st Cousin (once removed).

== The Olivers ==
- S. Addison Oliver (1833–1912), Iowa State Representative 1863–64, delegate to the Republican National Convention 1864, Iowa State Senator 1865–67, Circuit Court Judge in Iowa 1868–75, U.S. Representative from Iowa 1875–79. Father of Cyrus G. Oliver.
  - Cyrus G. Oliver (1864–1929), Iowa State Representative 1923–29. Son of S. Addison Oliver.

== The Olszewski ==
- John Olszewski, Member of the Baltimore County Council 1998–2014. Father of Johnny Olszewski.
  - Johnny Olszewski (born 1982), Member of the Maryland House of Delegates 2006–2015; 14th Executive of Baltimore County 2018–2025; U.S. Representative from Maryland 2025–present. Son of John Olszewski Sr.

== The O'Malleys and Currans ==
- Tom O'Malley (1925–2005), U.S. Attorney of District of Columbia 1957–62. Father of Martin O'Malley.
- J. Joseph Curran Jr. (born 1931), Maryland House Delegate 1959–63, Maryland State Senator 1963–83, Lieutenant Governor of Maryland 1983–87, Attorney General of Maryland 1987–2007. Father of Catherine Curran O'Malley.
  - Robert W. Curran (born 1950), member of the Baltimore City Council 1995–present. Son of J. Joseph Curran.
  - Martin O'Malley (born 1963), candidate for Maryland State Senate 1990, Baltimore, Maryland Councilman 1991–99; Mayor of Baltimore, Maryland 1999–2007; delegate to the Democratic National Convention 2000 and 2004, Governor of Maryland 2007–2015. Son of Tom O'Malley.
  - Catherine Curran O'Malley (born 1962), Maryland State Judge 2001–2021. Wife of Martin O'Malley.
- Gerald Curran (1939–2013), Maryland House Delegate 1967–98. First cousin of J. Joseph Curran.

== The O'Malleys of Wisconsin ==
- Thomas J. O'Malley (1868–1936), Lieutenant Governor of Wisconsin 1933–36. Father of Thomas O'Malley.
  - Thomas O'Malley (1903–1979), delegate to the Democratic National Convention 1932, U.S. Representative from Wisconsin 1933–39. Son of Thomas J. O'Malley.

== The O'Neals of Alabama ==
- Edward A. O'Neal (1818–1890), delegate to the Alabama Constitutional Convention 1875, Governor of Alabama 1882–86. Father of Emmet O'Neal.
  - Emmet O'Neal (1853–1922), Governor of Alabama 1911–15, delegate to the Democratic National Convention 1912. Son of Edward A. O'Neal.

== The O'Nealls of South Carolina and Indiana ==
- John Belton O'Neall (1793-1863), South Carolina State Representative 1816–28, Judge of the South Carolina Court of Appeals 1830. First cousin of Abijah O'Neall and Thomas H. O'Neall.
- Abijah O'Neall (1798-1874), Indiana State Representative 1839–40, candidate for Indiana State Senate 1849. First cousin of John Belton O'Neall.
- Thomas H. O'Neall (1813-1889), Indiana State Representative 1849–51. First cousin of John Belton O'Neall.
- John F. O'Neall (1804-1865), Indiana State Representative 1841–44, candidate for Indiana State Senate 1844 1847. Cousin of Abijah O'Neall and Thomas H. O'Neall.
  - John Kelly O'Neall, Indiana State Representative 1881. Son of Abijah O'Neall.
  - John H. O'Neall (1838–1907), Indiana State Representative 1867, U.S. Representative from Indiana 1887–91, delegate to the Democratic National Convention 1896. Nephew of John F. O'Neall.
    - Bruce Charles Savage (1906–1993), candidate for the Republican nomination for U.S. Representative from Indiana 1946. Great-great-grandson-in-law of Abijah O'Neall.

== The O'Neills of Massachusetts ==
- Thomas P. O'Neill Jr. (1912–1994), candidate for City Council of Cambridge, Massachusetts 1935, Massachusetts State Representative 1936–52, U.S. Representative from Massachusetts 1953–87, Speaker of the U.S. House of Representatives 1977–87. Father of Thomas P. O'Neil III.
  - Thomas P. O'Neill III (born 1945), Massachusetts State Representative, Lieutenant Governor of Massachusetts 1975–80, delegate to the Democratic National Convention 1980. Son of Thomas P. O'Neill Jr.

== The O'Neills of Ohio ==
- Charles T. O'Neill, Justice of the Peace in Ohio. Father of C. William O'Neill.
  - C. William O'Neill (1916–1978), Ohio State Representative 1939–50, Attorney General of Ohio 1951–57, delegate to the Republican National Convention 1952 1956, Governor of Ohio 1957–59, Justice of the Ohio Supreme Court 1960–70, Chief Justice of the Ohio 1970–78. Son of Charles T. O'Neill.

== The Orrs ==
- James L. Orr (1822–1873), South Carolina State Representative 1844–48, U.S. Representative from South Carolina 1849–59, Speaker of the U.S. House of Representative 1857–59, Delegate to the Confederate States Provisional Congress from South Carolina 1862, Confederate State Senator from South Carolina 1862–65, delegate to the South Carolina Constitutional Convention 1865, Governor of South Carolina 1865–68, South Carolina State Court Judge 1868–70, U.S. Minister to Russia 1872–73. Brother of Jehu Amaziah Orr.
- Jehu Amaziah Orr (1828–1921), member of the Mississippi Legislature 1852, Delegate to the Confederate State Provisional Congress from Mississippi 1861–62, Confederate State Representative from Mississippi 1864–65, Mississippi State Court Judge 1870–76. Brother of James L. Orr.

== The Osbornes ==
- Edwin S. Osborne (1839–1900), U.S. Representative from Pennsylvania 1895–1901, delegate to the Republican National Convention 1888. Father of John Ball Osborne.
  - John Ball Osborne, U.S. Consul in Ghent, Belgium 1889–94; U.S. Consul in Le Havre, France 1912–19; U.S. Consul General in Le Havre, France 1919–20; U.S. Consul General in Christiania, Norway 1920–21; U.S. Consul General in Genoa, Italy 1921–26; U.S. Consul General in Stockholm, Sweden 1927–29; U.S. Consul General in Budapest, Hungary 1932. Son of Edwin S. Osborne.

== The O'Scannlains ==
- Diarmuid O'Scannlain (born 1937), candidate for U.S. Representative 1974, Judge of the United States Court of Appeals for the Ninth Circuit 1986–2016.
  - Kate S. O'Scannlain (born 1977), United States Solicitor of Labor 2017–present. Daughter of Diarmuid O'Scannlain.

== The Oteros ==
- Miguel Antonio Otero (1829–1882), Attorney General of New Mexico Territory 1854–56, U.S. Congressional Delegate from New Mexico Territory 1856–61, delegate to the Democratic National Convention 1860, Secretary of New Mexico Territory 1861–62, acting Governor of New Mexico Territory 1861–62, candidate for U.S. Congressional Delegate from New Mexico Territory 1880. Father of Miguel Antonio Otero.
  - Miguel Antonio Otero (1859–1944), Clerk of Las Vegas, New Mexico; Probate Clerk in New Mexico Territory; Clerk of San Miguel County, New Mexico; Governor of New Mexico Territory 1897–1906; Treasurer of New Mexico Territory 1909–11; candidate for Republican nomination for Governor of New Mexico 1912; U.S. Marshal of the Panama Canal 1917–21. Son of Miguel Antonio Otero.
  - Mariano S. Otero (1844–1904), Probate Judge of Bernalillo County, New Mexico 1871–79; U.S Congressional Delegate from New Mexico Territory 1879–81; Commissioner of Bernalillo County, New Mexico 1884–86; candidate for U.S. Congressional Delegate from New Mexico Territory 1888 1890. Nephew of Miguel Antonio Otero.
    - Miguel Antonio Otero Jr. (1892–1977), District Court Judge in Santa Fe, New Mexico. Son of Miguel Antonio Otero.

NOTE: Miguel Antonio Otero was also son-in-law of Minnesota Supreme Court Justice Lafayette Emmett.

== The Otises ==
See Otis family

== The Ottingers ==
- Nathan Ottinger, candidate for Justice of the New York Supreme Court 1911. Brother of Albert Ottinger.
- Albert Ottinger (1878–1938), candidate for U.S. Representative from New York 1914, New York State Senator 1917–18, Attorney General of New York 1925–28, delegate to the Republican National Convention 1928 1932, candidate for Governor of New York 1928. Brother of Nathan Ottinger.
  - Richard Ottinger (1929–2026), U.S. Representative from New York 1965–71 1975–85, candidate for U.S. Representative from New York 1972, candidate for U.S. Senate from New York 1970, delegate to the Republican National Convention 1980. Son of Albert Ottinger.

== The Outlaws ==
- George Outlaw, member of the North Carolina House of Commons 1796–97, North Carolina State Senator 1802–06 1808–10 1814 1817 1821–22, U.S. Representative from North Carolina 1825. Cousin of David Outlaw.
- David Outlaw (1806–1868), North Carolina State Representative 1831–34 1854 1858, delegate to the North Carolina Constitutional Convention 1835, Solicitor in North Carolina 1836–44, U.S. Representative from North Carolina 1847–53. Cousin of George Outlaw.

== The Obenshains ==
- Richard D. Obenshain (1935–1978), chair of the Republican Party of Virginia and Republican nominee in the 1978 United States Senate election in Virginia
  - Mark Obenshain (1962—), member of the Virginia Senate (2004-present) and Republican nominee in the 2013 Virginia Attorney General election
  - Kate Obenshain (1968—), chair of the Republican Party of Virginia (2003–2006)
- Chris Obenshain, member of the Virginia House of Delegates (2024-present); cousin of Mark and Kate.
