= Obenshain =

Obenshain is a surname. Notable people with the surname include:

- Chris Obenshain, American politician from Virginia
- Kate Obenshain (born 1968), American journalist and politician, sister of Mark and daughter of Richard
- Mark Obenshain (born 1962), American politician and attorney
- Richard D. Obenshain (1935–1978), American politician and attorney
