= Kathleen Griffin =

Kathleen Griffin may refer to:

- Kathleen Griffin (camogie), former camogie player
- Kathy Griffin (Kathleen Mary Griffin, born 1960), American actress, comedian and television personality

== See also ==
- Kate Griffin (disambiguation)
