= 2025 Chesapeake, Virginia elections =

2025 election in Virginia, U.S.

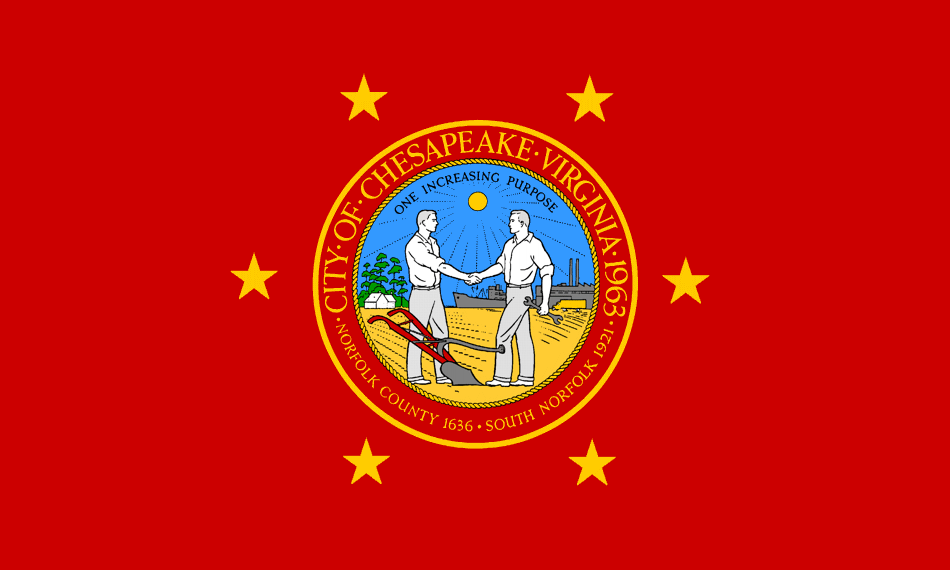
- November 4, 2025

A general election was held in Chesapeake, Virginia to elect various county-level officials on November 4, 2025. Primary elections took place on June 17.

== Sheriff ==
=== Republican primary ===
==== Candidates ====
===== Nominee =====
- Wallace Chadwick, police lieutenant

===== Eliminated in primary =====
- Dave Rosado, incumbent sheriff

==== Campaign ====
Immigration and cooperation with the United States Immigration and Customs Enforcement (ICE) department, was considered a focus of the campaign.

==== Results ====
Republican primary
Party	Candidate	Votes	%
Republican	Wallace Chadwick III	7,300	58.20
Republican	Dave Rosado (incumbent)	5,242	41.80
Total votes		12,542	100.00

=== Third-party or independent candidates ===
==== Write-in candidates ====
- Dave Rosado, incumbent sheriff (eliminated in Republican primary)

=== General election ===
==== Results ====
2025 Chesapeake Sheriff election
Party	Candidate	Votes	%
Republican	Wallace Chadwick III	52,929	60.33
Write-in		34,802	39.67
Total votes		87,731	100.00
Republican hold			

== Commonwealth's Attorney ==
=== Democratic primary ===
==== Candidates ====
===== Nominee =====
- Matthew Hamel, incumbent Commonwealth's Attorney (switched parties in 2024)

=== Republican primary ===
==== Candidates ====
===== Nominee =====
- David Mick, prosecutor

=== General election ===
==== Results ====
2025 Chesapeake Commonwealth's Attorney election
Party	Candidate	Votes	%
Democratic	Matthew Hamel (incumbent)	52,742	57.07
Republican	David Mick	39,146	42.36
Write-in		522	0.56
Total votes		92,410	100.00
Democratic hold			

== Commissioner of Revenue ==
=== Republican primary ===
==== Candidates ====
===== Nominee =====
- Victoria Proffitt, incumbent commissioner

=== Democratic primary ===
==== Candidates ====
===== Nominee =====
- Jennifer Naperala, candidate for city council in 2024

=== General election ===
==== Results ====
2025 Chesapeake Commissioner of Revenue election
Party	Candidate	Votes	%
Republican	Victoria Proffitt (incumbent)	46,813	50.75
Democratic	Jennifer Naperala	45,040	48.83
Write-in		383	0.42
Total votes		92,236	100.00
Republican hold			

== Treasurer ==
=== Republican primary ===
==== Nominee ====
- Wendy Roenker, legal counsel at the treasurer's office

=== Democratic primary ===
==== Nominee ====
- Corrie Kring, former City of Chesapeake Treasurer office employee

=== General election ===
==== Results ====
2025 Chesapeake Treasurer election
Party	Candidate	Votes	%
Democratic	Corrie A. Kring	49,037	53.33
Republican	Wendy Roenker	42,496	46.21
Write-in		425	0.44
Total votes		91,958	100.00
Democratic gain from Republican			
