= Ed Gillespie =

American political strategist (born 1961)

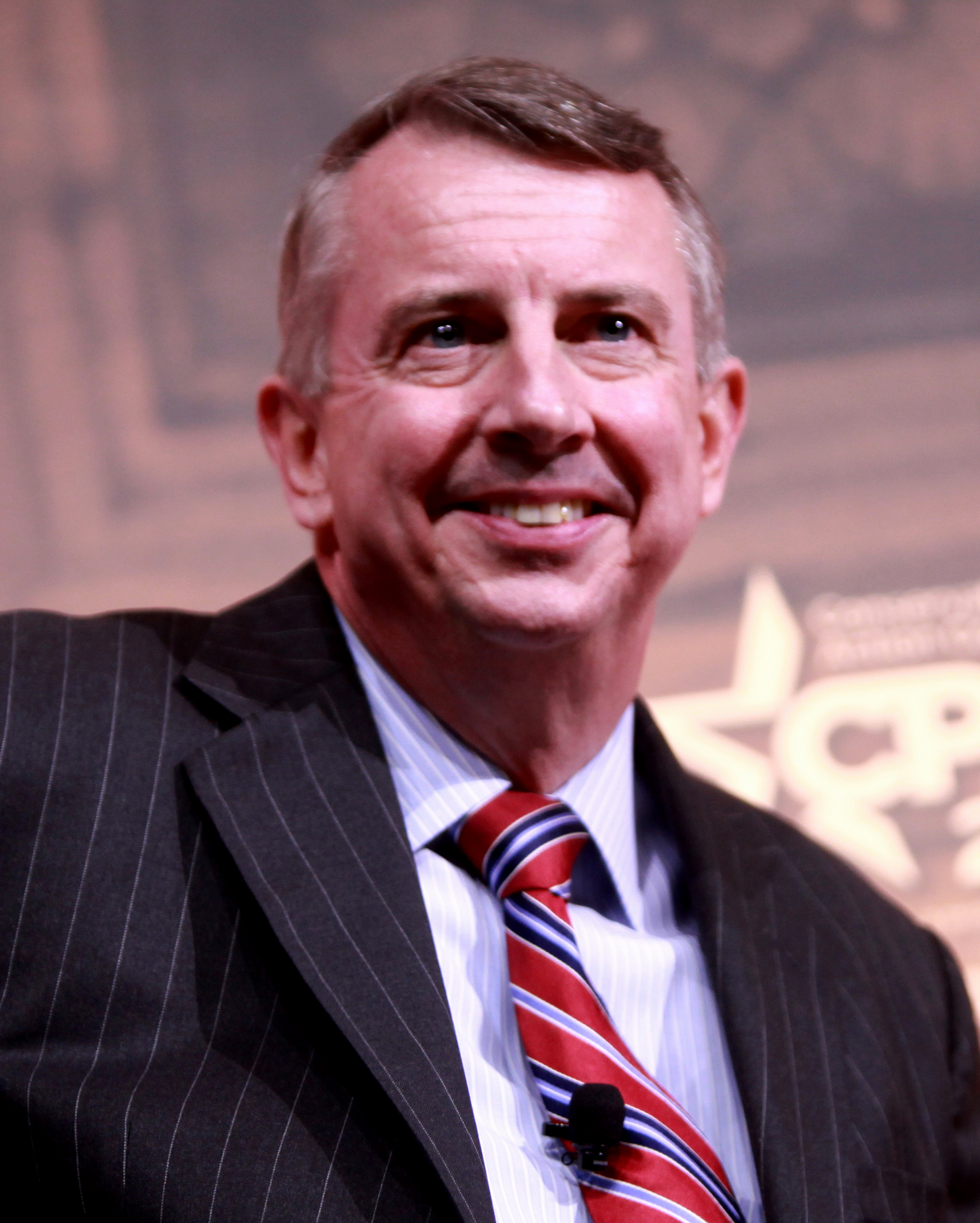
- Gillespie in 2014

Counselor to the President
- In office July 5, 2007 – January 20, 2009
- President: George W. Bush
- Preceded by: Dan Bartlett
- Succeeded by: Pete Rouse (2011)

Chair of the Virginia Republican Party
- In office December 4, 2006 – June 13, 2007
- Preceded by: Kate Obenshain
- Succeeded by: John Hager

61st Chair of the Republican National Committee
- In office July 25, 2003 – January 20, 2005
- Preceded by: Marc Racicot
- Succeeded by: Ken Mehlman

Personal details
- Born: Edward Walter Gillespie; August 1, 1961 (age 65) Mount Holly, New Jersey, U.S.
- Party: Republican (1984–present)
- Other political affiliations: Democratic (before 1984)
- Spouse: Cathy Gillespie
- Children: 3
- Education: Catholic University (BA)

Edward Walter Gillespie (born August 1, 1961) is an American politician, strategist, and lobbyist who served as the 61st chair of the Republican National Committee from 2003 to 2005 and was counselor to the president from 2007 to 2009 during the presidency of George W. Bush. In 2012, Gillespie was a senior member of the Mitt Romney presidential campaign.

Gillespie founded the bipartisan lobbying firm Quinn Gillespie & Associates with Jack Quinn, and founded Ed Gillespie Strategies.

Gillespie ran in the 2014 United States Senate election in Virginia. Gillespie narrowly lost to incumbent Mark Warner by a margin of 0.8%. Gillespie ran for governor of Virginia in the 2017 election. After winning the Republican primary, he was defeated in the general election by Democratic nominee Ralph Northam; Gillespie received 1.17 million votes (45%) to Northam's 1.40 million (54%) in the election.

In 2020, Gillespie was hired by AT&T to serve as senior executive vice president for external and legislative affairs. Previously, he served as co-chairman of Sard Verbinnen & Co.'s public affairs practice.

== Early life ==
Edward Walter Gillespie was born on August 1, 1961, in Mount Holly, New Jersey, and raised in the Browns Mills section of Pemberton Township, New Jersey. He is the son of Conny (Carroll) and Sean (later John) Patrick Gillespie, an immigrant from Ireland who grew up in North Philadelphia. His parents owned a small grocery store in New Jersey, and Gillespie worked there after school.

Gillespie is a graduate of The Catholic University of America in Washington, D.C., and Pemberton Township High School. While at CUA he began his career on Capitol Hill as a U.S. Senate parking lot attendant. One of his co-workers there was an intern for Representative Andy Ireland of Florida, and through him, Gillespie got the same job after he graduated from college.

== Political career ==
Gillespie, raised in a Democratic family, began his political career as intern for Andy Ireland, at the time a Democrat from Florida. In 1984, Ireland joined the Republican party with Gillespie following, saying, "I liked President Reagan's approach to governing and it just made sense to me." In his book, Winning Right, Gillespie described himself as someone who "all but had 'Democrat' stamped on his birth certificate," but had become increasingly uncomfortable with the leftward tilt of the national party and believed it wasn't taking the threat of Communism seriously. As he saw it, he and Ireland were classic Reagan Democrats who became Republicans–"a southern conservative and a young northeastern ethnic Catholic who no longer felt comfortable in the party of their heritage."

Gillespie worked as telephone solicitor for the Republican National Committee in 1985, and later worked for a decade as a top aide to former House Majority Leader Dick Armey (R-TX), and was a principal drafter of the GOP's 1994 "Contract With America."

In 1996, Gillespie served as communications director for the RNC. In 1999, Gillespie worked as the Press Secretary for the Presidential campaign of John Kasich until his withdrawal from the race and endorsement of George W. Bush. In 2000, Gillespie served as senior communications advisor for the presidential campaign of Bush, organizing the party convention program in Philadelphia for Bush's nomination and Bush's inauguration ceremony. He played an aggressive role as spokesman for the Bush campaign during the vote recount in Florida. In 2002, he was a strategist for Elizabeth Dole's 2002 Senate campaign.

=== Lobbyist ===
In 1997, Gillespie joined the lobbying firm BGR Group (Barbour, Griffith & Rogers), and advised Senate Republicans during the impeachment of Bill Clinton.

In 2000, Gillespie founded the lobbying firm Quinn Gillespie & Associates with Jack Quinn, and within a year had an income of $8.5 million and was 11th on Fortune's list of the most powerful lobbying firms in the US. One of the firm's clients was Enron, which paid it $1,225,000, including $700,000 to lobby the Department of Energy and the Executive Office of the President to resist efforts to re-regulate the western electricity market during the California Electricity Crisis. Gillespie has said that he was unaware of Enron's deceptive accounting practices. By the end of 2002, Quinn Gillespie & Associates had received $27.4 million in lobbying fees.

In 2007, Quinn Gillespie & Associates represented more than 100 clients. The firm lobbied on behalf of AT&T, Bank of America, and Microsoft in the years 2001–2007, earning more than $3.2 million. In 2016, the firm reported $17.2 million in revenue from federal lobbying. The firm pitched to potential clients that Gillespie, due to his involvement with the White House and association with individuals in power, could leverage those relationships to benefit clients.

In 2016, Gillespie lobbied on behalf of the health insurance company Anthem, as the nation's second-largest insurance firm tried to merge with third-largest insurance firm Cigna. A federal judge blocked the mergers, citing insurance regulators who said the merger would raise costs and reduce competition in the health insurance market.

Gillespie shut down his lobbying firm Ed Gillespie Strategies shortly before launching his campaign for governor in January 2017.

The conservative government watchdog Judicial Watch said that Gillespie's ties to corporations may pose a conflict of interest for him as governor, and that this is a "nonpartisan concern". Gillespie's former clients Anthem, AT&T, Microsoft, and Bank of America have ongoing interests in the state of Virginia, and these corporations or their top executives have donated to the Gillespie 2017 campaign. Gillespie voluntarily released the list of his clients, disclosing more than is required by state law.

=== Chairmanships of the RNC and Republican Party of Virginia ===
In 2003, Gillespie was selected as chairman of the RNC, serving in that role through the 2004 elections that saw President Bush win re-election and Republicans retain control of the House and Senate. He did not give up his stake in the lobbying firm when he took that job, which caused controversy. During the campaign, he was regularly referred to as "President Bush's pit bull."

After his chairmanship ended, in 2005 Bush appointed Gillespie to lead the process to nominate a successor to Sandra Day O'Connor on the Supreme Court; that process led to the selection and confirmation of Samuel Alito. Gillespie also worked alongside former senator Fred Thompson the same year as one of two confirmation "sherpas" to John Roberts during his nomination process. Sherpas are advisors tasked with guiding a Supreme Court nominee through the rigors of the confirmation process. Gillespie's book Winning Right was released in September 2006.

Gillespie served as chairman of the Republican Party of Virginia from December 2006 to June 2007. In the 2006 Virginia Senate elections he served as spokesman for defeated Virginia Senator George Allen. He had been tapped by Allen as a political adviser for a possible presidential run in 2008 before that loss. In February 2009, Virginia Attorney General Bob McDonnell announced that Gillespie would serve as general chairman of his campaign for governor. Gillespie has served as an adviser to American Crossroads.

=== White House counselor ===
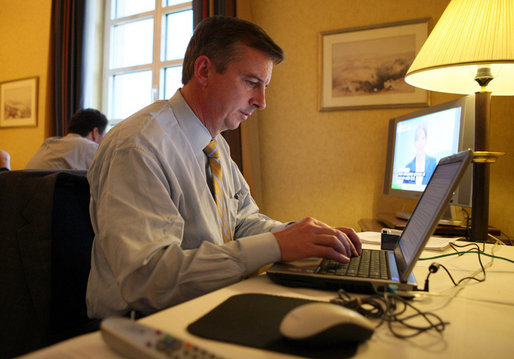
Gillespie working as White House Counselor, 2008

In late June 2007, President Bush brought Gillespie into the White House on a full-time basis, to replace the departing counselor to the president Dan Bartlett with the mandate to help raise Bush's flagging popularity ratings. When Karl Rove also departed in August, The Washington Post described Gillespie as stepping up to do part of Rove's job in the White House. A later Post article described Gillespie's role orchestrating a PR unit dedicated to "selling the surge to American voters and the media."

Later in 2007, the Washington Post reported that Gillespie had taken a substantial pay cut to become Bush's counselor. "A disclosure form shows he made nearly $1.3 million in salary and bonus in the previous 18 months at his consulting and public affairs firm . . . His annual government salary is $168,000. The form, obtained by the Associated Press, reports that Gillespie . . . a former Capitol Hill aide who co-founded his lobbying shop in 2000 . . . has accumulated a fortune estimated to be between $7.86 million and $19.4 million."

=== Post-White House ===
In 2009, Gillespie was the chairman of Bob McDonnell's successful campaign for governor of Virginia.

In January 2010, Gillespie was announced in as the national chairman of the Republican State Leadership Committee (RSLC), which helps elect state attorneys general, lieutenant governors, secretaries of state and state house and senate candidates. After Gillespie was announced chairman the RSLC is reported to have laundered $1.5 million from the Poarch Band of Creek Indians to Alabama Speaker Mike Hubbard and a group associated with Jack Abramoff. From January 2010 to January 2014 the RSLC paid Gilespie $654,000. Gillespie was not legally listed as the RSLC chairman until February 2011, when the organization filed updated documents with the IRS.

In 2010, together with Republican strategist Karl Rove, Ed Gillespie helped get the Super Pac American Crossroads "off the ground." The organization's goal was to supplement campaign spending for Republicans, independently of the Republican party. '"Obama had $1.1 billion in 2008," says Gillespie.."John McCain and his supporters spent $634 million. That's a sizable gap." American Crossroads, he boasts, will be the place where the real money goes to "play."'

In April 2012, Gillespie became a senior advisor to Mitt Romney's 2012 presidential campaign.

=== 2014 U.S. Senate run ===
In December 2013, Gillespie told Politico that he was considering a first-time political run in 2014 against Mark Warner, a popular Democratic incumbent U.S. Senator in Virginia.

In January 2014, he officially launched his candidacy. He named Chris Leavitt, campaign manager of Mark Obenshain's 2013 run for Virginia Attorney general, his campaign manager. On June 7, 2014, he became the Republican nominee after receiving about 60% of the vote at the state party convention.

Although Warner had been consistently leading Gillespie by double-digit margins in polls before October, Gillespie nearly upset Warner on Election Day, losing by a margin of just 0.8% and 17,723 votes, with 37% turnout. Gillespie conceded the race on November 7, 2014.

=== 2017 gubernatorial run ===
Speculation began immediately after Gillespie's narrow 2014 loss that he would run for Governor of Virginia in 2017. In October 2015, Gillespie confirmed reports that he was preparing to run for governor in 2017. He officially declared his candidacy in November 2016. Gillespie was considered the favorite to win the Republican nomination.

On June 13, 2017, Gillespie narrowly defeated his primary opponent Corey Stewart to win the Republican nomination for governor and was set to face incumbent lieutenant governor Ralph Northam, the Democratic nominee, in the November general election.

In the 2017 gubernatorial campaign up to June 2017, Gillespie ran as an establishment Republican and focused on economic issues rather than social issues. According to The New York Times in July 2017, Gillespie "sought to strike a delicate balance when pressed about Mr. Trump, who is highly unpopular here. He refused to say Mr. Trump's name, but warned that Mr. Northam, a Democrat, risked hurting Virginia's economy—which relies greatly on the federal government—by attacking the president so fiercely." According to CNN, even though Gillespie has been endorsed by President Donald Trump, the "endorsement isn't mentioned anywhere on Gillespie's campaign website or his social media pages. Gillespie doesn't discuss Trump unless he's prompted to do so. He doesn't criticize the President, but he also doesn't make an effort to embrace him, either." In October 2017, Vice President Mike Pence held a joint rally with Gillespie. According to The New York Times, the Gillespie campaign preferred Pence's involvement in the race over Trump's.

In August 2017, The Washington Post reported that Gillespie hired Jack Morgan, an operative in the Trump 2016 campaign for president. Morgan has made controversial statements, such as saying that the country is on the brink of civil war and that communists are behind efforts to remove confederate monuments. Morgan had earlier in 2017 called Gillespie a "lobbyist" and said that it would be a "disaster" to elect him governor. According to The New York Times, even though the Gillespie campaign distanced itself from Trump the person, it sought to motivate voters with the same "culturally and racially tinged appeals" of the Trump 2016 campaign. Most of Gillespie's ad spending has gone towards commercials on confederate monuments and illegal immigration. In October 2017, former president Barack Obama took what The Washington Post described as "the unusual step" of criticizing Gillespie over his use of ads on Latino gang violence which he said sowed fear and were "as cynical as politics gets".

After the Unite the Right rally in Charlottesville, Gillespie condemned the far-right protestors, saying, "[We] reject the people who came in, largely from outside our Commonwealth, and brought their hate, their white supremacism, their neo-Nazism with them." After Donald Trump's controversial comment that there were "fine people on both sides," Gillespie said there was "no moral comparison between white supremacists and 'those that show up to condemn them for espousing that kind of hate-filled speech.'

Gillespie criticized Northam for casting the deciding "no" vote to stop a Republican bill which would have banned sanctuary cities in Virginia. During the campaign, Gillespie and Trump accused Northam of being responsible for the increased activities of the MS-13 gangs and of being "in favor of sanctuary cities that let dangerous illegal immigrants back on the streets" and that this contributed to the surge in MS-13 violence; a notion that FactCheck.org found to be "misleading". The Washington Post and CNN noted that there are no actual sanctuary cities in Virginia and The Washington Post editorial board condemned the ads in an editorial called "Gillespie's ads are poisonous to Virginia and the nation". Gillespie himself acknowledged that Virginia did not have sanctuary cities. The Washington Post furthermore noted that there is no evidence that sanctuary cities increase crime or gang activity.

In October, the Latino Victory Fund, which supported Northam, released an ad in which a pickup truck, adorned with a Gillespie bumper sticker, a "Don't tread on me" license plate, and a Confederate flag, chases down minority children and corners them in an alley—one of the children in the ad then wakes up, revealing the scene to have been a nightmare. Although Northam and his campaign were not involved with the ad, Northam initially defended it, saying Gillespie's own ads "have promoted fearmongering, hatred, bigotry, racial divisiveness," and adding, "I mean, it's upset a lot of communities, and they have the right to express their views as well." The ad was pulled the following day in the hours after a terrorist attack in New York City, in which a man killed several people by running them over with a truck. Northam then distanced himself from the ad, re-emphasizing that it was not released by his campaign and saying that it is not one that he would have chosen to run. A spokesman for the campaign has said that the Latino Victory Fund's decision to pull the ad was "appropriate and the right thing to do." FOX 5 DC reported that the Northam campaign had accepted $62,000 as an in-kind media contribution from the Latino Victory Fund.

According to the Virginia Public Access Project, as of November 5, Northam had raised $33.8 million to Gillespie's $24.5 million.

In October 2017, National Review posted an analysis of the Gillespie campaign as an important example of whether and how mainstream Republican politics, represented by Gillespie, can produce victories in a purple state in the "era of Trumpism", and said that the outcome would effect Republican strategies in future races.

Gillespie received 1.17 million votes (45%) to Northam's 1.40 million (54%) in the election.

== Political positions ==
The New York Times reported in 2014 that Gillespie had "ties to both Republican grass-roots and establishment wings."

=== Abortion ===
In January 2017 he participated in the anti-abortion March for Life. Gillespie said he would support a ban on late-term abortions after 20 weeks in Virginia, with exceptions for cases of rape, incest, or pregnancies that endanger the life of the mother. Gillespie was endorsed by the National Right to Life Committee in his 2017 run for governor.

Gillespie pledged to sign legislation to defund Planned Parenthood; Governor Terry McAuliffe vetoed such legislation.

=== Confederate monuments ===
In August 2017, Gillespie signed a petition opposing the removal of Confederate monuments in Virginia. Gillespie said that removing the monuments was an attempt to erase history. In a September 2017 gubernatorial debate, Gillespie said that the statues were history and could be used to teach people about slavery in the South. He said a better remedy would be to erect statues honoring people like Douglas Wilder, a former Virginia governor who was the nation's first African-American to be elected governor.

=== Economy ===
In September 2017 Gillespie called for a 10 percent across-the-board income tax cut.

=== Education ===
Gillespie has called for the expansion of publicly funded schools that are operated privately.

=== Energy and environment ===
In a debate in 2014, Gillespie was asked by his opponent if he thought there was enough evidence to support climate change. Gillespie at first dodged the question but when pressed again, answered, "I believe there is ample scientific evidence that contributes to climate change but I'm not entirely dismissive of those who have a different point of view."

In September 2017 Gillespie supported President Trump's decision to withdraw the United States from the Paris Climate Agreement. Gillespie supported President Trump's decision to repeal the Clean Power Plan, which aimed to reduce emissions from coal-burning power plants. Gillespie opposes efforts at the state level to limit carbon emissions. Gillespie opposes Virginia joining a so-called "state climate alliance" to mitigate the effects of climate change. Gillespie supports offshore drilling.

In 2014 and 2017 he voiced support for the Keystone Pipeline, Atlantic Coast Pipeline, and Mountain Valley Pipeline and criticized federal regulations that "[slow] down the development of energy infrastructure."

=== Ethics laws ===
In his 2017 gubernatorial campaign, Gillespie pledged to push a ban on candidates using campaign funds for personal expenses, to require administration officials to wait at least two years before lobbying their prior office, and to require more frequent disclosures of potential conflicts of interest. He also proposed prohibiting candidates from using funds raised for one campaign in a campaign for a different office; prohibiting fundraising during special legislative sessions; and live-streaming certain public cabinet meetings and all agency and board meetings. In response to criticism of his lobbying history, Gillespie's campaign said he and his wife would place their assets in a blind trust and that he would be "an honest, ethical, principled, hard-working, faithful servant-leader worthy of Virginia."

=== Guns ===
Gillespie has called for rescinding legislation that banned members of the public from carrying firearms in state government buildings. Gillespie is open to the idea of banning bump stocks, which allow a semi-automatic firearm to fire in rapid succession.

=== Health care ===
In 2014, Gillespie said that he was opposed to the 2010 Affordable Care Act (commonly called Obamacare), criticizing it for its "negative impacts" and stating that he would "repeal and replace it." In 2017, Gillespie said that he opposed Medicaid expansion and said that Virginia should create an interstate compact allowing insurance providers to sell health insurance plans across state lines.

=== Immigration ===
In July and August 2017, Gillespie said that he opposes "sanctuary cities", which adopt policies designed to not prosecute people solely for being undocumented. In February 2017, he supported a bill that would prohibit localities in Virginia from enacting sanctuary policies. He has campaigned on tougher immigration enforcement.

In September 2017, Gillespie said that he supported Donald Trump's executive order to ban immigration from seven predominantly Muslim countries. That same month, Gillespie, after initially declining to take a stance on Trump's decision to rescind Deferred Action for Childhood Arrivals (DACA)—which gives temporary stay to some unauthorized immigrants who came to the United States as minors—Gillespie said that he did not "believe that children should be punished for decisions that were not their own, but at the same time, it is important for us to enforce our laws".

Shortly after the Trump administration announced that it would rescind Deferred Action for Childhood Arrivals, Gillespie said that "dreamers" should not be deported.

In his 2006 book, Winning Right, Gillespie wanted to offer temporary work visas to undocumented workers in the US. Asked in 2017 if he still held that view, Gillespie said he did.

=== LGBT rights ===
In 2004, as chairman of the RNC, Gillespie opposed same-sex marriage and supported the Republican platform plank in support of constitutional amendment banning gay marriage. In 2014, as a candidate for the U.S. Senate, Gillespie renounced this position, saying he no longer supported such an amendment.

In September 2017 he said he would oppose any legislation that would dictate which bathrooms that transgender individuals could use, such as the controversial North Carolina Public Facilities Privacy & Security Act. Earlier, in January 2017, Gillespie did not take a firm position when the Virginia General Assembly was considering a bathroom bill, opting instead to criticize the Obama administration for mandating that public schools allow transgender students to use the restrooms of their choice while saying that localities should decide on the issue.

=== Marijuana ===
Gillespie opposes marijuana decriminalization because it "sends the wrong signal" to young people. Gillespie has called for changing the punishment for marijuana possession so that no criminal charges would be filed on the first two occasions that someone is caught with marijuana, but that the third time should carry criminal charges because by then "you really should know better."

=== Redistricting ===
In a 2017 gubernatorial debate with Ralph Northam, in response to a question about redistricting following the 2020 Census, Gillespie said that experience in other states showed that it was "hard to take the politics out of politics."

=== Restoration of rights ===
Gillespie favors restoring voting rights to felons "who have paid their debt to society and are living an honest life" but opposes a blanket restoration of rights to all felons. In the final weeks of the 2017 gubernatorial campaign, Gillespie began running an ad criticizing Democrats for restoring voting rights to more than 200,000 felons, including John Bowen, whose rights were restored based on his completing sentence for an earlier conviction while he was awaiting trial on a new charge of possessing one of the largest child pornography collections in Virginia's history.

== Personal life ==
Gillespie met his wife Cathy at a congressional softball game and together they have a son and two daughters.

Party political offices
Preceded by Marc Racicot	Chair of the Republican National Committee; 2003–2005	Succeeded by Ken Mehlman
Preceded by Kate Obenshain	Chair of the Virginia Republican Party; 2006–2007	Succeeded by John Hager
Preceded by Jim Gilmore	Republican nominee for U.S. Senator from Virginia (Class 2); 2014	Succeeded by Daniel Gade
Preceded by Ken Cuccinelli	Republican nominee for Governor of Virginia; 2017	Succeeded by Glenn Youngkin
Political offices
Preceded by Dan Bartlett	Counselor to the President; 2007–2009	Vacant Title next held by Pete Rouse
