= Phil Eyler =

Canadian politician

- Born: Philip Lee Eyler; September 1, 1948 (age 77); Hagerstown, Maryland
- Education: Carleton University; University of Manitoba
- Occupation: Politician
- Political party: New Democratic Party of Manitoba

Philip Lee Eyler (born September 1, 1948 in Hagerstown, Maryland) is a former politician in Manitoba, Canada. He was a New Democratic member of the Legislative Assembly of Manitoba from 1981 to 1986.

The son of Donald W. Eyler and Helen F. Dern, he was educated at Bridgewater College, Carleton University in Ottawa, Ontario, and the University of Manitoba. He has several academic degrees, including a certificate in resource management from the latter institution. In 1975, Eyler married Paula J. Harper.

He was elected to the Manitoba legislature in the provincial election of 1981, defeating Progressive Conservative candidate Harold Piercy by 46 votes in the upscale north Winnipeg riding of River East. He was not appointed to cabinet, but served as Deputy Speaker from December 2, 1982 to February 11, 1986.

Eyler lost to Tory candidate Bonnie Mitchelson in the 1986 provincial election. The NDP have been unable to recover the seat in the intervening years, and Eyler has not sought a comeback in provincial politics. Following his defeat, he was appointed to the Ministry of Industry, Trade and Tourism. Eyler currently resides in Kenora, Ontario.
