= Bridgewater Historic District (Bridgewater, Virginia) =

Historic district in Virginia, United States

- U.S. National Register of Historic Places
- U.S. Historic district
- Virginia Landmarks Register
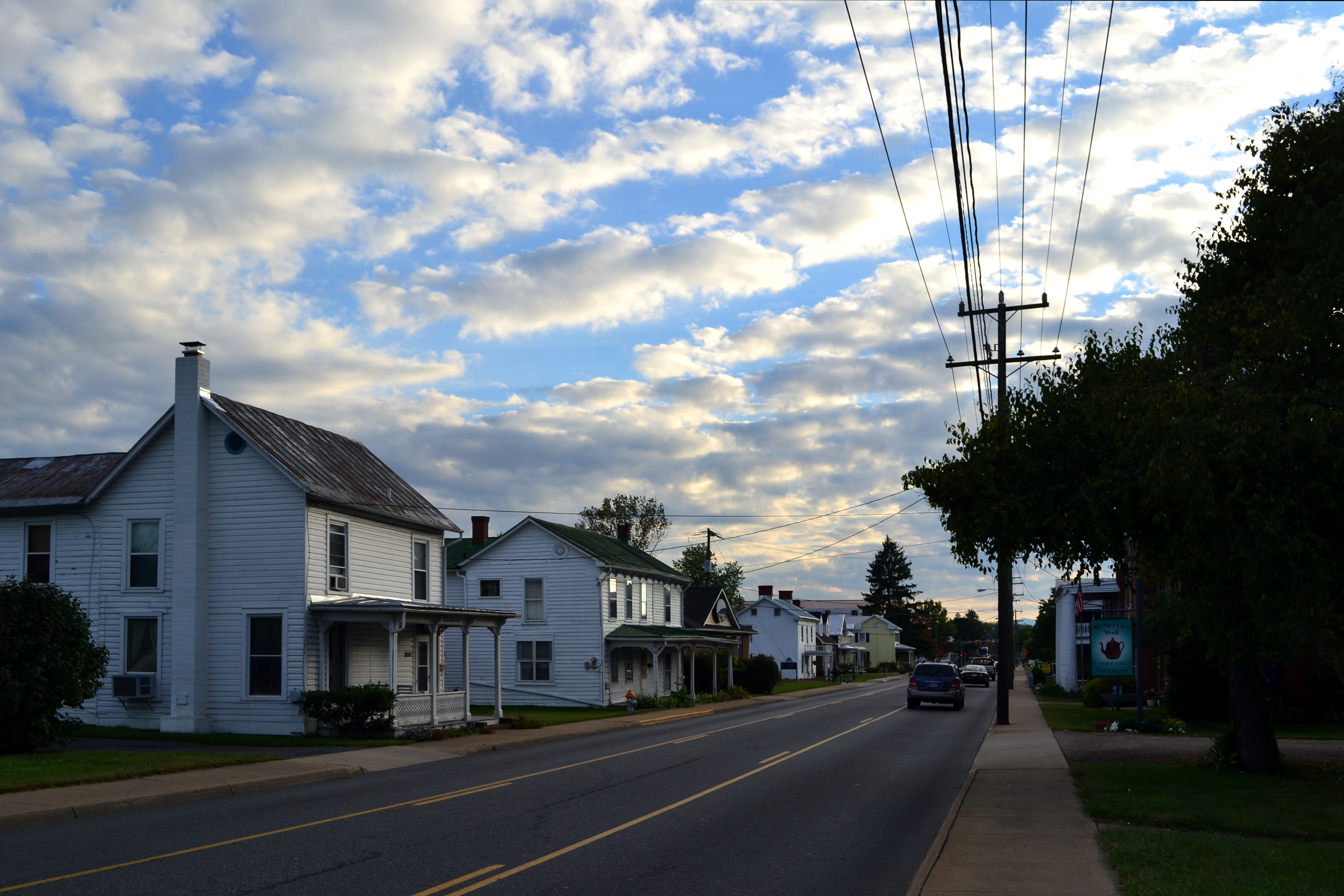
- Main Street, Bridgewater VA, September 2013

- Location within Virginia Location within the United States
- Location: Roughly Main St. from North River to Crawford Ave., E. College, Gravel Lane and Bank St., Bridgewater, Virginia
- Coordinates: 38°22′54″N 78°58′28″W
- Area: 68 acres (28 ha)
- Architectural style: Late 19th And Early 20th Century American Movements, Late Victorian, Vernacular "I" House
- NRHP reference No.: 84000477
- VLR No.: 176-0003

Significant dates
- Added to NRHP: November 1, 1984
- Designated VLR: June 19, 1984

Bridgewater Historic District is a national historic district located at Bridgewater, Rockingham County, Virginia. The district encompasses 127 contributing buildings and 1 contributing site in the central business district and surrounding residential areas of the town of Bridgewater. It includes a variety of residential, commercial, and institutional buildings most of which date from the 19th century and early-20th century. Notable buildings include the Jacob Dinkle House, the St. Claire Kyle House, the J. G. Brown House, Dr. T. H. B. Brown House, the Hite House, Childress House, Whitmore House, the O. W. Miller House, Dr. Strickler House, Masonic Lodge, Methodist Church (1841), Baptist Church (1855, 1883), Farmer's Bank (c. 1883), Berlin Building (1883), Geary Building (1887), and the Lutheran Church (1881). Also included is the oldest portion of the Bridgewater College campus, consisting of five fine brick collegiate buildings constructed before 1911.

It was listed on the National Register of Historic Places in 1984.
