= Warren B. French =

American politician (1923–2021)

Chair of the Virginia Republican Party
- In office January 16, 1970 – June 3, 1972
- Preceded by: Samuel E. Carpenter
- Succeeded by: Richard D. Obenshain

Personal details
- Born: April 14, 1923 Woodstock, Virginia, U.S.
- Died: November 4, 2021 (aged 98) Edinburg, Virginia, U.S.
- Party: Republican
- Spouse: Patricia Hamill Teale (m. 1949)
- Children: 4
- Education: Massanutten Military Academy; University of Virginia

Military service
- Branch/service: United States Navy
- Battles/wars: World War II; Pacific Theater

Warren Ballinger French Jr. (April 14, 1923 – November 4, 2021) was an American businessman and politician from Virginia. He served as Chair of the Virginia Republican Party from 1970 to 1972.

== Early life ==
French was born on April 14, 1923, in Woodstock, Virginia, the first of ten children of Warren French Sr. and Lena Belle Sheetz. He attended Woodstock High School, Massanutten Military Academy, and the University of Virginia. In September 1941, he entered the V-12 Navy College Training Program, and later served in the United States Navy during World War II in the Pacific Theater. He was discharged from service in 1946, and returned to the University of Virginia where he received his Bachelor of Science in Electrical Engineering in 1947. In 1954, he started working for the Farmers Mutual Telephone System in Shenandoah County.

== Political career ==
French served as the Seventh District Republican Party Chairman, delegate to the 1968 Republican National Convention, and Chairman of the Republican Party of Virginia from 1970 to 1972. He was elected chair on January 16, 1970, replacing Samuel E. Carpenter, who resigned. In 1972, he received the endorsement of Governor Linwood Holton for reelection as chair, but lost to the more conservative challenger, Richard D. Obenshain. French lost in a lopsided vote, 769 votes for Obenshain compared to just 288 votes for French.

== Personal life ==
He married his wife Patricia Hamill Teale, in Silver Spring, Maryland, on September 17, 1949. They had four children. He died on November 4, 2021, aged 98 of natural causes.
