= John H. Hager =

American businessman and politician (1936–2020)

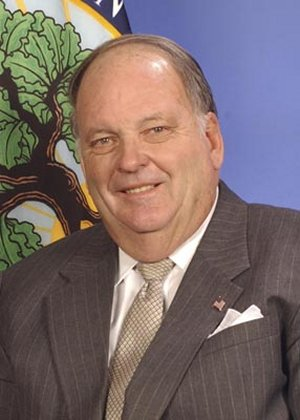

Chair of the Virginia Republican Party
- In office August 1, 2007 – May 31, 2008
- Preceded by: Ed Gillespie
- Succeeded by: Jeff Frederick

Assistant Secretary for Special Education and Rehabilitative Services
- In office November 21, 2004 – August 1, 2007
- President: George W. Bush
- Secretary: Rod Paige; Margaret Spellings
- Preceded by: Robert Pasternack
- Succeeded by: Tracy Ralph Justesen

37th Lieutenant Governor of Virginia
- In office January 17, 1998 – January 12, 2002
- Governor: Jim Gilmore
- Preceded by: Don Beyer
- Succeeded by: Tim Kaine

Personal details
- Born: John Henry Hager; August 28, 1936 Durham, North Carolina, U.S.
- Died: August 23, 2020 (aged 83) Richmond, Virginia, U.S.
- Resting place: Hollywood Cemetery Richmond, Virginia
- Party: Republican
- Spouse: Margaret Chase Hager
- Children: 2
- Education: Purdue University (BS); Harvard University (MBA)
- Profession: Businessman

Military service
- Allegiance: United States
- Branch/service: United States Army
- Rank: Captain

John Henry Hager (August 28, 1936 – August 23, 2020) was an American politician who served as the 37th Lieutenant Governor of Virginia from 1998 to 2002. He was the first person with a disability to be elected to that office. He proceeded to act as an assistant secretary within the United States Department of Education from 2004 to 2007. He worked for the American Tobacco Company from the 1960s until 1994, and was the chairman of the Republican Party of Virginia from August 2007 until May 2008.

== Early life and education ==
Hager was born in Durham, North Carolina, to Virgil (1905–2002) and Ruth Rabbe Hager (1906–2000); both were 1928 Purdue alumni. He started a neighborhood newspaper in 1945. While an undergraduate at Purdue University, he ran a vending machine business, was an active member of Sigma Alpha Epsilon, and was a member of ROTC. One term, his course load was 25 credit hours – about two-thirds more than normal. He graduated with a BSME (mechanical engineering) in 1958. Hager earned his MBA from Harvard Business School in 1960, and subsequently served in the United States Army, rising to the rank of captain.

== Career ==
After his active duty military service, Hager began work for the American Tobacco Company in Richmond, Virginia. The company retired him after his bout with polio, but he returned – beginning at the bottom again. At American Tobacco, he served as a government affairs representative. Hager was forcibly retired from the American Tobacco Company after the company's sale to Brown & Williamson in 1994.

In 1975, he volunteered for Lieutenant Governor John N. Dalton, and in 1984 he was a delegate to the Republican National Convention. In 1994, he co-chaired the Senatorial campaign for Oliver North. He ran for state party chairman in 1992, and was treasurer of the state Republican Party in 1994.

Hager served as the director of Virginia's homeland security under Governors Jim Gilmore and Mark Warner. He was elected Lieutenant Governor of Virginia in 1997, defeating Democrat Lewis F. Payne Jr. At one of the hustings in the aforementioned election, he said, "I've met a lot of challenges in my life. It's been a trail of turning challenge into opportunity". Hager was the first individual with a disability to be elected to that office, and is believed to be the first in any U.S. state to have been so.

Hager ran for Governor of Virginia in 2001, but lost the Republican nomination to Virginia's then Attorney General, Mark Earley. The latter ultimately lost the gubernatorial election to Democrat Mark Warner. Hager went on to serve in Warner's cabinet as the state's homeland security director in the Office of Commonwealth Preparedness. This post was created in the aftermath of the September 11 attacks.

Hager was the Assistant Secretary of the Department of Education's Office of Special Education and Rehabilitation Services. He was nominated to this position by President George W. Bush on May 24, 2004, and confirmed by the Senate on November 21, 2004. While in office, he endeavored to finalize the department's regulations concerning the reauthorized Individuals with Disabilities Education Act (IDEA) within one year, as well as to give technical assistance to states in implementing IDEA. He also sought to enhance the Department's outreach, and advocated for transition services for individuals with disabilities to be given more attention. He resigned after three years at the helm, effective August 1, 2007.

In July 2007, Hager was elected to serve as chairman of the Republican Party of Virginia. However, he was defeated for reelection by Delegate Jeff Frederick less than a year later in May 2008.

== Personal life ==
Hager married Margaret Dickinson "Maggie" Chase on February 27, 1971. The couple had two sons, John (b. 1973) and Henry (b. 1978). Hager's younger son, Henry, married Jenna Bush, the daughter of George W. Bush the 43rd President of the United States, on May 10, 2008, at her parents' Prairie Chapel Ranch in Crawford, Texas.

In 1973, he contracted polio when his son was vaccinated for the disease with live virus vaccine. As a result, he used a non-motorized wheelchair for daily ambulation. He was known to compete in wheelchair races.

=== Death ===
Hager died on August 23, 2020, five days prior to his 84th birthday. Governor Ralph Northam ordered state flags to be flown at half-staff until sunset on September 2. He was buried in Hollywood Cemetery in Richmond.

== Memberships ==
- American Legion
- Chairman, Disability Commission
- vice-chmn. Gov.'s Commn. on Transp. Policy
- bd. dir., vice-chair Aerospace State Assn.
- Director, President, Sorensen Institute of Political Leadership
- Finance Committee, Virginia Museum of Fine Arts
- past pres., trustee, exec. com. Children's Hosp.

== Honors and awards ==
- Honorary degree from Mary Washington College
- Honorary degree from Averett College
- Honorary degree from the University of Northern Virginia
- Distinguished Engineering Alumnus, Purdue University College of Engineering, 2007
- Outstanding Young Men of America, 1976
- Man of the Year, Tobacco International Magazine, 1990
- Alumni Citizenship award, Purdue University, 1987
- Distinguished Alumni award, Durham Academy, 1992
- Lettie Pate Whitehead Evans award, Westminster-Canterbury, 1997
- Humanitarian award, National Conference for Community and Justice, 2002

Political offices
Preceded by Don Beyer	Lieutenant Governor of Virginia; January 17, 1998 – January 14, 2002	Succeeded by Tim Kaine
