= Lily Franklin =

American politician

Member of the Virginia House of Delegates from the 41st district
- Incumbent
- Assumed office January 14, 2026
- Preceded by: Chris Obenshain

Personal details
- Born: Roanoke, Virginia
- Party: Democratic
- Education: Longwood University

Lily Franklin is an American politician who was elected member of the Virginia House of Delegates in 2025. A member of the Democratic Party, she defeated incumbent Republican candidate Chris Obenshain.

== Career ==
Franklin worked as a high school math teacher in a public school. She also served as a state legislative aide.

=== Virginia House of Delegates ===
==== 2023 election ====
In 2023, Franklin ran as the Democratic candidate for Virginia's 41st House of Delegates district, which covers parts of Montgomery and Roanoke counties. She faced Republican Chris Obenshain in a competitive race. The election was not called for nearly a week as provisional ballots were counted.

Franklin lost the 2023 election by a narrow margin. The final margin was 181 votes, 183 votes, or "fewer than 200 votes." The final result was 50.3 percent for Obenshain to Franklin's 49.6 percent, a margin of less than one percentage point. During this campaign, Franklin's spending exceeded $960,000.

==== 2025 election ====
In 2024, Franklin announced she would again seek the 41st District seat in 2025, setting up a rematch with Obenshain. Her announcement included endorsements from U.S. representative Abigail Spanberger and speaker of the house Don Scott.

The race, which was in a district of approximately 55,000 voters, was one of the 10 most-advertised House of Delegates races in Virginia that year. Franklin's campaign outraised her opponent, raising $2.27 million by election day, and spent $910,000 on advertising.

On election night, November 5, 2025, Franklin won the election, flipping the seat from Republican to Democratic control. Unofficial results from that night showed her with a lead of 2.46 percentage points by 10:45 p.m.

== Political positions ==
During her campaigns, Franklin stated that top issues for voters included lowering electric bills and increasing access to affordable home ownership.

As a former public school teacher, Franklin opposes school voucher systems, arguing they take money from public schools and are "not even feasible."

Franklin has stated her support for the Second Amendment while also expressing her belief that "weapons of war don't belong in our classrooms and on our streets."

Franklin is "in full support of reproductive rights" and supports proposed constitutional amendments to protect those rights, as well as legislation to protect access to contraception.

Franklin supports state-level utility reform to lower electric rates and has expressed support for rent caps and other housing incentives. She supports initiatives to bring "good-paying jobs" with benefits to Southwest Virginia.

== Elections ==
Virginia's 41st House of Delegates District, 2023 general election
Party	Candidate	Votes	%
Republican	Chris Obenshain	12,529	50.31
Democratic	Lily Franklin	12,346	49.57
Write-in		29	0.12
Total votes		24,904	100
Republican win (new seat)			

Virginia's 41st House of Delegates District, 2025 General Election
Party	Candidate	Votes	%
Democratic	Lily Franklin	17,683	53.29%
Republican	Chris Obenshain (Incumbent)	15,460	46.59%
Write-in		41	0.12%
Total votes		33,184	100%
Democratic gain from Republican			
