= Robert Pasternack =

American politician

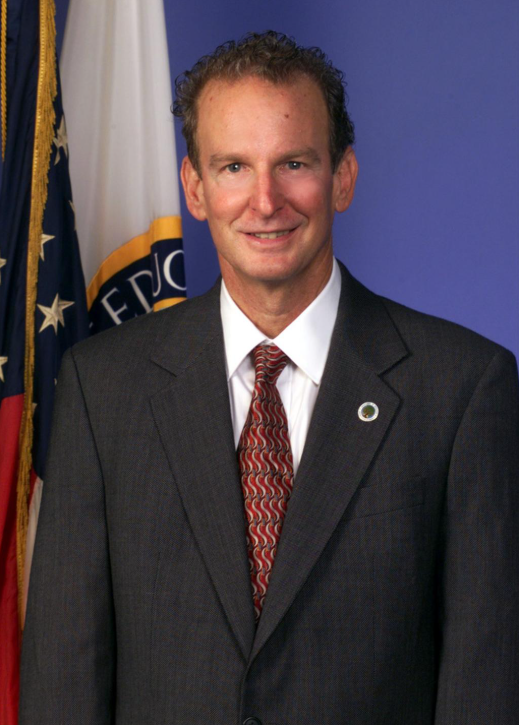
- Pasternack in 2001

Assistant Secretary of Education for Special Education and Rehabilitative Services
- In office August 8, 2001 – November 21, 2004
- President: George W. Bush
- Preceded by: Judith Heumann
- Succeeded by: John H. Hager

State Director of Special Education for the New Mexico State Department of Education
- In office January 1998

Personal details
- Born: Robert Harry Pasternack Brooklyn, New York
- Spouse: Jeanelle Livingston
- Children: 2
- Occupation: Educator, Psychologist and Politician

Robert Harry Pasternack is an American educator, psychologist and politician. He served as the Assistant Secretary of Education for Special Education and Rehabilitative Services from August 8, 2001 until his resignation in 2004, where he was succeeded by John H. Hager on November 21, 2004. Pasternack currently serves as the State Director of Special Education for the New Mexico State Department of Education.

== Early life and education ==
Robert Harry Pasternack was born in Brooklyn, New York. Pasternack got a bachelor's degree in psychology from the University of South Florida in 1970, a master's degree in guidance and counseling at New Mexico Highlands University in 1972, and a Ph.D in Special Education along with a minor in neuropsychology at the University of New Mexico in 1980.

== Career ==
From 1994 to 1998, Pasternack served as the CEO of Casa de Corazon, a children's community mental health center. He also served as the Director of Clinical Services for Taos and Colfax Community Services, Inc.

=== Political career ===
Pasternack began serving as the State Director of Special Education for the New Mexico State Department of Education in January 1998. He was officially nominated as the Assistant Secretary of Education for Special Education and Rehabilitative Services by George W. Bush on August 20, 2001. On November 21, 2004, Pasternack announced his retirement from his position.

== Personal life ==
In April 1980, Pasternack married Jeanelle Livingston. They later had 2 children.
