= Virginia's 41st House of Delegates district =

Virginia legislative district

District map from the 2023 election

Virginia's 41st House of Delegates district elects one of 100 seats in the Virginia House of Delegates, the lower house of the state's bicameral legislature. District 41 represents parts of Montgomery County, Virginia and Roanoke County, Virginia. The seat is currently held by Democrat Lily Franklin since 2026. Prior to the recent redistricing which moved the 41st district from Northern Virginia to Southwest Virginia, the district was represented by Democrat Eileen Filler-Corn. Filler-Corn was the Speaker of the House from 2020 to 2022.

== Geography ==
Prior to the 2023 election, District 41 represented part of Fairfax County, Virginia.

District 41 now represents parts of Montgomery County, Virginia and Roanoke County, Virginia.

== Elections ==
=== 2010-2021 Fairfax County ===
Democrat Eileen Filler-Corn first took office on March 3, 2010, after winning a special election the day before: she defeated Republican Kerry Bolognese by 37 votes. She was reelected again in 2011, 2013, 2015, and 2017.

In 2019, Filler-Corn became the Minority Leader (Leader of the Democratic Caucus) of the House of Delegates.

In the November 2019 general election, Filler-Corn ran against Libertarian Rachel Mace and Independent John Wolfe. She won with 71.6% of the vote. She was reelected again in 2021.

=== 2023-present Montgomery County and Roanoke County ===
Virginia's 41st House of Delegates district election, 2023
Party	Candidate	Votes	%
Republican	Chris Obenshain	12,529	50.31%
Democratic	Lily Franklin	12,346	49.57%
Write-in		29	0.12%
Total votes		24,904	100.00%

Virginia's 41st House of Delegates district election, 2025
Party	Candidate	Votes	%
Democratic	Lily Franklin	17,683	53.29%
Republican	Chris Obenshain (incumbent)	15,460	46.59%
Write-in		41	0.12%
Total votes		33,184	100.00%
Democratic gain from Republican			
