= Chris Obenshain =

American politician from Virginia

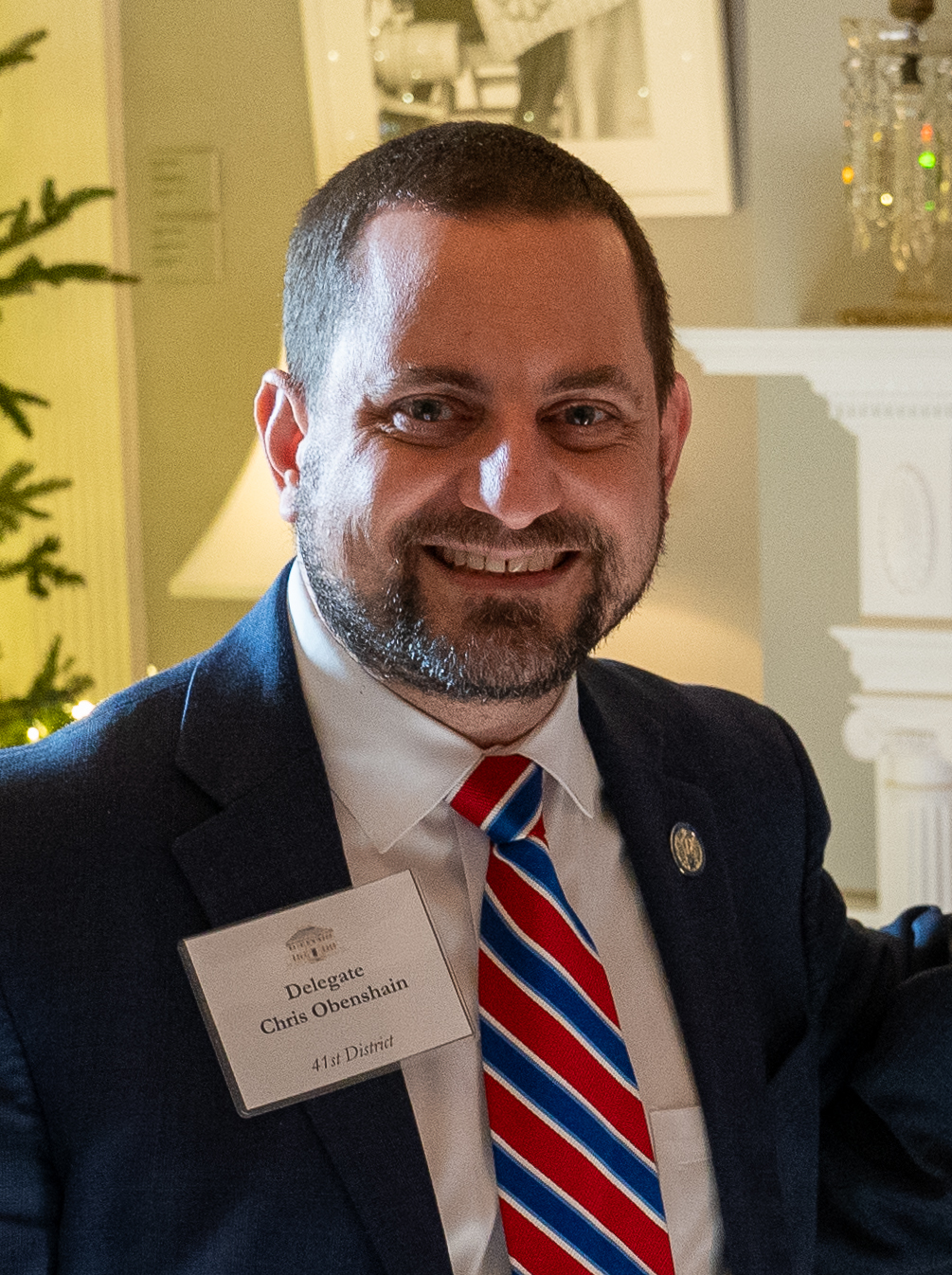
- Obenshain in 2024

Member of the Virginia House of Delegates from the 41st district
- In office January 10, 2024 – January 14, 2026
- Preceded by: Eileen Filler-Corn (redistricting)
- Succeeded by: Lily Franklin

Personal details
- Born: Joseph Christian Obenshain
- Party: Republican
- Relatives: Kate (cousin); Mark (cousin); Richard (uncle)
- Education: Bridgewater College (BA); University of Virginia (JD)
- Occupation: Lawyer; politician

Joseph Christian Obenshain is an American Republican politician from Virginia. He was elected to the Virginia House of Delegates in the 2023 Virginia House of Delegates election from the 41st district.

Obenshain was a prosecutor in the Montgomery County Commonwealth Attorney's office.

Obenshain lost reelection in 2025 to Democrat Lily Franklin, whom he narrowly defeated in 2023.

== Education ==
Obenshain graduated from Cave Spring High School in Roanoke, Virginia. He attended Bridgewater College and University of Virginia School of Law.

== Personal life ==
As of 2023, Obenshain lived in Blacksburg, Virginia. He is married with two children.

Obenshain's father, Joe, ran for the Virginia Senate in 2003. His late uncle, Richard, served as chairman of the Republican Party of Virginia and was the party's nominee for U.S. Senate in 1978, but died in a plane crash prior to the election day. He is a cousin of state senator Mark and political commentator Kate Obenshain.
