= Bridgewater College =

Private college in Bridgewater, Virginia, US

Coordinates: 38°22′45.7″N 78°58′10″W

- Former names: Spring Creek Normal and Collegiate Institute (1880–1889)
- Motto: College of Character, Community of Excellence
- Type: Private liberal arts college
- Established: 1880; 146 years ago (predecessor); 1889; 137 years ago (current institution)
- Religious affiliation: Church of the Brethren
- Endowment: $106.3 million (2025)
- President: David W. Bushman
- Faculty: 94 full-time
- Students: 1,448 (Fall 2024)
- Undergraduates: 1,407
- Postgraduates: 41
- Location: Bridgewater, Virginia, United States
- Colors: Red & gold
- Nickname: Eagles
- Sporting affiliations: NCAA Division III, Old Dominion Athletic Conference
- Website: bridgewater.edu
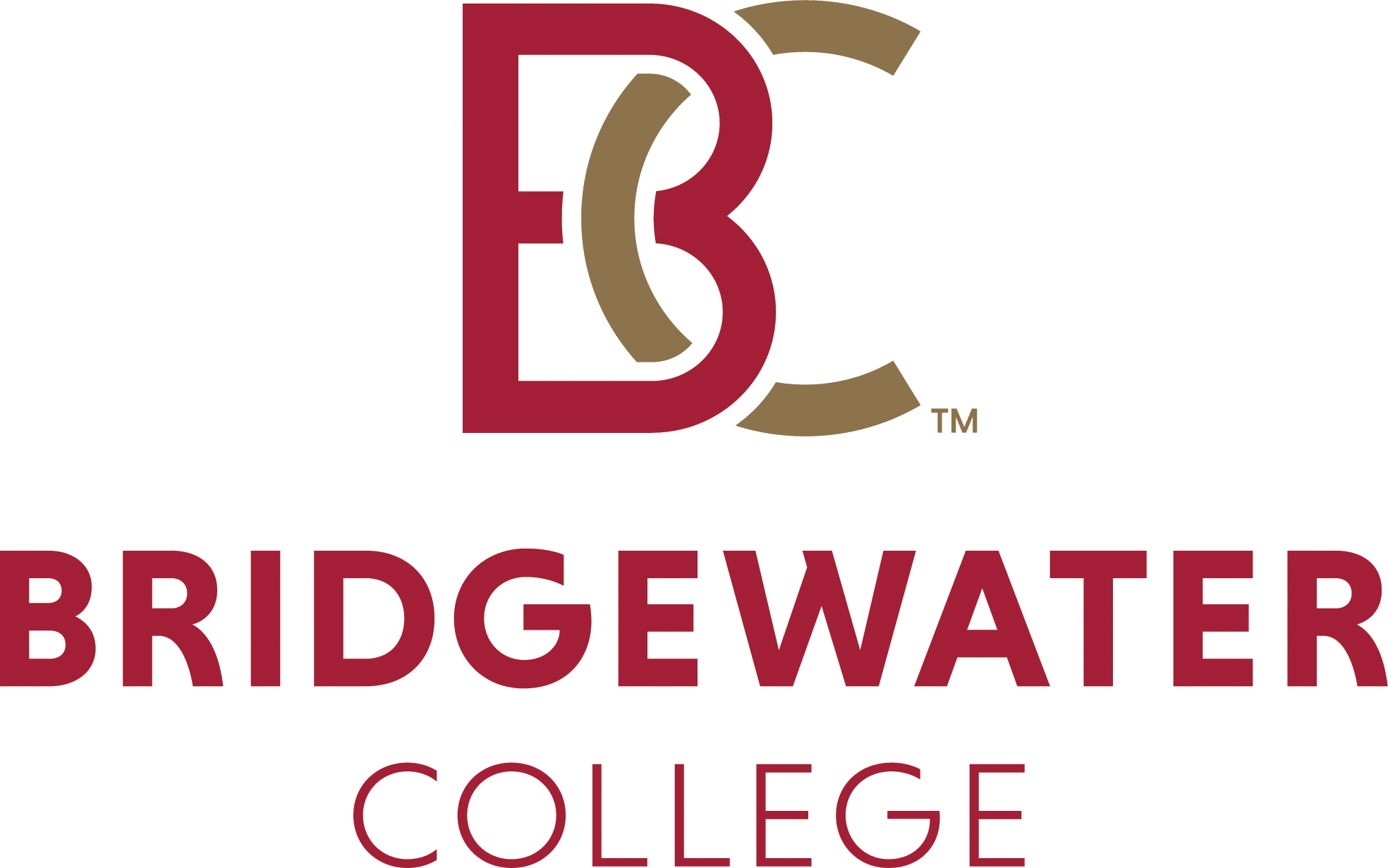

- Location within Shenandoah Valley Location within Virginia Location within the United States

Bridgewater College is a private liberal-arts college in Bridgewater, Virginia. Established in 1880, Bridgewater College admitted both men and women from the time of its founding and was the first four-year liberal arts college in Virginia to do so. Approximately 1,800 students are enrolled.

== History ==
Bridgewater College was established in 1880 as "Spring Creek Normal and Collegiate Institute" by Daniel Christian Flory. Nine years later, the school was named "Bridgewater College" and chartered by the Commonwealth of Virginia to grant undergraduate degrees. Bridgewater conferred its first Bachelor of Arts degree on June 1, 1891. In 1895, the Chairman of the Faculty, Walter B. Yount, a graduate of what would become Juniata College and the University of Virginia was named the college's first President. After his retirement in 1910, John S. Flory (an early Bridgewater graduate who also received degrees from other institution and had served on the faculty and as vice-president) succeeded him as the college's president.

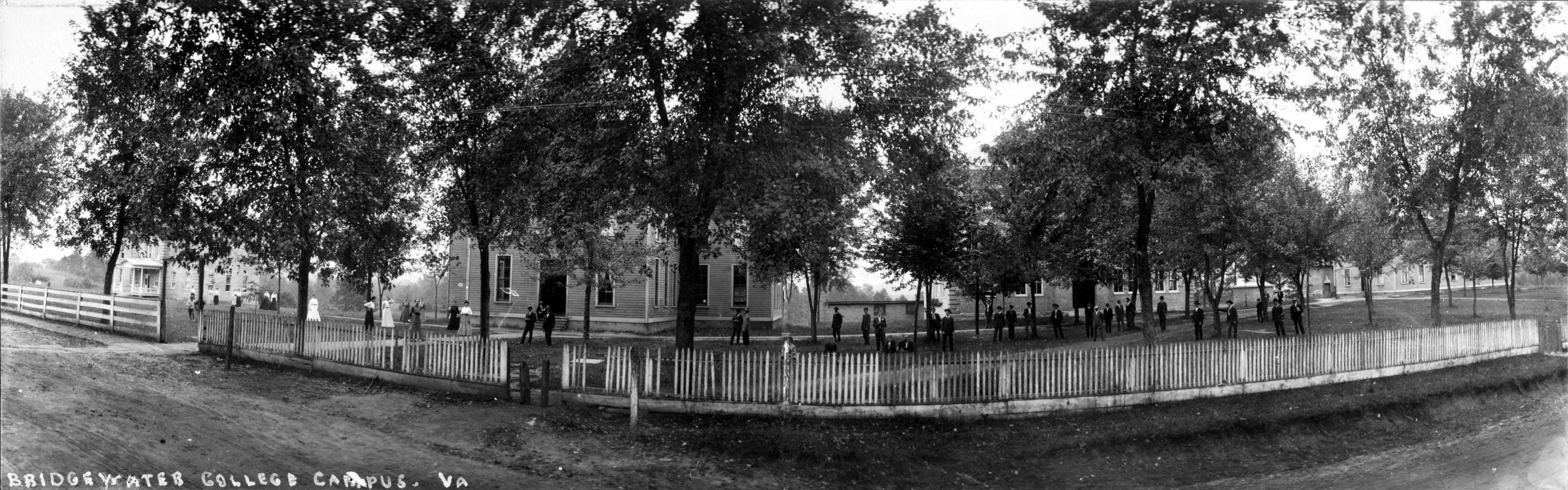
The college in 1907

Bridgewater College became the first senior co-educational liberal arts college in Virginia and one of the few accredited colleges of its type in the South.

The oldest portion of the Bridgewater College campus, consisting of five brick collegiate buildings constructed before 1911, is included in the Bridgewater Historic District. It was listed on the National Register of Historic Places in 1984.

=== 2022 shooting ===
On February 1, 2022, 55-year-old campus police officer John Painter and 48-year-old campus safety officer J.J. Jefferson were shot and killed on campus after being called to investigate a suspicious person on campus. The shooter, a 27-year-old former student named Alexander Wyatt Campbell, was later apprehended after a manhunt and suffered a gunshot injury at some point during the incident. In February 2024, Campbell plead guilty to murdering both officers and was sentenced to life in prison.

=== Repatriation of Native American items ===
The college is returning sacred funerary belongings and remains that were donated to the college. These items are protected by the Native American Graves Protection and Repatriation Act (NAGPRA).

== Academics ==
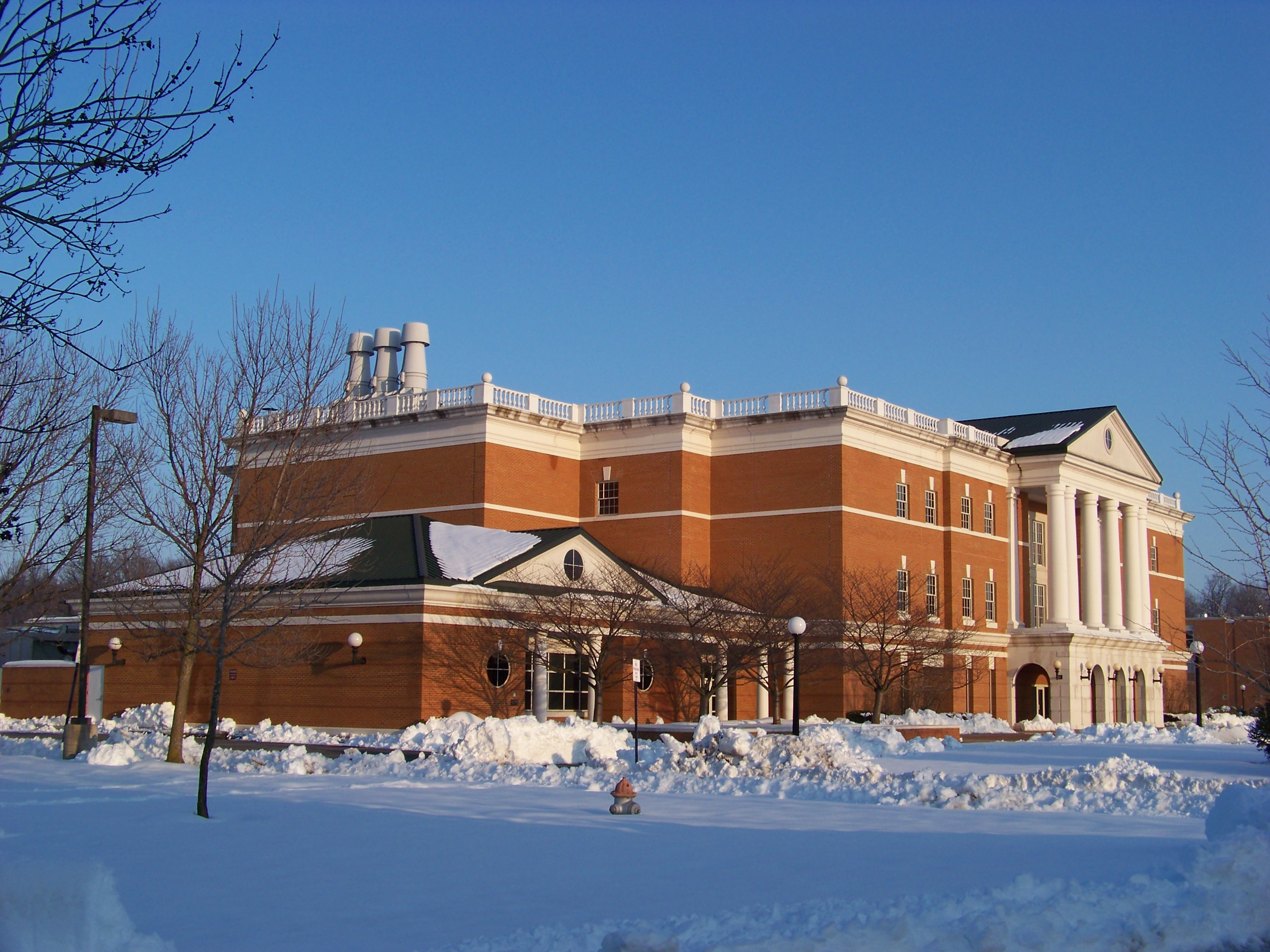
View of the college

Bridgewater offers more than 60 majors and minors, awarding the Bachelor of Arts and Bachelor of Science degrees. Bridgewater students have the opportunity to study abroad through the BCA Study Abroad program and May Term Travel Courses.

Bridgewater also offers the Flory Honors Program. Flory Fellows gain access to many opportunities and benefits, including honors sections of general education courses limited to 15 students each, housing within the honors community, and more.

Bridgewater was ranked #229 in national liberal arts colleges based on the U.S. News & World Report.

== Student life ==
=== Traditions ===
Annual events at Bridgewater College celebrate tradition, community, alumni, and culture. Founder's Day observance at Bridgewater commemorates the April 3, 1854, birth of Daniel Christian Flory, who began Bridgewater College in 1880, at the age of 26.

Homecoming weekend in October welcomes alumni back to the college with class reunions, outdoor festivities, a home football game and the annual Athletic Hall of Fame banquet.

=== Athletics ===
Bridgewater College is a Division III member of the National Collegiate Athletic Association (NCAA). Its teams are members of the Old Dominion Athletic Conference (ODAC), which has 14 member institutions.

== Notable people ==
=== Alumni ===
- G. Steven Agee, former Justice of the Supreme Court of Virginia and now a Judge on the United States Court of Appeals for the Fourth Circuit
- Pasco Middleton Bowman II, Senior federal judge on the United States Court of Appeals for the Eighth Circuit
- David Branshaw, professional golfer.
- Ray Bussard, former NCAA Championship (1978) winning Men's Swim Coach at University of Tennessee from 1968 to 1989
- Moses H. W. Chan, Physicist elected to the National Academy of Sciences in 2000
- Wolfgang Drechsler, German social scientist and government adviser
- Phil Eyler, Canadian politician
- Jacob A. Garber, U.S. Representative, 1929-1931
- Nathan H. Miller, politician
- Robert Newlen, acting Librarian of Congress, 2025-present
- Richard D. Obenshain, politician
- Chris Obenshain, politician

=== Faculty ===
- Carl Bowman, sociologist
