= Kate Griffin =

Kate Griffin may refer to:

- Kate Obenshain Griffin, former chairwoman of the Republican Party of Virginia
- Katie Griffin, Canadian actress, voice actress, and singer
- Kate Griffin, a pseudonym used by fantasy author Catherine Webb
- Kathy Griffin, American stand-up comedian and actress
