= Kathleen Griffin (camogie) =

Kathleen Marks (nee Griffin)
Personal information
- Native name: Caitlín Ní Ghríofa (Irish)
- Born: Roscrea, Tipperary 1935, Ireland

Sport
- Sport: Camogie
- Position: wing back
Clubs
- Years: Club
- St Patrick’s, Glengoole & Roscrea
Club titles
- All-Ireland Titles: 2
Inter-county
- Years: County
- Tipperary

Kathleen Marks (née Griffin), (born in 1935), is a former camogie player, who played for Tipperary in four All Ireland Camogie Championship finals without achieving the long-awaited breakthrough for Tipperary.

== Career ==
She won two All-Ireland Senior Club Camogie Championship medals with St Patrick’s, Glengoole in 1965 and 1966. She played in the All Ireland Camogie Championship finals of 1953, 1958, 1961 and 1965. She won Gael Linn Cup inter provincial medals and was later secretary of the Munster camogie council.

Kathleen Marks (Griffin), Rosemount, Roscrea is a woman who has dedicated her life to badminton, as a player, coach and administrator. She is one of the most dedicated sports people ever to come to Roscrea. She began playing badminton in Temperance Hall and later in the Abbey Hall for the Roscrea Club for a number of years where she also served as Chairperson for a time. She then progressed to play with the Thurles Club which was the leading club in the county at the time and, while she was there, she represented the club and won awards at both County and Munster Level.

Her involvement in coaching paved the way for Kathleen's involvement in administration and her first appointment was as Treasurer of the County Badminton Association and selector of the underage and adult teams at County Level. Kathleen then went on to become one of the Tipperary delegates on the Munster Branch of the Badminton Union and was elected President of the Munster Branch from 1982 - 1983. Then from 1994 -1995 she achieved the highest accolade when she was elected President of the Badminton Union of Ireland.

On 8 December 2002 Kathleen was presented with a prestigious European Award that only 3 people in Ireland have received at a function in Belfast. The presentation was made to Kathleen by the European Badminton Union. Kathleen was bestowed with this honour for her lifetime of commitment to badminton, a lifetime that has seen her remain the record holder as Ladies Singles champion, be a champion in both mixed and ladies doubles and Captain of the Tipperary team at Munster level.

== See also ==
- Wikipedia List of Camogie players
