= Mark Obenshain =

American politician (born 1962)

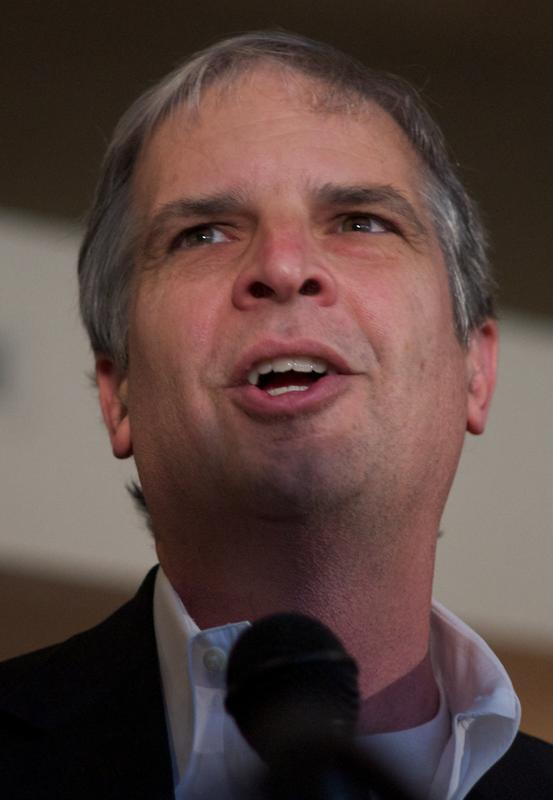

Member of the Virginia Senate
- Incumbent
- Assumed office January 14, 2004
- Preceded by: Kevin Miller
- Constituency: 26th District (2004–2024); 2nd District (since 2024)

Personal details
- Born: Mark Dudley Obenshain; June 11, 1962 (age 64) Richmond, Virginia, U.S.
- Party: Republican
- Spouse: Suzanne Speas
- Parent: Richard D. Obenshain (father)
- Relatives: Kate Obenshain (sister); Chris Obenshain (cousin)
- Education: Virginia Tech (BA); Washington and Lee University (JD)
- Website: Official website

Mark Dudley Obenshain (born June 11, 1962) is an American attorney and politician. He is currently serving as a member of the Senate of Virginia from Harrisonburg. He is a member of the Republican Party. He took office in 2004. At the 2013 state Republican convention he became the Republican nominee in the 2013 election for Attorney General of Virginia.

His father, Richard Obenshain, was an attorney, chairman of the Virginia Republican Party, and the original Republican nominee for the 1978 senate election in Virginia before his death from a plane crash prior to it.

== Political career ==
Obenshain has accumulated a conservative voting record since his election to the Shenandoah Valley's 26th state senate district in 2003. Obenshain's 2003 victory was a 68-32% win over former Harrisonburg mayor Rodney Eagle for an open seat

In the Senate, Obenshain is a member of the Agriculture, Conservation, and Natural Resources, Courts of Justice, Local Government, and the Privileges and Elections Committee. For fundraising and organizational purposes he is a member of the conservative Republican Senate Victory PAC. In 2007, Obenshain easily won reelection over Democrat Maxine Hope Roles 70-29 percent. Obenshain ran for re-election unopposed in 2011. Obenshain was the Republican nominee for Attorney General of Virginia, losing to Democrat Mark Herring in the 2013 Election and formally conceding on December 18.

=== Miscarriage reporting bill ===
During his run for attorney general in 2013, Obenshain was criticized for a bill he introduced in 2009 which would have required women who had miscarriages without medical attendance to report it to authorities within 24 hours. Obenshain explained that he introduced the bill in response to the case of a Virginia woman who threw her dead newborn baby's body into the trash, and was trying to create a bill to allow law enforcement to prosecute a woman in that circumstance. However, the legislation that emerged "was far too broad, and would have had ramifications that neither he nor the Commonwealth's attorney's office ever intended," and after being unable to resolve the problem of women potentially being prosecuted for miscarriages, he withdrew the bill and stated that he is "strongly against imposing any added burden for women who suffer a miscarriage, and that was never the intent of the legislation."

The bill, as proposed by Obenshain, would have required that when a fetal death occurred without medical attendance upon the mother at or after the delivery or abortion, the mother or someone acting on her behalf, within twenty-four hours, report the fetal death, location of the remains, and identity of the mother to the local or state police or sheriff's department of the city or county where the fetal death occurred. The bill also specified that no one should remove, destroy, or otherwise dispose of any remains without the express authorization of law-enforcement officials or the medical examiner, and that a violation of the statute would constitute a Class 1 misdemeanor.

== Personal life ==
Obenshain is married to Suzanne Speas Obenshain and is the founder of the Obenshain Law Group. Obenshain is a member of First Presbyterian Church and a former director of the Harrisonburg Rotary Club. Prior to joining the Senate, Obenshain was also a member of James Madison University's Board of Visitors and the Governor's Advisory Commission on Welfare Reform.

Obenshain studied economics and history at Virginia Tech then attended Washington and Lee School of Law. Obenshain is the son of former Virginia Republican Committee Chairman Richard D. Obenshain and the brother of another past chairman, Kate Obenshain. His cousin, Chris Obenshain, was elected to the Virginia House of Delegates in 2023.

Senate of Virginia
Preceded by Kevin Miller	Member of the Virginia Senate from the 26th district 2004–2024	Succeeded by Ryan McDougle
Preceded by Mamie Locke	Member of the Virginia Senate from the 2nd district 2024–present	Incumbent
Party political offices
Preceded by Ken Cuccinelli	Republican nominee for Attorney General of Virginia; 2013	Succeeded by John Adams
