= Republican Party of Virginia =

- Chairperson: Jeff Ryer
- Senate Minority Leader: Ryan McDougle
- House Minority Leader: Terry Kilgore
- Founded: 1854
- Headquarters: Obenshain Center; 115 E. Grace St. Richmond, Virginia 23219
- Student wing: High School Republican Federation of Virginia
- Membership (August 27, 2025): 1,790,540
- Ideology: Conservatism
- National affiliation: Republican Party
- Colors: Red
- Government of Virginia: 0 / 3
- Virginia Senate: 19 / 40
- Virginia House of Delegates: 36 / 100
- United States Senate: 0 / 2
- United States House of Representatives: 5 / 11
- Fairfax County Board of Supervisors: 1 / 10

Election symbol

Website
- virginia.gop

The Republican Party of Virginia (RPV) is the Virginia chapter of the Republican Party. It is based at the Richard D. Obenshain Center in Richmond. As of 2026, it holds none of the three statewide elected offices, a minority in both houses of the General Assembly, and 5 out of 11 U.S. House seats.

== History ==
=== Antebellum ===
Five Virginians (George Rye, John H. Atkinson, James Farley, Joseph Farley, and Mr. Ashley) attended the first national organizing convention of the Republican Party in Pittsburgh. John Curtiss Underwood, Rye, and H. Carpenter were the state's delegates to the 1856 Republican National Convention. They wanted to cast forty-five votes, three per congressional district and six at-large, but the convention only allotted them nine votes. They refused to vote in protest on both ballots. The delegation initially supported David Wilmot for the vice-presidential nomination, but later supported William L. Dayton.

Underwood formed the party's newspaper in Wheeling, the first in any of the border states using financial aid from William H. Seward. Underwood also received backing from Horace Greeley and Eli Thayer to form a colony for northern workers in Ceredo.

The first state convention was held on September 18, 1856, while Underwood was in another state due to threats of violence. William E. Stevenson, a future governor of West Virginia, was indicted for distributing an anti-slavery pamphlet. John C. Frémont received 291 votes in the state with 280 from the northwest.

Republicans, such as Cassius Marcellus Clay and Underwood, viewed John Brown's raid on Harpers Ferry as damaging to the party. Almost all of Abraham Lincoln's support in the 1860 election came from around Wheeling. The Republicans supported Francis Harrison Pierpont's unionist Virginia government during the Civil War.

=== 1860s ===
In June 1865, the Radical Republicans, which included many of the party's founders, held a convention in Alexandria which supported black suffrage. A rival Republican convention opposed to Pierpont was held in May 1866, by former Whigs under the leadership of John Botts, and formed the Union Republican Party. The convention passed resolutions criticizing Pierpont's government, supporting disenfranchising Confederates, and supporting qualified black suffrage. James W. Hunnicutt, who found most of his support among black people and the Union League, also vied for leadership of the party.

Senator Henry Wilson, at the request of Botts, had the Second Reconstruction Act conduct voting by ballot, which Botts believed would increase white support for Republicans. Wilson unsuccessfully attempted to have the act structured to result in Pierpont administering the constitutional convention election rather than the military commander. Hunnicutt's supporters initially controlled the 1868 constitutional convention and called for property confiscations. The Pierpont and Botts factions, and Horace Greeley feared that Hunnicutt's faction would ruin the electoral chances of the party.

Edward McPherson granted printing contracts to Hunnicutt's Richmond New Nation, but Hunnicutt complained that a majority of the contracts were given to the Alexandria Virginia State Journal.

One-third of the delegates to the constitutional convention were black. Underwood, a Radical who was friends with Greeley, was selected as president. Elihu B. Washburne and Schuyler Colfax advocated for the convention to be generous towards the voting rights of former Confederates while Hunnicutt supported disenfranchisement. The constitution written by the convention disfranchised a large number of Confederates and required loyalty oaths for local and state officials. John Schofield opposed the loyalty oath as it would not allow for enough men to fill offices.

Schofield removed Pierpont, who was appealing to the Radicals to aid in his election, from the governorship stating that his term had expired under the current constitution. Schofield sought a moderate and initially offered the position to Alexander Rives, but he declined and Henry H. Wells was appointed instead. Wells received the Republican gubernatorial nomination against other nominees, including Hunnicutt, but the loyalty oath requirement was maintained despite another attempt by Schofield. Schofield and Congress refused to finance the elections. The Radicals supported Wells while the conservatives and moderates supported Gilbert Carlton Walker, who won the election.

=== Later history ===
Virginia Republicans were active in fighting for the Union side in the American Civil War and helped lead the formation of the Restored Government of Virginia as well as the secession of what became the state of West Virginia. Republicans Francis Harrison Pierpont and Daniel Polsley were respectively elected the governor and lieutenant governor of the Restored Government, with Pierpont eventually taking power as the de facto governor of Virginia after the previous Democratic governor William Smith was removed from office and arrested. Two more Republicans would hold office for governor, Henry H. Wells and Gilbert Carlton Walker.

Republican fortunes turned downward as the Redeemer movement gathered apace and the Reconstruction era ended. A brief upturn occurred when William Mahone formed the Readjuster Party, a bi-racial populist coalition of Democrats and Republicans which held its height of power from 1870 to 1883. After the Virginia Constitutional Convention of 1902, which drafted and promulgated a new constitution which disfranchised almost all African Americans in the commonwealth, the Republican Party ceased to be an effective political party in Virginia.

The party reached its nadir of representation in the General Assembly, reaching handfuls of representation in either chamber and in the U.S. House until after 1964. Historically, from the late 19th into the mid-20th centuries, the 9th and 2nd congressional districts were the friendliest terrain for Republicans in the state (and some of the friendliest in the former Confederacy), encompassing areas which border West Virginia. Virginia Republicans managed to help Herbert Hoover and Charles Curtis win the 1928 election but would only regain their statewide competitiveness after Dwight D. Eisenhower carried the state in 1952. Linwood Holton would be elected in 1969 as the first Republican governor of Virginia in the 20th century, inaugurating an era of competitive elections between the two major parties.

== Current elected officials ==
Republicans are the minority in both the Virginia House of Delegates and Senate, and five of the state's eleven U.S. House seats are held by Republicans. As of 2026, the party hold no statewide offices.

=== Members of Congress ===
==== U.S. Senate ====
- None

Both of Virginia's U.S. Senate seats have been held by Democrats since 2009. John Warner was the last Republican to represent Virginia in the U.S. Senate. First elected in 1978, Warner opted to retire instead of seeking a sixth term. Former Governor Jim Gilmore ran as the Republican nominee in the 2008 election and was subsequently defeated by Democratic challenger Mark Warner who has held the seat since.

==== U.S. House of Representatives ====
Out of the 11 seats Virginia is apportioned in the U.S. House of Representatives, five are held by Republicans:

District	Member	Photo
1st	Rob Wittman	
2nd	Jen Kiggans	
5th	John McGuire	
6th	Ben Cline	
9th	Morgan Griffith	

=== Statewide offices ===
- None

== Leadership ==
Kate Obenshain Griffin of Winchester became the party's chairman in 2004. Following Senator George Allen's unsuccessful 2006 reelection bid, Griffin submitted her resignation as Chairman effective November 15, 2006. Her brother, Mark Obenshain, is a State Senator from Harrisonburg in the Virginia General Assembly. Both are the children of the late Richard D. Obenshain.

Ed Gillespie was elected as the new Chairman of the RPV on December 2, 2006. He resigned on June 13, 2007, to become the counselor to President George W. Bush. Mike Thomas served as interim chairman until July 21 when former Lieutenant Governor of Virginia John H. Hager was elected chairman. On April 9, 2007, the RPV named Fred Malek to serve as the Finance Chairman and Lisa Gable to serve as the Finance Committee Co-Chair.

On May 31, 2008, Hager was defeated in his bid for re-election at a statewide GOP convention by a strongly conservative member of the House of Delegates, Jeff Frederick of Prince William County. Frederick, who was then 32 years old, was the fifth party chairman in five years. On April 4, 2009, Frederick was removed from the position by RPV's State Central Committee, in a move backed by most of the senior GOP establishment. Many argued that Frederick's election and later removal was a war within the party between insiders and outsiders, or grassroots versus establishment Republicans. After his removal, Frederick considered seeking the chairman job again at the party's May 2009 convention, but decided against it. Pat Mullins, who was then the chairman of the Louisa County party unit and formerly the chairman of the Fairfax County party unit, was selected on May 2, 2009, to serve in the interim before a special election at state party convention later that month. Mullins won the special election at the May 30, 2009, convention, defeating Bill Stanley, the Franklin County chairman. Mullins was re-elected at the party's June 2012 convention. Mullins announced his retirement on November 5, 2014, a day after the Virginia GOP had a strong showing in the 2014 elections. 10th District Republican Committee chairman John Whitbeck was elected on January 24, 2015, by the party's State Central Committee to serve out the remainder of Mullins's term.

Whitbeck faced a challenge for the chairmanship for the 2016 election at the party's state convention from Vince Haley, who unsuccessfully ran for the Republican nomination for state senate in the 12th state Senate district in 2015. Haley withdrew his candidacy in early 2016, then tried to re-enter before the convention. At the convention, the party nominations committee ruled that Haley did not qualify to seek the office, and Whitbeck was re-elected unopposed to a full four-year term. Whitbeck resigned from his position on July 21, 2018, due to differences with Corey Stewart, the party's nominee for U.S. Senate in that year's race for U.S. Senate. In September 2018, Jack R. Wilson, the party's 4th Congressional District Chairman since 2007 and a lawyer from Chesterfield County, was elected to fill the balance of Whitbeck's term. On August 15, 2020, former Delegate Rich Anderson was elected to a four-year term.

The current chairman is Senator Mark Peake, who was elected April 12, 2025, to fill the vacancy created by Anderson's nomination as Assistant Secretary of the Air Force for Manpower and Reserve Affairs.

== Organization and candidate selection ==
The State Party Plan specifies the organization of the state party and how candidates will be selected. The 79-member State Central Committee sets the policy and plans for the party between larger State Conventions, which gather at least once every four years.

Candidates for elective office can be selected by (1) mass meetings, (2) party canvasses, (3) conventions, or (4) primaries. A mass meeting consists of a meeting where any participants must remain until votes are taken at the end. A party canvass or "firehouse primary" allows participants to arrive anytime during announced polling hours, cast a secret ballot, and then leave. A convention includes a process for selecting delegates, and then only the delegates may vote. Mass meetings, party canvasses and conventions are conducted by party officials and volunteers. Primaries are administered by the State Board of Elections at all established polling places. Because Virginia does not have party registrations, participation in primaries are open to any register voter regardless of party. However, on June 15, 2006, the Plan was amended to redefine a primary:

"Primary" is as defined in and subject to the Election Laws of the Commonwealth of Virginia, except to the extent that any provisions of such laws conflict with this Plan, infringe the right to freedom of association, or are otherwise invalid.

At the same time, the Plan was amended to require participants in any of the candidate selection methods to "express in open meeting either orally or in writing as may be required their intent to support all [Republican] nominees for public office in the ensuing election".

The candidate selection process has been criticized as favoring "party insiders" and disfavoring moderate candidates. For example, both Jim Gilmore and the more moderate Thomas M. Davis were seeking the 2008 Republican candidate for U.S. Senate. However, two weeks following the decision that the candidate will be selected at a convention instead of a primary, Davis announced that he would not seek the nomination.

=== Open primary litigation ===
Virginia does not provide for voters to register by party. Virginia law requires "open" primaries that are not restricted based on party registration:

All persons qualified to vote... may vote at the primary. No person shall vote for the candidates of more than one party.

In 2004, the Republican Party amended the State Party Plan to attempt to restrict participation in primaries to exclude voters who had voted in a Democratic primary after March 1, 2004, or in the last five years, whichever is more recent. In August 2004, Stephen Martin, an incumbent State Senator, designated that the Republican candidate for his seat in the November 2007 election should be selected by primary. The Republicans then sued the State Board of Elections demanding a closed primary be held, with taxpayer funding of a mechanism to exclude voters who had participated in past Democratic primaries.

The Federal District Court dismissed the suit on standing and ripeness grounds. The U.S. Court of Appeals for the Fourth Circuit reversed and sent the case back for a trial on its merits. The District Court then ruled that the rule forcing a party to accept the choice of its incumbent office holder of an open primary was unconstitutional. The state could continue to hold open primaries if a party opted for a primary instead of a mass meeting, party canvass, or convention to choose its nominees. On October 1, 2007, the Fourth Circuit affirmed this holding, which largely left Virginia's primary system intact, striking down only the rule allowing an incumbent officeholder to choose an open primary over the objection of his or her party.

The Republican State Central Committee dropped plans to require voters to sign a loyalty oath before voting in the February 2008 Presidential Primary. The party had proposed to require each voter to sign a pledge stating "I, the undersigned, pledge that I intend to support the nominee of the Republican Party for President." However, there was no way to enforce the pledge, and the proposal caused vocal public opposition.

At a March 20, 2014, meeting, John Ferguson defeated Leslie Williams to become Chairman of the Campbell County Republican Committee. Williams unsuccessfully challenged the meeting before the county committee and the Fifth Congressional District Republican Committee. However, the State Central Committee overturned the vote on the grounds that schoolteachers and public employees participated in the meeting and that they must have been Democrats. In response, Ferguson and the other party officials that were elected filed a lawsuit to block a new mass meeting to fill the seats.

=== Richard D. Obenshain Center ===
The party headquarters building is named the Richard D. Obenshain Center in memory of Richard D. Obenshain (1936–1978), the State Party Chairman who beginning in 1972, helped lead the party's renaissance in Virginia following 95 years of virtual control by the State's Democratic Party.

In 1978, "Dick" Obenshain had won the party's nomination to run for the U.S. Senate to replace retiring Senator William Scott when the 42-year-old candidate and two others were killed in an airplane crash of a twin-engine aircraft on August 2, 1978, while attempting a night landing at the Chesterfield County Airport. They had been returning to Richmond from a campaign appearance.

== List of Chairs ==
- William Henry Harrison Stowell (1872–1873)
- William Lamb (1895–1897)
- C. Bascom Slemp (1905–1918)
- Joseph L. Crupper (1918–1928)
- Robert H. Angell (1928–1933)
- H. B. McCormac (1933–1936)
- Clarence R. Ahalt (1937–1944)
- I. R. Dovell (1944–1947)
- Robert H. Woods (1947–1952)
- S. Floyd Landreth (1952–1956)
- Irwin Lee Potter (1956–1962)
- Horace E. Henderson (1962–1964)
- Robert J. Corber (1964–1968)
- Samuel E. Carpenter (1968–1970)
- Warren B. French (1970–1972)
- Richard D. Obenshain (1972–1978)
- Randy Forbes (1996–2001)
- Gary R. Thomson (2001–2003)
- Kate Obenshain (2003–2006)
- Ed Gillespie (2006–2007)
- John H. Hager (2007–2008)
- Jeff Frederick (2008–2009)
- Pat Mullins (2009–2015)
- John Whitbeck (2015–2018)
- Jack Wilson (2018–2020)
- Rich Anderson (2020–2025)
- Mark Peake (2025–present)

== Recent elections ==
=== 2016 elections ===
Over one million voters participated in the 2016 Virginia Republican presidential primary. Donald Trump placed first with 35% of the vote, followed by Marco Rubio (32%), Ted Cruz (17%), John Kasich (10%), and Ben Carson (6%). The party held its quadrennial convention in Roanoke and elected 13 at-large delegates to the Republican National Convention, 10 of which pledged to support Ted Cruz in the event of a contested convention. In the general election, Democratic presidential nominee Hillary Clinton defeated Donald Trump 50% to 45%.

In the 2016 United States House of Representatives elections in Virginia, the Republicans lost one seat but maintained a 7–4 majority in their representative delegation.

=== 2017 elections ===
In 2017, the party nominated Ed Gillespie for governor, Jill Vogel for lieutenant governor, and John Adams for attorney general via an open primary. All three lost to their Democratic opponents. Gillespie lost to Ralph Northam by a margin of 8.93%.

The Republican Party lost 15 seats in the 2017 Virginia House of Delegates election. This resulted in the Republicans going from a 66–34 majority to a 51–49 majority in the Virginia House of Delegates.

=== 2018 elections ===
In 2018, incumbent Democratic senator Tim Kaine defeated Republican Corey Stewart by a margin of 16% in the 2018 United States Senate election in Virginia. The party also lost three seats in the House of Representatives elections, giving Democrats a 7–4 majority.

=== 2019 elections ===
In 2019, the party lost their majorities in the House of Delegates and State Senate. Democrats gained two seats in the 2019 Virginia Senate election, giving them a 21–19 majority. Democrats gained six seats in the 2019 Virginia House of Delegates election, giving them a 55–45 majority.

=== 2020 elections ===
In 2020, Democratic presidential nominee Joe Biden defeated incumbent President Donald Trump by 10.11%. Both parties maintained their seats in the 2020 United States House of Representatives elections in Virginia. Incumbent Democratic senator Mark Warner defeated Republican challenger Daniel Gade by 12.1% in the 2020 United States Senate election in Virginia.

=== 2021 elections ===
In 2021, Republican nominee Glenn Youngkin defeated former governor Terry McAuliffe by a 51%–48.5% margin. The GOP nominees for Lieutenant Governor, Winsome Sears, and Attorney General, Jason Miyares, also won their respective races. This was the first time Republicans won a statewide election in the Commonwealth since 2009. The party gained seven seats in the House of Delegates to have a majority of 52–48, with Todd Gilbert as the new Speaker of the House. These races were seen as a crucial bellwether for the 2022 midterms, as they took place during a period of low approval for President Joe Biden.

=== 2023 elections ===
In 2023, the party lost their majority again in the House of Delegates and failed to win a majority in the State Senate, blocking Governor Youngkin's abilities to pass a more conservative agenda.

== Controversies ==
=== Controversies surrounding the 2020 presidential election ===
Prior to the January 6 joint session of the United States Congress to certify Joe Biden's win, Republican Delegates Dave LaRock (Loudon), Mark Cole (Fauquier), and Ronnie Campbell (R-Lexington) sent a letter to Vice President Mike Pence urging him to nullify Virginia's electoral results. Democratic Speaker of the House Elieen Filler-Corn punished the members by stripping them of their committee assignments.

Republican 2021 candidate for Governor Sen. Amanda Chase attended the rally prior to the January 6 storming of the United States Capitol. After the riot that left one person dead, party chairman Rich Anderson said in a statement "I and Virginia Republicans across our great Commonwealth condemn these despicable acts without reservation or hesitation."

Democratic Party of Virginia Chairwoman Susan Swecker quickly condemned the Republican officials, saying "The Republican Party has made their disdain for democracy clear, and every elected GOP official has been complicit."

=== Method of nomination for 2021 elections ===
In December 2020, the State Central Committee voted to choose its candidates for Governor, Lieutenant Governor, and Attorney General by convention, not by a primary. Candidate Sen. Amanda Chase threatened to run as an independent, but quickly backtracked and said she would reluctantly participate in a convention. The State Central Committee has held several meetings to reconsider the decision to hold a convention.

=== "Ghetto" statements ===
At a January 2021 State Central Committee meeting, Party Chairman Rich Anderson called the Party Headquarters in Richmond a "literal ghetto". Democrats and other Republicans criticized him for the choice of words, while he defended himself by pointing out that "ghetto has nothing to do with race" and that he had only been referring to the building, not the neighborhood."

== See also ==
- Democratic Party of Virginia
- Green Party of Virginia
- Libertarian Party of Virginia
- Republican Party of Virginia convention, 2013

== Works cited ==
- Abbott, Richard (1986). The Republican Party and the South, 1855-1877: The First Southern Strategy. University of North Carolina Press. ISBN 0807816809.
- Lowe, Richard (1973). "The Republican Party in Antebellum Virginia, 1856-1860". The Virginia Magazine of History and Biography. 81 (3). Virginia Historical Society: 259–79. JSTOR 4247810.
