= Richard D. Obenshain =

American politician (1935–1978)

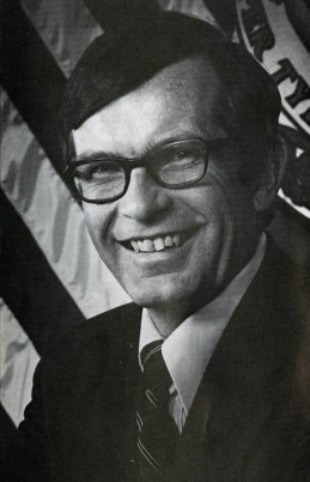
- Obenshain in 1978
- Born: Richard Dudley Obenshain; October 31, 1935; Abingdon, Virginia, U.S.
- Died: August 2, 1978 (aged 42); Chesterfield County, Virginia, U.S.
- Education: J.D., New York University School of Law, Bridgewater College
- Occupations: Attorney and politician
- Political party: Republican
- Spouse: Helen W. Obenshain (m. 1971)
- Children: Mark (b. 1962); Anne Scott; Kate (b. 1969)
- Relatives: Chris (nephew)

Richard Dudley Obenshain (October 31, 1935 – August 2, 1978) was an American politician and attorney. Obenshain had served as the chairman of the Republican Party of Virginia and was nominated in 1978 to run as the Republican nominee for the United States Senate but died prior to the election.

== Biography ==
Obenshain was the son of Josephine (Dudley) and Samuel S. Obenshain (1904–2000), a professor at Virginia Tech in Blacksburg, Virginia, where he grew up. The elder Obenshain was active in Virginia's Republican Party during the era of the Byrd Organization, the Democratic machine of Harry F. Byrd.

Richard graduated from Bridgewater College in Rockingham County, Virginia, and was admitted to the Virginia Bar. He was a delegate to the Republican National Convention in 1964. In that same year, he ran for the House of Representatives in Virginia's 3rd congressional district based in Richmond, facing Democratic State Delegate David E. Satterfield III. Obenshain nearly ended the long run of Democratic dominance in the district, losing by only 654 votes. He nearly won on the strength of Barry Goldwater carrying the district; Goldwater won every county-level jurisdiction in the district except for the city of Richmond. However, Republicans had been making inroads among Byrd Democrats for some time before then. As early as the 1930s, several Byrd Democrats had begun splitting their tickets for national elections due to the increasingly liberal bent of the national party.

Obenshain was the unsuccessful Republican candidate for Attorney General in 1969, and in 1972, successfully challenged Warren B. French to become Chairman of the Virginia Republican Party.

By this time, the Byrd Organization had lost its grip on state politics. In 1966 two longtime Byrd stalwarts, Senator A. Willis Robertson and Congressman Howard W. Smith, were ousted by more liberal primary challengers, and Byrd's son, Harry Jr., barely survived a primary challenge for the right to finish out his father's sixth term. Despite this and Byrd Democrats' growing willingness to split their tickets, the GOP was still all but nonexistent at the state and local level. Well into the 1990s, Democrats still held most local offices and dominated the Virginia General Assembly. Under Obenshain's leadership, however, a record number of Republicans were elected to the General Assembly, the first such major gains since Reconstruction in the late 19th century following the American Civil War.

In the summer of 1978, Obenshain won his party's nomination to run for the U.S. Senate to replace retiring William L. Scott. On the night of August 2, at approximately 11:00 pm the small twin-engine Piper PA-34 Seneca airplane carrying him home from a campaign appearance crashed in trees while attempting a night-time landing at the Chesterfield County Airport, a general aviation facility near Richmond. Killed along with the 42-year-old candidate were pilot Richard Neel and a flight instructor. Former U.S. Secretary of the Navy John Warner was selected to replace Obenshain as the party's nominee for the U.S. Senate race. Warner won in November, and went on to hold the seat for 30 years.

== Family ==
In 2003, two of Richard Obenshain's children enjoyed major successes in Virginia politics. First, his daughter, Kate Obenshain of Winchester, became the first woman to head the Republican Party of Virginia. Coincidentally, her opponent was state Republican party treasurer Richard Neel Jr., an Alexandria lawyer whose father was the pilot who died in the same crash as Richard Obenshain. Then, in November, Obenshain's son, Mark Obenshain, an attorney based in Harrisonburg, was elected to the Virginia State Senate from the 26th district. He was the 2013 Republican nominee for Attorney General of Virginia. His nephew, Chris Obenshain, was elected to the Virginia House of Delegates in 2023.

== Legacy ==
According to an article in the Virginian-Pilot newspaper, Obenshain's political legacy was "skill at birthing an alliance of Republicans and conservative Democrats, his prescient support of Ronald Reagan and bold tax cuts, and his tireless crusade to curb Democratic dominance in the state."

In Richmond, the state headquarters of the Republican Party of Virginia is named "The Richard D. Obenshain Center" in his honor.

The most important goal in my life is to have some significant impact in preserving personal freedom in the life of this country.

Richard D. Obenshain

According to Virginia State Senator Mark Obenshain (R-26), the above statement is slightly misquoted and should read as the following:

The most important goal in my life is to have some significant impact in preserving and expanding the realm of personal freedom in the life of this country.

Richard D. Obenshain

Party political offices
Preceded by William L. Scott	Republican nominee for U.S. Senator from Virginia (Class 2); 1978	Succeeded by John Warner
