= Kate Obenshain =

American journalist

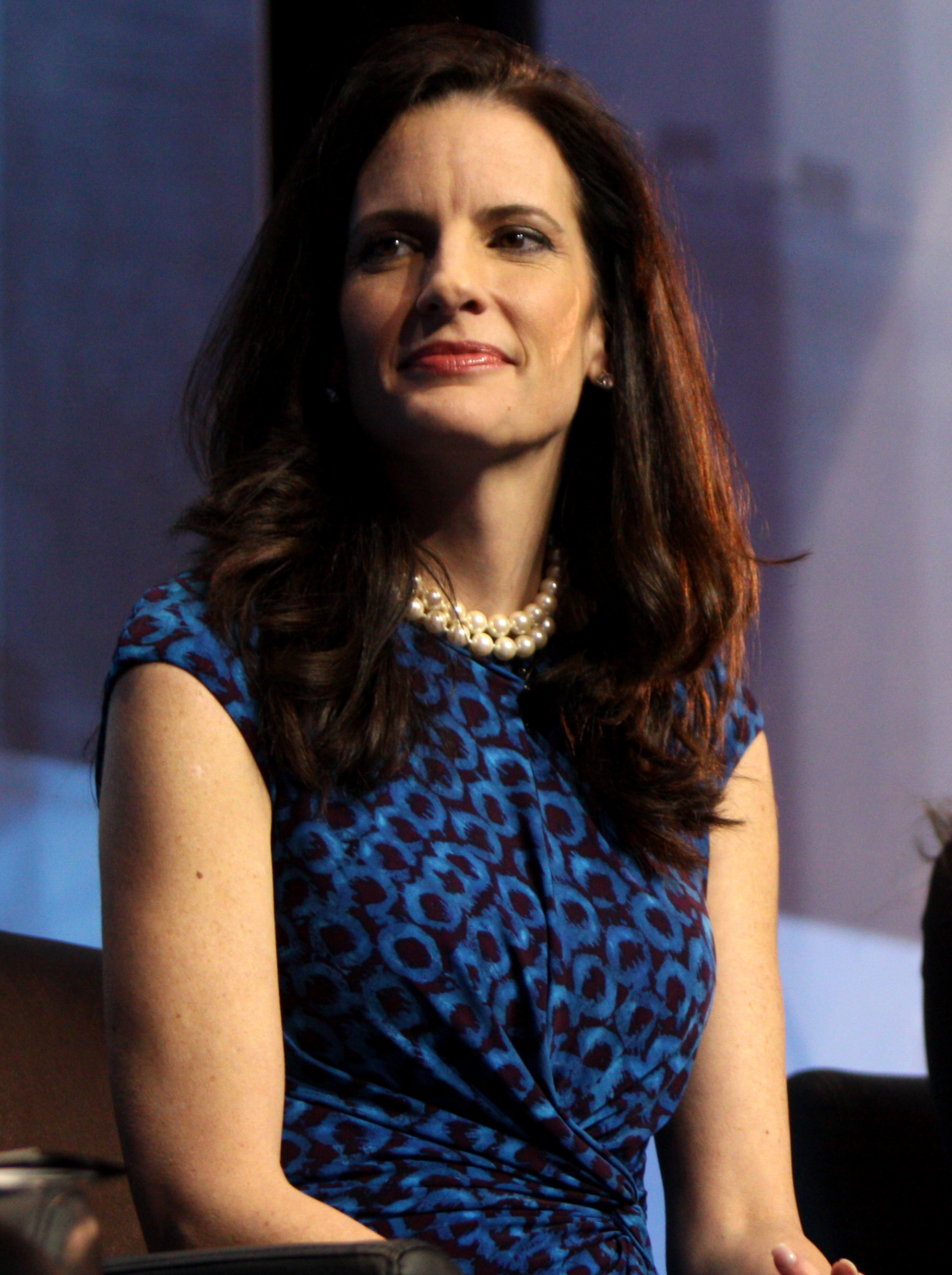
- Obenshain in 2013

Chair of the Virginia Republican Party
- In office September 7, 2003 – November 15, 2006
- Preceded by: Gary R. Thomson
- Succeeded by: Ed Gillespie

Personal details
- Born: 1969 (age 56–57) Richmond, Virginia, U.S.
- Party: Republican
- Parent: Richard D. Obenshain (father)
- Relatives: Mark Obenshain (brother); Chris Obenshain (cousin)
- Education: University of Virginia
- Occupation: Journalist and politician

Kate Obenshain (born November 14, 1968) is an American journalist and politician. She is a conservative political commentator, who formerly served as Vice President of the Young America's Foundation. She regularly appears as a guest on the Fox News Channel.

== Education/career ==
Obenshain is a graduate of the University of Virginia where she was editor of the campus conservative newspaper, The Virginia Advocate.

== Political experience ==
From 1995 to 2000, Obenshain served as an appointee of Governors George Allen and Jim Gilmore on the State Council of Higher Education for Virginia, implementing each governor's vision for budgetary reform and program accountability.

She also served as the first woman chairman of the Republican Party of Virginia from 2003 to 2006. She was elected party chair on September 7, 2003 after incumbent chair Gary R. Thomson resigned after pleading guilty in federal court to a misdemeanor. She stepped down from that post on November 15, 2006, following the 2006 midterm elections to serve as Senator George Allen's Chief of Staff for the remainder of his term in the U.S. Senate following the Senator's loss.

As state GOP chair, she garnered national attention for her active opposition against tax increases and the expanding role of government at the state and national levels. During her tenure, she was referred to by The Atlanta Journal-Constitution as one of the rising stars in the GOP.

== Speaking on college campuses ==
Obenshain is a campus speaker for both the Clare Boothe Luce Policy Institute and Young America's Foundation.

She has spoken on college campuses for eighteen years on such topics as "The New Face of Feminism: It’s Wearing Lipstick," "Our Descent into Liberalism," and "America’s Noble Heritage: Hope from the Founding Fathers." Kate speaks across the nation on a wide variety of issues including life, national security, education, economic policy, political correctness on campus, and the changing role of women in public policy.

== Family and personal life ==
Obenshain is the daughter of former party chair and 1978 U.S. Senate candidate Richard D. Obenshain.

Her brother, Mark Obenshain, is a member of the Virginia State Senate and her cousin, Chris Obenshain, was a member of the Virginia House of Delegates.

She is a Virginia native and currently resides in Charlottesville, Virginia.

She filed for divorce from her former husband Phillip in 2006.

== Other achievements ==
Obenshain serves as a member of the Board of Directors of the Clare Boothe Luce Policy Institute.

She is a co-founder of James 1:27 Foundation, a conservative non-profit organization.

Obenshain has been featured in the 2006, 2007, 2008, 2009, and 2010 Great American Conservative Women Calendars.

Her work is featured in the book Great American Conservative Women.
