= 1978 United States Senate election in Virginia =

- November 7, 1978
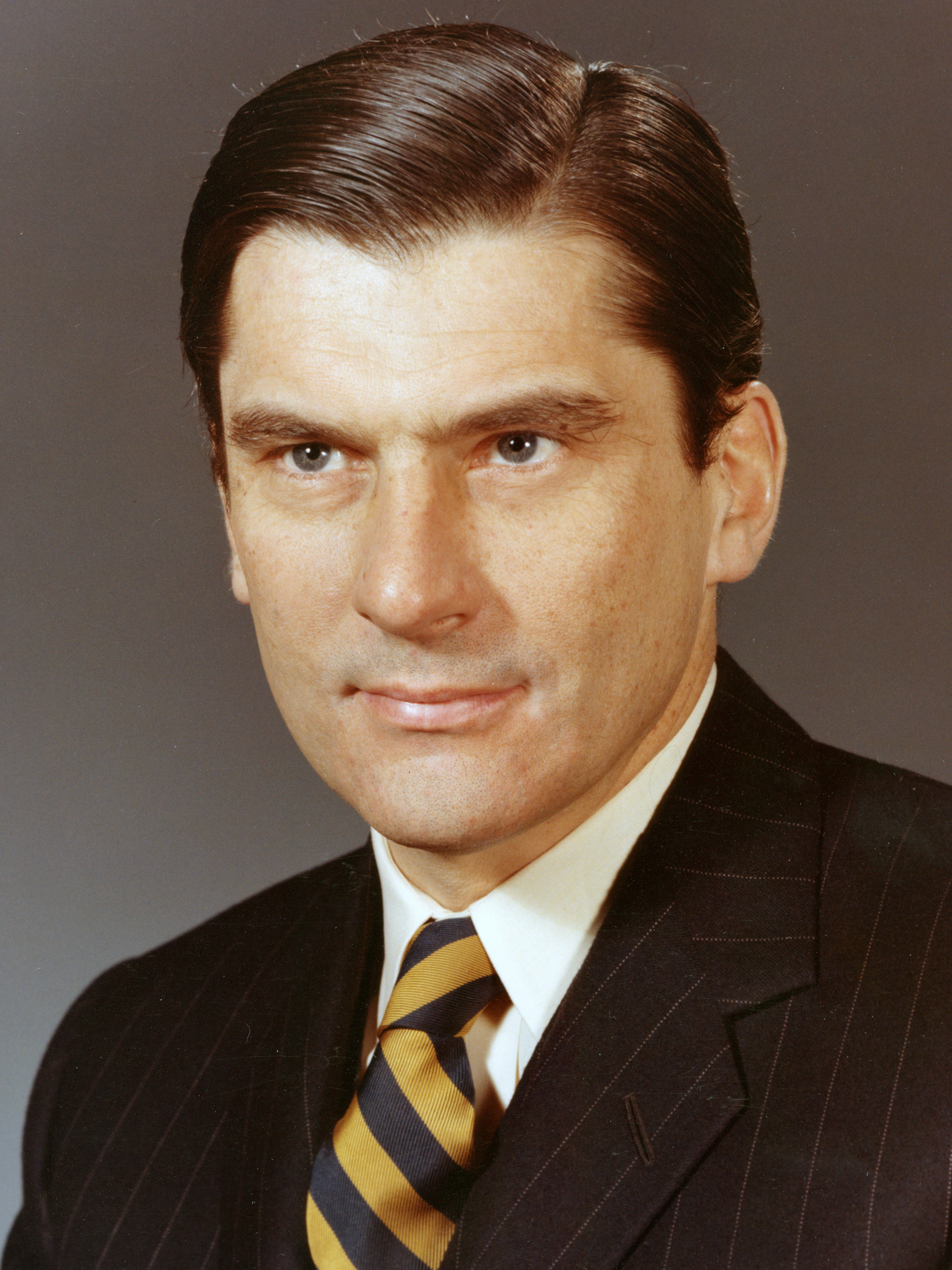

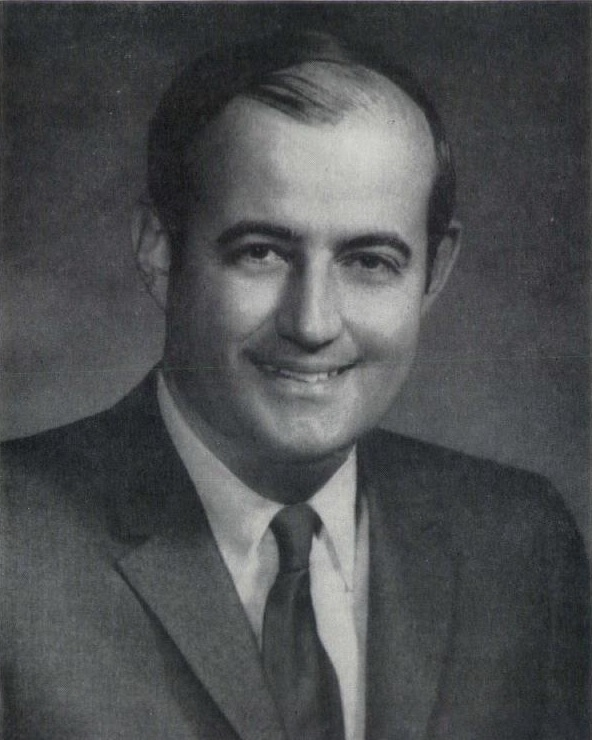
| Nominee | John Warner (Replacing Richard D. Obenshain) | Andrew P. Miller |
| Party | Republican | Democratic |
| Popular vote | 613,232 | 608,511 |
| Percentage | 50.17% | 49.79% |
- County and independent city results Warner: 50–60% 60–70% Miller: 50–60% 60–70% 70–80%
U.S. senator before election
William Lloyd Scott
Republican
Elected U.S. Senator
John Warner
Republican

The 1978 United States Senate election in Virginia was held on November 7, 1978. Incumbent Republican Senator William L. Scott did not run for re-election to a second term. Republican former Secretary of the Navy John Warner narrowly defeated Democratic Attorney General of Virginia Andrew P. Miller to succeed him. Originally, this election was a match between Republican Richard Obenshain and Miller, then Obenshain died in a plane crash, leaving the party in disarray. Warner was then nominated to run in Obenshain's place, and his victorious election thrust him into a thirty-year career in the United States Senate, which started with this election.

== Republican nomination ==
=== Candidates ===
- Linwood Holton, former Governor of Virginia (1970–1974) and U.S. Assistant Secretary of State for Legislative Affairs (1974–1975)
- Nathan H. Miller, State Senator from Harrisonburg
- Richard D. Obenshain, Chairman of the Virginia Republican Party since 1972 and nominee for Attorney General in 1969
- John Warner, former United States Secretary of the Navy

=== Convention ===
1978 Virginia Republican Convention
| Ballot | 1 | 2 | 3 | 4 | 5 | 6 |
|---|---|---|---|---|---|---|
| Obenshain | 1,192 | 1,261 | 1,338 | 1,521 | 1,516 | 1,580 |
| Warner | 853 | 908 | 996 | 1,338 | 1,393 | 1,474 |
| Holton | 780 | 751 | 620 | 0 | 0 | 0 |
| Miller | 262 | 160 | 122 | 201 | 166 | 0 |

Obenshain's victory set up the general election as a rematch of the 1969 Attorney General race between him and Andrew P. Miller, the Democratic nominee who defeated Obenshain in 1969.

=== Aftermath ===
On August 2, Obenshain died in a twin-engine plane crash, effectively shaking up this election. He was then replaced by Warner after other recruits turned down the chance to be nominated in respect for Obenshain.

== General election ==
=== Candidates ===
- Andrew P. Miller, Attorney General of Virginia (Democratic)
- John Warner, former United States Secretary of the Navy (Republican)

=== Results ===
United States Senate election in Virginia, 1978
| Party | Candidate | Votes | % | ±% |
|---|---|---|---|---|
| Republican | John Warner | 613,232 | 50.17% | −1.28% |
| Democratic | Andrew P. Miller | 608,511 | 49.79% | +3.67% |
| Write-ins | | 513 | 0.04% | +0.04% |
| Majority | | 4,721 | 0.39% | −4.94% |
| Turnout | | 1,222,256 | | |
| Republican hold | | | | |

== See also ==
- 1978 United States Senate elections
