= Harry Byrd (disambiguation) =

Harry Byrd may refer to:

- Harry F. Byrd (1887–1966), American politician
- Curley Byrd (Harry Clifton Byrd, 1889–1970), American politician, university president, multi-sport athlete and coach
- Harry F. Byrd Jr. (1914–2013), American politician, son of Harry F. Byrd Sr.
- Harry Byrd (baseball) (1925–1985), American Major League Baseball pitcher
- Harry Byrd of Virginia, a 1996 non-fiction book by Ronald L. Heinemann, concerning Harry F. Byrd

== See also ==
- Professor Longhair, also known as Henry Byrd, American singer and pianist
- Henry Byrd (American football)
- Henry Bird (disambiguation)
- Dickie Bird (Harold Dennis Bird, born 1933), cricket umpire
