= WWR =

WWR may refer to:

- The World as Will and Representation by Arthur Schopenhauer
- World Wheelchair Rugby
- Westwater Resources
- WWR, the IATA and FAA LID code for West Woodward Airport, Oklahoma, United States
- WWR, the National Rail station code for Wandsworth Road railway station, London, England
