= 1966 United States Senate election in Virginia =

- November 8, 1966
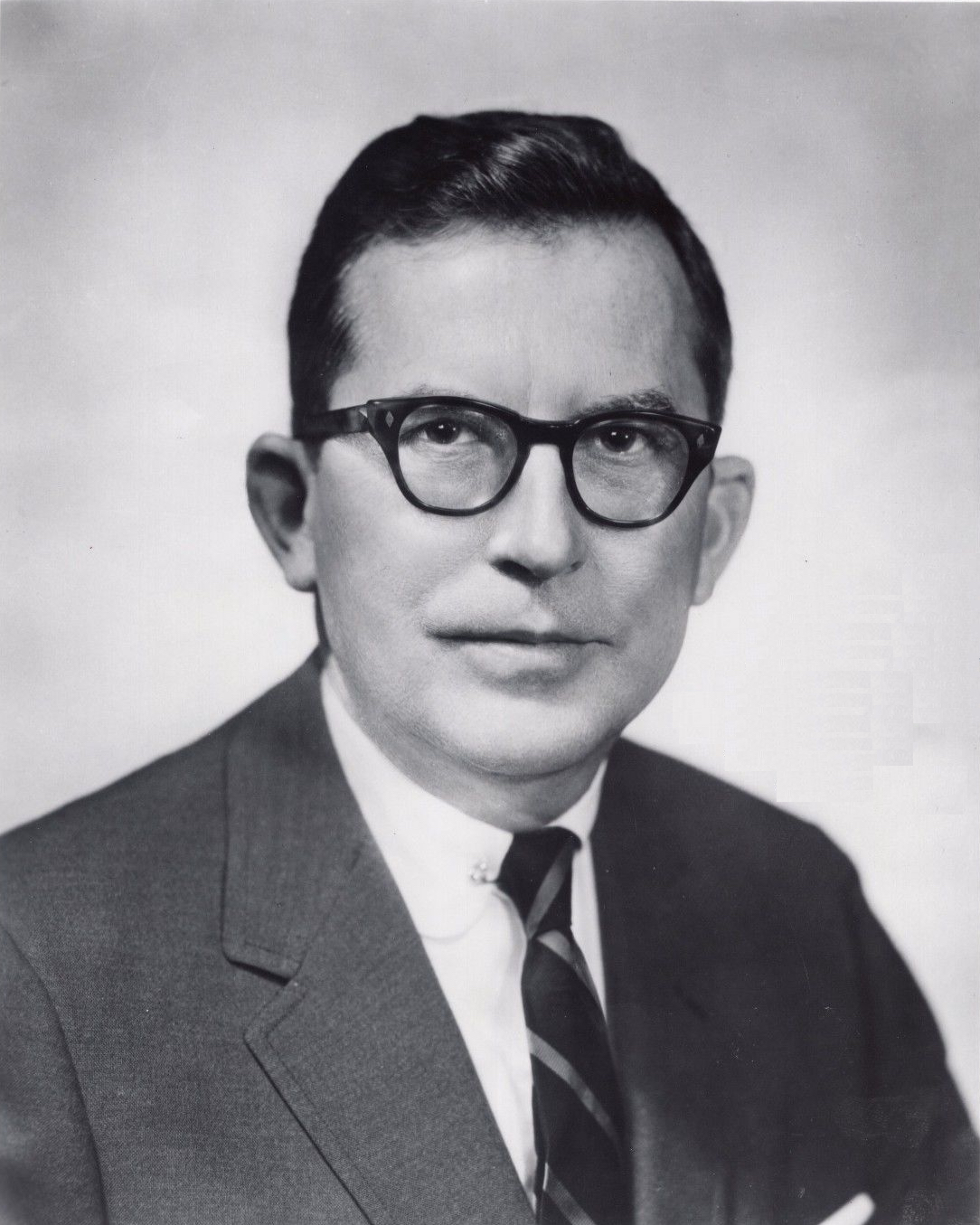

Nominee	William Spong Jr.	James P. Ould Jr.	F. Lee Hawthorne
Party	Democratic	Republican	Conservative
Popular vote	429,855	245,681	58,251
Percentage	58.57%	33.48%	7.94%
- County and independent city results Spong: 30–40% 40–50% 50–60% 60–70% 70–80% 80–90% Ould: 40–50% 50–60% 60–70% 70–80%
U.S. senator before election
A. Willis Robertson
Democratic
Elected U.S. Senator
William B. Spong Jr.
Democratic

The 1966 United States Senate election in Virginia was held on November 8, 1966. Democratic incumbent A. Willis Robertson ran for re-election to a fourth term in office but was defeated in the Democratic primary by state senator William B. Spong Jr. Spong defeated Republican James Ould and Conservative F. Lee Hawthorne in the general election.

This was the last time a Democrat won the Class II Senate seat from Virginia until 2008, and along with the special election for Virginia's other seat held on the same day, the last time the Democratic Party won either seat until 1988.

== Democratic primary ==
=== Candidates ===
- A. Willis Robertson, incumbent Senator since 1946
- William Spong Jr., state senator from Portsmouth

=== Campaign ===
Robertson had long been one of the most conservative members of the Democratic Party and had opposed most civil rights legislation. To secure his defeat, President Lyndon B. Johnson personally recruited Spong, a much more liberal member of the party, to challenge Robertson in the Democratic primary. The decaying Byrd machine was unsure about supporting the aging Robertson, with some members favoring younger U.S. representative Thomas N. Downing. Nevertheless, fears that Downing's supporters would not rally behind Byrd lead the organization to stand with Robertson as its candidate for the primary.

Spong relied on support from Black voters who were newly enfranchised by the Voting Rights Act of 1965 and the declining power of such Byrd Democrats as Sidney Kellam of Virginia Beach. He was also helped by Robertson's age and overconfidence amongst his supporters, which may explain why Harry F. Byrd Jr. won the simultaneous primary for his father's seat, whereas Robertson lost.

=== Results ===
Results by county and independent city Spong: 50–60% 60–70% 70–80% 80–90% Robertson: 50–60% 60–70% 70–80% 80–90% Tie: 50%

1966 Democratic U.S. Senate primary
Party	Candidate	Votes	%
Democratic	William B. Spong Jr.	216,885	50.07%
Democratic	A. Willis Robertson (incumbent)	216,274	49.93%
Write-in		1	0.00%
Total votes		433,160	100.00%

Spong's extremely narrow victory was received as a major upset and, alongside Harry F. Byrd Jr.'s narrow victory in the simultaneous special election primary over Armistead L. Boothe, an end to the Byrd machine's dominance over the Virginia Democratic Party. Spong was helped by the fact that many conservative voters had already turned to the Republican or Virginia Conservative parties after the 1965 gubernatorial election and did not vote in the Democratic primary.

==== Primary results by county and independent city ====
1966 Virginia Senate Democratic primary by county or independent city
	Absalom Willis Robertson Democratic		William Belser Spong Jr. Democratic		Margin		Total votes cast
	#	%	#	%	#	%	Total votes cast
Accomack County	1,790	51.70%	1,672	48.30%	118	3.41%	3,462
Albemarle County	1,599	55.81%	1,266	44.19%	333	11.62%	2,865
Alleghany County	442	62.87%	261	37.13%	181	25.75%	703
Amelia County	909	66.11%	466	33.89%	443	32.22%	1,375
Amherst County	1,291	70.20%	548	29.80%	743	40.40%	1,839
Appomattox County	2,556	85.34%	439	14.66%	2,117	70.68%	2,995
Arlington County	6,113	34.53%	11,591	65.47%	-5,478	-30.94%	17,704
Augusta County	1,415	69.16%	631	30.84%	784	38.32%	2,046
Bath County	262	81.62%	59	18.38%	203	63.24%	321
Bedford County	1,615	73.85%	572	26.15%	1,043	47.69%	2,187
Bland County	254	60.05%	169	39.95%	85	20.09%	423
Botetourt County	588	59.76%	396	40.24%	192	19.51%	984
Brunswick County	1,776	61.03%	1,134	38.97%	642	22.06%	2,910
Buchanan County	499	31.36%	1,092	68.64%	-593	-37.27%	1,591
Buckingham County	1,578	77.81%	450	22.19%	1,128	55.62%	2,028
Campbell County	1,730	74.70%	586	25.30%	1,144	49.40%	2,316
Caroline County	873	49.94%	875	50.06%	-2	-0.11%	1,748
Carroll County	166	20.72%	635	79.28%	-469	-58.55%	801
Charles City County	222	23.20%	735	76.80%	-513	-53.61%	957
Charlotte County	1,323	77.01%	395	22.99%	928	54.02%	1,718
Chesterfield County	4,837	64.02%	2,718	35.98%	2,119	28.05%	7,555
Clarke County	911	65.49%	480	34.51%	431	30.98%	1,391
Craig County	133	53.85%	114	46.15%	19	7.69%	247
Culpeper County	1,430	69.38%	631	30.62%	799	38.77%	2,061
Cumberland County	943	58.32%	674	41.68%	269	16.64%	1,617
Dickenson County	688	45.56%	822	54.44%	-134	-8.87%	1,510
Dinwiddie County	1,887	67.13%	924	32.87%	963	34.26%	2,811
Essex County	594	63.46%	342	36.54%	252	26.92%	936
Fairfax County	8,531	30.06%	19,848	69.94%	-11,317	-39.88%	28,379
Fauquier County	2,076	63.70%	1,183	36.30%	893	27.40%	3,259
Floyd County	144	50.00%	144	50.00%	0	0.00%	288
Fluvanna County	453	76.78%	137	23.22%	316	53.56%	590
Franklin County	1,174	59.26%	807	40.74%	367	18.53%	1,981
Frederick County	1,647	68.03%	774	31.97%	873	36.06%	2,421
Giles County	517	47.61%	569	52.39%	-52	-4.79%	1,086
Gloucester County	798	59.95%	533	40.05%	265	19.91%	1,331
Goochland County	1,265	60.15%	838	39.85%	427	20.30%	2,103
Grayson County	381	38.72%	603	61.28%	-222	-22.56%	984
Greene County	126	61.17%	80	38.83%	46	22.33%	206
Greensville County	1,595	54.79%	1,316	45.21%	279	9.58%	2,911
Halifax County	2,163	77.22%	638	22.78%	1,525	54.44%	2,801
Hanover County	2,348	66.72%	1,171	33.28%	1,177	33.45%	3,519
Henrico County	11,288	66.44%	5,701	33.56%	5,587	32.89%	16,989
Henry County	928	51.84%	862	48.16%	66	3.69%	1,790
Highland County	203	89.04%	25	10.96%	178	78.07%	228
Isle of Wight County	909	45.04%	1,109	54.96%	-200	-9.91%	2,018
James City County	555	52.01%	512	47.99%	43	4.03%	1,067
King and Queen County	446	51.44%	421	48.56%	25	2.88%	867
King George County	452	55.39%	364	44.61%	88	10.78%	816
King William County	718	60.39%	471	39.61%	247	20.77%	1,189
Lancaster County	1,525	74.83%	513	25.17%	1,012	49.66%	2,038
Lee County	200	10.32%	1,738	89.68%	-1,538	-79.36%	1,938
Loudoun County	1,949	59.77%	1,312	40.23%	637	19.53%	3,261
Louisa County	1,410	67.53%	678	32.47%	732	35.06%	2,088
Lunenburg County	1,178	63.50%	677	36.50%	501	27.01%	1,855
Madison County	496	71.68%	196	28.32%	300	43.35%	692
Mathews County	575	64.10%	322	35.90%	253	28.21%	897
Mecklenburg County	2,189	68.30%	1,016	31.70%	1,173	36.60%	3,205
Middlesex County	428	69.03%	192	30.97%	236	38.06%	620
Montgomery County	882	56.72%	673	43.28%	209	13.44%	1,555
Nansemond County	1,512	39.56%	2,310	60.44%	-798	-20.88%	3,822
Nelson County	705	71.50%	281	28.50%	424	43.00%	986
New Kent County	328	44.87%	403	55.13%	-75	-10.26%	731
Northampton County	993	68.06%	466	31.94%	527	36.12%	1,459
Northumberland County	759	54.96%	622	45.04%	137	9.92%	1,381
Nottoway County	1,695	66.50%	854	33.50%	841	32.99%	2,549
Orange County	1,017	66.73%	507	33.27%	510	33.46%	1,524
Page County	1,261	79.61%	323	20.39%	938	59.22%	1,584
Patrick County	612	44.80%	754	55.20%	-142	-10.40%	1,366
Pittsylvania County	3,411	62.91%	2,011	37.09%	1,400	25.82%	5,422
Powhatan County	583	54.18%	493	45.82%	90	8.36%	1,076
Prince Edward County	2,127	63.74%	1,210	36.26%	917	27.48%	3,337
Prince George County	980	55.65%	781	44.35%	199	11.30%	1,761
Prince William County	2,505	55.18%	2,035	44.82%	470	10.35%	4,540
Pulaski County	763	41.40%	1,080	58.60%	-317	-17.20%	1,843
Rappahannock County	816	79.77%	207	20.23%	609	59.53%	1,023
Richmond County	589	66.25%	300	33.75%	289	32.51%	889
Roanoke County	2,213	59.49%	1,507	40.51%	706	18.98%	3,720
Rockbridge County	906	78.24%	252	21.76%	654	56.48%	1,158
Rockingham County	1,138	67.14%	557	32.86%	581	34.28%	1,695
Russell County	523	29.99%	1,221	70.01%	-698	-40.02%	1,744
Scott County	284	21.93%	1,011	78.07%	-727	-56.14%	1,295
Shenandoah County	1,430	77.72%	410	22.28%	1,020	55.43%	1,840
Smyth County	539	37.75%	889	62.25%	-350	-24.51%	1,428
Southampton County	1,272	55.40%	1,024	44.60%	248	10.80%	2,296
Spotsylvania County	1,130	46.69%	1,290	53.31%	-160	-6.61%	2,420
Stafford County	1,187	44.04%	1,508	55.96%	-321	-11.91%	2,695
Surry County	843	52.46%	764	47.54%	79	4.92%	1,607
Sussex County	1,686	66.88%	835	33.12%	851	33.76%	2,521
Tazewell County	770	47.71%	844	52.29%	-74	-4.58%	1,614
Warren County	1,246	58.55%	882	41.45%	364	17.11%	2,128
Washington County	929	42.21%	1,272	57.79%	-343	-15.58%	2,201
Westmoreland County	868	55.96%	683	44.04%	185	11.93%	1,551
Wise County	1,471	50.24%	1,457	49.76%	14	0.48%	2,928
Wythe County	650	46.26%	755	53.74%	-105	-7.47%	1,405
York County	1,206	53.10%	1,065	46.90%	141	6.21%	2,271
Alexandria City	3,870	35.02%	7,180	64.98%	-3,310	-29.95%	11,050
Bristol City	556	38.40%	892	61.60%	-336	-23.20%	1,448
Buena Vista City	416	79.24%	109	20.76%	307	58.48%	525
Charlottesville City	2,123	46.49%	2,444	53.51%	-321	-7.03%	4,567
Chesapeake City	4,820	43.44%	6,277	56.56%	-1,457	-13.13%	11,097
Clifton Forge City	401	69.26%	178	30.74%	223	38.51%	579
Colonial Heights City	1,478	80.02%	369	19.98%	1,109	60.04%	1,847
Covington City	575	59.28%	395	40.72%	180	18.56%	970
Danville City	2,691	60.01%	1,793	39.99%	898	20.03%	4,484
Fairfax City	773	36.39%	1,351	63.61%	-578	-27.21%	2,124
Falls Church City	441	31.34%	966	68.66%	-525	-37.31%	1,407
Franklin City	536	55.66%	427	44.34%	109	11.32%	963
Fredericksburg City	1,406	45.17%	1,707	54.83%	-301	-9.67%	3,113
Galax City	182	40.27%	270	59.73%	-88	-19.47%	452
Hampton City	5,335	50.50%	5,229	49.49%	106	1.00%	10,565 (Note: One write-in vote was recorded from this county or city.)
Harrisonburg City	844	70.22%	358	29.78%	486	40.43%	1,202
Hopewell City	1,376	56.05%	1,079	43.95%	297	12.10%	2,455
Lexington City	662	68.32%	307	31.68%	355	36.64%	969
Lynchburg City	3,188	59.30%	2,188	40.70%	1,000	18.60%	5,376
Martinsville City	811	49.72%	820	50.28%	-9	-0.55%	1,631
Newport News City	6,313	49.33%	6,484	50.67%	-171	-1.34%	12,797
Norfolk City	9,773	33.76%	19,175	66.24%	-9,402	-32.48%	28,948
Norton City	151	34.79%	283	65.21%	-132	-30.41%	434
Petersburg City	2,723	46.55%	3,126	53.45%	-403	-6.89%	5,849
Portsmouth City	4,460	26.79%	12,187	73.21%	-7,727	-46.42%	16,647
Radford City	334	50.76%	324	49.24%	10	1.52%	658
Richmond City	14,628	46.87%	16,579	53.13%	-1,951	-6.25%	31,207
Roanoke City	4,135	54.96%	3,388	45.04%	747	9.93%	7,523
South Boston City	599	79.65%	153	20.35%	446	59.31%	752
Staunton City	1,356	66.47%	684	33.53%	672	32.94%	2,040
Suffolk City	997	54.69%	826	45.31%	171	9.38%	1,823
Virginia Beach City	6,396	42.77%	8,560	57.23%	-2,164	-14.47%	14,956
Waynesboro City	740	59.06%	513	40.94%	227	18.12%	1,253
Williamsburg City	470	45.76%	557	54.24%	-87	-8.47%	1,027
Winchester City	1,795	70.70%	744	29.30%	1,051	41.39%	2,539
Totals	216,274	49.93%	216,885	50.07%	-611	-0.14%	433,160

== General election ==
=== Candidates ===
- F. Lee Hawthorne (Conservative)
- James P. Ould Jr., mayor of Lynchburg (Republican)
- William Spong Jr., state senator from Portsmouth (Democratic)

=== Campaign ===
This was the first time since 1948 that the Republicans nominated a candidate for the seat. James P. Ould was mayor of Lynchburg and ran an essentially conservative campaign against the moderately progressive Spong. He was less successful by about 4 percent than the lesser-known Lawrence Traylor in the concurrent election for the state's other Senate seat.

The Virginia Conservative Party was formed by hard-line Byrd Democrats who believed that the pay-as-you-go political system must be reinforced and federal control eliminated throughout the state. Support by several leaders of the machine for Lyndon Johnson in the 1964 presidential election – most critically future party-switching two-time Governor Mills Godwin – angered this group and led it away from even the conservative state Democratic Party. Both Conservative Senate candidates devoted their campaigns to attacking the major parties for refusing to debate such issues as the supposed takeover of schools, inflation due to the War on Poverty, and judicial appointments that the Conservatives believed responsible for the crime wave of the 1960s.

=== Results ===
1966 United States Senate election in Virginia
Party	Candidate	Votes	%	±%
Democratic	William B. Spong Jr.	429,855	58.57%	▼22.70
Republican	James P. Ould, Jr.	245,681	33.48%	N/A
Conservative	F. Lee Hawthorne	58,251	7.94%	N/A
Write-in		92	0.01%	▼0.17
Majority		184,174	25.10%	−41.93%
Turnout		733,879		
Democratic hold				

==== Results by county or independent city ====
1966 United States Senate election in Virginia by county or independent city
	William Belser Spong Jr. Democratic		James P. Ould, Jr. Republican		F. Lee Hawthorne Virginia Conservative		Various candidates Write-ins		Margin		Total votes cast
	#	%	#	%	#	%	#	%	#	%	Total votes cast
Accomack County	2,819	65.93%	1,234	28.86%	221	5.17%	2	0.05%	1,585	37.07%	4,276
Albemarle County	2,539	55.91%	1,797	39.57%	201	4.43%	4	0.09%	742	16.34%	4,541
Alleghany County	974	56.33%	692	40.02%	63	3.64%			282	16.31%	1,729
Amelia County	1,070	57.47%	219	11.76%	572	30.72%	1	0.05%	498 (Note: In this county or city where Ould ran third behind Spong and Hawthorne, margin given is Spong vote minus Hawthorne vote and percentage margin Spong percentage minus Hawthorne percentage.)	26.75%	1,862
Amherst County	1,674	49.56%	995	29.46%	709	20.99%			679	20.10%	3,378
Appomattox County	2,147	72.29%	537	18.08%	277	9.33%	9	0.30%	1,610	54.21%	2,970
Arlington County	21,294	60.38%	12,176	34.53%	1,794	5.09%	1	0.00%	9,118	25.86%	35,265
Augusta County	2,731	45.32%	3,020	50.12%	275	4.56%			-289	-4.80%	6,026
Bath County	798	59.46%	501	37.33%	43	3.20%			297	22.13%	1,342
Bedford County	2,031	45.02%	1,536	34.05%	944	20.93%			495	10.97%	4,511
Bland County	741	52.04%	642	45.08%	41	2.88%			99	6.95%	1,424
Botetourt County	1,471	47.93%	1,493	48.65%	105	3.42%			-22	-0.72%	3,069
Brunswick County	1,802	52.60%	277	8.09%	1,347	39.32%			455	13.28%	3,426
Buchanan County	4,007	56.33%	2,806	39.44%	301	4.23%			1,201	16.88%	7,114
Buckingham County	1,755	76.01%	428	18.54%	126	5.46%			1,327	57.47%	2,309
Campbell County	1,990	39.34%	1,823	36.04%	1,245	24.61%			167	3.30%	5,058
Caroline County	2,306	73.96%	527	16.90%	285	9.14%			1,779	57.06%	3,118
Carroll County	1,356	27.94%	3,406	70.17%	92	1.90%			-2,050	-42.23%	4,854
Charles City County	1,206	86.89%	154	11.10%	28	2.02%			1,052	75.79%	1,388
Charlotte County	1,092	46.89%	490	21.04%	747	32.07%			345	14.81%	2,329
Chesterfield County	6,537	40.23%	5,960	36.67%	3,754	23.10%			577	3.55%	16,251
Clarke County	1,267	79.14%	309	19.30%	25	1.56%			958	59.84%	1,601
Craig County	393	46.56%	435	51.54%	16	1.90%			-42	-4.98%	844
Culpeper County	1,553	62.60%	844	34.02%	84	3.39%			709	28.58%	2,481
Cumberland County	1,005	58.60%	567	33.06%	143	8.34%			438	25.54%	1,715
Dickenson County	3,218	53.20%	2,687	44.42%	144	2.38%			531	8.78%	6,049
Dinwiddie County	2,185	69.56%	329	10.47%	627	19.96%			1,558	49.60%	3,141
Essex County	1,297	74.97%	335	19.36%	98	5.66%			962	55.61%	1,730
Fairfax County	36,472	59.59%	22,838	37.31%	1,898	3.10%	1	0.00%	13,634	22.27%	61,209
Fauquier County	3,272	75.32%	909	20.93%	163	3.75%			2,363	54.40%	4,344
Floyd County	617	31.56%	1,291	66.04%	47	2.40%			-674	-34.48%	1,955
Fluvanna County	654	52.40%	362	29.01%	232	18.59%			292	23.40%	1,248
Franklin County	1,830	58.41%	1,077	34.38%	226	7.21%			753	24.03%	3,133
Frederick County	2,430	65.43%	1,217	32.77%	67	1.80%			1,213	32.66%	3,714
Giles County	2,004	49.64%	1,904	47.16%	129	3.20%			100	2.48%	4,037
Gloucester County	1,225	59.49%	569	27.63%	265	12.87%			656	31.86%	2,059
Goochland County	1,727	66.99%	478	18.54%	370	14.35%	3	0.12%	1,249	48.45%	2,578
Grayson County	1,905	44.92%	2,254	53.15%	82	1.93%			-349	-8.23%	4,241
Greene County	320	41.45%	417	54.02%	35	4.53%			-97	-12.56%	772
Greensville County	2,123	56.16%	708	18.73%	948	25.08%	1	0.03%	1,175	31.08%	3,780
Halifax County	2,678	60.00%	970	21.73%	815	18.26%			1,708	38.27%	4,463
Hanover County	3,429	58.85%	1,854	31.82%	544	9.34%			1,575	27.03%	5,827
Henrico County	11,453	46.09%	10,609	42.70%	2,779	11.18%	7	0.03%	844	3.40%	24,848
Henry County	2,113	55.42%	1,406	36.87%	294	7.71%			707	18.54%	3,813
Highland County	352	45.30%	419	53.93%	6	0.77%			-67	-8.62%	777
Isle of Wight County	1,886	62.31%	463	15.30%	678	22.40%			1,208	39.91%	3,027
James City County	908	61.14%	440	29.63%	137	9.23%			468	31.52%	1,485
King and Queen County	1,181	78.58%	210	13.97%	112	7.45%			971	64.60%	1,503
King George County	1,119	69.85%	436	27.22%	46	2.87%	1	0.06%	683	42.63%	1,602
King William County	1,290	73.55%	343	19.56%	121	6.90%			947	53.99%	1,754
Lancaster County	1,519	61.50%	797	32.27%	154	6.23%			722	29.23%	2,470
Lee County	4,277	54.88%	3,349	42.97%	168	2.16%			928	11.91%	7,794
Loudoun County	3,531	69.17%	1,299	25.45%	275	5.39%			2,232	43.72%	5,105
Louisa County	1,894	64.60%	751	25.61%	287	9.79%			1,143	38.98%	2,932
Lunenburg County	1,447	54.32%	361	13.55%	856	32.13%			591	22.18%	2,664
Madison County	692	55.67%	516	41.51%	33	2.65%	2	0.16%	176	14.16%	1,243
Mathews County	780	55.79%	518	37.05%	100	7.15%			262	18.74%	1,398
Mecklenburg County	2,563	56.07%	877	19.19%	1,131	24.74%			1,432	31.33%	4,571
Middlesex County	657	57.18%	281	24.46%	211	18.36%			376	32.72%	1,149
Montgomery County	2,394	41.41%	3,199	55.34%	188	3.25%			-805	-13.92%	5,781
Nansemond County	3,716	70.43%	804	15.24%	754	14.29%	2	0.04%	2,912	55.19%	5,276
Nelson County	962	66.53%	347	24.00%	137	9.47%			615	42.53%	1,446
New Kent County	880	68.80%	270	21.11%	129	10.09%			610	47.69%	1,279
Northampton County	1,126	58.28%	688	35.61%	118	6.11%			438	22.67%	1,932
Northumberland County	1,780	61.17%	949	32.61%	181	6.22%			831	28.56%	2,910
Nottoway County	1,882	59.05%	608	19.08%	697	21.87%			1,185	37.18%	3,187
Orange County	1,174	60.17%	627	32.14%	150	7.69%			547	28.04%	1,951
Page County	2,399	48.42%	2,463	49.71%	92	1.86%	1	0.02%	-64	-1.29%	4,955
Patrick County	1,347	60.11%	750	33.47%	144	6.43%			597	26.64%	2,241
Pittsylvania County	3,869	55.41%	1,581	22.64%	1,529	21.90%	3	0.04%	2,288	32.77%	6,982
Powhatan County	880	54.83%	223	13.89%	502	31.28%			378	23.55%	1,605
Prince Edward County	2,099	60.84%	900	26.09%	451	13.07%			1,199	34.75%	3,450
Prince George County	1,396	61.99%	462	20.52%	394	17.50%			934	41.47%	2,252
Prince William County	4,372	63.57%	1,976	28.73%	527	7.66%	2	0.03%	2,396	34.84%	6,877
Pulaski County	2,446	49.76%	2,288	46.54%	182	3.70%			158	3.21%	4,916
Rappahannock County	818	77.32%	213	20.13%	27	2.55%			605	57.18%	1,058
Richmond County	1,086	67.37%	432	26.80%	94	5.83%			654	40.57%	1,612
Roanoke County	4,618	38.62%	6,891	57.63%	449	3.75%			-2,273	-19.01%	11,958
Rockbridge County	897	46.91%	936	48.95%	79	4.13%			-39	-2.04%	1,912
Rockingham County	2,701	43.48%	3,298	53.09%	211	3.40%	2	0.03%	-597	-9.61%	6,212
Russell County	3,670	51.63%	3,254	45.78%	184	2.59%			416	5.85%	7,108
Scott County	3,401	44.53%	4,001	52.38%	236	3.09%			-600	-7.86%	7,638
Shenandoah County	2,517	41.61%	3,440	56.87%	92	1.52%			-923	-15.26%	6,049
Smyth County	3,574	45.99%	4,017	51.69%	180	2.32%			-443	-5.70%	7,771
Southampton County	1,800	56.66%	454	14.29%	921	28.99%	2	0.06%	879	27.67%	3,177
Spotsylvania County	2,685	72.47%	873	23.56%	147	3.97%			1,812	48.91%	3,705
Stafford County	3,004	64.35%	1,496	32.05%	168	3.60%			1,508	32.31%	4,668
Surry County	1,211	77.48%	196	12.54%	155	9.92%	1	0.06%	1,015	64.94%	1,563
Sussex County	1,890	65.42%	468	16.20%	525	18.17%	6	0.21%	1,365	47.25%	2,889
Tazewell County	3,861	55.35%	2,881	41.30%	233	3.34%			980	14.05%	6,975
Warren County	2,089	63.48%	1,147	34.85%	55	1.67%			942	28.62%	3,291
Washington County	4,230	47.35%	4,460	49.93%	243	2.72%			-230	-2.57%	8,933
Westmoreland County	2,093	73.31%	630	22.07%	132	4.62%			1,463	51.24%	2,855
Wise County	5,965	60.77%	3,690	37.60%	160	1.63%			2,275	23.18%	9,815
Wythe County	2,394	48.43%	2,365	47.85%	184	3.72%			29	0.59%	4,943
York County	2,161	53.54%	1,516	37.56%	359	8.89%			645	15.98%	4,036
Alexandria City	9,836	62.34%	5,492	34.81%	447	2.83%	3	0.02%	4,344	27.53%	15,778
Bristol City	2,031	64.58%	1,067	33.93%	47	1.49%			964	30.65%	3,145
Buena Vista City	382	51.62%	328	44.32%	28	3.78%	2	0.27%	54	7.30%	740
Charlottesville City	3,748	59.58%	2,335	37.12%	206	3.27%	2	0.03%	1,413	22.46%	6,291
Chesapeake City	8,114	61.42%	2,793	21.14%	2,303	17.43%			5,321	40.28%	13,210
Clifton Forge City	728	60.41%	432	35.85%	45	3.73%			296	24.56%	1,205
Colonial Heights City	1,568	55.58%	843	29.88%	410	14.53%			725	25.70%	2,821
Covington City	1,240	60.40%	736	35.85%	76	3.70%	1	0.05%	504	24.55%	2,053
Danville City	3,682	53.85%	1,725	25.23%	1,431	20.93%			1,957	28.62%	6,838
Fairfax City	2,014	60.77%	1,159	34.97%	141	4.25%			855	25.80%	3,314
Falls Church City	1,842	65.13%	901	31.86%	85	3.01%			941	33.27%	2,828
Franklin City	772	58.35%	273	20.63%	276	20.86%	2	0.15%	496	37.49%	1,323
Fredericksburg City	2,998	73.19%	995	24.29%	102	2.49%	1	0.02%	2,003	48.90%	4,096
Galax City	498	46.50%	550	51.35%	23	2.15%			-52	-4.86%	1,071
Hampton City	9,797	66.66%	3,887	26.45%	1,008	6.86%	5	0.03%	5,910	40.21%	14,697
Harrisonburg City	1,353	51.31%	1,229	46.61%	55	2.09%			124	4.70%	2,637
Hopewell City	1,850	57.05%	884	27.26%	508	15.66%	1	0.03%	966	29.79%	3,243
Lexington City	599	48.38%	623	50.32%	16	1.29%			-24	-1.94%	1,238
Lynchburg City	4,241	40.85%	3,355	32.32%	2,786	26.83%			886	8.53%	10,382
Martinsville City	1,893	62.00%	1,067	34.95%	93	3.05%			826	27.06%	3,053
Newport News City	10,481	62.99%	4,858	29.20%	1,300	7.81%			5,623	33.79%	16,639
Norfolk City	22,091	70.52%	7,407	23.65%	1,826	5.83%			14,684	46.88%	31,324
Norton City	618	59.54%	409	39.40%	11	1.06%			209	20.13%	1,038
Petersburg City	4,903	76.59%	949	14.82%	550	8.59%			3,954	61.76%	6,402
Portsmouth City	13,478	78.05%	2,727	15.79%	1,064	6.16%			10,751	62.26%	17,269
Radford City	1,060	46.80%	1,158	51.13%	47	2.08%			-98	-4.33%	2,265
Richmond City	28,403	71.74%	8,538	21.56%	2,632	6.65%	21	0.05%	19,865	50.17%	39,594
Roanoke City	8,147	48.92%	8,000	48.04%	507	3.04%			147	0.88%	16,654
South Boston City	913	63.76%	400	27.93%	119	8.31%			513	35.82%	1,432
Staunton City	2,257	53.94%	1,774	42.40%	153	3.66%			483	11.54%	4,184
Suffolk City	1,507	69.32%	470	21.62%	195	8.97%	2	0.09%	1,037	47.70%	2,174
Virginia Beach City	11,587	68.07%	4,392	25.80%	1,043	6.13%			7,195	42.27%	17,022
Waynesboro City	1,181	40.43%	1,659	56.80%	81	2.77%			-478	-16.36%	2,921
Williamsburg City	753	61.07%	420	34.06%	60	4.87%			333	27.01%	1,233
Winchester City	2,297	70.44%	911	27.94%	52	1.59%	1	0.03%	1,386	42.50%	3,261
Totals	429,855	58.57%	245,681	33.48%	58,251	7.94%	92	0.01%	184,174	25.10%	733,879

== See also ==
- 1966 United States Senate elections
