= Westwater Resources =

Explorer and developer of US-based mineral resources

Westwater Resources, Inc.
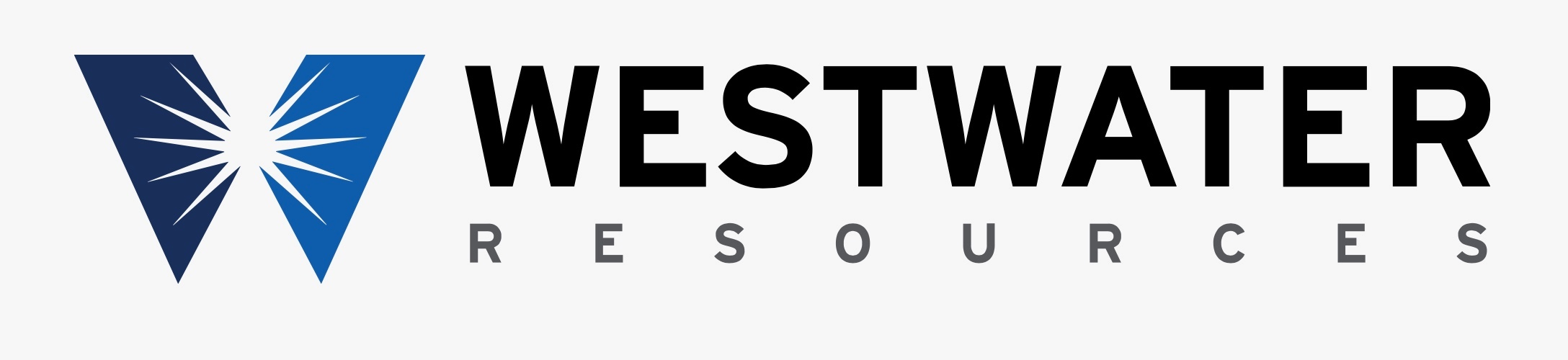
- Westwater Resources, Inc. Logo
- Type: Public limited company
- Traded as: Nasdaq: WWR
- Industry: Industrial Metals & Minerals
- Founded: 1977
- Headquarters: Centennial, Colorado
- Area served: U.S.
- Key people: Frank Bakker (President & CEO); Steven Cates (Vice President & CFO); John Lawrence (General Counsel); Cevat Er (CTO); Terence J. Cryan (Chairman of the Board); Jon Jacobs (Chief Commercial Officer); Tracy D. Pagliara (Director); Karli Anderson (Director); Deborah A. Peacock (Director)
- Website: www.westwaterresources.net

Westwater Resources, Inc. (WWR), is an explorer and developer of US-based mineral resources essential to clean energy production. The company has operated some uranium facilities in the past, however they have recently been exploring graphite and vanadium. Vanadium is a critical mineral which currently sees little to no production in the US, and graphite is anticipated to see a rise in demand for batteries due to accelerating electric vehicle production. Westwater is now focused on developing an advanced battery graphite business in the state of Alabama.

== Company history ==
In 1977, the company was founded in Southern Texas solely operating in uranium.

In 2003, the company proposed to mine in traditional Navajo territory. In 2012, the EPA was considering a permit for the Church Rock mine, which had a large uranium spill contaminating the Puerco River and washing downstream to the Navajo Nation in 1979 when it was owned by the United Nuclear Corporation. An online petition received over 15,000 supporters standing against the re-permitting of the Church Rock mine. On April 8, 2016, the company sold its subsidiary, Hydro Resources, Inc. (which holds the Church Rock and Crownpoint uranium properties in New Mexico) to Laramide Resources, Ltd.

In August 2012, the company merged with Neutron Energy, Inc.

In August 2017, the company changed its name from Uranium Resources to Westwater Resources, Inc. The company previously traded under the ticker symbol URRE.

Westwater Resources acquired Alabama Graphite Corp. in April 2018.

== Uranium ==
The company sold its uranium assets located in New Mexico and Texas to enCore Energy Corp. of Vancouver, British Columbia, Canada, a Toronto Venture Exchange-listed company (TSXV:EU). Total consideration accruing to Westwater from the deal is $1.8 million in enCore shares (2,571,598 shares), representing a 1.5% ownership of enCore, and two royalties from future production from the New Mexico uranium properties. enCore also assumed the asset retirement obligation on all remaining uranium reclamation activities associated with the assets in the amount of approximately $6.0 million. The company has since sold its shares in enCore Energy Corp.

Since 2007, Westwater Resources had invested in exploration and development of its uranium projects in Turkey, namely in Temrezli and Sefaatli. The government of Turkey maintains that all permits granted to the company for Uranium exploration were "issued by mistake." Experts have estimated that the Temrezli mine alone would generate revenues of up to $644 million over its life, resulting in a net ROI of $267 million. However, after repeated attempts to make contact with the Turkish government, the company filed a request for arbitration with the International Centre for Settlement of Investment Disputes (ICSID) as a result of Turkey's unlawful actions. Their request was registered and a three-member ICSID panel was formed. On March 3, 2023, the arbitral tribunal issued its final award in the proceeding, requiring Turkey to pay Westwater $1.3 million in damages, reimburse Westwater for its fees and expenses (approximately $3.7 million), and to pay interest as well. On April 14, 2023, Westwater filed a Notice of rectification which seeks to correct an error in the tribunal's calculation, which if granted would increase the award from $1.3 million to $2.8 million. The Republic of Turkey filed a rejoinder on June 14, 2023.

== Graphite ==
In early to mid 2018, Westwater Resources completed the acquisition of Alabama Graphite. Part of that acquisition included the Coosa Graphite Project, held under a long-term lease. It lies about 25 miles southwest of Sylacauga, Alabama and covers 41,900 acres of land at the southern end of the Appalachian Mountains. Westwater anticipates a full scale mining rate of 577,000 short tons per year, at an average grade of 3.2% graphite. Westwater plans to use bulldozers, excavators, loading equipment, and 45-ton haul trucks to bring the material to the processing plant, by which point they will have replaced the outsourced graphite supply with their own. Once at the processing plant, the metallurgical process of flotation processing will be employed to remove impurities, without damaging the graphite flakes. From there, the graphite will go through multiple rod and ball mill grinders as well as additional flotation units.

As for turning the natural flake graphite into a battery-ready product, Westwater Resources has turned to Dorfner Anzaplan (based in Hirschau, Germany) to define the method, equipment, and operating parameters for graphite purification to the 99.95% threshold.

One potentially lucrative aspect of the Coosa Graphite project is that graphite has been declared a critical strategic mineral by the Department of Defense contractors. Whenever possible, the US military is legally required to use US sourced materials. Therefore, the company has a strong chance of attracting those contractors as customers.

In 2022 the company broke ground at the Kellyton Graphite Processing Facility in Coosa County, Alabama.

In March 2023 they reported equipment being delivered to the Kellyton, Alabama facility.

In 2023 Westwater signed an agreement with SK On to "study and develop over the next three years eco-friendly and high-performance anode materials specialized for SK On batteries".

In 2024 Westwater signed its first offtake agreement with SK On to source a total of 34,000 tons of natural graphite anode products processed at Westwater's Kellyton Graphite Plant for its battery manufacturing facilities in the U.S.

== Vanadium ==
The Coosa Graphite project contains widespread and strong vanadium mineralization in very close association with strong flake graphite deposits, both of which have been listed by the US Geological Survey as Critical Minerals. Vanadium is primarily used as an alloying agent for iron and steel. Currently three countries: China, Russia, and South Africa account for 96% of all Vanadium production. Vanadium is primarily found at the Coosa Graphite Project in the form of Roscoelite, a greenish mineral in the mica group.
