= 1966 United States Senate special election in Virginia =

- November 8, 1966
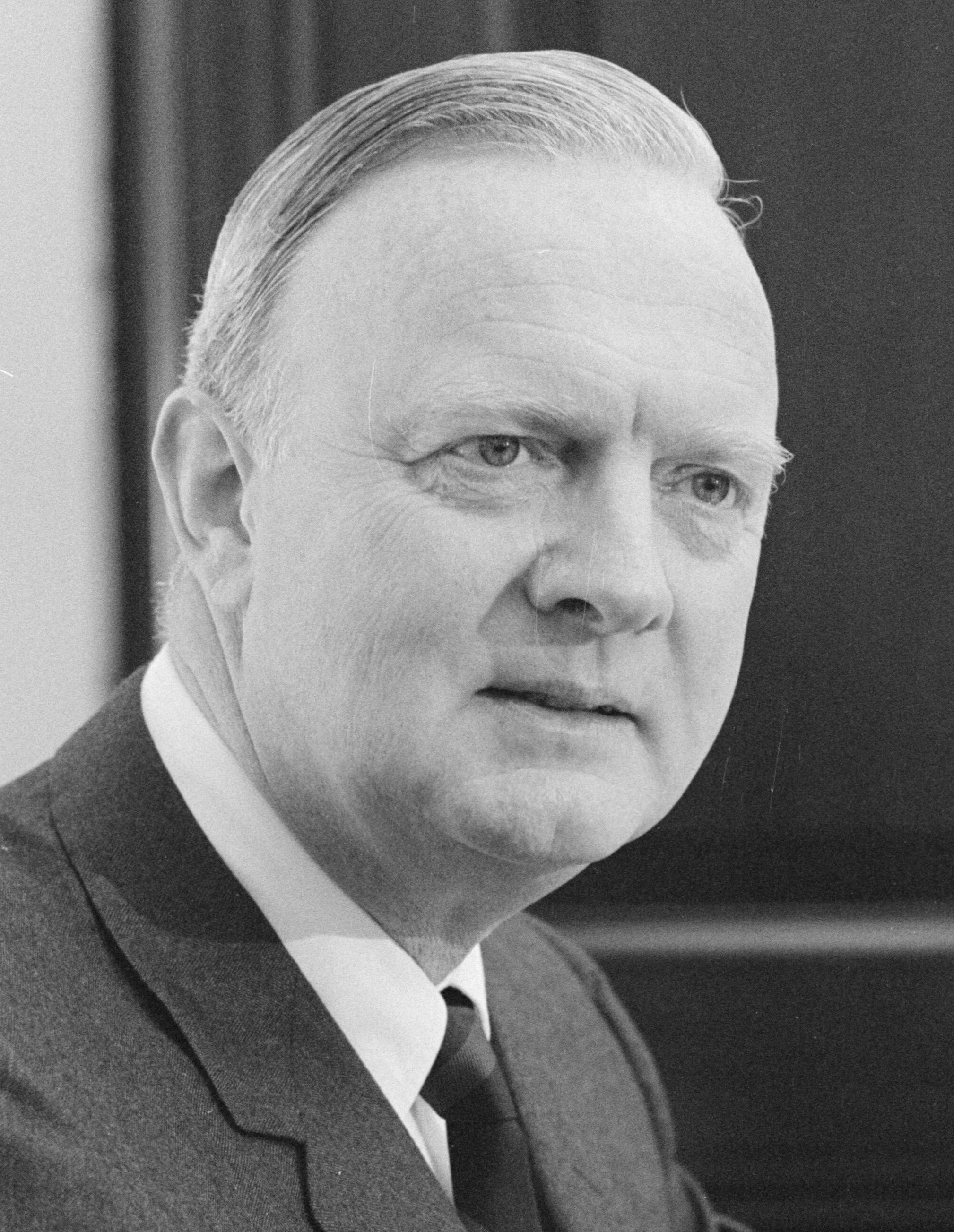

| Nominee | Harry F. Byrd Jr. | Lawrence M. Traylor | John W. Carter |
| Party | Democratic | Republican | Conservative |
| Popular vote | 389,028 | 272,804 | 57,692 |
| Percentage | 53.30% | 37.38% | 7.90% |
- County and independent city results Byrd: 30–40% 40–50% 50–60% 60–70% 70–80% 80–90% Traylor: 30–40% 40–50% 50–60% 70–80%
U.S. senator before election
Harry F. Byrd Jr.
Democratic
Elected U.S. Senator
Harry F. Byrd Jr.
Democratic

The 1966 United States Senate special election in Virginia was held on November 8, 1966, alongside the other U.S. Senate election in Virginia. Incumbent Senator Harry F. Byrd Sr. had retired the previous year for health reasons, and his son Harry F. Byrd Jr. had been appointed to replace him. The younger Byrd defeated Republican Lawrence M. Traylor and Conservative Party of Virginia candidate John W. Carter, and was able to finish the balance of his father's sixth term.

Due to Byrd switching parties in 1970, this was the last time until 1988 that a Democrat was elected to this seat.

== Democratic primary ==
=== Candidates ===
- Harry F. Byrd Jr., interim U.S. senator since 1965 and son of former senator Harry F. Byrd
- Armistead L. Boothe, state senator from Alexandria

=== Campaign ===
The primary was held on the same day as another primary for Virginia's other Senate seat. Both Byrd and longtime Senator A. Willis Robertson were opposed by more liberal "antiorganization" challengers, and although all four candidates ran separate campaigns the elections took on familiar organization versus antiorganization characteristics.

==== Primary results ====
1966 U.S. Senate special election Democratic primary
| Party | Candidate | Votes | % |
|---|---|---|---|
| Democratic | Harry F. Byrd Jr. (incumbent) | 221,221 | 50.95% |
| Democratic | Armistead L. Boothe | 212,996 | 49.05% |
| Total votes | | 434,217 | 100.00% |

Unlike Robertson, Byrd held his Democratic candidacy against longtime "Young Turk" Boothe, who had had a substantial career in the state legislature opposing "massive resistance" and after failing to reform the organization, would firmly split form it by 1963, although he had had conflicts with it as early as 1950 when he proposed bills ending segregation on public transportation. Boothe campaigned by attacking Byrd's philosophy and his record on massive resistance, while Byrd largely ignored Boothe and presented himself as a defender of states' and individual rights.

The fact that many Byrd Organization members are known to have supported Robertson's opponent William B. Spong Jr., and that Boothe failed to avoid the "anti-organization" label as Spong could, alongside the power of Byrd's name, may account for Boothe's narrow failure to emulate Spong by defeating a conservative Senate incumbent.

==== Primary results by county and independent city ====
1966 Virginia Senate special election Democratic primary by county or independent city
| | Harry Flood Byrd Jr. Democratic | | Armistead Lloyd Boothe Democratic | | Margin | | Total votes cast |
| | # | % | # | % | # | % | Total votes cast |
|---|---|---|---|---|---|---|---|
| Accomack County | 1,850 | 53.38% | 1,616 | 46.62% | 234 | 6.75% | 3,466 |
| Albemarle County | 1,635 | 56.93% | 1,237 | 43.07% | 398 | 13.86% | 2,872 |
| Alleghany County | 420 | 59.91% | 281 | 40.09% | 139 | 19.83% | 701 |
| Amelia County | 916 | 66.33% | 465 | 33.67% | 451 | 32.66% | 1,381 |
| Amherst County | 1,224 | 66.31% | 622 | 33.69% | 602 | 32.61% | 1,846 |
| Appomattox County | 2,559 | 85.13% | 447 | 14.87% | 2,112 | 70.26% | 3,006 |
| Arlington County | 6,658 | 37.01% | 11,333 | 62.99% | -4,675 | -25.99% | 17,991 |
| Augusta County | 1,338 | 65.56% | 703 | 34.44% | 635 | 31.11% | 2,041 |
| Bath County | 226 | 71.29% | 91 | 28.71% | 135 | 42.59% | 317 |
| Bedford County | 1,603 | 72.27% | 615 | 27.73% | 988 | 44.54% | 2,218 |
| Bland County | 298 | 68.82% | 135 | 31.18% | 163 | 37.64% | 433 |
| Botetourt County | 521 | 52.84% | 465 | 47.16% | 56 | 5.68% | 986 |
| Brunswick County | 1,793 | 60.31% | 1,180 | 39.69% | 613 | 20.62% | 2,973 |
| Buchanan County | 430 | 27.18% | 1,152 | 72.82% | -722 | -45.64% | 1,582 |
| Buckingham County | 1,583 | 77.87% | 450 | 22.13% | 1,133 | 55.73% | 2,033 |
| Campbell County | 1,734 | 73.41% | 628 | 26.59% | 1,106 | 46.82% | 2,362 |
| Caroline County | 848 | 48.07% | 916 | 51.93% | -68 | -3.85% | 1,764 |
| Carroll County | 218 | 27.25% | 582 | 72.75% | -364 | -45.50% | 800 |
| Charles City County | 210 | 21.92% | 748 | 78.08% | -538 | -56.16% | 958 |
| Charlotte County | 1,361 | 77.95% | 385 | 22.05% | 976 | 55.90% | 1,746 |
| Chesterfield County | 5,041 | 66.22% | 2,571 | 33.78% | 2,470 | 32.45% | 7,612 |
| Clarke County | 1,135 | 77.69% | 326 | 22.31% | 809 | 55.37% | 1,461 |
| Craig County | 116 | 46.96% | 131 | 53.04% | -15 | -6.07% | 247 |
| Culpeper County | 1,336 | 62.81% | 791 | 37.19% | 545 | 25.62% | 2,127 |
| Cumberland County | 955 | 58.66% | 673 | 41.34% | 282 | 17.32% | 1,628 |
| Dickenson County | 652 | 42.59% | 879 | 57.41% | -227 | -14.83% | 1,531 |
| Dinwiddie County | 1,915 | 67.33% | 929 | 32.67% | 986 | 34.67% | 2,844 |
| Essex County | 583 | 61.89% | 359 | 38.11% | 224 | 23.78% | 942 |
| Fairfax County | 9,148 | 32.00% | 19,443 | 68.00% | -10,295 | -36.01% | 28,591 |
| Fauquier County | 1,943 | 58.14% | 1,399 | 41.86% | 544 | 16.28% | 3,342 |
| Floyd County | 135 | 45.92% | 159 | 54.08% | -24 | -8.16% | 294 |
| Fluvanna County | 463 | 77.55% | 134 | 22.45% | 329 | 55.11% | 597 |
| Franklin County | 1,116 | 55.72% | 887 | 44.28% | 229 | 11.43% | 2,003 |
| Frederick County | 1,978 | 76.91% | 594 | 23.09% | 1,384 | 53.81% | 2,572 |
| Giles County | 592 | 54.46% | 495 | 45.54% | 97 | 8.92% | 1,087 |
| Gloucester County | 870 | 66.31% | 442 | 33.69% | 428 | 32.62% | 1,312 |
| Goochland County | 1,280 | 60.21% | 846 | 39.79% | 434 | 20.41% | 2,126 |
| Grayson County | 360 | 36.92% | 615 | 63.08% | -255 | -26.15% | 975 |
| Greene County | 135 | 64.29% | 75 | 35.71% | 60 | 28.57% | 210 |
| Greensville County | 1,626 | 55.57% | 1,300 | 44.43% | 326 | 11.14% | 2,926 |
| Halifax County | 2,181 | 77.73% | 625 | 22.27% | 1,556 | 55.45% | 2,806 |
| Hanover County | 2,430 | 67.99% | 1,144 | 32.01% | 1,286 | 35.98% | 3,574 |
| Henrico County | 11,744 | 68.33% | 5,443 | 31.67% | 6,301 | 36.66% | 17,187 |
| Henry County | 928 | 52.94% | 825 | 47.06% | 103 | 5.88% | 1,753 |
| Highland County | 192 | 85.71% | 32 | 14.29% | 160 | 71.43% | 224 |
| Isle of Wight County | 1,006 | 50.00% | 1,006 | 50.00% | 0 | 0.00% | 2,012 |
| James City County | 520 | 46.26% | 604 | 53.74% | -84 | -7.47% | 1,124 |
| King and Queen County | 449 | 50.96% | 432 | 49.04% | 17 | 1.93% | 881 |
| King George County | 427 | 51.51% | 402 | 48.49% | 25 | 3.02% | 829 |
| King William County | 725 | 60.47% | 474 | 39.53% | 251 | 20.93% | 1,199 |
| Lancaster County | 1,518 | 74.52% | 519 | 25.48% | 999 | 49.04% | 2,037 |
| Lee County | 257 | 13.17% | 1,695 | 86.83% | -1,438 | -73.67% | 1,952 |
| Loudoun County | 1,931 | 58.27% | 1,383 | 41.73% | 548 | 16.54% | 3,314 |
| Louisa County | 1,424 | 67.01% | 701 | 32.99% | 723 | 34.02% | 2,125 |
| Lunenburg County | 1,201 | 64.16% | 671 | 35.84% | 530 | 28.31% | 1,872 |
| Madison County | 502 | 70.51% | 210 | 29.49% | 292 | 41.01% | 712 |
| Mathews County | 589 | 65.30% | 313 | 34.70% | 276 | 30.60% | 902 |
| Mecklenburg County | 2,309 | 71.22% | 933 | 28.78% | 1,376 | 42.44% | 3,242 |
| Middlesex County | 443 | 70.99% | 181 | 29.01% | 262 | 41.99% | 624 |
| Montgomery County | 875 | 56.09% | 685 | 43.91% | 190 | 12.18% | 1,560 |
| Nansemond County | 1,690 | 44.88% | 2,076 | 55.12% | -386 | -10.25% | 3,766 |
| Nelson County | 630 | 64.15% | 352 | 35.85% | 278 | 28.31% | 982 |
| New Kent County | 322 | 43.93% | 411 | 56.07% | -89 | -12.14% | 733 |
| Northampton County | 1,026 | 69.56% | 449 | 30.44% | 577 | 39.12% | 1,475 |
| Northumberland County | 746 | 53.25% | 655 | 46.75% | 91 | 6.50% | 1,401 |
| Nottoway County | 1,743 | 68.17% | 814 | 31.83% | 929 | 36.33% | 2,557 |
| Orange County | 1,048 | 68.18% | 489 | 31.82% | 559 | 36.37% | 1,537 |
| Page County | 1,246 | 78.27% | 346 | 21.73% | 900 | 56.53% | 1,592 |
| Patrick County | 595 | 43.05% | 787 | 56.95% | -192 | -13.89% | 1,382 |
| Pittsylvania County | 3,711 | 67.88% | 1,756 | 32.12% | 1,955 | 35.76% | 5,467 |
| Powhatan County | 591 | 54.22% | 499 | 45.78% | 92 | 8.44% | 1,090 |
| Prince Edward County | 2,169 | 64.50% | 1,194 | 35.50% | 975 | 28.99% | 3,363 |
| Prince George County | 975 | 55.40% | 785 | 44.60% | 190 | 10.80% | 1,760 |
| Prince William County | 2,532 | 55.25% | 2,051 | 44.75% | 481 | 10.50% | 4,583 |
| Pulaski County | 961 | 51.53% | 904 | 48.47% | 57 | 3.06% | 1,865 |
| Rappahannock County | 811 | 77.61% | 234 | 22.39% | 577 | 55.22% | 1,045 |
| Richmond County | 598 | 66.52% | 301 | 33.48% | 297 | 33.04% | 899 |
| Roanoke County | 2,117 | 57.19% | 1,585 | 42.81% | 532 | 14.37% | 3,702 |
| Rockbridge County | 720 | 62.18% | 438 | 37.82% | 282 | 24.35% | 1,158 |
| Rockingham County | 1,112 | 65.11% | 596 | 34.89% | 516 | 30.21% | 1,708 |
| Russell County | 504 | 28.85% | 1,243 | 71.15% | -739 | -42.30% | 1,747 |
| Scott County | 275 | 21.11% | 1,028 | 78.89% | -753 | -57.79% | 1,303 |
| Shenandoah County | 1,413 | 75.48% | 459 | 24.52% | 954 | 50.96% | 1,872 |
| Smyth County | 540 | 37.71% | 892 | 62.29% | -352 | -24.58% | 1,432 |
| Southampton County | 1,422 | 61.37% | 895 | 38.63% | 527 | 22.74% | 2,317 |
| Spotsylvania County | 1,057 | 42.54% | 1,428 | 57.46% | -371 | -14.93% | 2,485 |
| Stafford County | 1,182 | 43.01% | 1,566 | 56.99% | -384 | -13.97% | 2,748 |
| Surry County | 891 | 54.66% | 739 | 45.34% | 152 | 9.33% | 1,630 |
| Sussex County | 1,774 | 70.31% | 749 | 29.69% | 1,025 | 40.63% | 2,523 |
| Tazewell County | 775 | 47.11% | 870 | 52.89% | -95 | -5.78% | 1,645 |
| Warren County | 1,196 | 55.55% | 957 | 44.45% | 239 | 11.10% | 2,153 |
| Washington County | 1,037 | 45.24% | 1,255 | 54.76% | -218 | -9.51% | 2,292 |
| Westmoreland County | 853 | 53.92% | 729 | 46.08% | 124 | 7.84% | 1,582 |
| Wise County | 1,440 | 49.23% | 1,485 | 50.77% | -45 | -1.54% | 2,925 |
| Wythe County | 699 | 49.57% | 711 | 50.43% | -12 | -0.85% | 1,410 |
| York County | 1,154 | 50.35% | 1,138 | 49.65% | 16 | 0.70% | 2,292 |
| Alexandria City | 3,821 | 33.63% | 7,541 | 66.37% | -3,720 | -32.74% | 11,362 |
| Bristol City | 632 | 43.32% | 827 | 56.68% | -195 | -13.37% | 1,459 |
| Buena Vista City | 403 | 77.06% | 120 | 22.94% | 283 | 54.11% | 523 |
| Charlottesville City | 2,148 | 45.99% | 2,523 | 54.01% | -375 | -8.03% | 4,671 |
| Chesapeake City | 5,352 | 48.59% | 5,663 | 51.41% | -311 | -2.82% | 11,015 |
| Clifton Forge City | 406 | 70.61% | 169 | 29.39% | 237 | 41.22% | 575 |
| Colonial Heights City | 1,456 | 78.41% | 401 | 21.59% | 1,055 | 56.81% | 1,857 |
| Covington City | 529 | 54.42% | 443 | 45.58% | 86 | 8.85% | 972 |
| Danville City | 2,873 | 64.20% | 1,602 | 35.80% | 1,271 | 28.40% | 4,475 |
| Fairfax City | 896 | 41.40% | 1,268 | 58.60% | -372 | -17.19% | 2,164 |
| Falls Church City | 510 | 35.99% | 907 | 64.01% | -397 | -28.02% | 1,417 |
| Franklin City | 589 | 62.73% | 350 | 37.27% | 239 | 25.45% | 939 |
| Fredericksburg City | 1,432 | 45.50% | 1,715 | 54.50% | -283 | -8.99% | 3,147 |
| Galax City | 360 | 36.92% | 615 | 63.08% | -255 | -26.15% | 975 |
| Hampton City | 4,742 | 44.82% | 5,839 | 55.18% | -1,097 | -10.37% | 10,581 |
| Harrisonburg City | 888 | 73.63% | 318 | 26.37% | 570 | 47.26% | 1,206 |
| Hopewell City | 1,471 | 61.09% | 937 | 38.91% | 534 | 22.18% | 2,408 |
| Lexington City | 451 | 46.69% | 515 | 53.31% | -64 | -6.63% | 966 |
| Lynchburg City | 3,294 | 60.72% | 2,131 | 39.28% | 1,163 | 21.44% | 5,425 |
| Martinsville City | 873 | 54.77% | 721 | 45.23% | 152 | 9.54% | 1,594 |
| Newport News City | 4,742 | 44.82% | 5,839 | 55.18% | -1,097 | -10.37% | 10,581 |
| Norfolk City | 9,759 | 34.12% | 18,845 | 65.88% | -9,086 | -31.76% | 28,604 |
| Norton City | 194 | 44.60% | 241 | 55.40% | -47 | -10.80% | 435 |
| Petersburg City | 2,813 | 48.12% | 3,033 | 51.88% | -220 | -3.76% | 5,846 |
| Portsmouth City | 5,535 | 35.67% | 9,983 | 64.33% | -4,448 | -28.66% | 15,518 |
| Radford City | 309 | 47.32% | 344 | 52.68% | -35 | -5.36% | 653 |
| Richmond City | 14,713 | 47.16% | 16,483 | 52.84% | -1,770 | -5.67% | 31,196 |
| Roanoke City | 3,713 | 49.69% | 3,760 | 50.31% | -47 | -0.63% | 7,473 |
| South Boston City | 609 | 80.45% | 148 | 19.55% | 461 | 60.90% | 757 |
| Staunton City | 1,269 | 61.36% | 799 | 38.64% | 470 | 22.73% | 2,068 |
| Suffolk City | 1,121 | 62.24% | 680 | 37.76% | 441 | 24.49% | 1,801 |
| Virginia Beach City | 7,193 | 48.85% | 7,531 | 51.15% | -338 | -2.30% | 14,724 |
| Waynesboro City | 719 | 56.93% | 544 | 43.07% | 175 | 13.86% | 1,263 |
| Williamsburg City | 435 | 40.17% | 648 | 59.83% | -213 | -19.67% | 1,083 |
| Winchester City | 2,269 | 84.98% | 401 | 15.02% | 1,868 | 69.96% | 2,670 |
| Totals | 221,221 | 50.95% | 212,996 | 49.05% | 8,225 | 1.89% | 434,217 |

== General election ==
=== Candidates ===
- J. B. Brayman (Independent)
- Harry F. Byrd Jr., interim U.S. senator since 1965 (Democratic)
- John W. Carter (Conservative)
- Lawrence Traylor, Heathsville attorney (Republican)

=== Campaign ===
Thinking Byrd less vulnerable than the winner of the Spong–Robertson primary, the Republican Party nominated little-known Heathsville attorney Lawrence Traylor for the special election. Unlike fellow GOP nominee James P. Ould, Jr., who already held the mayoral office in Lynchburg, Traylor only announced shortly before the deadline.

Byrd was also opposed by John W. Carter of the Virginia Conservative Party, which was formed by hard-line Byrd Democrats who believed that the pay-as-you-go political system must be reinforced and federal control eliminated throughout the state. Support by several leaders of the machine for Lyndon Johnson in the 1964 presidential election – most critically future party-switching two-time Governor Mills Godwin – angered this group and led it away from even the conservative state Democratic Party. Both Conservative Senate candidates devoted their campaigns to attacking the major parties for refusing to debate such issues as the supposed takeover of schools, inflation due to the War on Poverty, and judicial appointments that the Conservatives believed responsible for the crime wave of the 1960s.

=== Results ===
1966 United States Senate special election in Virginia
| Party | Candidate | Votes | % | ±% |
|---|---|---|---|---|
| Democratic | Harry F. Byrd Jr. (inc.) | 389,028 | 53.30% | −10.50% |
| Republican | Lawrence M. Traylor | 272,804 | 37.38% | +18.35% |
| Conservative | John W. Carter | 57,692 | 7.90% | |
| Independent | J.B. Brayman | 10,180 | 1.39% | −1.91% |
| Write-ins | | 135 | 0.02% | +0.01% |
| Majority | | 116,224 | 15.92% | −28.85% |
| Turnout | | 729,839 | | |
| Democratic hold | | | | |

Whereas Ould would run a conservative campaign, Traylor ran to the left of Byrd, actively seeking Black and even labor support. Despite his lack of political experience, anti-Byrd sentiment among black voters – about half newly enfranchised since the Twenty-Fourth Amendment – would ensure Traylor ran several percent ahead of Ould. (Note: In intensively studied urban Black precincts, Traylor would win over 85 percent of the vote, whereas Ould won just 4 percent.) Some observers thought that if the GOP had run Ould or another more prominent Republican against Byrd, they could have captured his seat.

=== Results by county or independent city ===
1966 United States Senate special election in Virginia by county or independent city
| | Harry Flood Byrd Jr. Democratic | | Lawrence M. Traylor Republican | | John W. Carter Virginia Conservative | | Jack B. Brayman Independent | | Various candidates Write-ins | | Margin | | Total votes cast |
| | # | % | # | % | # | % | # | % | # | % | # | % | Total votes cast |
|---|---|---|---|---|---|---|---|---|---|---|---|---|---|
| Accomack County | 2,634 | 62.65% | 1,261 | 30.00% | 262 | 6.23% | 47 | 1.12% | | | 1,373 | 32.66% | 4,204 |
| Albemarle County | 3,012 | 66.59% | 1,221 | 27.00% | 244 | 5.39% | 40 | 0.88% | 6 | 0.13% | 1,791 | 39.60% | 4,523 |
| Alleghany County | 1,027 | 58.96% | 560 | 32.15% | 131 | 7.52% | 24 | 1.38% | | | 467 | 26.81% | 1,742 |
| Amelia County | 867 | 45.44% | 494 | 25.89% | 529 | 27.73% | 18 | 0.94% | | | 338 (Note: In this county or city where Traylor ran third behind both Carter and Byrd, margin given is Byrd vote minus Carter vote and percentage margin Byrd percentage minus Carter percentage.) | 17.71% | 1,908 |
| Amherst County | 2,084 | 60.18% | 934 | 26.97% | 418 | 12.07% | 25 | 0.72% | 2 | 0.06% | 1,150 | 33.21% | 3,463 |
| Appomattox County | 2,600 | 78.20% | 436 | 13.11% | 261 | 7.85% | 26 | 0.78% | 2 | 0.06% | 2,164 | 65.08% | 3,325 |
| Arlington County | 19,688 | 54.65% | 12,923 | 35.87% | 1,334 | 3.70% | 2,077 | 5.77% | 5 | 0.01% | 6,765 | 18.78% | 36,027 |
| Augusta County | 3,137 | 51.22% | 2,556 | 41.74% | 378 | 6.17% | 51 | 0.83% | 2 | 0.03% | 581 | 9.49% | 6,124 |
| Bath County | 783 | 57.03% | 479 | 34.89% | 97 | 7.06% | 14 | 1.02% | | | 304 | 22.14% | 1,373 |
| Bedford County | 2,785 | 57.02% | 1,189 | 24.34% | 835 | 17.10% | 75 | 1.54% | | | 1,596 | 32.68% | 4,884 |
| Bland County | 767 | 54.44% | 574 | 40.74% | 43 | 3.05% | 25 | 1.77% | | | 193 | 13.70% | 1,409 |
| Botetourt County | 1,601 | 51.50% | 1,317 | 42.36% | 160 | 5.15% | 31 | 1.00% | | | 284 | 9.13% | 3,109 |
| Brunswick County | 1,272 | 35.88% | 1,026 | 28.94% | 1,219 | 34.39% | 28 | 0.79% | | | 53 | 1.50% | 3,545 |
| Buchanan County | 3,805 | 54.75% | 2,745 | 39.50% | 187 | 2.69% | 213 | 3.06% | | | 1,060 | 15.25% | 6,950 |
| Buckingham County | 1,670 | 71.28% | 506 | 21.60% | 145 | 6.19% | 22 | 0.94% | | | 1,164 | 49.68% | 2,343 |
| Campbell County | 3,043 | 58.49% | 1,264 | 24.29% | 810 | 15.57% | 86 | 1.65% | | | 1,779 | 34.19% | 5,203 |
| Caroline County | 1,577 | 50.10% | 1,245 | 39.55% | 303 | 9.63% | 23 | 0.73% | | | 332 | 10.55% | 3,148 |
| Carroll County | 1,257 | 26.07% | 3,384 | 70.18% | 123 | 2.55% | 58 | 1.20% | | | -2,127 | -44.11% | 4,822 |
| Charles City County | 297 | 21.46% | 1,045 | 75.51% | 33 | 2.38% | 9 | 0.65% | | | -748 | -54.05% | 1,384 |
| Charlotte County | 1,155 | 47.45% | 446 | 18.32% | 802 | 32.95% | 31 | 1.27% | | | 353 | 14.50% | 2,434 |
| Chesterfield County | 7,590 | 46.67% | 4,864 | 29.91% | 3,632 | 22.33% | 177 | 1.09% | | | 2,726 | 16.76% | 16,263 |
| Clarke County | 1,375 | 82.78% | 246 | 14.81% | 24 | 1.44% | 16 | 0.96% | | | 1,129 | 67.97% | 1,661 |
| Craig County | 418 | 49.18% | 397 | 46.71% | 26 | 3.06% | 9 | 1.06% | | | 21 | 2.47% | 850 |
| Culpeper County | 1,561 | 62.54% | 820 | 32.85% | 76 | 3.04% | 39 | 1.56% | | | 741 | 29.69% | 2,496 |
| Cumberland County | 837 | 47.80% | 744 | 42.49% | 157 | 8.97% | 13 | 0.74% | | | 93 | 5.31% | 1,751 |
| Dickenson County | 2,915 | 49.21% | 2,766 | 46.70% | 139 | 2.35% | 103 | 1.74% | | | 149 | 2.52% | 5,923 |
| Dinwiddie County | 1,873 | 57.49% | 836 | 25.66% | 524 | 16.08% | 25 | 0.77% | | | 1,037 | 31.83% | 3,258 |
| Essex County | 937 | 53.76% | 735 | 42.17% | 61 | 3.50% | 10 | 0.57% | | | 202 | 11.59% | 1,743 |
| Fairfax County | 32,665 | 53.59% | 25,617 | 42.03% | 1,876 | 3.08% | 768 | 1.26% | 30 | 0.05% | 7,048 | 11.56% | 60,956 |
| Fauquier County | 2,873 | 65.99% | 1,317 | 30.25% | 95 | 2.18% | 69 | 1.58% | | | 1,556 | 35.74% | 4,354 |
| Floyd County | 728 | 36.35% | 1,186 | 59.21% | 61 | 3.05% | 27 | 1.35% | 1 | 0.05% | -458 | -22.87% | 2,003 |
| Fluvanna County | 739 | 58.88% | 280 | 22.31% | 226 | 18.01% | 10 | 0.80% | | | 459 | 36.57% | 1,255 |
| Franklin County | 1,854 | 57.51% | 947 | 29.37% | 351 | 10.89% | 72 | 2.23% | | | 907 | 28.13% | 3,224 |
| Frederick County | 2,878 | 74.71% | 891 | 23.13% | 50 | 1.30% | 33 | 0.86% | | | 1,987 | 51.58% | 3,852 |
| Giles County | 2,082 | 50.67% | 1,847 | 44.95% | 139 | 3.38% | 41 | 1.00% | | | 235 | 5.72% | 4,109 |
| Gloucester County | 1,182 | 57.66% | 588 | 28.68% | 241 | 11.76% | 39 | 1.90% | | | 594 | 28.98% | 2,050 |
| Goochland County | 1,360 | 50.22% | 991 | 36.60% | 342 | 12.63% | 14 | 0.52% | 1 | 0.04% | 369 | 13.63% | 2,708 |
| Grayson County | 1,801 | 42.94% | 2,246 | 53.55% | 104 | 2.48% | 43 | 1.03% | | | -445 | -10.61% | 4,194 |
| Greene County | 417 | 50.61% | 363 | 44.05% | 38 | 4.61% | 6 | 0.73% | | | 54 | 6.55% | 824 |
| Greensville County | 1,259 | 33.03% | 1,622 | 42.55% | 896 | 23.50% | 35 | 0.92% | | | -363 | -9.52% | 3,812 |
| Halifax County | 2,709 | 58.16% | 851 | 18.27% | 1,031 | 22.13% | 67 | 1.44% | | | 1,678 | 36.02% | 4,658 |
| Hanover County | 3,454 | 59.12% | 1,797 | 30.76% | 556 | 9.52% | 35 | 0.60% | | | 1,657 | 28.36% | 5,842 |
| Henrico County | 14,433 | 57.21% | 7,845 | 31.10% | 2,858 | 11.33% | 87 | 0.34% | 4 | 0.02% | 6,588 | 26.11% | 25,227 |
| Henry County | 1,946 | 49.14% | 1,505 | 38.01% | 392 | 9.90% | 117 | 2.95% | | | 441 | 11.14% | 3,960 |
| Highland County | 386 | 49.36% | 368 | 47.06% | 19 | 2.43% | 9 | 1.15% | | | 18 | 2.30% | 782 |
| Isle of Wight County | 1,296 | 44.41% | 977 | 33.48% | 611 | 20.94% | 32 | 1.10% | 2 | 0.07% | 319 | 10.93% | 2,918 |
| James City County | 694 | 47.18% | 617 | 41.94% | 128 | 8.70% | 30 | 2.04% | 2 | 0.14% | 77 | 5.23% | 1,471 |
| King and Queen County | 706 | 47.19% | 675 | 45.12% | 105 | 7.02% | 10 | 0.67% | | | 31 | 2.07% | 1,496 |
| King George County | 944 | 57.35% | 644 | 39.13% | 36 | 2.19% | 22 | 1.34% | | | 300 | 18.23% | 1,646 |
| King William County | 1,049 | 58.80% | 590 | 33.07% | 129 | 7.23% | 16 | 0.90% | | | 459 | 25.73% | 1,784 |
| Lancaster County | 1,597 | 59.57% | 934 | 34.84% | 137 | 5.11% | 13 | 0.48% | | | 663 | 24.73% | 2,681 |
| Lee County | 4,162 | 54.00% | 3,269 | 42.41% | 157 | 2.04% | 120 | 1.56% | | | 893 | 11.59% | 7,708 |
| Loudoun County | 3,589 | 68.56% | 1,286 | 24.57% | 200 | 3.82% | 160 | 3.06% | | | 2,303 | 43.99% | 5,235 |
| Louisa County | 1,913 | 61.24% | 903 | 28.91% | 234 | 7.49% | 63 | 2.02% | 11 | 0.35% | 1,010 | 32.33% | 3,124 |
| Lunenburg County | 1,255 | 46.88% | 577 | 21.55% | 836 | 31.23% | 9 | 0.34% | | | 419 | 15.65% | 2,677 |
| Madison County | 788 | 60.85% | 456 | 35.21% | 38 | 2.93% | 13 | 1.00% | | | 332 | 25.64% | 1,295 |
| Mathews County | 777 | 55.74% | 493 | 35.37% | 112 | 8.03% | 12 | 0.86% | | | 284 | 20.37% | 1,394 |
| Mecklenburg County | 2,300 | 49.15% | 1,230 | 26.28% | 1,123 | 24.00% | 27 | 0.58% | | | 1,070 | 22.86% | 4,680 |
| Middlesex County | 588 | 50.26% | 364 | 31.11% | 205 | 17.52% | 13 | 1.11% | | | 224 | 19.15% | 1,170 |
| Montgomery County | 2,593 | 44.27% | 2,928 | 49.99% | 265 | 4.52% | 69 | 1.18% | 2 | 0.03% | -335 | -5.72% | 5,857 |
| Nansemond County | 2,382 | 47.64% | 1,809 | 36.18% | 745 | 14.90% | 64 | 1.28% | | | 573 | 11.46% | 5,000 |
| Nelson County | 1,038 | 69.20% | 263 | 17.53% | 169 | 11.27% | 30 | 2.00% | | | 775 | 51.67% | 1,500 |
| New Kent County | 551 | 42.88% | 582 | 45.29% | 140 | 10.89% | 12 | 0.93% | | | -31 | -2.41% | 1,285 |
| Northampton County | 1,072 | 56.57% | 683 | 36.04% | 123 | 6.49% | 17 | 0.90% | | | 389 | 20.53% | 1,895 |
| Northumberland County | 1,165 | 38.41% | 1,771 | 58.39% | 89 | 2.93% | 8 | 0.26% | | | -606 | -19.98% | 3,033 |
| Nottoway County | 1,754 | 53.51% | 788 | 24.04% | 708 | 21.60% | 20 | 0.61% | 8 | 0.24% | 966 | 29.47% | 3,278 |
| Orange County | 1,324 | 67.21% | 480 | 24.37% | 138 | 7.01% | 28 | 1.42% | | | 844 | 42.84% | 1,970 |
| Page County | 2,647 | 52.49% | 2,274 | 45.09% | 92 | 1.82% | 30 | 0.59% | | | 373 | 7.40% | 5,043 |
| Patrick County | 1,307 | 59.76% | 714 | 32.65% | 124 | 5.67% | 42 | 1.92% | | | 593 | 27.11% | 2,187 |
| Pittsylvania County | 3,437 | 50.43% | 987 | 14.48% | 2,286 | 33.54% | 105 | 1.54% | | | 1,151 | 16.89% | 6,815 |
| Powhatan County | 575 | 34.64% | 645 | 38.86% | 429 | 25.84% | 11 | 0.66% | | | -70 | -4.22% | 1,660 |
| Prince Edward County | 2,089 | 58.93% | 1,041 | 29.37% | 401 | 11.31% | 14 | 0.39% | | | 1,048 | 29.56% | 3,545 |
| Prince George County | 1,180 | 51.22% | 737 | 31.99% | 366 | 15.89% | 21 | 0.91% | | | 443 | 19.23% | 2,304 |
| Prince William County | 4,374 | 62.62% | 2,045 | 29.28% | 298 | 4.27% | 267 | 3.82% | 1 | 0.01% | 2,329 | 33.34% | 6,985 |
| Pulaski County | 2,428 | 49.57% | 2,158 | 44.06% | 241 | 4.92% | 71 | 1.45% | | | 270 | 5.51% | 4,898 |
| Rappahannock County | 820 | 76.71% | 212 | 19.83% | 25 | 2.34% | 12 | 1.12% | | | 608 | 56.88% | 1,069 |
| Richmond County | 957 | 56.93% | 667 | 39.68% | 50 | 2.97% | 7 | 0.42% | | | 290 | 17.25% | 1,681 |
| Roanoke County | 5,882 | 48.21% | 5,501 | 45.09% | 624 | 5.11% | 194 | 1.59% | | | 381 | 3.12% | 12,201 |
| Rockbridge County | 1,077 | 55.89% | 726 | 37.68% | 105 | 5.45% | 19 | 0.99% | | | 351 | 18.21% | 1,927 |
| Rockingham County | 3,243 | 51.65% | 2,727 | 43.43% | 240 | 3.82% | 69 | 1.10% | | | 516 | 8.22% | 6,279 |
| Russell County | 3,482 | 49.31% | 3,256 | 46.11% | 208 | 2.95% | 116 | 1.64% | | | 226 | 3.20% | 7,062 |
| Scott County | 3,291 | 43.75% | 3,902 | 51.87% | 186 | 2.47% | 143 | 1.90% | | | -611 | -8.12% | 7,522 |
| Shenandoah County | 2,888 | 46.96% | 3,082 | 50.11% | 136 | 2.21% | 44 | 0.72% | | | -194 | -3.15% | 6,150 |
| Smyth County | 3,516 | 45.11% | 3,979 | 51.05% | 202 | 2.59% | 98 | 1.26% | | | -463 | -5.94% | 7,795 |
| Southampton County | 1,383 | 43.08% | 955 | 29.75% | 853 | 26.57% | 19 | 0.59% | | | 428 | 13.33% | 3,210 |
| Spotsylvania County | 2,239 | 60.30% | 1,257 | 33.85% | 141 | 3.80% | 76 | 2.05% | | | 982 | 26.45% | 3,713 |
| Stafford County | 2,782 | 60.11% | 1,572 | 33.97% | 177 | 3.82% | 96 | 2.07% | 1 | 0.02% | 1,210 | 26.15% | 4,628 |
| Surry County | 810 | 51.36% | 612 | 38.81% | 143 | 9.07% | 11 | 0.70% | 1 | 0.06% | 198 | 12.56% | 1,577 |
| Sussex County | 1,591 | 53.21% | 992 | 33.18% | 396 | 13.24% | 11 | 0.37% | | | 599 | 20.03% | 2,990 |
| Tazewell County | 4,036 | 56.54% | 2,757 | 38.62% | 227 | 3.18% | 118 | 1.65% | | | 1,279 | 17.92% | 7,138 |
| Warren County | 2,208 | 64.67% | 1,132 | 33.16% | 58 | 1.70% | 16 | 0.47% | | | 1,076 | 31.52% | 3,414 |
| Washington County | 4,662 | 52.00% | 3,949 | 44.04% | 242 | 2.70% | 113 | 1.26% | | | 713 | 7.95% | 8,966 |
| Westmoreland County | 1,712 | 58.55% | 1,127 | 38.54% | 66 | 2.26% | 19 | 0.65% | | | 585 | 20.01% | 2,924 |
| Wise County | 5,708 | 59.14% | 3,632 | 37.63% | 182 | 1.89% | 130 | 1.35% | | | 2,076 | 21.51% | 9,652 |
| Wythe County | 2,452 | 49.61% | 2,242 | 45.36% | 203 | 4.11% | 46 | 0.93% | | | 210 | 4.25% | 4,943 |
| York County | 1,872 | 46.38% | 1,748 | 43.31% | 349 | 8.65% | 67 | 1.66% | | | 124 | 3.07% | 4,036 |
| Alexandria City | 8,479 | 53.71% | 6,419 | 40.66% | 486 | 3.08% | 394 | 2.50% | 9 | 0.06% | 2,060 | 13.05% | 15,787 |
| Bristol City | 2,165 | 69.26% | 867 | 27.74% | 59 | 1.89% | 35 | 1.12% | | | 1,298 | 41.52% | 3,126 |
| Buena Vista City | 467 | 63.19% | 214 | 28.96% | 47 | 6.36% | 11 | 1.49% | | | 253 | 34.24% | 739 |
| Charlottesville City | 3,662 | 59.86% | 2,119 | 34.64% | 280 | 4.58% | 56 | 0.92% | 1 | 0.02% | 1,543 | 25.22% | 6,118 |
| Chesapeake City | 6,478 | 51.05% | 3,734 | 29.43% | 2,336 | 18.41% | 141 | 1.11% | | | 2,744 | 21.63% | 12,689 |
| Clifton Forge City | 794 | 65.67% | 329 | 27.21% | 75 | 6.20% | 11 | 0.91% | | | 465 | 38.46% | 1,209 |
| Colonial Heights City | 1,977 | 68.01% | 510 | 17.54% | 397 | 13.66% | 23 | 0.79% | | | 1,467 | 50.46% | 2,907 |
| Covington City | 1,228 | 59.58% | 673 | 32.65% | 128 | 6.21% | 32 | 1.55% | | | 555 | 26.93% | 2,061 |
| Danville City | 3,295 | 43.86% | 1,775 | 23.63% | 2,370 | 31.55% | 71 | 0.95% | 1 | 0.01% | 925 | 12.31% | 7,512 |
| Fairfax City | 1,919 | 58.03% | 1,152 | 34.84% | 167 | 5.05% | 69 | 2.09% | | | 767 | 23.19% | 3,307 |
| Falls Church City | 1,710 | 59.98% | 1,034 | 36.27% | 71 | 2.49% | 35 | 1.23% | 1 | 0.04% | 676 | 23.71% | 2,851 |
| Franklin City | 717 | 52.03% | 385 | 27.94% | 260 | 18.87% | 15 | 1.09% | 1 | 0.07% | 332 | 24.09% | 1,378 |
| Fredericksburg City | 2,403 | 58.74% | 1,553 | 37.96% | 92 | 2.25% | 42 | 1.03% | 1 | 0.02% | 850 | 20.78% | 4,091 |
| Galax City | 544 | 50.94% | 462 | 43.26% | 50 | 4.68% | 12 | 1.12% | | | 82 | 7.68% | 1,068 |
| Hampton City | 6,490 | 44.72% | 6,864 | 47.30% | 1,015 | 6.99% | 134 | 0.92% | 8 | 0.06% | -374 | -2.58% | 14,511 |
| Harrisonburg City | 1,629 | 60.38% | 991 | 36.73% | 73 | 2.71% | 5 | 0.19% | | | 638 | 23.65% | 2,698 |
| Hopewell City | 1,879 | 57.73% | 794 | 24.39% | 550 | 16.90% | 31 | 0.95% | 1 | 0.03% | 1,085 | 33.33% | 3,255 |
| Lexington City | 543 | 44.62% | 632 | 51.93% | 30 | 2.47% | 7 | 0.58% | 5 | 0.41% | -89 | -7.31% | 1,217 |
| Lynchburg City | 6,530 | 61.22% | 3,337 | 31.28% | 698 | 6.54% | 102 | 0.96% | | | 3,193 | 29.93% | 10,667 |
| Martinsville City | 1,580 | 50.71% | 1,315 | 42.20% | 177 | 5.68% | 44 | 1.41% | | | 265 | 8.50% | 3,116 |
| Newport News City | 8,693 | 55.67% | 5,291 | 33.88% | 1,390 | 8.90% | 242 | 1.55% | | | 3,402 | 21.79% | 15,616 |
| Norfolk City | 13,763 | 51.28% | 10,902 | 40.62% | 1,965 | 7.32% | 211 | 0.79% | | | 2,861 | 10.66% | 26,841 |
| Norton City | 597 | 57.74% | 406 | 39.26% | 22 | 2.13% | 9 | 0.87% | | | 191 | 18.47% | 1,034 |
| Petersburg City | 3,061 | 48.05% | 2,773 | 43.53% | 517 | 8.11% | 20 | 0.31% | | | 288 | 4.52% | 6,371 |
| Portsmouth City | 8,539 | 59.37% | 4,538 | 31.55% | 1,188 | 8.26% | 118 | 0.82% | | | 4,001 | 27.82% | 14,383 |
| Radford City | 1,140 | 49.96% | 1,034 | 45.31% | 69 | 3.02% | 39 | 1.71% | | | 106 | 4.65% | 2,282 |
| Richmond City | 18,009 | 46.00% | 18,356 | 46.88% | 2,591 | 6.62% | 184 | 0.47% | 13 | 0.03% | -347 | -0.89% | 39,153 |
| Roanoke City | 8,513 | 50.28% | 7,460 | 44.06% | 745 | 4.40% | 213 | 1.26% | | | 1,053 | 6.22% | 16,931 |
| South Boston City | 977 | 66.28% | 275 | 18.66% | 213 | 14.45% | 9 | 0.61% | | | 702 | 47.63% | 1,474 |
| Staunton City | 2,331 | 55.38% | 1,618 | 38.44% | 225 | 5.35% | 30 | 0.71% | 5 | 0.12% | 713 | 16.94% | 4,209 |
| Suffolk City | 1,416 | 66.26% | 503 | 23.54% | 201 | 9.41% | 15 | 0.70% | 2 | 0.09% | 913 | 42.72% | 2,137 |
| Virginia Beach City | 9,026 | 54.64% | 6,110 | 36.99% | 1,238 | 7.49% | 146 | 0.88% | | | 2,916 | 17.65% | 16,520 |
| Waynesboro City | 1,488 | 50.51% | 1,312 | 44.53% | 116 | 3.94% | 29 | 0.98% | 1 | 0.03% | 176 | 5.97% | 2,946 |
| Williamsburg City | 571 | 49.18% | 431 | 37.12% | 88 | 7.58% | 66 | 5.68% | 5 | 0.43% | 140 | 12.06% | 1,161 |
| Winchester City | 2,797 | 85.07% | 415 | 12.62% | 57 | 1.73% | 19 | 0.58% | | | 2,382 | 72.45% | 3,288 |
| Totals | 389,028 | 53.30% | 272,804 | 37.38% | 57,692 | 7.90% | 10,180 | 1.39% | 135 | 0.02% | 116,224 | 15.92% | 729,839 |

== See also ==
- List of special elections to the United States Senate
- 1966 United States Senate elections
