= Byrd Amendment (1971) =

US law resuming trade with Rhodesia

- Other short titles: Military Procurement Authorization of 1971
- Long title: An Act to authorize appropriations during the fiscal year 1972 for procurement of aircraft, missiles, naval vessels, tracked combat vehicles, torpedoes, and other weapons, and research, development, test, and evaluation for the Armed Forces, and to prescribe the authorized personnel strength of the Selected Reserve of each Reserve component of the Armed Forces, and for other purposes.
- Nicknames: Military Appropriations Authorization Act of 1971
- Enacted by: the 92nd United States Congress
- Effective: November 17, 1971

Citations
- Public law: 92-156
- Statutes at Large: 85 Stat. 423 aka 85 Stat. 427

Codification
- Acts amended: Strategic and Critical Materials Stock Piling Act of 1939
- Titles amended: 50 U.S.C.: War and National Defense
- U.S.C. sections amended: 50 U.S.C. ch. 5, subch. III § 98h–4

Legislative history
- Introduced in the House as H.R. 8687 by J. Herbert Burke (R–FL) on May 26, 1971; Committee consideration by House Military Affairs, Senate Military Affairs; Passed the House on June 17, 1971 (331-58); Passed the Senate on October 6, 1971 (82-4); Reported by the joint conference committee on November 5, 1971; agreed to by the House on November 10, 1971 (251-100) and by the Senate on November 11, 1971 (65-19); Signed into law by President Richard Nixon on November 17, 1971

The Byrd Amendment—named for its author, Senator Harry F. Byrd Jr. of Virginia—was a 1971 amendment to the U.S. Federal Strategic and Critical Materials Stock Piling Act. It prohibited the US government from banning the importation of any strategic material from a non-communist country as long as the importation of the same materials from communist countries was also not prohibited. While it did not single out any particular country, it had the effect–intended by its sponsors–of creating an exception in the United States embargo of Rhodesia to enable the import of chromite ore from that country. Pro-segregation Southern legislators (Byrd Jr. himself was an ardent segregationist) and several American businesses pushed hard for the amendment.

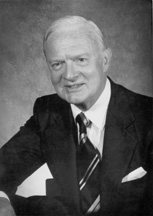
Harry F. Byrd Jr., United States Senator from Virginia, proposed the amendment, which came to bear his name.

Rhodesia, run by a mostly white supremacist government, was unrecognised internationally and under a United Nations-led trade boycott from 1965 following its Unilateral Declaration of Independence from Britain. Prior to the boycott, about 40 percent of US chrome came from Rhodesia, another 40 percent from the Soviet Union and the remaining 20 percent from South Africa, Turkey, Iran and elsewhere. Rhodesia had about 67 percent of the world's reserves of chromium, which is a key component of stainless steel. The United States had formerly been a major importer of Rhodesian chrome, acquiring $5 million (~$37.9 million in 2024) worth in 1965, but ceased all imports following the imposition of sanctions. The loss of imports from Rhodesia led to the Soviet Union's share of US chrome imports reaching a peak of 69 percent by 1968.

This situation was seen as undesirable in the light of Cold War considerations and was also opposed by an American network of pro-Rhodesian lobbyists and Congressmen, supported by American industrial concerns such as Union Carbide which stood to gain financially from a resumption in Rhodesian imports. The Byrd Amendment, despite breaching UN sanctions, was passed by the United States Congress to permit a resumption of Rhodesian chrome imports from January 1, 1972. It was signed by President Richard Nixon on November 17, 1971.

The amendment enabled the resumption of trading not just in chrome but also in nickel and asbestos, with the US importing $13.3 million worth of the three commodities in 1972. Even though the amendment was declared a violation of international law by Diggs v. Schultz in 1972, the chrome trade continued; by 1976 Rhodesia was estimated to be supplying 17 percent of US imports of chrome.

The ongoing violation of sanctions attracted widespread condemnation and damaged relations with black African countries. US liberals and civil rights groups also opposed it, but the Nixon administration was indifferent towards their views. The Gerald Ford administration took a mildly opposed stance, with Secretary of State Henry Kissinger criticising the amendment in a speech given in the Zambian capital Lusaka, but did little to try to reverse it. An attempt by congressional liberals to repeal the amendment was defeated in 1975 by a margin of 187 votes to 209.

Despite the opposition and the legal findings against the amendment, it was not repealed until March 1977, when newly elected President Jimmy Carter successfully pushed Congress to do so. The Ford administration had finally turned against the amendment in its last few months in 1976 and called for it to be repealed. The success of Carter's administration in persuading Congress to go along with this was due to a significant degree to a collapse in industry support for the amendment, as it had had the side effect of letting in more ferrochrome than raw chromium and caused the collapse of half of the American ferrochrome industry.

The Rhodesian government sought to put a brave face on the loss of the American market, announcing that it would have little economic impact, but it had a significant impact on the morale of the white minority government.
