= Harry F. Byrd Jr. =

American politician (1914–2013)

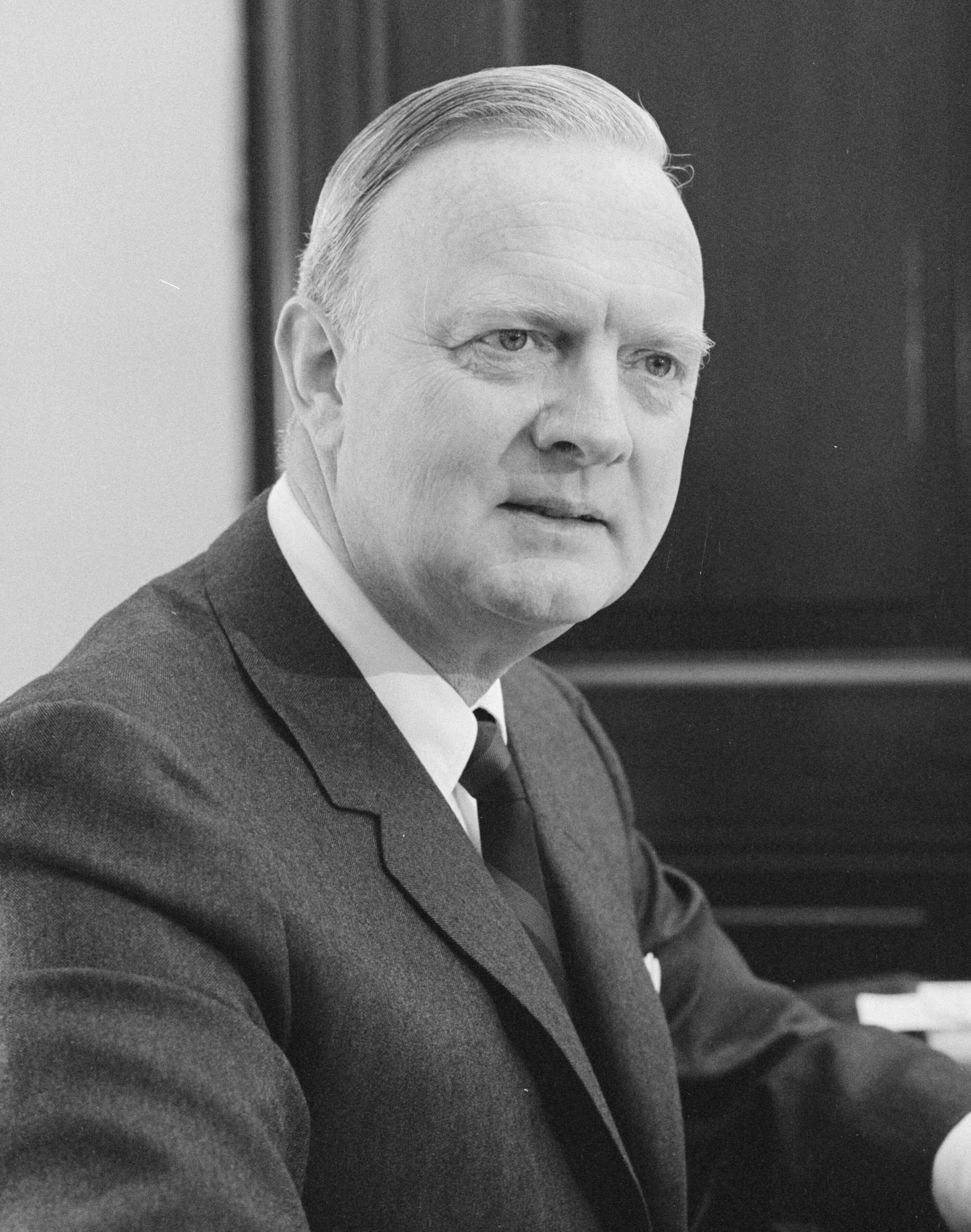
- Byrd in 1967

United States Senator from Virginia
- In office November 12, 1965 – January 3, 1983
- Preceded by: Harry F. Byrd Sr.
- Succeeded by: Paul Trible

Member of the Virginia Senate from the 24th district
- In office January 8, 1958 – November 12, 1965
- Preceded by: George S. Aldhizer II
- Succeeded by: J. Kenneth Robinson (redistricting)

Member of the Virginia Senate from the 25th district
- In office January 14, 1948 – January 8, 1958
- Preceded by: Burgess E. Nelson
- Succeeded by: Edward O. McCue Jr.

Personal details
- Born: Harry Flood Byrd Jr. December 20, 1914 Winchester, Virginia, U.S.
- Died: July 30, 2013 (aged 98) Winchester, Virginia, U.S.
- Resting place: Mount Hebron Cemetery
- Party: Democratic (before 1970); Independent (1970–2013)
- Other political affiliations: Senate Democratic Caucus (1965–1983)
- Spouse: Gretchen Bigelow Thomson (m. 1941; died 1989)
- Relations: Harry Flood Byrd Sr. (father); James M. Thomson (brother-in-law)
- Children: Harry III; Thomas; Beverley
- Education: Virginia Military Institute; University of Virginia

Military service
- Branch/service: United States Navy
- Years of service: 1941–1945
- Rank: Lieutenant Commander
- Battles/wars: World War II

Harry Flood Byrd Jr. (December 20, 1914 – July 30, 2013) was an American newspaper publisher and politician. He served in the Senate of Virginia and then represented Virginia in the United States Senate, succeeding his father, Harry F. Byrd Sr. His public service spanned 36 years, while he was a publisher of several Virginia newspapers. After the decline of the Byrd Organization due to its massive resistance to racial integration of public schools, he abandoned the Democratic Party in 1970, citing concern about its leftward tilt. He rehabilitated his political career, becoming the first independent in the history of the U.S. Senate to be elected by a majority of the popular vote.

== Family and education ==
Byrd was born December 20, 1914, in Winchester, Virginia, the eldest child of Harry F. Byrd Sr. and his wife Anne Byrd (née Beverley). His siblings included a sister, Westwood ("Westie"), and two brothers, Richard Evelyn (Dick) and Beverley. The Byrds were one of the First Families of Virginia, and Byrd was a member of the Virginia Society of the Sons of the American Revolution. His uncle, Rear Admiral Richard E. Byrd, was a pilot and polar explorer.

In 1931, at his father's urging, young Harry Byrd enrolled at Virginia Military Institute. Two years later, Byrd transferred to the University of Virginia, where he became a member of the St. Anthony Hall fraternity, but left before graduating due to familial obligations.

On August 9, 1941, Byrd married Gretchen Thompson. They had sons Harry and Thomas, and a daughter Beverley.

== Newspaper career and military service ==
In 1935, Byrd, nicknamed "Young Harry", left the University of Virginia in Charlottesville to shore up his father's newspaper, The Winchester Star. He also gave up an opportunity to join a global business in Paris. The Star had been without a full-time editor since his father left to represent Virginia in the United States Senate in 1933, as the Great Depression intensified. Upon joining the paper, his father warned him, "If you make too many mistakes, you're gone." However, the father also arranged for his son to learn the publishing business under the tutelage of John Crown at the Harrisonburg Daily News Record. Within a year of assuming the helm of the Winchester Star, Byrd became its editor and publisher, although his father retained financial control and advised him on editorials.

Byrd worked with many publishers of small newspapers in Virginia, assuming leadership sometimes directly or otherwise through a seat on the paper's board of directors. He became the publisher of the Harrisonburg Daily News Record from 1936 to 1941 and again from 1946 to 1981, and continued as a member of its board of directors until his death. Byrd later became owner of the Page Shenandoah Newspaper Corporation, which published The Page News and Courier in Luray and The Shenandoah Valley Herald in Woodstock. He left the Page Shenandoah Newspaper Corporation in 1987 and retired as Chairman of the Byrd newspapers in 2001, succeeded by his son Thomas. In all, he dedicated 78 years to publishing in one capacity or another. The entire Byrd family owned the publishing company for more than 100 years.

Shortly after his marriage, Byrd volunteered for the United States Navy during World War II and served initially in Navy Public Relations. He requested transfer to a combat position and was assigned to the Central Pacific as an executive officer with a bombing squadron of Consolidated PB2Y Coronados until mustering out in 1946. During his naval service, he rose to the rank of Lieutenant Commander.

After the war, Byrd oversaw construction of a new publishing plant for the Star. He also became a director of the Associated Press and later served as its vice-president.

== Virginia state senator ==
In 1948 Byrd won election to the Senate of Virginia for the district including Winchester, the area his father previously represented. He was the third consecutive generation of the Byrd family to enter politics. His grandfather Richard Evelyn Byrd Sr. served as the Speaker of the Virginia House of Delegates, and his father had served as a Virginia state senator, Governor of Virginia and United States senator. Byrd had begun accompanying his father on trips during the elder's governorship, and once remarked that "I was in every county and city in the state by the time I was thirteen years old." In time Byrd became a key member in his father's statewide political network, known as the Byrd Organization.

Byrd shared his father's belief in fiscal restraint by government, referred to as a "pay-as-you-go" policy. He reflected part of this populist political legacy when he stated, "I am convinced we have too many laws, too much government regulation, much too much government spending. The very wealthy can take care of themselves, the very needy are taken care of by the government. It is Middle America, the broad cross section, the people who work and to whom the government must look for taxes - it is they who have become the forgotten men and women."

Byrd served in the Senate of Virginia from 1948 to November 1965, where he was Chairman of the General Laws Committee. As a major player in the Byrd Organization, he supported Massive Resistance, a movement against desegregation which his father announced and led, despite the 1954 U.S. Supreme Court decision in Brown v. Board of Education. In 1956, Byrd provided strong and integral support of legislation that became known as the Stanley Plan (after then-Virginia Governor Thomas B. Stanley, a Byrd Organization member). The plan required the closing of all desegregating schools, even those desegregating pursuant to court order. It was invalidated within three years by both federal courts and the Virginia Supreme Court. The plan's legacy of racially based school closures and funding disruptions persisted in some localities until 1964, and was the nadir of the Byrd political brand.

The U.S. Supreme Court in Davis v. Mann and Reynolds v. Sims invalidated the unequal voting district apportionment relied upon by the Byrd Organization; Byrd made no plan or significant effort to reverse the organization's decline. Indeed, Byrd from the outset was intent on forging his own political path. In the state senate, he shepherded the Automatic Income Reduction Act, which guaranteed a tax rebate or credit to citizens whenever the general fund surplus exceeded certain levels. In just three years tens of millions of dollars were returned to Virginia taxpayers. Also in 1965, redistricting occurred as required by the Supreme Court decisions. Byrd's former 24th senatorial district, which included the counties of Clarke, Frederick and Shenandoah, as well as the city of Winchester, became the 21st District, as Loudoun County was added.

Byrd's father fell ill and announced his retirement from the U.S. Senate in November 1965. Governor Albertis S. Harrison Jr. appointed Harry Jr. to his father's seat, Harry Jr. duly resigned from the state senate, and was sworn into the United States Senate on November 12, 1965.

== U.S. Senator ==
Byrd sought the Democratic nomination in a special election in 1966 for the balance of his father's sixth term. He faced a strong primary challenge from a longtime opponent of Massive Resistance, fellow state senator Armistead Boothe of Alexandria, fending it off by 8,225 votes–a margin of less than a percentage point. On the same day, two of his father's longtime allies, Senator A. Willis Robertson and Congressman Howard W. Smith, were toppled by more liberal primary challengers. Although Harry Jr. easily won the general election in November, the 1966 primaries marked the beginning of the end for the Byrd Organization's three-decade dominance of Virginia politics.

In 1970, Byrd broke with the Democratic Party and became an independent rather than sign an oath to support the party's undetermined 1972 presidential nominee. He explained, "The Democratic National Committee is within its rights to require such an oath. I do not contest this action. I cannot, and will not, sign an oath to vote for an individual whose identity I do not know and whose principles and policies are thus unknown. To sign such a blank check would be, I feel, the height of irresponsibility and unworthy of a member of the United States Senate... I would rather be a free man than a captive senator."

Byrd then ran for a full term in the Senate in 1970 as an independent, although both major parties nominated candidates. Widely popular in the state, Byrd was elected with a majority of 54 percent against both Democrat George C. Rawlings Jr. of Fredericksburg and Republican Ray L. Garland of Roanoke. Byrd thus became the first independent to win a statewide election in Virginia, and also the first independent to win a U.S. Senate seat by a majority vote. Byrd's move is said to have influenced Virginia political power for more than twenty years.

In 1971, he authored the Byrd Amendment to the U.S. Federal Strategic and Critical Materials Stock Piling Act. It prohibited the US government from banning the importation of any strategic material from a non-communist country as long as the importation of the same materials from communist countries was also not prohibited. While it did not single out any particular country, it had the effect–intended by its sponsors–of creating an exception in the United States embargo of Rhodesia to enable the import of chromite ore from that country. Rhodesia, run by a mostly white minority government, was unrecognized internationally and under a United Nations-led trade boycott from 1965 following its Unilateral Declaration of Independence from Britain. The same year, he introduced a resolution to restore the citizenship of Confederate general Robert E. Lee.

He continued to caucus with the Democrats and was allowed to keep his seniority. However, like his father, Byrd had a very conservative voting record and was a strong supporter of federal fiscal discipline, as he had been at the state level. In fact, he authored, and Congress passed, a floor amendment stating, "Beginning with fiscal year 1981, the total budget outlays of the Federal Government should not exceed its receipts." Consistent with this fiscal policy, Byrd was a minimalist as a producer of legislation, believing less was more. Byrd was initially a supporter of the Vietnam War, but in September 1975, he cast the deciding Senate Armed Services Committee vote against the Ford administration's request for emergency appropriations for South Vietnam and Cambodia, effectively ending U.S. support for the war. When chairman John C. Stennis, a supporter of the war, asked Byrd if he had intended to vote no, Byrd reportedly affirmed his vote and told Stennis "They have lied to me long enough."

Byrd easily won reelection in 1976 against Democrat Admiral Elmo R. Zumwalt Jr. He thereby became the first senator to win election and re-election as an independent. Unlike in 1970, the Republicans did not run a candidate that year and concentrated on carrying Virginia in the presidential election, which they did, for Gerald Ford.

Byrd's committee assignments in the Senate included the Finance Committee and Armed Services Committee. Even as a senator, Byrd contributed regular editorial content to his newspapers, blending journalism and politics.

In a 1982 interview with The Washington Post, Byrd maintained that his earlier resistance to school desegregation, including the closure of schools, was justified and helped prevent racial violence.

Byrd did not run for reelection in 1982 and returned full-time to his home in Winchester; he and his father had held the "Byrd seat" in the Senate for fifty consecutive years. Byrd was succeeded by Congressman Paul S. Trible, who narrowly defeated the Democratic candidate, Richard J. Davis Jr. Trible served one term.

== Retirement ==
Even with his formal retirement from the Senate, Byrd retained his interest, and his independence, in politics; he endorsed Marshall Coleman, the Republican nominee for Governor of Virginia in 1989. He publicly supported Democratic Governor Mark Warner in the 2001 Virginia gubernatorial election, although Warner sought to raise taxes and faced conservative opposition. He endorsed Mitt Romney, the Republican candidate in the 2012 presidential election.

Byrd enjoyed retirement at his home in Winchester, "Courtfield," and time spent with his nine grandchildren and later his twelve great-grandchildren. Byrd's wife of 48 years, Gretchen, died in 1989. He continued to serve as chairman of the board of the Star for almost twenty years. In 2003 he was named to the Virginia Communications Hall of Fame. Byrd became a lecturer at Shenandoah University, and in 1984 the business program was renamed the Harry F. Byrd Jr. School of Business. His name was removed from the business school after a unanimous vote on June 10, 2020, due to the senator's legacy as a civil rights opponent. In 2007 Byrd completed a literary work, Double Trouble: Vignettes From A Life of Politics and Newspapering. On October 20, 2009, with the death of retired U.S. Senator Clifford P. Hansen, a Wyoming Republican, Byrd became the oldest living former senator until his death at the age of 98.

Byrd appeared in the PBS special "Chasing Churchill: In Search of My Grandfather", a show by Winston Churchill's granddaughter, Celia Sandys, in which she travels the world retracing the steps of Churchill and meeting the people he used to know. Byrd recalled experiences he had when Churchill visited his family's home in Virginia and stayed with them for a week.

== Death ==
Byrd died of heart failure on July 30, 2013, at Courtfield, his home in Winchester, Virginia. At the time Byrd was the 8th oldest individual to have served in the Senate. A tribute published shortly thereafter observed that Byrd and his father "shared a name, a tradition, many political views and an abiding love of Virginia. They also shared a character articulated ... by the late Sen. Everett Dirksen, Republican of Illinois: 'There are gentle men in whom gentility finally destroys whatever of iron there was in their souls. There are iron men in whom the iron corroded whatever gentility they possessed. There are men—not many to be sure—in whom the gentility and the iron were preserved in proper balance, each of these attributes to be summoned up as the occasion requires. Such a man was Harry Byrd.'"

== See also ==
- List of United States senators who switched parties

== Bibliography ==
- Hatch, Alden (1969). The Byrds of Virginia. Holt, Rinehart and Winston.
- Heinemann, Ronald L. (1996). Harry Byrd of Virginia. University Press of Virginia.

== Works ==
- Byrd, Harry F. (2007). Double Trouble: Vignettes From A Life of Politics and Newspapering. R.R. Donnelly.

U.S. Senate
Preceded by Harry Byrd	U.S. Senator (Class 1) from Virginia; 1965–1983; Served alongside: Willis Robertson, William Spong, William Scott, John Warner	Succeeded by Paul Trible
Party political offices
Preceded by Harry Byrd	Democratic nominee for U.S. Senator from Virginia (Class 1); 1966	Succeeded by George Rawlings
Honorary titles
Preceded by Clifford Hansen	Oldest living United States senator (Sitting or former); 2009–2013	Succeeded by Edward Brooke
