= Henry Bird =

Henry Bird may refer to:

- Henry Bird (chess player) (1830–1908), English chess player and chess writer
- Henry Bird (cricketer) (1800–1864), English professional cricketer
- Henry Bird (artist) (1909–2000), British artist
- Henry Bird (judge) (1892–1971), Canadian lawyer and judge
- Henry Real Bird (born 1948), Native Crow Indian

== See also ==
- Henry Bird Steinhauer (1804–1885), Native Ojibwe Indian and Methodist missionary
- Professor Longhair (1918–1980), also known as Henry Byrd, American singer and pianist
- Henry Byrd (American football) (born 1999), American football player
- Henry Byrde, 2nd Commander of the Ceylon Volunteers
