= Strategic and Critical Materials Stock Piling Act of 1939 =

- Long title: An Act to provide for the common defense by acquiring stocks of strategic and critical materials essential to the needs of industry for the manufacture of supplies for the armed forces and the civilian population in time of a national emergency, and to encourage, as far as possible, the further development of strategic and critical materials within the United States for common defense.
- Acronyms (colloquial): SCMA
- Nicknames: National Defense Stockpile Act of 1939
- Enacted by: the 76th United States Congress
- Effective: June 7, 1939

Citations
- Public law: Pub. L. 76–117
- Statutes at Large: 53 Stat. 811

Codification
- Titles amended: 50 U.S.C.: War and National Defense
- U.S.C. sections created: 50 U.S.C. ch. 5, subch. III § 98 et seq.

Legislative history
- Introduced in the Senate as S. 572 by Elbert D. Thomas (D–UT) on February 28, 1939; Committee consideration by Senate Military Affairs, House Military Affairs; Passed the Senate on March 31, 1939 (56-13); Passed the House on April 25, 1939 (Passed, in lieu of H.R. 5191); Reported by the joint conference committee on May 15, 1939; agreed to by the House on June 1, 1939 (Agreed) and by the Senate on June 5, 1939 (Agreed); Signed into law by President Franklin D. Roosevelt on June 7, 1939

Strategic and Critical Materials Stock Piling Act of 1939, 50 USC § 98, is a United States federal law establishing strategic materials supply reserves for the United States common defense, industrial demands, and military commitments. The Act of Congress authorize the acquisition of raw material stocks for inventory disposition, rotation, and storage within the United States.

The Senate legislation was passed by the 76th Congressional session and enacted into law by the 32nd President of the United States Franklin Roosevelt on June 7, 1939.

== Provisions of the Act ==
The strategic war materials federal law was drafted as seven sections providing critical material supplies in the event of dependence for a national emergency or threat to the national security of the United States.

50 U.S.C. § 1 ~	Declaration of Policy
50 U.S.C. § 2 ~	Determination of Strategic and Critical Materials; Quantities of Strategic and Critical Materials
50 U.S.C. § 3 ~	U.S. Treasury Purchase Domestic Production or Supply Insufficient; Replacement of Stocks of Material Subject to Deterioration; Annual Report of Expenditures and Method of Materials Rotation
50 U.S.C. § 4 ~	Strategic and Critical Materials Use Restricted; President Order for Strategic and Critical Materials Utilization
50 U.S.C. § 5 ~	Purchases of American Materials; Period Allowed for Production and Delivery from Domestic Source
50 U.S.C. § 6 ~	Appropriation Authorized, Fiscal Years 1939-1943
50 U.S.C. § 7 ~	Investigations of Development Domestic Mineral Resources; Treatment and Utilization of Lower Grade Reserves, Substitutes, etc. Funds Authorized for Fiscal Years 1940-1943; Specific Bureau Allotments

== U.S. Presidential Authorizations and Statements of Declarations ==
- Roosevelt, Franklin D. (February 13, 1940). "Franklin D. Roosevelt: "Letter on Appropriations for Strategic War Materials" - February 13, 1940". The American Presidency Project. University of California - Santa Barbara.
- Roosevelt, Franklin D. (July 2, 1940). "Franklin D. Roosevelt: "Proclamation No. 2413 - Prohibiting Unlicensed Export of War Materials and Strategic Raw Products" - July 2, 1940". The American Presidency Project. University of California - Santa Barbara.
- Roosevelt, Franklin D. (September 29, 1944). "The President, in a Letter to the Foreign Economic Administration, Defines Certain Policies to Be Followed After Defeat of Germany - September 29, 1944". Internet Archive. Washington, D.C.: National Archives and Records Service. pp. 295–298.
- Truman, Harry S. (July 23, 1946). "Statement by the President Upon Signing the Strategic and Critical Materials Stockpiling Act - July 23, 1946". Internet Archive. Washington, D.C.: National Archives and Records Service. pp. 353–354.
- Johnson, Lyndon B. (November 18, 1965). "Memorandum Approving the Release of Copper From the National Stockpile - November 18, 1965". Internet Archive. Washington, D.C.: National Archives and Records Service. p. 1119.
- Carter, Jimmy E. (September 10, 1979). "Executive Order 12155 - Strategic and Critical Materials - September 10, 1979". Internet Archive. Washington, D.C.: National Archives and Records Service. pp. 1620–1621.
- Reagan, Ronald W. (March 13, 1981). "Statement on the National Defense Stockpile of Strategic and Critical Materials - March 13, 1981". Internet Archive. Washington, D.C.: National Archives and Records Service. p. 242.
- Reagan, Ronald W. (May 2, 1983). "Executive Order 12417 - Strategic and Critical Materials - May 2, 1983". Internet Archive. Washington, D.C.: National Archives and Records Service. p. 632.

== Amendments and Authorizations to Strategic and Critical Materials Act, 1939 ==
Amendments and authorization extensions to the Strategic and Critical Materials Stock Piling Act.

U.S. Statutes related to Amendments and Law Citation Revisions

Date of Enactment	Public Law No.	U.S. Statute	U.S. Bill No.	U.S. Presidential Administration
July 23, 1946	P.L. 79-520	60 Stat. 596	S. 752	Harry S. Truman
September 21, 1961	P.L. 87-269	75 Stat. 566	H.R. 7447	John F. Kennedy
September 28, 1962	P.L. 87-720	76 Stat. 666	H.R. 12416	John F. Kennedy
April 9, 1963	P.L. 88-8	77 Stat. 6	S. 1089	John F. Kennedy
July 14, 1964	P.L. 88-373	78 Stat. 318	H.R. 11257	Lyndon B. Johnson
July 14, 1964	P.L. 88-374	78 Stat. 319	H.R. 11004	Lyndon B. Johnson
November 17, 1971	P.L. 92-156	85 Stat. 423	H.R. 8687	Richard M. Nixon
July 30, 1979	P.L. 96-41	93 Stat. 319	H.R. 2154	Jimmy E. Carter
December 29, 1979	P.L. 96-175	93 Stat. 1289	H.R. 595	Jimmy E. Carter

== See also ==
☆ Byrd Amendment (1971)	☆ National Strategic and Critical Minerals Production Act of 2013
☆ Defense Logistics Agency	☆ Strategic National Stockpile
☆ Defense National Stockpile Center	☆ War Assets Administration
☆ Foreign Economic Administration	☆ War reserve stock

== Strategic and Critical Materials Informational Resources ==
♦ "Current List of Strategic and Critical Materials for Stockpiling" [Materials Memorandum V-1 ~ D457691]. Internet Archive. Washington, D.C.: U.S. Government Printing Office. October 3, 1955.
♦ Penner, Peter S.; Spek, Jaap K. (May 1976). "Stockpile Optimization: Energy and Versatility Considerations for Strategic and Critical Materials". Internet Archive. University of Illinois at Urbana - Champaign.
♦ "Strategic and Critical Materials Stock Piling Act Revision" [Hearing on H.R. 2154 ... before the Seapower and Strategic and Critical Materials Subcommittee of the Committee on Armed Services, House of Representatives, Ninety-Sixth Congress, First Session]. HathiTrust Digital Library. Washington, D.C.: U.S. Government Printing Office. February 23, 1979.
♦ "Strategic and Critical Materials Stock Piling Act Revision" [Hearing Before the Subcommittee on Military Construction and Stockpiles of the Committee on Armed Services, United States Senate, Ninety-Sixth Congress, First Session, on S. 290]. Internet Archive. Washington, D.C.: U.S. Government Printing Office. March 19, 1979.
♦ "DTIC ADA116716: The United States Strategic Stockpile of Critical Minerals and Our National Security". Internet Archive. Defense Technical Information Center. April 1, 1982.
♦ Gentleman, Susan M. (January 10, 1985). "Strategic Minerals and Materials". Internet Archive. Ottawa, Canada: Library of Parliament.
♦ "DTIC ADA361579: Strategic and Critical Materials Report to the Congress" [Operations Under the Strategic and Critical Materials Stock Piling Act During the Period October 1997 through September 1998]. Internet Archive. Defense Technical Information Center. 1998.
♦ "A: Stockpile History" [Managing Materials for a Twenty-first Century Military]. National Academies of Sciences, Engineering, and Medicine. Washington, D.C.: National Academies Press. 2008. pp. 133–144.
