= Harry Byrd of Virginia =

Harry Byrd of Virginia is a non-fiction book, published in 1996 by University Press of Virginia by Ronald L. Heinemann, concerning Harry F. Byrd.

James R. Sweeney of Old Dominion University wrote that the author "portrays Byrd as an unrelenting negativist whose convictions remained fixed as the world around him changed", and that overall the work is an "unflattering portrait of an essentially humorless and defensive" individual, although Heinemann also viewed Byrd as having, in Sweeney's words, "integrity".

== Reception ==
William A. Link of University of North Carolina, Greensboro wrote that the book "is a carefully written, fully documented study" that has "terse, well-considered, and balanced judgments."

Sweeney wrote that the book is "a major contribution to the literature on American politics."
