= National Strategic and Critical Minerals Production Act =

National Strategic and Critical Minerals Production Act of 2013
- Long title: To require the Secretary of the Interior and the Secretary of Agriculture to more efficiently develop domestic sources of the minerals and mineral materials of strategic and critical importance to United States economic and national security and manufacturing competitiveness.
- Announced in: the 113th United States Congress
- Sponsored by: Rep. Mark E. Amodei (R, NV-2)
- Number of co-sponsors: 28

Codification
- Acts affected: National Environmental Policy Act of 1969
- U.S.C. sections affected: 5 U.S.C. § 702, 5 U.S.C. § 504, 28 U.S.C. § 2412
- Agencies affected: United States Congress, United States Department of Agriculture, United States Forest Service, United States Department of the Interior, Bureau of Land Management,

[H.R. 761 Legislative history]
- Introduced in the House as H.R. 761 by Rep. Mark Amodei (R-NV) on February 15, 2013; Committee consideration by United States House Committee on the Judiciary, United States House Judiciary Subcommittee on Regulatory Reform, Commercial and Antitrust Law, United States House Committee on Natural Resources, United States House Natural Resources Subcommittee on Energy and Mineral Resources

The National Strategic and Critical Minerals Production Act of 2013 (H.R. 761) is a bill that was introduced into the United States House of Representatives during the 113th United States Congress. The bill would alter the rules and regulations surrounding getting permits/permission to undertake mining projects in the United States. The bill would also alter that legal framework associated with this type of mining.

== Provisions of the bill ==
This summary is based largely on the summary provided by the Congressional Research Service, a public domain source.

The National Strategic and Critical Minerals Production Act of 2013 would deem a domestic mine that will provide strategic and critical minerals to be an "infrastructure project" as described in the Presidential Order "Improving Performance of Federal Permitting and Review of Infrastructure Projects" dated March 22, 2012.

The bill would set forth the responsibilities of the lead agency (federal, state, local, tribal, or Alaska Native Corporation) with responsibility for issuing a mineral exploration or mine permit with respect to project coordination, agency consultation, project proponents, contractors, and the status and scope of any environmental impact statement. It would require that lead agency to determine that any such action would not constitute a major federal action significantly affecting the quality of the human environment within the meaning of the National Environmental Policy Act of 1969 (NEPA) if the procedural and substantive safeguards of the lead agency's permitting process alone, any applicable state permitting process alone, or a combination of the two processes together provide an adequate mechanism to ensure that environmental factors are taken into account.

The bill would require the lead agency's project lead, at a project proponent's request, to enter into an agreement with the project proponent and other cooperating agencies that sets time limits for each part of the permit review process.

The bill would make these new rules retroactive by request, by applying the new rules to a mineral exploration or mine permit for which an application was submitted before enactment of H.R. 761 (if enacted) if the applicant so requests in writing. It then requires the lead agency to begin implementing the National Strategic and Critical Minerals Production Act of 2013 with respect to such application within 30 days after receiving such a request.

The bill would require the lead agency, with respect to strategic and critical materials within a federally administered unit of the National Forest System, to: (1) exempt from federal regulations governing Special Areas all areas of identified mineral resources in Land Use Designations (other than Non-Development Land Use Designations); (2) apply such exemption to all additional routes and areas that the agency finds necessary to facilitate the construction, operation, maintenance, and restoration of the areas of the identified mineral resources; and (3) continue to apply such exemptions after approval of the Minerals Plan of Operations for the unit.

The bill then declares that the priority of the lead agency is to maximize mineral resource development while mitigating environmental impacts, so that more of the mineral resource can be brought to the market place.

The bill prescribes the Federal Register notice process for mineral exploration and mining projects.

The National Strategic and Critical Minerals Production Act of 2013 would authorize the holder of a mineral exploration or mine permit to intervene as of right in any covered civil action by a person affecting rights or obligations of the permit holder under the permit. It also bars a civil action claiming legal wrong caused by an agency action unless it is filed by the end of the 60-day period beginning on the date of the final federal agency action to which it relates. It would require the court to hear and determine any covered civil action as expeditiously as possible. It prohibits the court, in a covered civil action, from granting or approving prospective relief unless it finds that such relief is narrowly drawn, extends no further than necessary to correct the violation of a legal requirement, and is the least intrusive means necessary to correct such violation. It declares inapplicable to such a civil action specified requirements of the Equal Access to Justice Act relating to award of costs and fees to a prevailing plaintiff. Finally, the bill would prohibit payment from the federal government for court costs of a party in such a civil action, including attorneys’ fees and expenses.

== Congressional Budget office report ==
The Congressional Budget Office (CBO) estimates that implementing H.R. 761 would have no significant impact on the federal budget. Enacting the bill could reduce mandatory payments for attorneys’ fees over the 2014–2023 period; therefore, pay-as-you-go procedures apply. However, the CBO estimates that any such effects would be minimal. Enacting the bill would not affect revenues.

The bill would require the Bureau of Land Management (BLM) and the United States Forest Service to take certain actions aimed at streamlining the process for obtaining permits to extract minerals from federal lands. Based on information from the affected agencies, CBO estimates that the streamlining provisions would have no significant budgetary effect because those agencies are performing most of those activities under current law. The bill also would direct the agencies to expedite the publishing of notices in the Federal Register related to mineral exploration and mining projects. Based on information provided by the BLM, the CBO estimates that implementing that provision would cost less than $300,000 a year, assuming availability of appropriated funds. Those funds would be used to hire additional employees to allow the affected agencies to meet the timelines established in the bill.

Finally, H.R. 761 would exempt lawsuits that affect mineral exploration or mining permits on federal lands from the Equal Access to Justice Act. That act requires the U.S. Treasury to pay the attorneys’ fees for certain plaintiffs who prevail in court proceedings against the federal government. Over the 2003–2012 period, total payments made on behalf of the BLM and the Forest Service from the Judgment Fund of the U.S. Treasury to cover attorneys’ fees under that act averaged about $1 million a year. Based on information from the Government Accountability Office, the Treasury Department, and the affected land management agencies, the CBO estimates that only a small portion of that amount was paid to plaintiffs who prevailed in cases that affected mineral exploration or mining permits. The CBO estimates that enacting H.R. 761 would reduce direct spending by less than $50,000 a year over the 2014–2023 period.

H.R. 761 contains no intergovernmental or private-sector mandates as defined in the Unfunded Mandates Reform Act and would not affect the budgets of state, local, or tribal governments.

== Procedural history ==
Congress	Short title	Bill number(s)	Date introduced	Sponsor(s)	# of cosponsors	Latest status
112th Congress	National Strategic and Critical Minerals Production Act of 2012	H.R. 4402	April 19, 2012	Mark Amodei (R-NV)	27	Passed House (256-160)
113th Congress	National Strategic and Critical Minerals Production Act of 2013	H.R. 761	February 15, 2013	Mark Amodei (R-NV)	57	Passed House (246-178)
114th Congress	National Strategic and Critical Minerals Production Act of 2015	H.R. 1937	April 22, 2015	Mark Amodei (R-NV)	48	Passed House (254-177)
115th Congress	National Strategic and Critical Minerals Production Act	H.R. 520	January 13, 2017	Mark Amodei (R-NV)	36	Died in committee
115th Congress	National Strategic and Critical Minerals Production Act	S. 145	January 12, 2017	Dean Heller (R-NV)	2	Died in committee
116th Congress	National Strategic and Critical Minerals Production Act	H.R. 2531	May 7, 2019	Mark Amodei (R-NV)	38	Died in committee
117th Congress	National Strategic and Critical Minerals Production Act of 2021	H.R. 3240	May 14, 2021	Mark Amodei (R-NV)	14	Referred to committee

=== House ===
The National Strategic and Critical Minerals Production Act of 2013 was introduced into the House on February 15, 2013 by Rep. Mark Amodei (R-NV). It was referred to both the United States House Committee on the Judiciary and the United States House Committee on Natural Resources. On March 1, 2013, the bill was referred to the United States House Natural Resources Subcommittee on Energy and Mineral Resources, which held a hearing about the bill on March 21, 2013, before finally discharging the bill back to the main Committee on May 15. The full House Natural Resources Committee held a markup session about the bill on May 15, 2013 and then ordered the bill to be Reported (Amended) by the Yeas and Nays: 24 – 17. The House Judiciary Committee referred the National Strategic and Critical Minerals Production Act of 2013 to the United States House Judiciary Subcommittee on Regulatory Reform, Commercial and Antitrust Law on April 8, 2013. On July 8, 2013, the bill was discharged by the Judiciary Committee, reported (amended) by the House Natural Resources Committee (alongside House Report 113-138 pt 1), and placed on Union Calendar 100. The House Majority Leader Eric Cantor placed the bill on the House Schedule on September 13, 2013 for consideration under a suspension of the rules on September 17.

== Debate and discussion ==
According to the National Journal, the National Strategic and Critical Minerals Production Act of 2013 appeals to conservatives because it should streamline the process for mining on federal land and because the changes it makes will not cost the government additional money.

The Patagonia Area Resource Alliance asked its supporters to oppose the bill, due to their belief that the bill fails to protect the public interest. The organization argues that (1) most mining is being done by foreign companies, who will not be paying appropriate royalties to the federal government under the new law; (2) that an old mining law – the General Mining Act of 1872 – should be rewritten instead; and (3) that the National Strategic and Critical Minerals Production Act of 2013 would place too many restrictions on legal actions that could be taken against federal agencies when they fail to do their jobs properly, by adding time limits for actions and limits on damages.

== See also ==
- List of bills in the 113th United States Congress
- Mineral
