= Henry Byrd (American football) =

American football player (born 1999)

No. 68 – Minnesota Vikings
- Position: Guard
- Roster status: Practice squad

Personal information
- Born: July 1, 1999 (age 27); Nashville, Tennessee, U.S.
- Listed height: 6 ft 5 in (1.96 m)
- Listed weight: 314 lb (142 kg)

Career information
- High school: The Ensworth (Nashville, Tennessee)
- College: Princeton (2018–2022)
- NFL draft: 2023: undrafted

Career history
- Denver Broncos (2023)*; Minnesota Vikings (2023)*; San Francisco 49ers (2023)*; Minnesota Vikings (2023–present)
- * Offseason or practice squad member only

Awards and highlights
- First-team All-Ivy League (2021, 2022); Second-team All-Ivy League (2019); All-ECAC (2022); Donold B. Lourie Award (2018)

Career NFL statistics as of 2025
- Games played: 2
- Stats at Pro Football Reference

Henry Byrd (born July 1, 1999) is an American professional football guard for the Minnesota Vikings of the National Football League (NFL). He played college football for the Princeton Tigers, earning all-Ivy honors in 2019, 2021, and 2022. Byrd was signed by the Denver Broncos as an undrafted free agent in 2023.

== Early life ==
Byrd grew up in Nashville, Tennessee and attended The Ensworth School. He was a three-sport athlete competing in lacrosse, football and basketball. In basketball, he played together with James Wiseman. He also was a tap dancer and competed in Dance for Athletes 1 and Dance for Athletes 2.

== College ==
Byrd played college football from 2018 to 2022 for the Princeton Tigers, earning All-Ivy League First Team honors in 2021 and 2022 and a Second-Team All-Ivy in 2019. In 2018, he received the Donold B. Lourie Award as the top offensive freshman.. In 2022, he was named to the FCS All-American Third Team.

== Professional career ==
Pre-draft measurables
Height	Weight	Arm length	Hand span	Wingspan	40-yard dash	10-yard split	20-yard split	20-yard shuttle	Three-cone drill	Vertical jump	Broad jump	Bench press
6 ft 4 7/8 in (1.95 m)	310 lb (141 kg)	33 5/8 in (0.85 m)	9 1/2 in (0.24 m)	6 ft 10 1/8 in (2.09 m)	5.21 s	1.79 s	2.90 s	4.67 s	7.80 s	33 in (0.84 m)	9 ft 7 in (2.92 m)	32 reps
All values from Pro Day

=== Denver Broncos ===
After going undrafted in the 2023 NFL draft, Byrd signed as an undrafted free agent with the Denver Broncos. He was released by the Broncos on August 29.

=== Minnesota Vikings ===
On August 31, 2023, Byrd was signed by the Minnesota Vikings to the team's practice squad, where he stayed until he was cut on November 4.

=== San Francisco 49ers ===
Byrd was signed to the practice squad by the San Francisco 49ers on November 7, 2023. He was released by San Francisco on November 28.

=== Minnesota Vikings (second stint) ===
On December 23, 2023, Byrd was signed back to the Minnesota Vikings' practice squad where he stayed for the remainder of the 2023 NFL season. On January 8, 2024, he signed a future contract with the Vikings.

Byrd was waived by the Vikings on August 27, 2024, and re-signed to the practice squad. He signed a reserve/future contract with Minnesota on January 16, 2025.

On August 26, 2025, Byrd was waived by the Vikings as part of final roster cuts. He was signed to the team's practice squad the next day. He was signed to active roster on a two-year deal on December 24.

On August 30, 2026, Byrd was waived by the Vikings once again as a part of final roster cuts. He was re–signed to the Vikings' practice squad the next day.

== Family ==
Henry’s father, William “Big Will” Byrd, played college football for Vanderbilt. He left the program to work as the tour manager for Bruce Springsteen. He went on to have a career in show business, including playing a role in Sweet Dreams, the 1985 film about Patsy Cline, after auditioning as a prank on a casting agent. Will also had a close relationship with Dolly Parton from serving on her management team for many years. In his retirement, he played an active role as a PA announcer at Henry’s high school games, through which he became known for playing show tunes over the loud speaker during timeouts.
