= Bulova (surname) =

Bulova is a surname. Notable people with the surname include:

- David Bulova (born 1969), American politician
- Gretchen Bulova (fl. 2026), American politician
- Sharon Bulova (born 1947), American politician

== See also ==
- Bulova
