= Earl A. Fitzpatrick =

American politician

Member of the Virginia Senate from the Roanoke district
- In office January 1948 – January 1960
- Preceded by: Leonard G. Muse
- Succeeded by: William B. Hopkins

Member of the Virginia House of Delegates from the Roanoke, Virginia district
- In office January, 1938 – January 1948
- Preceded by: Marion S. Battle
- Succeeded by: James Adam Bear

Personal details
- Born: September 22, 1904 Roanoke, Virginia, US
- Died: June 22, 1984 (aged 79) Roanoke, Virginia, US
- Party: Democratic
- Spouse: Mary Linn Petty
- Education: Washington and Lee University
- Profession: Lawyer

Earl Abbath Fitzpatrick (September 22, 1904 – June 22, 1984) was a Virginia lawyer and member of the Virginia General Assembly representing Roanoke between 1940 and 1959, first as a delegate and then as a state Senator. A lieutenant in the Byrd Organization, Fitzpatrick was active in the Massive Resistance to racial integration vowed by U.S. Senator Harry F. Byrd after the U.S. Supreme Court decisions in Brown v. Board of Education. He introduced much of the segregationist legislation and was vice-chairman of the Boatwright Committee which investigated the NAACP for litigating on behalf of civil rights, before being defeated in the 1959 Democratic primary.

== Early and family life ==
Fitzpatrick was born in Roanoke to Frank Abbath and Maggie Thomas Fitzpatrick. The family included two brothers, Horace S. Fitzpatrick (1913 - 1990) and Beverly Thomas Fitzpatrick (1919-2000), and a sister, Margaret Elizabeth Fitzpatrick Mayes (1906 - 1984). Beverly Fitzpatrick followed in his elder brother's footsteps at Jefferson High School and Washington and Lee University in Lexington, Virginia and in becoming a lawyer, but served in the U.S. Navy during World War II and became a judge. Earl Fitzpatrick married Mary Linn Petty (1905-2002) and was active in the Presbyterian Church.

== Political career ==
Fitzpatrick served as Roanoke's city attorney from until . In 1935, Roanoke's voters had elected Marion S. Battle and Raye O. Lawson to serve as their delegates in the Virginia General Assembly, but Lawson was not certified by the Committee on Privileges and elections in the extra session, so his seat remained vacant. In 1937 Fitzpatrick and Walter H. Scott won election to the Virginia General Assembly as the two delegates allotted Roanoke. Both were re-elected in 1939 and 1941; Walter W. Wood replaced Scott and served as Roanoke's delegate alongside Fitzpatrick in 1943 and 1945.

In 1947, Fitzpatrick won election in the relatively new Virginia Senate District 36 (representing Roanoke City). He replaced independent Democrat Leonard G. Muse (what the Byrd Organization called an "Anti", meaning Anti-Byrd Organization). Beginning in January 1936, Muse had previously served over a decade, mostly alongside Byrd Democrat Harvey B. Apperson of Salem, Virginia (seat of Roanoke County) in the 21st District, which then had two seats and encompassed Radford as well as Franklin, Montgomery and Roanoke Counties. When District 36 was created in 1943 to cover the City of Roanoke, Muse had been elected to the seat, but Fitzpatrick denied him re-election four years later, and he was appointed to the Virginia School Board. Apperson failed to qualify in the contested 1943 senatorial election for District 21, but was his fellow delegates selected him to serve as a judge on the Virginia State Corporation Commission; in the special election that followed, Republican Ted Dalton of Radford was elected as District 21's senator, and re-elected several times. Roanoke City is now again in District 21, along with Giles County and parts of Roanoke and Montgomery Counties. In any event, upon his election, Fitzpatrick sat in the Virginia Senate next to the Byrd Organization's heir-apparent, Harry F. Byrd, Jr., who was also first elected there in 1948 and represented Winchester, Virginia together with its surrounding counties (and served there until his father retired from the U.S. Senate). Fitzpatrick was re-elected as Roanoke City's senator in 1951 and 1955, although in the latter election the Roanoke City senatorial district was renamed District 35.

=== Massive Resistance and Roanoke ===
As part of Massive Resistance, the Virginia General Assembly passed the Stanley Plan in September 1956, which included provisions for pupil placement boards, as well as to close any school that integrated, even pursuant to a court order. Dalton became a leading opponent of school closures, while Fitzpatrick followed the Byrd/Stanley strategy.

Roanoke had always considered itself more progressive than, for example, Prince Edward County, whose schools were a companion case to Brown. Roanoke's school board already had an African American member, Dr. Lylburn Downing, and it had recently built Lucy Addison High School and several elementary schools for its African-American community. However, the quality of those facilities was worse than those for white children, with some schools overcrowded, some heated only by wood stoves and/or lacking indoor plumbing as well as cafeterias and auditoriums. In January 1956 over NAACP opposition, Virginia's voters approved an amendment to the state constitution which allowed tuition grants to private schools (which became known as segregation academies). In early 1956, the Roanoke NAACP local's new president, attorney Reuben Lawsen, sent the Roanoke School Board a letter demanding desegregation. The school board delayed, then in 1958 proposed to issue bonds to construct new schools and improve facilities, which required voter approval. The school bond market by then was terrible because the Stanley Plan implemented in the fall of 1956 included not only provisions closing any school that integrated, it also established an expensive system of vouchers supporting segregation academies for parents who did not wish their children to attend integrated schools.

On February 18, 1958, the General Assembly passed (and Governor Almond signed) additional legislation protecting segregation, what the Byrd Organization called the "Little Rock Bill" (responding to President Eisenhower's use of federal powers to assist the court-ordered desegregation of schools in Little Rock, Arkansas, allowing the governor to permanently shut down schools policed by federal authority or near such a school). As the legislation's sponsor, Fitzpatrick watched as Governor Almond signed it into law.

=== Anti-NAACP laws and the Boatwright Committee ===
In addition to the pupil placement, school closure and school voucher laws overtly supporting segregation, the Stanley Plan included seven laws expanding the common law legal offenses of champerty, maintenance, barratry, running and capping, as well as the statutory violation of unauthorized practice of law. In early 1957, Virginia's legislative leaders appointed two committees to carry out those new laws and investigate the NAACP, which was pursuing the legal cases to desegregate Virginia schools. The President of the Virginia Senate appointed Fitzpatrick (who became Vice-Chairman of the new Committee on Offenses against the Administration of Justice) and E. Almer Ames Jr. of Onancock; the Speaker of the House of Delegates appointed John B. Boatwright to chair the committee, with William F. Stone and J. J. Williams Jr. as members. Shortly after the session began in January 1957, the Boatwright committee issued letters requesting information from the NAACP, as well as the Defenders of State Sovereignty and Individual Liberties and other segregationist organizations, and the next month began subpoenaing NAACP membership lists. These activities prompted litigation (NAACP motions to quash the subpoenas) in Richmond and several Virginia counties. In March 1957, the Boatwright Committee opined that various segregationist organizations did not commit the newly expanded legal offenses of champerty, maintenance, barratry, running and capping, nor the unauthorized practice of law.

The commission's first report, issued November 13, 1957, recommended enforcement of those new laws against specific NAACP lawyers, whom it named. The subpoenas and other activities soon reduced NAACP membership in Virginia by half. Two years later (after Fitzpatrick's defeat in the Democratic primary and with Stone remaining on the committee after his elevation to the Senate) the commission issued another report, that complained that the Virginia State Bar was not punishing those lawyers but instead spending $5000 on a Jamestown commemoration and $6350 on a new continuing legal education program.

=== Massive Resistance ends and 1959 primary defeat ===
Meanwhile, on January 19, 1959, both a three-judge federal panel and the Virginia Supreme Court declared the Stanley Plan unconstitutional. The NAACP's actions contesting the Boatwright Committee's investigation of its attorneys, as well as similar cases concerning the Thomson Committee (also established in the Stanley Plan and merged into the Boatwright Committee in 1959), also wound their way through the courts. In May 1959, the U.S. Supreme Court in Scull v. Virginia ex rel. Committee on Law Reform & Racial Activities unanimously overturned the contempt conviction of a Quaker printer hauled before the Thomsen Committee. The following month, the U.S. Supreme Court issued Harrison v. NAACP, sending back the first of the NAACP cases, so that the Virginia Supreme Court could first interpret the new laws.

In the July 14, 1959 Democratic primary, Roanoke City Democratic Committee Chairman, fellow lawyer and former Marine William B. Hopkins, defeated Fitzpatrick. By August, Roanoke's school board announced its withdrawal from the segregationist Virginia Education Association, and three African American students were assigned to white schools, although the pupil assignment board refused to assign several other African American children whose parents requested transfer to white schools. When Hopkins assumed the Senate seat in January 1960, he began fighting to repeal the poll tax. Hopkins won re-election numerous times, and later led a commission to reorganize and modernize Virginia's state government.

In 1960, as Fitzpatrick returned to private practice, the NAACP filed Cynthia Greene v. School Board of Roanoke City, and soon Marsh v. County School Board of Roanoke County and another case involving Pulaski County schools, all of which wound their way through the federal courts as Roanoke's and the other school boards continued passive resistance strategies. Several Roanoke schools integrated peacefully in September 1960, although others did not. Judge Simon Sobeloff of the Fourth Circuit ordered Roanoke's schools to integrate.

Meanwhile, because the Virginia Supreme Court only struck down one of the six new ethics laws, the NAACP case went back to the U.S. Supreme Court, and was argued twice. In the interim, the Virginia Bar attempted to prosecute NAACP attorney Samuel W. Tucker, but a circuit judge in Emporia, Virginia (in southeast Virginia) threw out that case in 1962. In January 1963, the U. S. Supreme Court in NAACP v. Button (1963), by a 6 to 3 majority struck down the remainder of the Stanley Plan's revised legal ethics laws. Roanoke's schools finally integrated in 1964.

=== Further public service ===
From 1965 until 1973, as the Byrd Organization disintegrated, Fitzpatrick represented the Salem District on the Virginia Highway Department Board, replacing S. Sutton Flythe of Martinsville.

== Death and legacy ==
Fitzpatrick died and was buried in Roanoke in 1984. His son (or nephew) Bev Fitzpatrick served multiple terms on the Roanoke City Council and three terms as vice mayor, as well as on the New Century Council and has led the Virginia Museum of Transportation since 2006.

== See also ==
Brian J. Daugherity, Keep on Keeping On: the NAACP and the Implementation of Brown v. Board of Education in Virginia (Charlottesville: University of Virginia Press, 2016)

Virginia House of Delegates
| Preceded by Marion S. Battle | Virginia Delegate for Roanoke; 1938–1948 | Succeeded by James Adam Bear |
Senate of Virginia
| Preceded by Leonard G. Muse | Virginia Senator for Roanoke District; 1948–1960 | Succeeded by William B. Hopkins |
