= Senator Apperson =

Senator Apperson may refer to:

- Harvey B. Apperson (1890–1948), Virginia State Senate
- John T. Apperson (1834–1917), Oregon State Senate
