= Bibliography of the Battle of Saipan =

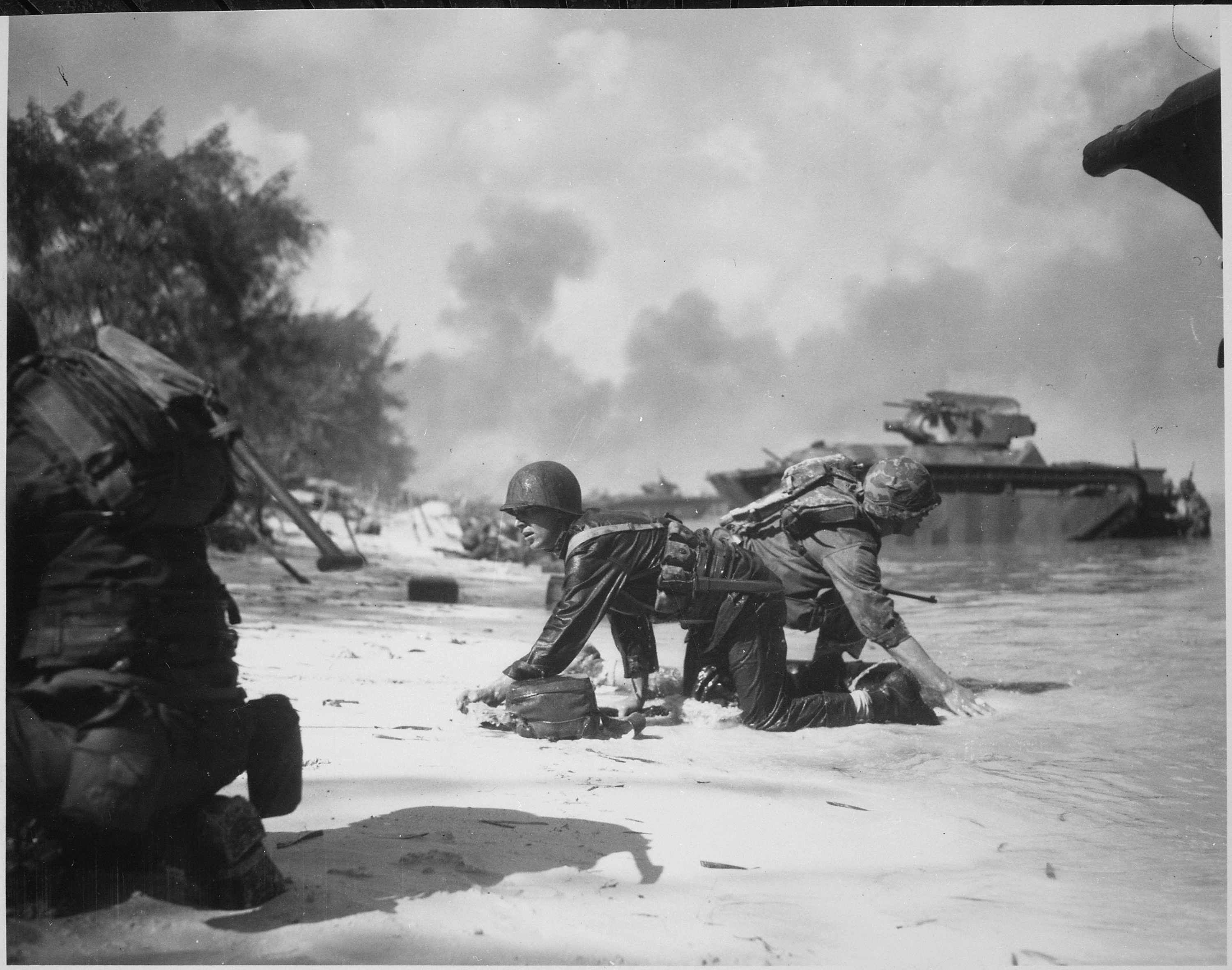
Marines on a beach in Saipan under fire, 15 June 1944

The following is a list of resources related to the Battle of Saipan. It includes studies focused on the battle, as well as general works about the Marianas Campaign and the Pacific War that discuss the battle in depth.

== Books ==
- Astroth, Alexander (2019). Mass Suicides on Saipan and Tinian, 1944: An Examination of the Civilian Deaths in Historical Context. McFarland. ISBN 9781476674568. OCLC 1049791315.
- Bright, Richard Carl (2007). Pain and Purpose in the Pacific: True Reports Of War. Trafford Publishing. ISBN 978-1-4251-2544-8.
- Brooks, Victor (2005). Hell Is Upon Us: D-Day in the Pacific, June–August 1944. Da Capo Press. ISBN 9780306813696. OCLC 61211333.
- Chapin, John C. (1994). The Battle for Saipan. Washington D.C.: United States Marine Corps Historical Division. PCN 19000312300.
- Crowl, Philip A. (1993) [1960]. Campaign in the Marianas. United States Army in World War II, The War in the Pacific. Vol. 9. Center of Military History, United States Army. OCLC 1049152860. Part Two, Chapters III–XII focus on Saipan.
- Denfeld, D. Colt (1997). Hold the Marianas: The Japanese Defense of the Mariana Islands. White Mane Pub. ISBN 1-57249-014-4.
- Gailey, Harry A. (1986). Howlin' Mad Vs. the Army: Conflict in Command, Saipan 1944. Presidio Press. ISBN 0-89141-242-5. OCLC 13124368.
- Goldberg, Harold J. (2007). D-Day in the Pacific: The Battle of Saipan. Indiana University Press, 2007. ISBN 978-0-253-34869-2. OCLC 73742593.
- Hallas, James H. (2019). Saipan: The Battle That Doomed Japan in World War II. Stackpole. ISBN 9780811768436. OCLC 1052877312.
- Harmsen, Peter (2021). War in the Far East: Asian Armageddon 1944–1945. Vol. 3. Casemate. ISBN 9781612006277. OCLC 1202754434. Chapters 3 and 4 focus on the Battle of the Philippine Sea and Saipan.
- Heinrichs, Waldo H.; Gallicchio, Marc (2017). "The Marianas Campaign, June–August 1944". Implacable Foes: War in the Pacific, 1944–1945. Oxford University Press. ISBN 9780190616755. OCLC 962442415.
- Hoffman, Carl W. (1950). Saipan: The Beginning of the End. Historical Branch, United States Marine Corps. OCLC 564000243.
- Hopkins, William B. (2008). "The Marianas". The Pacific War: The Strategy, Politics, and Players That Won the War. Zenith. ISBN 9780760334355. OCLC 1311044045.
- Hornfischer, James D. (2016). The Fleet at Flood Tide: The U.S. at Total War in the Pacific, 1944–1945. Random House Publishing Group. ISBN 978-0345548726. Chapters 9–24 focus on Saipan.
- Jones, Don (1986). Oba, The Last Samurai. Presidio Press. ISBN 0-89141-245-X. OCLC 13847435.
- Lacey, Sharon T. (2013). "Saipan: Smith Versus Smith". Pacific Blitzkrieg: World War II in the Central Pacific. University of North Texas Press. ISBN 9781574415254. OCLC 861200312.
- Love, Edmund G. (1982). The 27th Infantry Division in World War II. Battery Press. ISBN 978-0898390568.
- Manchester, William (1980). Goodbye, Darkness A Memoir of the Pacific War. Boston – Toronto: Little, Brown and Co. ISBN 0-316-54501-5.
- McManus, John C. (2021). "Triumph and Tragedy". Island Infernos. Penguin. ISBN 9780451475060. OCLC 1260166257.
- Morison, Samuel Eliot (1981) [1953]. New Guinea and the Marianas, March 1944–August 1944. History of United States Naval Operations in World War II. Vol. 8. Little Brown. ISBN 9780316583084. OCLC 10926173. Chapters XI–XVIII are focused on The Battle of the Philippine Sea and Saipan.
- O'Brien, Francis A. (2003). Battling for Saipan. Presidio Press. ISBN 0-89141-804-0.
- Olson, James C.; Mortensen, Bernhardt L. (1983) [1950]. "The Marianas". In Craven, Wesley F.; Cate, James L. (eds.). The Pacific: Gauadalcanal to Saipan, August 1942 to July 1944. The Army Air Forces in World War II. Vol. 4. pp. 671–696. ISBN 9780912799032. OCLC 9828710.
- Petty, Bruce M. (2001). Saipan: Oral Histories of the Pacific War. McFarland and Company. ISBN 0-7864-0991-6.
- Rottman, Gordon; Howard Gerrard (2004). Saipan & Tinian 1944: Piercing the Japanese Empire. Osprey Publishing. ISBN 1-84176-804-9.
- Sauer, Howard (1999). "Torpedoed at Saipan". The Last Big-Gun Naval Battle: The Battle of Surigao Strait. Palo Alto, California: The Glencannon Press. ISBN 1-889901-08-3. – Firsthand account of naval gunfire support by a crewmember of USS Maryland.
- Shaw, Henry I. Jr.; Nalty, Bernard C.; Turnbladh, Edwin T. (1989) [1966]. Central Pacific Drive. History of U.S. Marine Corps Operations in World War II. Vol. 3. Historical Branch, G–3 Division, Headquarters, U. S. Marine Corps. ISBN 9780898391947. OCLC 927428034. Part IV, Chapters 1–6 focus on Saipan.
- Sloan, Bill (2017). Their Backs against the Sea: The Battle of Saipan and the Largest Banzai Attack of World War II. Da Capo Press. ISBN 978-0306824715.
- Tachovsky, Joseph (2020). 40 Thieves on Saipan: The Elite Marine Scout-Snipers in One of WWII's Bloodiest Battles. Regnery History. ISBN 978-1684510481.
- Toland, John (2003) [1970]. The Rising Sun: The Decline and Fall of the Japanese Empire 1936–1945. Random House. ISBN 9780812968583. OCLC 52441692. Part V, Chapters 18–20 examine the Marianas Campaign and the Battle of Saipan.
- Toll, Ian W. (2015). The Conquering Tide: War in the Pacific Islands, 1942–1944. W. W. Norton. ISBN 978-0393080643. OCLC 902661305. Chapters thirteen and fourteen focus on the Marianas Campaign and the Battle of Saipan.
- United States War Department Historical Division (1991) [1946]. "The Fight on Tanapag Plain: 27th Division, 6 July 1944". Small Unit Actions– France: 2d Ranger Battalion at Pointe du Hoe; Saipan: 27th Division on Tanapag Plain; Italy: 351st Infantry at Santa Maria Infante; France: 4th Armored Division at Singling. War Department, Historical Division. pp. 69–113. OCLC 519761473.

== Journal articles and reports ==
- Hughes, Matthew (2010). "When soldiers kill civilians: The battle for Saipan, 1944". History Today. 60 (2): 42–48. Archived from the original on 27 Jan 2010.
- Kaune, Charles S. (1990). The National Guard in War: An Historical Analysis of the 27th Infantry Divisions (New York National Guard) in World War II (Master's thesis). Columbus College – via Defense Technical Information Center.
- Trefalt, Beatrice (2018). "The Battle of Saipan in Japanese civilian memoirs: non-combatants, soldiers and the complexities of surrender". Journal of Pacific History. 53 (3): 3. doi:10.1080/00223344.2018.1491300 – via academia.edu.
- Sheeks, Robert B. (1945). "Civilians in Saipan". Far Eastern Survey. 14 (2): 109–113. doi:10.2307/3022063. JSTOR 3022063.
- Schmidt, Harry (1944). Report of Marianas Operation Phase I (Saipan) (PDF) (Report). Marine Corps Academy. Archived from the original (PDF) on 18 June 2022.

== Online resources ==
- Allen, William B. (2012). Sacked at Saipan (Monograph). School of Advanced Military Studies, United States Army Command an General Staff College – via Defense Technical Information Center.
- Anderson, Charles R. (2003). Western Pacific. U.S. Army Campaigns of World War II. United States Army Center of Military History. CMH Pub 72-29. Archived from the original on 3 February 2012.
- Bisno, Adam (2019). "Operation Forager: The Battle of Saipan, 15 June–9 July 1944". Naval History and Heritage Command. Archived from the original on 6 Dec 2019.
- Chen, C. Peter (2007). "The Marianas and the Great Turkey Shoot". World War II Database. Archived from the original on 12 Jul 2022.
- "Frank J. Davis World War II Photographs". SMU Libraries. Southern Methodist University. 2019. Contains 18 images depicting the surrender of the "hold-out" Japanese forces under the command of Captain Oba in December 1945.
- Moore, David (2002). "The Battle of Saipan— The Final Curtain". battleofsaipan.com. Archived from the original on 9 Dec 2002.
- Gilhooly, Rob (15 May 2011). "Japan's Renegade Hero Gives Saipan New Hope". Japan Times. Archived from the original on 6 Jul 2015.
- Gugeler, Russell A (1945). Army Amphibian Tractor and Tank Battalions in the Battle of Saipan (Report). Office of the Chief of Military History. 8–5.3 BA. Archived from the original on 3 Jan 2008.
- "Saipan". ibiblio.org. 2nd Marine Division. 1944. A 2nd Marine Division pamphlet published just before the invasion describing certain expected features of the invasion and combat, including the presence of a large civilian population.
- Torikai, Yukihiro (2006). "Battle of Attu Island, Saipan Island and Tinian Island". Torikai Lab Network (in Japanese). Archived from the original on 16 May 2007. Images and descriptions of Saipan, Tinian and Attu from a Japanese perspective.
