= Sam Rasoul =

American politician

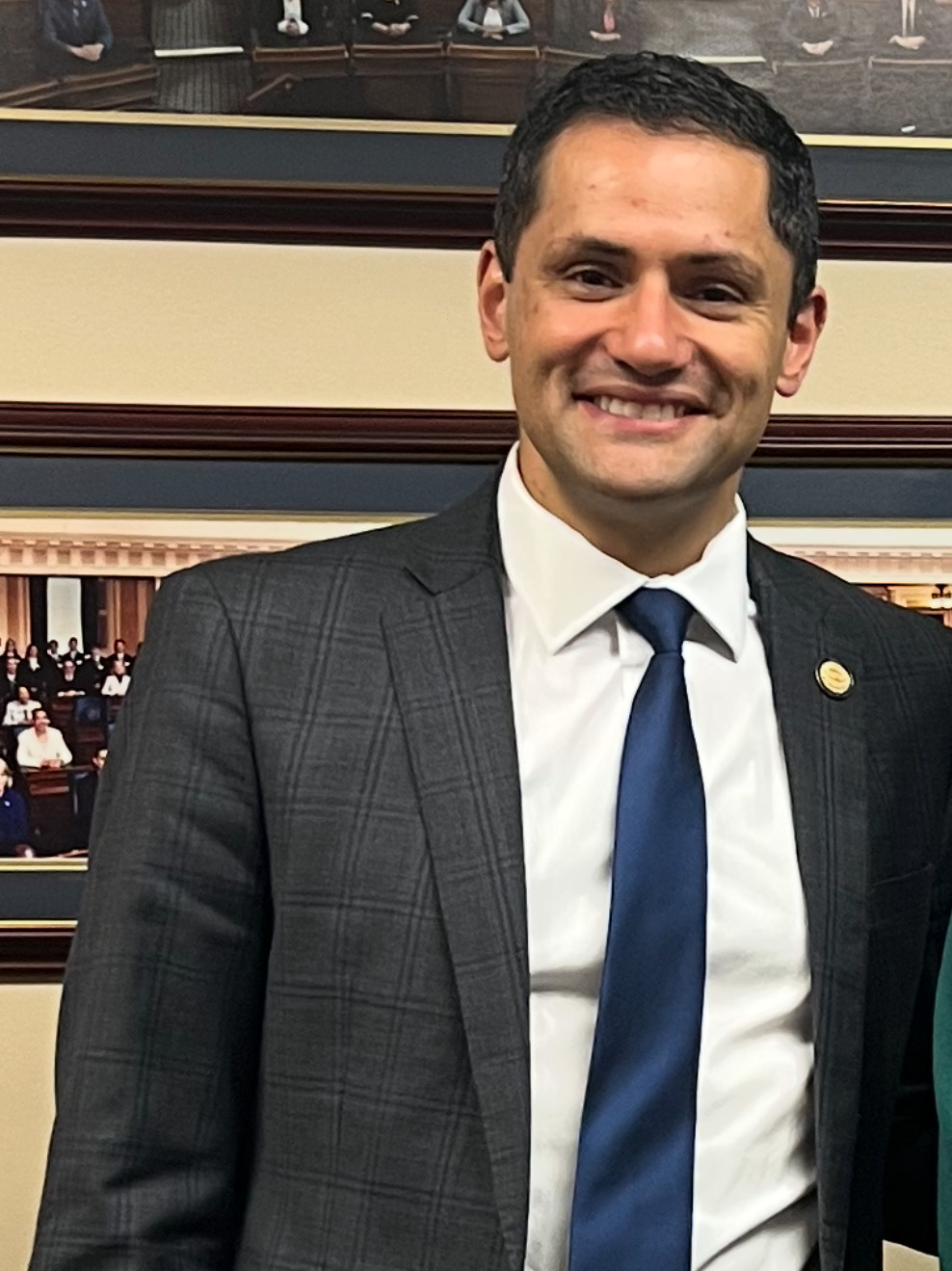
- Rasoul in 2023

Member of the Virginia House of Delegates
- Incumbent
- Assumed office January 8, 2014
- Preceded by: Onzlee Ware
- Constituency: 11th district (2014–2024); 38th district (2024–present)

Personal details
- Born: Salam Rasoul; June 30, 1981 (age 45) Warren, Ohio, U.S.
- Party: Democratic
- Spouse: Layaly Rasoul
- Children: 3
- Education: Roanoke College (BBA); Hawaii Pacific University (MBA); University of Dayton (JD)
- Website: Campaign website

Salam "Sam" Rasoul (born June 30, 1981) is an American politician and attorney serving as a member of the Virginia House of Delegates from the 38th district. He is one of the three Muslim members of the Virginia General Assembly. In November 2020, Rasoul announced his candidacy for Lieutenant Governor of Virginia in 2021. Despite a significant fundraising advantage, Rasoul placed 2nd in the Democratic primary losing to Hala Ayala by 64,352 votes.

== Early life and education ==
Rasoul was born in Warren, Ohio in 1981, the son of Palestinian immigrants. He earned a Bachelor of Business Administration from Roanoke College and a Master of Business Administration from Hawaii Pacific University. In 2026, Rasoul earned a Juris Doctor from the University of Dayton and subsequently passed the Virginia Bar.

== Career ==
Rasoul first ran for elected office in 2008 when he challenged incumbent Republican Bob Goodlatte for Virginia's 6th Congressional seat. He lost to Goodlatte by 25 percentage points in the heavily Republican district.

Rasoul was elected to the Virginia House of Delegates in a special election held on January 7, 2014. The special election was held to fill the vacancy created by the November 2013 resignation of Delegate Onzlee Ware. After winning the Democratic primary by 44 votes, Rasoul received nearly 70% of the vote over his Republican opponent Octavia Johnson in the general election. He was inducted into office on January 8, 2014.

Rasoul is a member of the Legislative Black Caucus and Rural Caucus in the House of Delegates.

He was a candidate in the 2021 Virginia lieutenant gubernatorial election. Rasoul lost to Hala Ayala. If nominated, he would have been the first Muslim candidate to run statewide anywhere in the South and the first Virginia statewide nominee from Roanoke since Ray Garland, who ran for U.S. Senate in 1971.

== Personal life ==
Rasoul and his wife, Layaly, have three children.

== Electoral history ==
Virginia's 6th congressional district election, 2008
Party	Candidate	Votes	%
Republican	Bob Goodlatte	192,350	61.6%
Democratic	Sam Rasoul	114,367	36.6%
Independent	Janice Lee Allen	5,413	1.7%
	Write-in	262	0.1%
Total votes		312,392	100.00%
Republican hold			

House of Delegates 11th District Special Election, 2014
Party	Candidate	Votes	%
Democratic	Sam Rasoul	5,129	70.2%
Republican	Octavia Lyvonne Johnson	2,166	29.6%
	Write-in	14	0.2%
Total votes		7,309	100.00%
Democratic hold			

House of Delegates 11th District Election, 2015
Party	Candidate	Votes	%
Democratic	Sam Rasoul (inc.)	11,216	96.2%
	Write-in	447	3.8%
Total votes		11,663	100.00%
Democratic hold			

House of Delegates 11th District Election, 2017
Party	Candidate	Votes	%
Democratic	Sam Rasoul (inc.)	15,667	96.93%
	write-ins	496	3.07%
Total votes		16,163	100%
Democratic hold			

House of Delegates 11th District Election, 2019
Party	Candidate	Votes	%
Democratic	Sam Rasoul (inc.)	10,269	94.38%
	write-ins	611	5.62%
Total votes		10,880	100%
Democratic hold			

House of Delegates 11th District Election, 2021
Party	Candidate	Votes	%
Democratic	Sam Rasoul (inc.)	14,532	64.5%
Republican	Charlie Nave	7,963	35.3%
	write-ins	37	0.2%
Total votes		22,532	100%
Democratic hold			
