= Senator Burton =

Senator Burton may refer to:

== Members of the United States Senate ==
- Harold Hitz Burton (1888–1964), U.S. Senator from Ohio from 1941 to 1945
- Joseph R. Burton (1852–1923), U.S. Senator from Kansas from 1901 to 1906
- Theodore E. Burton (1851–1929), U.S. Senator from Ohio from 1928 to 1929

== United States state senate members ==
- Colleen Burton (born 1958), Florida State Senate
- Dan Burton (born 1938), Indiana State Senate
- Frank P. Burton (1888–1956), Virginia State Senate
- Frank W. Burton (1857–1934), Illinois State Senate
- John Burton (American politician) (1932-2025), California State Senate
- Konni Burton (born 1963), Texas State Senate
- Terry C. Burton (born 1956), Mississippi State Senate
- Walter Moses Burton (1840–1913), Texas State Senate
