= George Rawlings =

American politician (1921–2009)

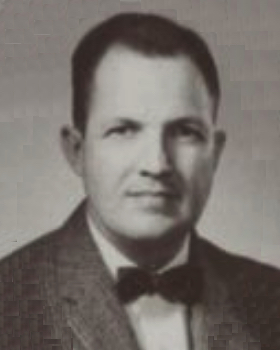

Member of the Virginia House of Delegates for Spotsylvania, Stafford, and Fredericksburg
- In office January 8, 1964 – January 14, 1970
- Preceded by: Francis B. Gouldman (as Delegate for Spotsylvania & Fredericksburg); Stanley A. Owens (as Delegate for Stafford)
- Succeeded by: Benjamin H. Woodbridge

Personal details
- Born: November 7, 1921 Fredericksburg, Virginia, U.S.
- Died: April 22, 2009 (aged 87) Fredericksburg, Virginia, U.S.
- Party: Democratic
- Spouse: Rosalie Saunders
- Education: Randolph-Macon College (B.A.); University of Virginia (LL.B.)

George Chancellor Rawlings Jr. (November 7, 1921 – April 22, 2009) was an American politician and attorney at law from Virginia. A member of the Democratic Party, he served as a member of the Virginia House of Delegates from 1963 to 1969.

== Early life ==
A native of Fredericksburg, Virginia, Rawlings grew up in Ashland. He graduated from Randolph-Macon College with a Bachelor of Arts degree, and received a Bachelor of Laws from the University of Virginia School of Law in 1947. That year, he moved back to Fredericksburg and opened his own law firm.

In 1951, Rawlings made an unsuccessful run for Commonwealth's Attorney of Spotsylvania County. In 1963, he ran for the Virginia House of Delegates and won, defeating multi-term incumbent Francis B. Gouldman (known for supporting racial segregation) in the Democratic primary by a 2 to 1 margin, then polling 57.6% of the votes to defeat Republican candidate Ryland H. Heflin. Rawlings was re-elected twice and served until 1969. While a Delegate, he quickly gained a reputation as one of the leading liberals in a legislature still dominated by conservative Democrats. He was a major supporter of civil and political rights for African-Americans and the rights of organized labor.

== Congressional campaigns ==
In 1966, Rawlings first ran for federal office, challenging Congressman Howard W. Smith, a powerful eighteen-term incumbent and Byrd Organization stalwart who had been in office since the Hoover administration, in the Democratic primary. As chairman of the House Rules Committee as well as a segregationist, Smith had used his position for years to block civil rights legislation. Rawlings, drawing on the support of black voters who had only recently been enfranchised by the Civil Rights Act of 1964, defeated Smith by a vote of 27,115 to 26,470, a margin of just 645 votes.

The Fredericksburg Free Lance-Star declared his victory "the upset of the century." In the general election, however, Rawlings lost to Republican nominee William L. Scott, who received the support of most of Smith's primary voters, by a vote of 50,782 to 37,929, a nearly 15% margin.

In 1970, Rawlings, now retired from the House of Delegates, sought the Democratic nomination for the United States Senate, challenging Senator Harry F. Byrd Jr., the son of the Byrd Organization's late founder and boss. After the Democratic defeats in the 1969 general election, the younger Byrd changed his party affiliation from Democratic to independent and refused to sign a loyalty oath that pledged him to support all Democratic nominees for office. In that Democratic primary, Rawlings narrowly placed first with 58,874 votes (45.65%) over fellow liberal State Senator Clive L. DuVal II, who collected 58,174 votes (45.11%). Although DuVal was entitled to ask for a runoff, he declined to do so, and Rawlings became the Democratic nominee. In the general election, however, Rawlings secured only 294,582 votes (31%), compared to 506,237 votes (54%) for Senator Byrd. Republican Ray L. Garland placed third with 144,765 votes (15%).

== Later life ==
Rawlings then returned to his law practice, but did not leave politics entirely. In 1972, he joined his friend and ally Henry Howell, a former Democratic State Senator who had been elected as Lieutenant Governor as an independent in a 1971 special election, as well as supporters of Democratic presidential candidate George McGovern, to attempt to purge the official machinery of the Democratic Party of the last vestiges of the Byrd Organization. As a result of these activities, Rawlings was elected as a member of the Democratic National Committee (a post he held until 1980) and as chairman of the Eighth District Democratic Committee (which he remained until 1993). The next year, Howell ran for Governor of Virginia as an independent without a Democratic opponent and with the support of the party organization.

In 1975, Rawlings and his wife, Rosalie, divorced after Rawlings came out to her as gay. After moving to Fairfax County with his new partner, he continued to practice law.

In 2000, he was caught embezzling from a client's account. He pleaded guilty and received a suspended sentence of five years. He died on April 22, 2009, at Mary Washington Hospital in Fredericksburg.

Party political offices
Preceded by Harry F. Byrd Jr.	Democratic nominee for U.S. Senator from Virginia (Class 1); 1970	Succeeded by Elmo Zumwalt
