= Senator Muse =

Senator Muse may refer to:

- Benjamin Muse (1898–1986), Virginia State Senate
- C. Anthony Muse (born 1958), Maryland State Senate
- Leonard G. Muse (1897–1994), Virginia State Senate
