= John C. Towler =

American politician

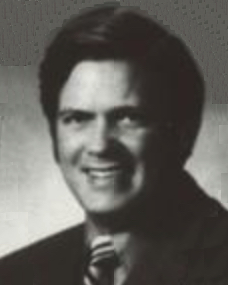
- Official portrait, 1972

Member of the Virginia House of Delegates from the 7th district
- In office January 12, 1972 – January 9, 1974 Serving with Ray L. Garland
- Preceded by: Willis M. Anderson
- Succeeded by: Vic Thomas

Personal details
- Born: John Cotten Towler; July 5, 1939 Charlottesville, Virginia, U.S.
- Died: December 16, 2015 (aged 76) Barco, North Carolina, U.S.
- Party: Democratic
- Spouses: Elizabeth Davis (m. 1965; died 1973); Melissa Beam (m. 1974)
- Education: Washington and Lee University (BA); Georgetown University (JD)

Military service
- Branch/service: United States Army

John Cotten Towler Sr. (July 5, 1939 – December 16, 2015) was an American Democratic politician, lawyer, screenwriter and actor.

== Early and family life ==
Born in Charlottesville, Virginia, to the former Jane Cotten Nolan and her career United States Army officer husband, William Albert Towler Jr., the family moved several times during his childhood. Towler became a star athlete and disc jockey before he graduated from high school in South Boston, Virginia. He then studied and joined the R.O.T.C. at Washington and Lee University. After graduation, he was commissioned as a second lieutenant and served in the Korean War. Using his GI Bill benefits, Towler received his Juris Doctor degree from Georgetown University Law Center, after also clerking for Virginia Senator William Spong. Towler married his first wife, Elizabeth Davis, in 1965, and they had three sons (John Jr., Grayson and Everett) before her death in an automobile accident. Towler remarried, to Melissa Beam, in 1974, who would survive him.

== Career ==
After admission to the Virginia bar, Towler practiced law in Roanoke, Virginia and began his lifelong involvement with the Democratic Party. In 1971, Towler won election to the Virginia House of Delegates, representing the multi-member 7th district alongside Republican Ray Garland, but only served one term, since fellow Democrat Vic Thomas was the top vote-getter in 1973, and thus served alongside Garland and several other politicians in what became a long legislative career.

In 1979, Towler and his wife moved to Beverly Hills, California where Towler wrote scripts for several television shows, and also acted in some. In 1989, Towler and his wife moved back east to Kitty Hawk, North Carolina.

== Death and legacy ==
Towler died in Barco, North Carolina after suffering a fall.
