= Chip Woodrum =

American politician

Member of the Virginia House of Delegates
- In office January 9, 1980 – January 14, 2004 Serving with Vic Thomas until 1983
- Preceded by: Ray L. Garland
- Succeeded by: Onzlee Ware
- Constituency: 7th district (1980–1982); 6th district (1982–1983); 16th district (1983–2002); 11th district (2002–2004)

Personal details
- Born: Clifton Alexander Woodrum III; July 23, 1938 Washington, D.C., U.S.
- Died: February 19, 2013 (aged 74) Naples, Florida, U.S.
- Party: Democratic
- Spouse: Emily Abbitt (m. 1963)
- Relatives: Clifton A. Woodrum (grandfather)
- Education: University of North Carolina at Chapel Hill (AB); University of Virginia (LLB
- Occupation: Lawyer; politician

Clifton Alexander "Chip" Woodrum III (July 23, 1938 – February 19, 2013) was a Virginia lawyer and politician.

== Early and family life ==
Born in Washington, D.C. to Clifton A. Woodrum Jr. and his wife the former Margaret Troy Lanier, Woodrum lost his lawyer father on Christmas, 1959, but nonetheless graduated from University of North Carolina at Chapel Hill in 1961. Continuing the family tradition, he received his law degree from University of Virginia Law School in 1964. His great-grandfather was Roanoke's first elected Commonwealth's attorney. His grandfather Clifton A. Woodrum served in the United States House of Representatives. Chip Woodrum married Emily Clyde Abbitt (daughter of Meredith Webb Abbitt and Catherine Clyde Moore) on August 10, 1963, in Newport News, Virginia.

== Career ==
As had three previous generations of his family, Woodrum practiced law in Roanoke, Virginia. He was also active in various bar associations, the Roanoke Chamber of Commerce and the United Way. Woodrum also served on the board of directors of the Legal Aid Society of Roanoke from 1967 until 1976 and had also served as the organization's vice-president.

His political career began in the Roanoke City Young Democrat Club in 1960, as the city bucked Massive Resistance advocated by the Byrd Organization. First elected to the Virginia House of Delegates in 1979, Woodrum served (part-time) from 1980 until 2003. He served on the State Crime Commission beginning in 1982 and became its chair. He also served on the State Water Commission beginning in 1981. In the General Assembly, Delegate Woodrum served on the Courts of Justice committee and the Appropriations and Corporations, Banking and Insurance committees, among others. He modernized Virginia's Freedom of Information Act in the 1990s, and also helped construct programs to rehabilitate offenders, as well as to enable low income Virginians to attend college.

Woodrum initially served alongside fellow Democrat Vic Thomas. In 1979 they defeated Republicans Elizabeth T. Bowles and Mary Brooks, and in 1981 they defeated Independent Zaman K. McManaway. His district, which comprised parts of the City of Roanoke as well as the County of Roanoke, was initially numbered the 7th Virginia district, but briefly became the 6th district in 1982 (comprising only the City of Roanoke). Further redistricting required by a judicial decision mandating single member districts again combined parts of the city and county, and renumbered it as the 16th district from 1983 until 2001. He often faced no opponent when re-elected, but soundly defeated Republican Newell R. Falkinburg in 1995 and Independent A.R. Sadjadi in 1999.

After the Republican party took control of the House of Delegates in 2000, he lost his seat on the Appropriations committee and was redistricted into the same district as his ally, former majority leader Richard Cranwell (who retired, so Woodrum faced no challenger in the primary nor general election). During his last term, until Woodrum declined to seek re-election, the district was numbered the 11th. After winning a primary contest against B.M. Shepard, lawyer Onzlee Ware succeeded him as that Roanoke district's delegate.

Woodrum then was appointed to the board of trustees of the Library of Virginia, where he served beginning in 2004 and as chair in 2011 and 2012.

== Death and legacy ==
Woodrum died in Florida, where he normally spent winters.
