= Vesta, Virginia =

Unincorporated community in Virginia, United States

- Unincorporated community
- Location within Virginia Location within the United States
- Coordinates: 36°43′00″N 80°21′28″W
- Country: United States
- State: Virginia
- County: Patrick
- Elevation: 2,841 ft (866 m)
- Time zone: UTC−5 (Eastern (EST))
  - Summer (DST): UTC−4 (EDT)
- ZIP code: 24177
- Area code: 276
- GNIS feature ID: 1476176

Vesta is an unincorporated community in Patrick County, Virginia, United States. Vesta is located on U.S. Route 58, 7.5 miles (12.1 km) northwest of Stuart. Vesta has a post office with ZIP code 24177.

== Notable person ==
- Frank P. Burton (1888–1956), member of the Virginia Senate
