= Francis B. Gouldman =

American politician

Member of the Virginia House of Delegates for Spotsylvania, Stafford, and Fredericksburg
- In office January, 1952 – January 7, 1964
- Preceded by: William J. Gibson
- Succeeded by: George C. Rawlings

Personal details
- Born: June 17, 1907 Fredericksburg, Virginia, U.S.
- Died: May 1, 1991 (aged 83) Richmond, Virginia, U.S.
- Party: Democratic
- Spouse(s): Margaret Moss; Frances Schleigh
- Children: Barbara Wilhour
- Education: University of Richmond (BA); University of Virginia (LLB)

Francis B. Gouldman (June 17, 1907 – May 1, 1991) was an American politician, lawyer and judge from the U.S. state of Virginia. A member of the Democratic Party, and the Byrd Organization, he served as a member of the Virginia House of Delegates from 1952 to 1964, representing his native Fredericksburg, Virginia, and Spotsylvania County. A year after he was defeated in the 1963 Democratic primary to retain his part-time office as delegate, Gouldman was elected a judge of the first Juvenile and Domestic Relations court in Virginia, and served until 1977.

== Early and family life ==
A native of Fredericksburg, Virginia, Gouldman was the son of John F. Gouldman Jr. (who served on the city council for 35 years) and his wife, the former Mabel Birdsall. He graduated from Fredericksburg High School in 1924, then the Richmond College with a Bachelor of Arts degree in 1928. He received a Bachelor of Laws from the University of Virginia School of Law in 1931.

He married Margaret Elizabeth Moss, and they had a daughter Barbara Anne. After her death in 1960, he married Frances Schleigh, and helped raise her son and daughter. He was active in the Zoan Baptist Church, as well as with the Masons and Elks.

== Political career ==
A colorful trial lawyer and active in the local Democratic party, Gouldman served on the Fredericksburg City Council beginning in 1942, and was elected its president as top vote-getter in 1950. In 1947, he ran for the Virginia House of Delegates in the primary against incumbent William J. Gibson, but lost. When Gibson announced his retirement from the legislature in 1951, Gouldman won both the primary and general election. He was re-elected several times, but was defeated in 1963 by George C. Rawlings (a Kennedy liberal) in the Democratic primary by a 2 to 1 margin, Rawlings then defeated the Republican candidate in the general election to succeed Gouldman in the Virginia General Assembly.

As a legislator, Gouldman supported stronger traffic laws, a uniform teacher salary scale and opposed sales of liquor by the drink, but became best known for supporting racial segregation during the Massive Resistance crisis in Virginia. He proposed a law to declare Brown v. Board of Education "null and void" in the Commonwealth, and in 1958 was appointed to a committee chaired by delegate John B. Boatwright which sought to bring legal ethics charges against the NAACP. Although some ascribed Gouldman's defeat in the Democratic primary in 1963 to support for a costly dam in far-away Salem, the U.S. Supreme Court a few months previously had decided in favor of the NAACP in NAACP v. Button, thus striking down the statutes on which that committee had proceeded.

== Family Court judge ==
The next term, fellow legislators elected Gouldman as a judge of the domestic relations court. He advocated building separate juvenile detention facilities, and kept his family courtroom formal, as well as insisted on prompt payment of child support. He resigned in 1977 (at age 70), although an investigation of his conduct was underway. His former law partner William B. Hix succeeded him on the bench.

Gouldman died on May 1, 1991, in a Richmond hospital.
