= William Meade Fletcher =

American lawyer and politician

Member of the Virginia State Corporation Commission
- In office February 1, 1928 – December 19, 1943
- Preceded by: Berkley D. Adams
- Succeeded by: Harvey B. Apperson

Personal details
- Born: William Meade Fletcher; October 21, 1870 Sperryville, Rappahannock County, Virginia, US
- Died: December 19, 1943 (aged 73) Richmond, Virginia
- Resting place: St. Paul's Episcopal Churchyard, Woodville, Rappahannock County, Virginia
- Party: Democratic
- Spouse(s): Florence Lea (d. 1911); Martha Ball Buckner (m.1914)
- Education: University of Virginia School of Law
- Profession: lawyer, professor, author, judge
- Known for: Fletcher's Cyclopedia of the Law of Corporations

William Meade Fletcher (October 21, 1870 – December 19, 1943) was an American lawyer, professor and Virginia judge, perhaps best known as the author of Fletcher's Cyclopedia of the Law of Corporations which continues to be revised decades after his death. Affiliated with the Byrd Organization, Fletcher served as member of the Virginia Corporation Commission (1928–1943).

== Early life and education ==
Born in 1855 near Sperryville, Rappahannock County, Virginia to the former Catherine Meade and her farmer husband James William Fletcher (1827–1900), he was descended from the First Families of Virginia. He had a younger brother, James Hamilton Fletcher (1872–1948). In the 1850 census, his father owned 14 slaves, and 39 slaves a decade later. After the conflict, William M. Fletcher received an elementary education locally, then traveled to Charlottesville where he studied under Professor John B. Minor and received a law degree from the University of Virginia School of Law in 1891.

== Career ==
Admitted to the bar in 1891, Fletcher first practiced law in Montana (1891–1894) before moving to Chicago, Illinois where he practiced mostly corporate law for nearly two decades beginning in 1895. Fletcher also became a professor of law at what was then the John Marshall Law School (1899–1901) and then at Northwestern University (1901–1904). Between 1905 and 1912, Fletcher taught at law schools in Philadelphia and Chicago, before returning to Rappahannock County and remarrying.

Fletcher wrote several major legal treatises, as seen below, some multi-volume. His first legal publication was about corporate franchises (published by Keefe Davidson Company in 1900), then two years later Fletcher published one on equity pleading and practice, and in 1910 another concerning the incorporation and management of corporations. Although he published another book on equity in 1912, Fletcher's great work was the initially nine volume 'Cyclopedia of the Law of Private Corporations', beginning in 1917. Renamed 'Fletcher's Cyclopedia of the Law of Corporations', it remains in print today through Thomson Reuters which acquired West Legal Publishing. Fletcher's co-author or editor was Basil Jones (1874–1939), a fellow University of Virginia graduate and lawyer who became an editor with Callaghan and Company in Chicago and would be buried there at Rosehill Cemetery. Jones's father, C.S.A. Major Horace Jones (1835–1905), had served as Charlottesville's mayor and his widow (Basil's mother) Susan Johnson Duke (1835–1922), regaled her grandchildren in Chicago about prewar Oak Hill plantation in Virginia and chose to be buried there.

Fletcher and fellow Rappahannock County native Wade Hampton Massey Sr. (1869–1944) of historic Meadow Grove Farm were close friends as well as political allies of Virginia Governor then U.S. Senator Harry F. Byrd Sr. (1887–1966), who also traced his lineage to the First Families of Virginia

In 1893 Fletcher served as special judge of the Cascade County District Court in Montana. Three decades later, in 1925, Virginia legislators elected him as Judge of the Court of Juvenile and Domestic Relations for Rappahannock County, but he only served for a year. In 1926, Governor Byrd appointed Fletcher to a Commission to Suggest Amendments to the Constitution of Virginia. The following year, Virginia legislators appointed Fletcher as a member of the Virginia Corporation Commission. He took that judicial and regulatory office on February 1, 1928, and served until his death, with several terms as the rotating chairman. Fletcher also served as a Virginia delegate to the Delaware Democratic National Convention in 1932.

By 1914 Fletcher lived at a nearby historic house named 'Erin' while rehabilitating 'Thornton Hill', the family farm in Rappahannock County. Its earliest part had been constructed in 1790 for John Thornton, whose wife was a niece of George Washington (Francis Thornton had patented the acreage in 1720). In 1936 Fletcher cooperated with a historic inventory by the Works Project Administration.

== Published works ==
- Taxation of Franchises (1900)
- Treatise on Equity, Pleading and Practice (1902)
- Corporation Forms and Precedents (1913), 2nd Ed. 1928
- Treatise on Incorporation and Management of Corporations in Illinois (1910)
- Cyclopedia of the Law of Private Corporations (1917–1920)
- Supplement to Corporation Forms and Precedents (1923)
- Cyclopedia of the Law of Private Corptoations (1917–1920)

== Personal life ==
Fletcher married twice. In 1896 he married Florence Lea of Philadelphia (1868–1911), who bore William Meade Fletcher II (1897–1978) who became a lawyer. After her death, Fletcher moved back to Virginia. In 1914 he remarried, to the former Martha Ball Buckner (1888–1996), who could trace her descent from Charles Washington, Lawrence Washington's brother and whose daughter had lived at Thornton Hill shortly after its construction. They had a daughter, Anne Buckner Fletcher Smith (1915–1942), and a son, James William Fletcher (1918–1998).

== Death and legacy ==
Fletcher moved to Richmond after his judicial appointment, but often spent weekends at his Rappahannock estates. He suffered from diabetes in his later years, and died of a heart attack in Richmond on December 19, 1943, survived by his widow, daughter and two sons. As had been his father, he is buried in Rappahannock county at the former cemetery for St. Paul's Episcopal Church in Woodville, Virginia. Although the church itself was destroyed in 1929 and not rebuilt, the graveyard continues to be used by Trinity Episcopal Church in nearby Washington, Virginia. In 1952 his son would erect a kennel for a local foxhunting group.
