= Lewis P. Fickett Jr. =

American diplomat, educator, and politician (1926–2016)

Member of the Virginia House of Delegates from the 24th district
- In office January 9, 1974 – January 13, 1982
- Preceded by: Benjamin H. Woodbridge
- Succeeded by: Mitchell Van Yahres

Personal details
- Born: Lewis Perley Fickett Jr. May 28, 1926 Winthrop, Massachusetts, U.S.
- Died: May 17, 2016 (aged 89) Fredericksburg, Virginia, U.S.
- Party: Democratic
- Education: Bowdoin College; Harvard University
- Occupation: Diplomat; educator; politician

Lewis Perley Fickett Jr. (May 28, 1926 – May 17, 2016) was an American diplomat, educator, and politician.

== Early life and education ==
Born in Winthrop, Massachusetts, Fickett graduated from Portland High School in Portland, Maine. He served in the United States Navy during World War II. Fickett graduated from Bowdoin College in 1947. He then received his law degree in 1952 from Harvard Law School. In 1956, Fickett received his doctorate from Harvard University.

== Career ==
Fickett served in the United States Foreign Service and was stationed in Algeria, West Germany, and Washington, D.C. From 1963 until 2001, Fickett taught political science at the University of Mary Washington.

From 1974 to 1982, Fickett served in the Virginia House of Delegates and was a Democrat.

== Personal life and death ==
He lived in Fredericksburg, Virginia.

Fickett died on May 17, 2016 in a hospital in Fredericksburg after a brief illness.
