= 1970 United States Senate election in Virginia =

- November 3, 1970
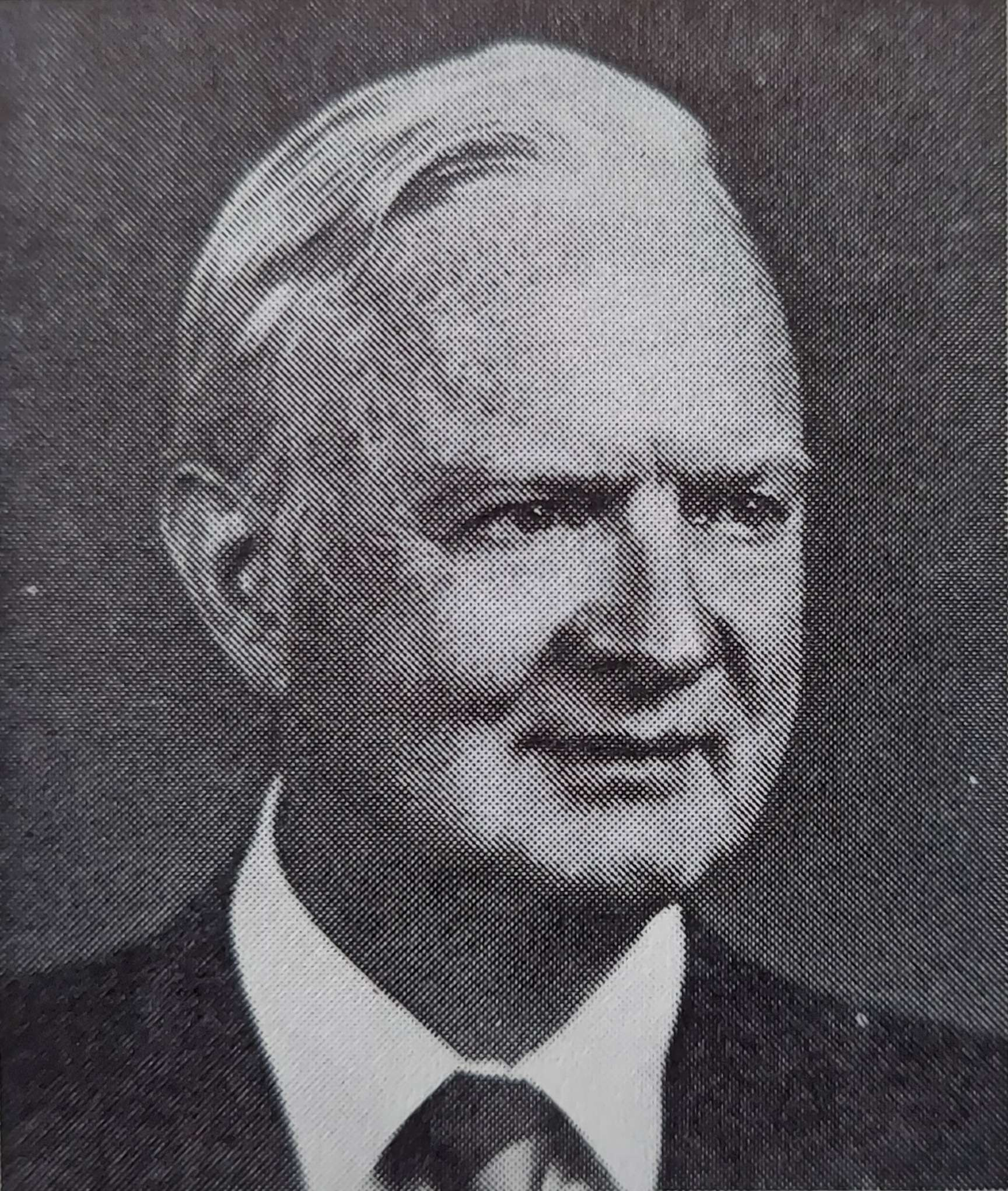

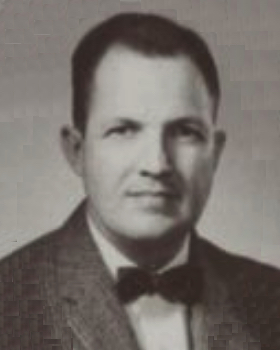

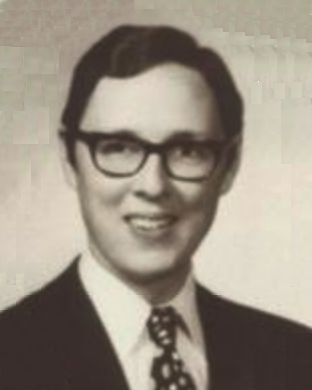
Nominee	Harry F. Byrd Jr.	George Rawlings	Ray L. Garland
Party	Independent	Democratic	Republican
Popular vote	506,237	294,582	144,765
Percentage	53.54%	31.15%	15.31%
- County and independent city results Byrd: 30–40% 40–50% 50–60% 60–70% 70–80% 80–90% Rawlings: 30–40% 40–50% 50–60% 70–80% Garland: 30–40% 40–50% 50–60%
U.S. senator before election
Harry F. Byrd Jr.
Democratic
Elected U.S. Senator
Harry F. Byrd Jr.
Independent

The 1970 United States Senate election in Virginia was held on November 3, 1970. Incumbent senator Harry F. Byrd Jr. was re-elected to a second term (and first full term) in office over state delegates George Rawlings and Ray L. Garland. Byrd left the Democratic Party shortly before the election and became the first non-Democrat to represent Virginia in the Senate since 1889.

Byrd won large margins throughout the commonwealth, except for the historic "anti-organization" coal union strongholds in the southwest and a few heavily African American counties in the Tidewater region.

== Background ==
In 1966, Harry F. Byrd Jr. was elected to complete the unexpired term of his father, Harry F. Byrd.

Since the 1890s, Byrd Jr. and his father had led a rural, conservative Democratic Party political machine (known as the Byrd machine) which had come to dominate Virginia politics. However, the machine's grip had weakened dramatically over the prior decade, beginning with the failure of its policy of "massive resistance" to school desegregation in the 1950s. After the failure of massive resistance, the party was divided into factions of conservative loyalists, moderates, and liberals led by Henry Howell. A fourth faction of more extreme conservatives were angered by the party's subsequent support for Lyndon B. Johnson in the 1964 presidential election and formed the Conservative Party, advising members to abstain from participation in Democratic primary elections. As a result of these fissures, long-time Byrd machine incumbents A. Willis Robertson and Howard W. Smith both lost in the 1966 Democratic primary, and Byrd Jr. narrowly survived a primary challenge from moderate Armistead L. Boothe, signalling the end of the machine's domination.

The decline of the Byrd machine and divisions within the Democratic Party created ample opportunities for the Republican Party of Virginia. Entering 1970, Republicans had carried the state at the presidential level in four of the five preceding elections, and in 1969, Virginia had elected Linwood Holton to serve as the first Republican governor since the Reconstruction era. However, the Republicans were also divided into two rival factions: the historical, progressive base of the party, based in mountainous western Virginia, from which Holton had led opposition to the Byrd machine, and a growing conservative eastern faction, based in the suburbs of Washington, D.C. and Richmond. Many conservative Republicans admired Byrd and preferred to build the party up by winning flipping conservative seats which liberals had won in the Democratic primaries. Holton won the 1969 election with an unusual combination of support from three traditionally Democratic groups in Virginia: conservative financial and business interests, organized labor, and African Americans.

In 1969, President Richard Nixon and his southern aide Harry S. Dent Sr. actively recruited Senator Byrd to switch parties, using the codeword "Okinawa" as part of his larger "southern strategy" in the 1970 midterm elections. In October, Byrd commissioned a poll which showed him holding narrow leads in the Democratic primary and general election, indicating a significant risk to running for the nomination of his increasingly liberal and racially diverse party. After Holton's victory in the fall elections, the governor-elect met with Nixon aide Bryce Harlow. Although Holton preferred to support his law partner, state delegate M. Caldwell Butler, in the upcoming Senate election, Holton also admitted that he had attempted to recruit Byrd Jr. to switch parties on "at least three occasions," but had not received a response. A more detailed poll commissioned by Byrd in January 1970 showed him trailing Henry Howell by four points among Democratic voters. On March 17, 1970, Byrd announced that he would run as an "Independent Democrat."

== Democratic primary ==
=== Candidates ===
- Clive L. DuVal II, state delegate from McLean
- George C. Rawlings Jr. former state delegate from Fredericksburg and candidate for U.S. House in 1966

==== Declined ====
- Harry F. Byrd Jr., incumbent U.S. senator since 1966 (ran as independent)
- Henry Howell, state senator from Norfolk
- J. Sargeant Reynolds, lieutenant governor of Virginia

=== Campaign ===
Two of the leading contenders to challenge Byrd, Henry Howell and J. Sargeant Reynolds, declined early in the race. Reynolds, the popular lieutenant governor, As a result, Larry Sabato has described the July primary as "the most apathetic state election in Virginia's recent history." Rawlings, who had defeated Howard W. Smith in the 1966 primary but lost to William L. Scott in the general election, ran as a proponent of the New Frontier and Great Society programs.

=== Results ===
Fewer than 130,000 voters turned out, and Rawlins defeated DuVal by only 700 votes. The low turnout was taken as a sign that many Democratic voters still supported Byrd.

== Republican primary ==
=== Candidates ===
- Ray L. Garland, state delegate from Roanoke

==== Declined ====
- Harry F. Byrd Jr., incumbent U.S. senator since 1966 (ran as independent)

=== Campaign ===
Following Byrd's decision to run as an independent, Holton and other Republican leaders declined to support his candidacy, seeking instead to nominate a Republican as an opponent.

On April 1, Holton posited that Byrd could not be reelected as an independent and would not get the support of the Republicans unless he formally joined the party and sought its nomination. Holton also pressed Byrd to embrace Nixon's position that Brown v. Board of Education "was right in both constitutional and human terms." Holton also met with Republican congressional leadership in April to emphasize his position in favor of nominating a Republican senatorial candidate in 1970 and received their support.

On April 23, Holton met with Nixon to discuss the matter. Holton, Nixon, and Dent later disagreed over the course of the meeting, with Nixon and Dent assuming that Holton had agreed not to nominate a candidate, and Holton believing that Nixon had agreed to invite Byrd to join the Republican Party. On the same day, a group of conservative financiers who had supported Holton in the 1969 election pressured Byrd to join the Republican Party; he refused to switch parties, but he agreed to drop the word "Democrat" from his party identification, running as just an "Independent." When the Nixon administration made the same request for a party switch, Byrd refused again, telling Bryce Harlow, "I'm going to run as an independent, and I'm going to be elected as an independent." Byrd formally filed to run as an independent on June 15, ending speculation that he would switch parties.

=== Convention results ===
With their state convention in late June rapidly approaching, Republicans considered whether to endorse Byrd, remain neutral, or nominate a candidate of their own. Joel Broyhill and Republican Senatorial Campaign Committee chair Lee R. Nunn briefly led efforts for a Byrd endorsement, but they instead settled on a strategy favoring neutrality. On the eve of the convention, Holton delivered a rousing speech in favor of nominating a candidate against Byrd. "Frankly, I can't believe it," Holton told the delegates. "We're the biggest, strongest, and the best party in Virginia. ... I can't believe we'll do nothing. Doing nothing would be like having the biggest, shiniest, newest fire engine and not taking it to a fire." Broyhill and other Byrd supporters conceded that the speech was effective, and throughout the next day, Holton met with delegates to urge a nomination.

At the start of proceedings, Broyhill made a political gaffe when he claimed Byrd would, in exchange for an endorsement or neutrality, vote with the Republicans to organize the next Senate. His comment prompted a public disavowal from Byrd, who issued a statement maintaining that he had made "no commitments to anyone." When Broyhill ultimately moved for no nomination for United States Senate, the resolution was defeated by over 200 votes. The convention nominated Ray L. Garland, a little-known legislator whom Holton had recruited from his own home city of Roanoke.

== General election ==
=== Candidates ===
- Harry F. Byrd Jr., incumbent U.S. senator since 1966 (Independent)
- Ray L. Garland, state delegate from Roanoke (Republican)
- George C. Rawlings Jr. former state delegate from Fredericksburg (Democratic)

=== Campaign ===
While Byrd preferred a two-way race, early polling indicated that the presence of candidates from both major parties split the anti-Byrd vote rather than the pro-Byrd vote. The Holton coalition quickly disintegrated. Byrd recovered the conservative financial and business interests which had backed Holton in 1969, while the liberal Crusade for Voters and AFL-CIO endorsed the Democratic candidate Rawlings. Garland faded rapidly into third place.

Court-ordered desegregation busing was an issue in the campaign, following a July ruling by Robert R. Merhige Jr. which called for the busing of 13,000 students in the city of Richmond. Holton not only complied with the order but accompanied his thirteen-year-old daughter to predominantly black John F. Kennedy High School while his wife took their other children to a middle school in which they were the only white students. The act outraged conservatives, whose anger was transferred to Garland. Garland stressed his opposition to busing, an issue where Byrd was already the leading candidate for conservatives, further limiting Garland's potential support.

Although Nixon did not formally endorse Byrd, he embraced a position of "benevolent neutrality," inviting Byrd to a meeting to discuss the administration's Family Assistance Plan and a state dinner for the president of Mexico. When vice president Spiro Agnew endorsed Garland on October 26, the White House quickly pressured Agnew to call Byrd and apologize. Agnew promised not to mention the Virginia campaign again. Holton and other Republicans were publicly critical of Nixon, arguing that the national party was "seriously hurting our efforts to build a strong Republican Party in Virginia," noting that the strategy would discourage conservatives from joining the Republican Party by offering the option of switching their support from candidate to candidate in various campaigns.

=== Results ===
Byrd won an easy victory; the turnout for this election was the largest in Virginia senatorial election history at the time.

1970 United States Senate election in Virginia
Party	Candidate	Votes	%	±%
Independent	Harry F. Byrd Jr. (incumbent)	506,237	53.54%	N/A
Democratic	George C. Rawlings, Jr.	294,582	31.15%	▼22.15
Republican	Ray L. Garland	144,765	15.31%	▼22.07
Write-in		30	0.00%	▼0.02
Majority		211,655	22.38%	+6.46%
Turnout		945,614		
Independent gain from Democratic				

==== Results by county or independent city ====
1970 United States Senate election in Virginia by county or independent city
	George C. Rawlings Jr. Democratic		Ray Lucian Garland Republican		Harry Flood Byrd Jr. Independent		Various candidates Write-ins		Margin (Note: Because Byrd won the election as an Independent and Rawlings ran second behind him, all county and city results are Rawlings vote minus Byrd vote unless states otherwise for the county or city in question)		Total votes cast
	#	%	#	%	#	%	#	%	#	%	Total votes cast
Accomack County	1,361	23.00%	748	12.64%	3,808	64.36%			-2,447	-41.36%	5,917
Albemarle County	1,184	18.60%	985	15.47%	4,198	65.93%			-3,014	-47.34%	6,367
Alleghany County	563	23.90%	515	21.86%	1,278	54.24%			-715	-30.35%	2,356
Amelia County	622	28.53%	123	5.64%	1,434	65.78%	1	0.05%	-812	-37.25%	2,180
Amherst County	931	21.72%	363	8.47%	2,993	69.82%			-2,062	-48.10%	4,287
Appomattox County	536	14.53%	191	5.18%	2,962	80.29%			-2,426	-65.76%	3,689
Arlington County	14,270	33.05%	7,607	17.62%	21,302	49.33%			-7,032	-16.29%	43,179
Augusta County	1,090	16.27%	1,668	24.90%	3,942	58.84%			-2,274 (Note: In this county or city where Rawlings ran third behind both Byrd and Garland, margin given is Garland vote minus Byrd vote and percentage margin Garland percentage minus Byrd percentage.)	-33.94%	6,700
Bath County	186	18.25%	220	21.59%	613	60.16%			-393	-38.57%	1,019
Bedford County	761	16.83%	464	10.26%	3,296	72.90%			-2,535	-56.07%	4,521
Bland County	408	27.04%	351	23.26%	750	49.70%			-342	-22.66%	1,509
Botetourt County	733	20.46%	930	25.96%	1,917	53.52%	2	0.06%	-987	-27.56%	3,582
Brunswick County	1,291	35.78%	93	2.58%	2,224	61.64%			-933	-25.86%	3,608
Buchanan County	3,141	51.56%	1,753	28.78%	1,198	19.67%			1,388 (Note: In this county or city where Byrd ran third behind Garland and Rawlings, margin given is Rawlings vote minus Garland vote and percentage margin Rawlings percentage minus Garland percentage.)	22.78%	6,092
Buckingham County	863	27.57%	182	5.81%	2,085	66.61%			-1,222	-39.04%	3,130
Campbell County	811	11.68%	782	11.26%	5,351	77.06%			-4,540	-65.38%	6,944
Caroline County	1,505	46.29%	153	4.71%	1,593	49.00%			-88	-2.71%	3,251
Carroll County	1,530	31.16%	2,473	50.37%	907	18.47%			-943	-19.21%	4,910
Charles City County	1,074	72.76%	69	4.67%	333	22.56%			741	50.20%	1,476
Charlotte County	656	20.74%	189	5.98%	2,318	73.28%			-1,662	-52.55%	3,163
Chesterfield County	2,565	16.62%	1,592	10.31%	11,280	73.07%			-8,715	-56.46%	15,437
Clarke County	307	15.07%	123	6.04%	1,607	78.89%			-1,300	-63.82%	2,037
Craig County	240	24.95%	268	27.86%	453	47.09%	1	0.10%	-185	-19.23%	962
Culpeper County	795	23.82%	468	14.02%	2,075	62.16%			-1,280	-38.35%	3,338
Cumberland County	810	39.78%	69	3.39%	1,157	56.83%			-347	-17.04%	2,036
Dickenson County	2,654	42.48%	3,078	49.27%	515	8.24%			-424	-6.79%	6,247
Dinwiddie County	1,209	29.14%	193	4.65%	2,747	66.21%			-1,538	-37.07%	4,149
Essex County	560	33.61%	74	4.44%	1,032	61.94%			-472	-28.33%	1,666
Fairfax County	29,259	33.16%	19,707	22.33%	39,278	44.51%			-10,019	-11.35%	88,244
Fauquier County	1,266	26.12%	558	11.51%	3,023	62.37%			-1,757	-36.25%	4,847
Floyd County	478	21.59%	869	39.25%	867	39.16%			2	0.09%	2,214
Fluvanna County	332	22.30%	147	9.87%	1,010	67.83%			-678	-45.53%	1,489
Franklin County	1,565	33.80%	668	14.43%	2,397	51.77%			-832	-17.97%	4,630
Frederick County	1,172	20.06%	403	6.90%	4,268	73.04%			-3,096	-52.99%	5,843
Giles County	1,541	36.81%	1,016	24.27%	1,629	38.92%			-88	-2.10%	4,186
Gloucester County	904	31.16%	235	8.10%	1,762	60.74%			-858	-29.58%	2,901
Goochland County	1,045	36.93%	174	6.15%	1,611	56.93%			-566	-20.00%	2,830
Grayson County	1,743	41.54%	1,663	39.63%	790	18.83%			80	1.91%	4,196
Greene County	193	18.45%	252	24.09%	601	57.46%			-349	-33.37%	1,046
Greensville County	1,054	44.74%	68	2.89%	1,234	52.38%			-180	-7.64%	2,356
Halifax County	1,223	21.45%	380	6.66%	4,099	71.89%			-2,876	-50.44%	5,702
Hanover County	1,443	18.59%	567	7.30%	5,754	74.11%			-4,311	-55.53%	7,764
Henrico County	5,114	13.09%	3,408	8.73%	30,535	78.17%	3	0.01%	-25,421	-65.08%	39,060
Henry County	2,954	41.00%	1,036	14.38%	3,215	44.62%			-261	-3.62%	7,205
Highland County	56	7.41%	255	33.73%	445	58.86%			-190	-25.13%	756
Isle of Wight County	1,627	40.41%	269	6.68%	2,130	52.91%			-503	-12.49%	4,026
James City County	1,079	38.59%	347	12.41%	1,370	49.00%			-291	-10.41%	2,796
King and Queen County	575	42.81%	51	3.80%	717	53.39%			-142	-10.57%	1,343
King George County	571	32.15%	323	18.19%	882	49.66%			-311	-17.51%	1,776
King William County	617	31.85%	113	5.83%	1,207	62.31%			-590	-30.46%	1,937
Lancaster County	760	25.38%	267	8.92%	1,967	65.70%			-1,207	-40.31%	2,994
Lee County	3,024	45.39%	2,325	34.90%	1,313	19.71%			699	10.49%	6,662
Loudoun County	1,941	26.58%	945	12.94%	4,417	60.48%			-2,476	-33.90%	7,303
Louisa County	757	25.38%	212	7.11%	2,014	67.52%			-1,257	-42.14%	2,983
Lunenburg County	704	25.42%	128	4.62%	1,938	69.96%			-1,234	-44.55%	2,770
Madison County	314	16.66%	349	18.51%	1,222	64.83%			-873	-46.32%	1,885
Mathews County	443	23.60%	170	9.06%	1,264	67.34%			-821	-43.74%	1,877
Mecklenburg County	1,502	24.63%	301	4.94%	4,296	70.44%			-2,794	-45.81%	6,099
Middlesex County	273	17.44%	145	9.27%	1,147	73.29%			-874	-55.85%	1,565
Montgomery County	1,823	22.48%	1,973	24.32%	4,315	53.20%			-2,342	-28.88%	8,111
Nelson County	369	19.39%	172	9.04%	1,362	71.57%			-993	-52.18%	1,903
New Kent County	493	38.46%	76	5.93%	713	55.62%			-220	-17.16%	1,282
Northampton County	994	33.73%	225	7.63%	1,728	58.64%			-734	-24.91%	2,947
Northumberland County	622	25.98%	169	7.06%	1,603	66.96%			-981	-40.98%	2,394
Nottoway County	1,093	27.87%	224	5.71%	2,605	66.42%			-1,512	-38.55%	3,922
Orange County	504	18.80%	305	11.38%	1,871	69.79%	1	0.04%	-1,367	-50.99%	2,681
Page County	1,071	21.38%	1,630	32.54%	2,308	46.08%			-678	-13.54%	5,009
Patrick County	796	27.99%	685	24.09%	1,363	47.93%			-567	-19.94%	2,844
Pittsylvania County	2,981	26.61%	642	5.73%	7,579	67.66%			-4,598	-41.05%	11,202
Powhatan County	674	34.46%	95	4.86%	1,186	60.63%	1	0.05%	-512	-26.18%	1,956
Prince Edward County	1,224	29.21%	230	5.49%	2,736	65.30%			-1,512	-36.09%	4,190
Prince George County	1,015	32.16%	229	7.26%	1,912	60.58%			-897	-28.42%	3,156
Prince William County	4,030	29.52%	3,204	23.47%	6,418	47.01%			-2,388	-17.49%	13,652
Pulaski County	1,730	29.63%	1,468	25.15%	2,640	45.22%			-910	-15.59%	5,838
Rappahannock County	275	23.19%	107	9.02%	804	67.79%			-529	-44.60%	1,186
Richmond County	253	18.77%	104	7.72%	991	73.52%			-738	-54.75%	1,348
Roanoke County	2,426	16.42%	3,396	22.98%	8,955	60.59%	2	0.01%	-5,559	-37.61%	14,779
Rockbridge County	451	17.99%	428	17.07%	1,627	64.90%	1	0.04%	-1,176	-46.91%	2,507
Rockingham County	1,262	15.32%	2,291	27.81%	4,685	56.86%	1	0.01%	-2,394	-29.05%	8,239
Russell County	2,927	41.74%	2,710	38.64%	1,376	19.62%			217	3.10%	7,013
Scott County	2,875	38.32%	3,039	40.51%	1,588	21.17%			-164	-2.19%	7,502
Shenandoah County	881	12.70%	2,566	37.00%	3,489	50.30%			-923	-13.30%	6,936
Smyth County	2,329	29.19%	2,214	27.74%	3,437	43.07%			-1,108	-13.88%	7,980
Southampton County	1,305	33.05%	165	4.18%	2,479	62.78%			-1,174	-29.73%	3,949
Spotsylvania County	2,097	52.16%	326	8.11%	1,597	39.73%			500	12.44%	4,020
Stafford County	2,091	38.81%	723	13.42%	2,574	47.77%			-483	-8.96%	5,388
Surry County	850	45.50%	85	4.55%	933	49.95%			-83	-4.44%	1,868
Sussex County	1,419	39.59%	99	2.76%	2,066	57.65%			-647	-18.05%	3,584
Tazewell County	3,054	41.99%	1,545	21.24%	2,674	36.77%			380	5.22%	7,273
Warren County	1,276	31.68%	493	12.24%	2,259	56.08%			-983	-24.40%	4,028
Washington County	2,683	29.77%	2,525	28.02%	3,804	42.21%			-1,121	-12.44%	9,012
Westmoreland County	671	26.90%	170	6.82%	1,653	66.28%			-982	-39.37%	2,494
Wise County	4,703	45.78%	3,757	36.58%	1,811	17.63%	1	0.01%	946	9.20%	10,272
Wythe County	1,099	22.66%	1,463	30.16%	2,287	47.15%	1	0.02%	-824	-16.99%	4,850
York County	1,598	28.41%	725	12.89%	3,302	58.70%			-1,704	-30.29%	5,625
Alexandria City	8,091	38.50%	3,645	17.34%	9,280	44.16%			-1,189	-5.66%	21,016
Bedford City	294	19.10%	208	13.52%	1,037	67.38%			-743	-48.28%	1,539
Bristol City	957	31.89%	384	12.80%	1,660	55.31%			-703	-23.43%	3,001
Buena Vista City	170	18.78%	173	19.12%	562	62.10%			-389	-42.98%	905
Charlottesville City	2,691	32.02%	976	11.61%	4,736	56.36%			-2,045	-24.34%	8,403
Chesapeake City	6,555	39.10%	1,401	8.36%	8,808	52.54%			-2,253	-13.44%	16,764
Clifton Forge City	269	19.81%	171	12.59%	918	67.60%			-649	-47.79%	1,358
Colonial Heights City	459	12.13%	351	9.28%	2,974	78.59%			-2,515	-66.46%	3,784
Covington City	631	26.27%	454	18.90%	1,317	54.83%			-686	-28.56%	2,402
Danville City	2,631	25.69%	735	7.18%	6,874	67.13%			-4,243	-41.44%	10,240
Emporia City	479	29.57%	105	6.48%	1,036	63.95%			-557	-34.38%	1,620
Fairfax City	1,309	30.98%	878	20.78%	2,038	48.24%			-729	-17.26%	4,225
Falls Church City	1,112	35.60%	553	17.70%	1,459	46.70%			-347	-11.11%	3,124
Franklin City	489	32.38%	71	4.70%	950	62.91%			-461	-30.53%	1,510
Fredericksburg City	1,771	43.50%	387	9.51%	1,913	46.99%			-142	-3.49%	4,071
Galax City	681	41.78%	382	23.44%	567	34.79%			114	6.99%	1,630
Hampton City	8,307	41.13%	2,018	9.99%	9,873	48.88%			-1,566	-7.75%	20,198
Harrisonburg City	457	14.42%	664	20.95%	2,048	64.61%	1	0.03%	-1,384	-43.66%	3,170
Hopewell City	1,286	27.29%	382	8.11%	3,045	64.61%			-1,759	-37.32%	4,713
Lexington City	406	27.68%	261	17.79%	799	54.46%	1	0.07%	-393	-26.79%	1,467
Lynchburg City	2,589	21.92%	1,130	9.57%	8,094	68.52%			-5,505	-46.60%	11,813
Martinsville City	1,818	37.79%	560	11.64%	2,433	50.57%			-615	-12.78%	4,811
Newport News City	9,622	40.51%	2,177	9.17%	11,948	50.31%	3	0.01%	-2,326	-9.79%	23,750
Norfolk City	20,816	45.38%	4,683	10.21%	20,372	44.41%	1	0.00%	444	0.97%	45,872
Norton City	410	39.08%	327	31.17%	312	29.74%			83	7.91%	1,049
Petersburg City	4,025	47.84%	335	3.98%	4,053	48.17%	1	0.01%	-28	-0.33%	8,414
Portsmouth City	10,592	41.34%	2,179	8.50%	12,853	50.16%			-2,261	-8.82%	25,624
Radford City	754	27.25%	768	27.76%	1,245	44.99%			-477	-17.23%	2,767
Richmond City	20,487	35.50%	3,479	6.03%	33,740	58.47%			-13,253	-22.97%	57,706
Roanoke City	4,443	22.32%	4,016	20.18%	11,443	57.49%	1	0.01%	-7,000	-35.17%	19,903
Salem City	864	18.29%	1,016	21.50%	2,843	60.17%	2	0.04%	-1,827	-38.67%	4,725
South Boston City	319	17.56%	167	9.19%	1,330	73.20%	1	0.06%	-1,011	-55.64%	1,817
Staunton City	1,104	21.11%	1,081	20.67%	3,043	58.19%	1	0.02%	-1,939	-37.08%	5,229
Suffolk City	617	28.03%	147	6.68%	1,437	65.29%			-820	-37.26%	2,201
Virginia Beach City	8,434	36.02%	3,192	13.63%	11,787	50.34%	1	0.00%	-3,353	-14.32%	23,414
Waynesboro City	732	19.15%	1,042	27.26%	2,048	53.58%			-1,006	-26.32%	3,822
Williamsburg City	613	36.29%	234	13.85%	842	49.85%			-229	-13.56%	1,689
Winchester City	648	17.55%	157	4.25%	2,887	78.20%			-2,239	-60.64%	3,692
Totals	294,582	31.15%	144,765	15.31%	506,237	53.54%	30	0.00%	-211,655	-22.38%	945,614

== Aftermath ==
Byrd did not vote with Republicans to organize the Senate, continuing to caucus with the majority Democratic Party. Despite continued pressure from Nixon and in 1981 from Ronald Reagan, Byrd never joined the Republican Party before retiring from the Senate in 1983. However, several conservatives who had supported Byrd's campaign, including former governor Mills Godwin, soon joined the Republicans, leading to a period of remarkable success in the state in the 1970s.

Linwood Holton continued his downward trend in Virginia Republican politics, supporting losing candidates in the 1971 special election for lieutenant governor and the 1972 election for Republican Party chairman. He ran for United States Senate himself in 1978 but finished a distant third on the first ballot at the Republican state convention before dropping out of the race. In 1998, he said, "Clearly the Byrd record in Virginia was racist. I just didn't want that in there. ... But if I'm a pariah on the basis of trying to keep out the white supremacy element, I'm proud of it." He endorsed Barack Obama for president of the United States in 2008.

== See also ==
- 1970 United States Senate elections
