= John B. Boatwright =

American politician (1881–1965)

Member of the Virginia House of Delegates for Appomattox and Buckingham
- In office January 8, 1936 – January 13, 1960
- Preceded by: Albert J. Terrell
- Succeeded by: William A. Pennington

Member of the Virginia House of Delegates for Buckingham and Cumberland
- In office January 11, 1922 – January 9, 1924
- Preceded by: A. Laurie Pitts Jr.
- Succeeded by: John R. Horsley; E. T. Bondurant

Personal details
- Born: John Baker Boatwright; November 27, 1881 Marion, Virginia, U.S.
- Died: March 28, 1965 (aged 83) Buckingham, Virginia, U.S.
- Party: Democratic
- Spouse: Grae Nalle Jones (m. 1912; died 1965)
- Children: 5
- Relatives: Frederic W. Boatwright
- Education: University of Richmond School of Law
- Profession: Politician; lawyer

John Baker Boatwright (November 27, 1881 – March 28, 1965) was a Virginia lawyer and member of the Virginia House of Delegates representing Buckingham, Appomattox and Cumberland Counties for 38 years beginning in 1922. A member of the Byrd Organization, Boatwright became a leader of its Massive Resistance to racial integration.

== Early and family life ==
John Baker Boatwright was born in Marion, Virginia, in 1881 to Baptist minister (and former Confederate chaplain) Reuben Baker Boatwright (1831-1913) and his wife Maria Elizabeth Woodruff of Cumberland County, Virginia. The family moved to Buckingham in 1894. His elder brother Frederic W. Boatwright eventually became president of the Richmond College where he served 51 years and for whom the main library is named. The Reuben Boatwright family also included at least three daughters. He graduated from the University of Richmond School of Law in 1908.

John Boatwright married Grace Nalle Jones, daughter of Germain Briand Jones, in 1912, and the couple had two sons and three daughters, John B. Jr., Frederick L., Louise, Carolyn and Nancy. His wife predeceased him in 1965. His son John Jr. was a lawyer and secretary of the Gray Commission and later for the Virginia legislature helping it adopt uniform state laws.

== Political career ==
Boatwright was admitted to the bar in 1908 and worked for the U.S. State Department for several years. He began a general legal practice in Buckingham, Virginia in 1914. He was active in the state bar, as well as with the Baptist Church, Modern Woodmen fraternal benefit society, Ruritans society and local game conservation club. He was elected to the Virginia House of Delegates in 1921 from Buckingham and re-elected 18 times. He initially served the 23rd District, but after redistricting in 1936 represented the 59th district. Boatwright decided not to run for reelection in 1959, but remained secretary of the Buckingham County Democratic party until his death (after a brief illness) six years later.

Boatwright helped write and implement many of the Massive Resistance laws which were passed in a special section of the Virginia General Assembly called by Governor Thomas B. Stanley in August 1956. The legislation exceeded the recommendations of the Gray Commission on which State Senator Garland Gray, Boatwright, Charles R. Fenwick and other Byrd loyalists sat, and for which David J. Mays served as counsel. (Mays defended segregation in several legal cases, including the anti-NAACP legislation later sponsored by John Boatwright Sr., as well as sat on the University of Richmond board of directors). Seven laws were directed against the NAACP and other organizations challenging racial segregation within the Commonwealth, and approved by the General Assembly on September 29, 1956. The principal draftsman, Fenwick, represented Arlington (one of the school districts being sued, and which by June had issued a plan proposing to accept the judicial desegregation order). Governor Stanley, Boatwright and others in the Byrd Organization proposed to close any school desegregating, even if doing so pursuant to court order. The legislators adopted them despite Mays' opinion that courts would declare them unconstitutional, as eventually happened.

== Boatwright Committee ==
Boatwright chaired the new Committee on Offenses against the Administration of Justice, initially with his son John B. Boatwright Jr. as its Secretary and Harold V. Kelly of the Division of Statutory Research and Drafting as the other clerk and assistant counsel. William H. King of Richmond was the Committee's counsel (the partner at what eventually became McGuireWoods would serve as President of the Virginia State Bar in 1963-1964).

The President of the Senate appointed lawyer-senators E. Almer Ames Jr. of Onancock and Earl A. Fitzpatrick of Roanoke, to the committee (the latter becoming Vice-Chairman). The Speaker of the House of Delegates appointed Boatwright, and fellow lawyer-delegates William F. Stone and J. J. Williams Jr. Beginning in January 1957, the committee issued letters requesting information from the NAACP as well as the Defenders of State Sovereignty and Individual Liberties and other segregationist organizations. During the next month, it began subpoenaing NAACP membership lists. These activities prompted litigation (NAACP motions to quash the subpoenas) in Richmond and several Virginia counties, which eventually became part of the record submitted to the U.S. Supreme Court in NAACP v. Button, argued twice and finally decided in 1963. The subpoenas and other activities soon reduced NAACP membership in Virginia by half.

In March 1957 the Boatwright Committee formally opined that various segregationist organizations did not commit the expanded legal offenses of champerty, maintenance, barratry, running and capping, nor the unauthorized practice of law. The commission did not hold any public hearings at this time, but participated in the NAACP litigation, which included testimony by attorney witnesses as well as parents of client plaintiffs.

The Committee's initial report issued November 13, 1957 recommended enforcement of the new laws against the various NAACP lawyers who had testified in that litigation.

Meanwhile, young delegate James M. Thomson of Alexandria (Senator Byrd's son-in-law) chaired the other new investigative committee, the Committee on Law Reform and Racial Activities (a/k/a Thomson Committee). Thomson's aggressive questioning of printer David H. Scull (a Quaker from Annandale) concerning a pro-desegregation pamphlet, led to Scull's being cited for contempt by an Arlington court, which the U.S. Supreme Court reversed in Scull v. Virginia ex rel. Committee on Law Reform & Racial Activities on May 4, 1959.

After the unfavorable Scull decision, the Thomson Committee was merged with this committee. Stone had been elected to the Senate but remained on the committee; Senator Ames and Delegate J.J. Williams left the committee. Thomson and delegates Francis B. Gouldman of Fredericksburg and Frank P. Moncure of Stafford were added, together with Senator Joseph C. Hutcheson of Lawrenceville(former president of the Commonwealth's Attorney Association). The revised committee held a hearing in Floyd, Virginia on July 27, 1959. There, it questioned NAACP attorney Reuben E. Lawson of Roanoke (with Samuel Wilbert Tucker serving as his counsel), as well as James L. Walker of the Harriss-Hart School Parent Teacher Association and nearly a dozen parents about a lawsuit that Lawson had filed against the Floyd County school board. Some husbands testified that they did not sign up for the litigation but their wives went to meetings; others admitted signing papers and considered Lawson their attorney, but testified they did not pay the lawyers employed in the litigation and expected the NAACP or PTA paid them, or said that they really didn't understand the litigation but wanted their children to go to school (whether at the black high school out-of-county in Christiansburg, Virginia or to Check High School or Floyd High School in the county, or a proposed new black high school in Floyd County). James H. Combs, superintendent of the Floyd County schools testified that he received a petition about the matter in April 1958 and that at least once he told the Harris-Hart school principal to forbid Lawson from speaking to the PTA on school property.

On December 14, 1959 the committee issued a 13-page report on offenses including barratry, champerty, running and capping. The report complained that the Virginia State Bar was spending more than $5000 on a Jamestown commemoration and $6250 on a new continuing legal education program, but not "ridding it of those unethical influences which discredit all lawyers, in bringing about the punishment of those engaged in the unauthorized practice of law". It said that the Virginia State Bar retained A.R. Bowles Jr. of Richmond to bring proceedings against Barnard M. Savage, as well as the Brotherhood of Railroad Trainmen, the NAACP and the NAACP Legal Defense and Education Fund, and also indicated the State Corporation Commission was investigating the NAACP, but otherwise only criticized the NAACP and its chief staff attorney, Oliver W. Hill.

The committee continued after Boatwright's term ended, but was disbanded after a legislative reorganization in 1974. Oddly, the only Virginia State Bar prosecution related to this report was of Samuel W. Tucker, and began in Emporia in 1960. Both Tucker of Emporia and "Bernard M. Savage of Baltimore" had been mentioned in the committee's 1957 report, but Tucker only in the "Offense of Unprofessional Conduct" section, together with future 4th Circuit Court of Appeals judge Spottswood W. Robinson III and Hill (for both of whom the Richmond federal courthouse is now named), and seven other lawyers from Norfolk, Alexandria, Richmond and Newport News. The 1957 report had accused Savage of champerty, barratry and unauthorized practice of law, the latter two offenses together with the Virginia NAACP's non-lawyer secretary W. Lester Banks of Richmond and non-lawyer Norris W. Tingle of Baltimore. Hill and Robinson were also initially accused of barratry, together with NAACP entities and men from Baltimore, Richmond and Portsmouth who like Walker and Banks, may not have been attorneys.

== Personal life ==
Boatwright died on March 28, 1965. He was cremated.
