= Virginia's 11th House of Delegates district =

Virginia legislative district

Virginia's 11th State House of Delegates district
- District map from the 2023 election
Delegate
Gretchen Bulova; D–Fairfax
- Demographics: 49% White; 10% Black; 14% Hispanic; 21% Asian; 0% Native American; 0% Hawaiian/Pacific Islander; 1% Other; 4% Multiracial
- Population (2024) • Voting age: 89,169; 18
- Registered voters: 61,346

Virginia's 11th House of Delegates district elects one of the 100 members of the Virginia House of Delegates. Located in northern Virginia, District 11 includes the city of Fairfax and parts of Fairfax County. District 11 is represented by Democrat Gretchen Bulova.

== Elections ==
=== 2013 ===
The seat was held by Democrat Sam Rasoul from 2013. Incumbent Onzlee Ware resigned in late 2012 to spend time with an ailing family member, prompting a special election in January 2013. Rasoul won the low-turnout contest, in which just 14% of eligible voters participated. Rasoul earned 70% of the vote, defeating Roanoke’s Republican sheriff Octavia Johnson.

== District officeholders ==
Years	Delegate	Party	Electoral history
January 8, 1958 – September 28, 1991	A. L. Philpott	Democratic	Speaker of the Virginia House of Delegates (1980-91); Died while in office
January 1992 – January 9, 2002	Ward Armstrong	Democratic	Unable to run for reelection due to redistricting
January 9, 2002 – January 2004	Chip Woodrum	Democratic	Declined to seek reelection
January 2004 – January 8, 2014	Onzlee Ware	Democratic	Resigned
January 8, 2014 – January 10, 2024	Sam Rasoul	Democratic	First elected in 2013 (redistricted to the 38th District)
January 10, 2024 – present	David Bulova	Democratic	Redistricted from the 37th District
2026	Gretchen Bulova	Democratic	

== Electoral history ==
Date	Election	Candidate	Party	Votes	%
Virginia House of Delegates, 11th district
Nov 6, 2001	General	C. A. Woodrum	Democratic	10,783	100.0
Nov 6, 2001	General	Write Ins		4	0
Nov 4, 2003	General	O. Ware	Democratic	6,403	99.9
Nov 4, 2003	General	Write Ins		4	0.1
Nov 8, 2005	General	O. Ware	Democratic	10,735	99.3
Nov 8, 2005	General	Write Ins		81	0.7
Nov 6, 2007	General	Onzlee Ware	Democratic	4,696	62.1
Nov 6, 2007	General	Delvis Mac O. McCadden	Republican	2,822	37.3
Nov 6, 2007	General	Write Ins		44	0.6
Nov 3, 2009	General	Onzlee Ware	Democratic	7,519	60.3
Nov 3, 2009	General	Troy Bird	Republican	4,934	39.6
Nov 3, 2009	General	Write Ins		19	0.2
Nov 8, 2011	General	Onzlee Ware	Democratic	9,885	97.3
Nov 8, 2011	General	Write Ins		278	2.7
Nov 5, 2013	General	Onzlee Ware	Democratic	13,529	97.2
Nov 5, 2013	General	Write Ins		383	2.8
Jan 7, 2014	Special	Salam Rasoul	Democratic	5,129	70.2
Jan 7, 2014	Special	Octavia Lyvonne Johnson	Republican	2,166	29.6
Jan 7, 2014	Special	Write Ins		14	0.2
Nov 3, 2015	General	Salam Rasoul	Democratic	11,216	96.2
Nov 3, 2015	General	Write Ins		447	3.8
Nov 7, 2017	General	Salam Rasoul	Democratic	15,667	96.9
Nov 7, 2017	General	Write Ins		496	3.1
Nov 5, 2019	General	Salam Rasoul	Democratic	10,269	94.4
Nov 5, 2019	General	Write Ins		611	5.6
Nov 2, 2021	General	Salam Rasoul	Democratic	14,532	64.5
Nov 2, 2021	General	Charles Henry Nave	Republican	7,963	35.3
Nov 2, 2021	General	Write Ins		37	0.2
Nov 7, 2023	General	David L. Bulova	Democratic	15,863	70.6
Nov 7, 2023	General	Almira Mohammed	Republican	6,530	29.1
Nov 7, 2023	General	Write Ins		73	0.3
