= Onzlee Ware =

American politician (1954–2024)

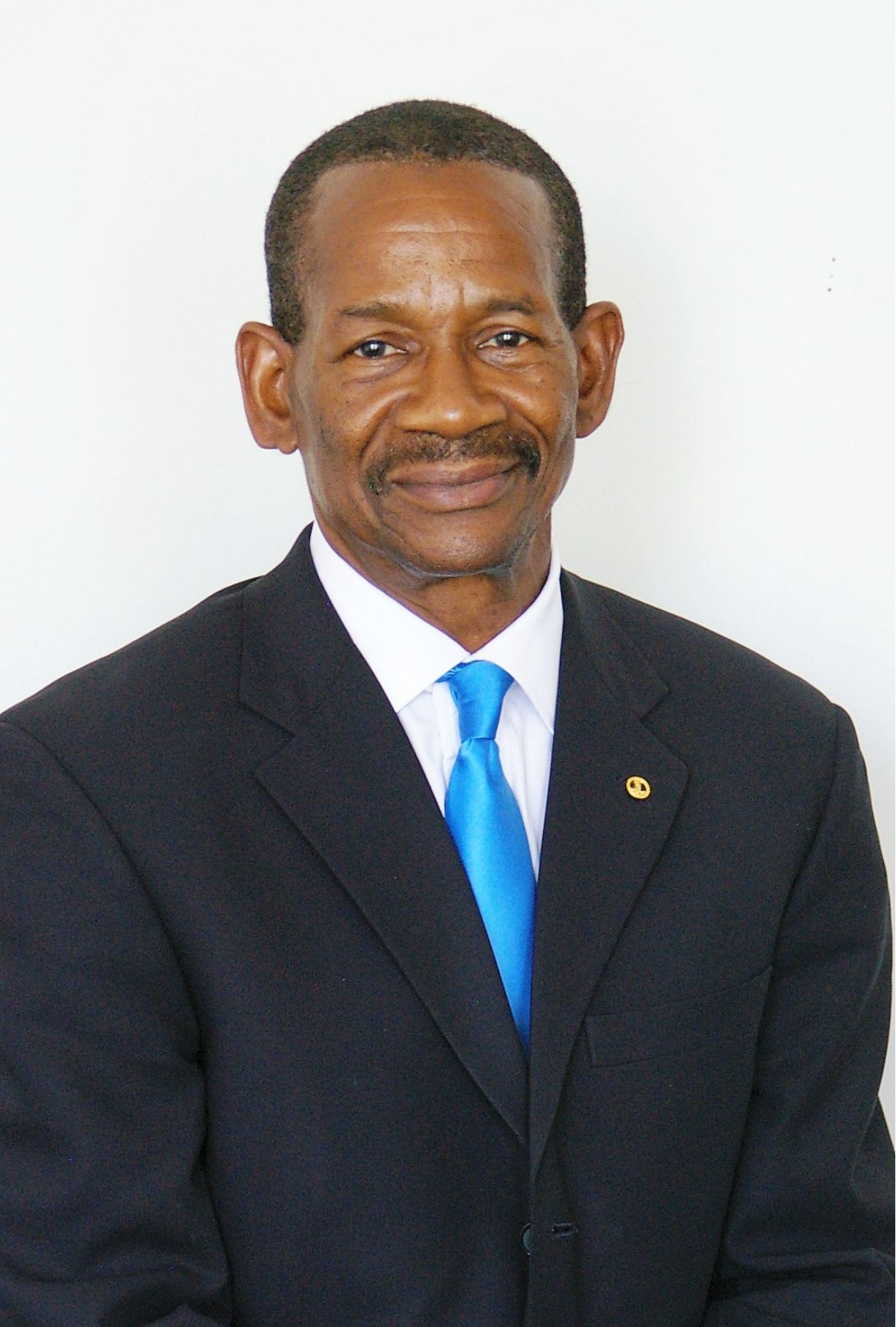

Member of the Virginia House of Delegates from the 11th district
- In office January 14, 2004 – January 8, 2014
- Preceded by: Chip Woodrum
- Succeeded by: Sam Rasoul

Personal details
- Born: January 4, 1954 Greensboro, North Carolina, U.S.
- Died: February 10, 2024 (aged 70)
- Party: Democratic
- Children: Gabrielle
- Education: North Carolina Agricultural and Technical State University; North Carolina Central School of Law
- Profession: Lawyer
- Committees: Appropriations; Counties, Cities and Towns; Education
- Website: delegateonzleeware.com

Onzlee Ware (January 4, 1954 – February 10, 2024) was an American politician and judge. A Democrat, he was elected to the Virginia House of Delegates in November 2003. He formerly represented the 11th District, which is made up of part of the City of Roanoke. He also served as the Minority Caucus Sergeant at Arms.

In November 2013, Ware announced his resignation from the House of Delegates, citing family issues. Ware then became the chief judge for Roanoke County Juvenile and Domestic Relations District Court, in the 23rd Judicial District of Virginia, sworn in on September 18, 2014.

Ware died on February 10, 2024, at the age of 70.

== Electoral history ==
Democratic Primary for Virginia House of Delegates, District 11: Results 2003 to 2011
Year	Democrat	Votes	Pct	Democrat	Votes	Pct
June 10, 2003	Onzlee Ware	1,898	56.44%	Brian Shepard	1,465	43.56%
June 9, 2009	Onzlee Ware	1,877	68.5%	Martin Jeffrey	863	31.49%

General Election for Virginia House of Delegates, District 11: Results 2003 to 2011
Year	Democrat	Votes	Pct	Republican	Votes	Pct	Third Party	Party	Votes	Pct
November 4, 2003	Onzlee Ware	6,403	99.94%	No Candidate			Write-Ins		4	.06%
November 8, 2005	Onzlee Ware	10,735	99.25%	No Candidate			Write-Ins		81	.75%
November 6, 2007	Onzlee Ware	4,696	62.09%	No Candidate			Delvis McCadden	Independent	2,822	37.31%
November 3, 2009	Onzlee Ware	7,519	60.28%	Troy Bird	4,934	39.56%	Write-Ins		19	.15%
November 8, 2011	Onzlee Ware	9,885	97.26%	No Candidate			Write-ins		278	2.73%
