= William F. Stone =

American politician (1909–1973)

William Francis Stone

Member of the Virginia Senate from the 13th district
- In office January 1958 – August 18, 1973
- Preceded by: Frank P. Burton
- Succeeded by: Virgil H. Goode Jr.

Member of the Virginia House of Delegates from the Martinsville, Virginia, Patrick and Henry Counties district
- In office January __, 1954 – 1957
- Preceded by: Willey R. Broaddus
- Succeeded by: Robert L. Clark and Albert L. Philpott

Personal details
- Born: September 29, 1909 Stoneville, North Carolina, U.S.
- Died: August 18, 1973 (aged 63) Martinsville, Virginia, U.S.
- Party: Democratic
- Spouse: M. Ivey Courtney
- Education: Washington and Lee University; Atlanta Law School
- Profession: Lawyer

William Francis Stone (September 29, 1909 – August 18, 1973) was Virginia lawyer and member of the Virginia General Assembly. He represented Martinsville as well as Patrick and Henry Counties between 1954 and 1957, He first served as a delegate and was then elected to a partial senate term in a special 1957 special election following the death of Frank P. Burton. A member of the Byrd Organization, Stone was also a member of the Boatwright Committee which investigated the NAACP as part of the Massive Resistance to racial integration vowed by U.S. Senator Harry F. Byrd after the U.S. Supreme Court decisions in Brown v. Board of Education.

== Early and family life ==
William Stone was born in Stoneville, Rockingham County, North Carolina, to Robert Tyler Stone (1865 - 1944) and his wife Mary Starling Hamlin Stone (1877 - 1965). He had at least four brothers who survived into the 1960s, including T. Clarence Stone, who served in both houses of the North Carolina legislature and was also active in opposing civil rights activists. William Stone received an LL.B. degree from Washington and Lee University in Lexington, Virginia, in 1933. He received an LLM degree from the Atlanta Law School in Georgia in 1936. He married M. Ivey Courtney.

During World War II, Stone served in the U.S. Navy, earning the rank of Lieutenant Commander. Upon returning home, he was active in his Presbyterian church, the Kiwanis, and the Virginia Bar, being elected its vice president in 1953 and serving on its board of law examiners beginning in 1955.

== Political career ==
Stone served as Martinsville's city attorney from 1957 until 1958. He was also a director of the Piedmont Trust Bank.

In 1954 he and William F. Carter were elected as the two delegates from Henry and Patrick Counties and Martinsville; Willey R. Broaddus Jr. had previously represented Henry County and Martinsville. Stone was re-elected in 1955. When state senator Frank P. Burton died in 1957, Stone ran for the seat, and was elected, thus representing a district that included Danville, Martinsville as well as Henry, Patrick and Pittsylvania Counties along with incumbent Landon R. Wyatt. In the same 1957 general election, Robert Lybrook Clark and Henry County Commonwealth attorney Albert L. Philpott won election as the two delegates representing Henry and Patrick Counties and Martinsville.

As part of Massive Resistance, the Virginia General Assembly passed the Stanley Plan in September 1956. Among the various laws were seven expanding the common law legal offenses of champerty, maintenance, barratry, running and capping, as well as the statutory violation of unauthorized practice of law. The legislature then appointed two committees to investigate the NAACP, which was pursuing the legal cases to desegregate Virginia schools. The Speaker of the House of Delegates appointed John B. Boatwright to chair the new Committee on Offenses against the Administration of Justice, with Stone and J. J. Williams Jr. as members; the President of the Virginia Senate appointed two additional members, E. Almer Ames Jr. of Onancock and Earl A. Fitzpatrick of Roanoke (who became Vice-Chairman). Shortly after the January 1957 began, the committee issued letters requesting information from the NAACP as well as the Defenders of State Sovereignty and Individual Liberties and other segregationist organizations, the following month began subpoenaing NAACP membership lists. These activities prompted litigation (NAACP motions to quash the subpoenas) in Richmond and several Virginia counties. In March, the Boatwright Committee opined that various segregationist organizations did not commit the newly expanded legal offenses of champerty, maintenance, barratry, running and capping, nor the unauthorized practice of law. However, the commission's report issued November 13, 1957, recommended enforcement of those laws against the various named NAACP lawyers. The subpoenas and other activities soon reduced NAACP membership in Virginia by half, but two years later (with Stone remaining on the committee after his elevation to the senate) the committee issued another report and Boatwright complained that the Virginia State Bar was not punishing those lawyers but instead spending $5000 on a Jamestown commemoration and $6350 on a new continuing legal education program. Ultimately, the Virginia State Bar tried to prosecute NAACP attorney Samuel W. Tucker, but a circuit judge in Emporia, Virginia, dismissed the case in 1963.

Stone and Landon P. Wyatt jointly represented the Virginia Senate, District 13, constituting Martinsville and Danville, and Henry, Patrick and Pittsylvania Counties for numerous terms, although the district was renumbered the 12th in the 1965 elections after reapportionment required by Davis v. Mann and the Civil Rights Act of 1965. W. Carrington Thompson succeeded Wyatt after the 1969 election. After the reapportionment required by the 1970 census, Stone was elected to the 20th District, which included Martinsville along with Franklin, Henry and Patrick Counties, but he died after the first session and Virgil H. Goode, Jr. replaced him during the second session.

== Death ==
Stone died in Martinsville on August 19, 1973, and is buried in Stoneville Cemetery. U.S. Route 220 near Martinsville and its intersection with Virginia State Route 57 is named after him.
