= Benjamin H. Woodbridge =

American politician and lawyer (1935–2015)

Member of the Virginia House of Delegates from the 24th district
- In office 1972–1974
- Preceded by: New district
- Succeeded by: Lewis P. Fickett Jr.

Member of the Virginia House of Delegates from the 60th district
- In office 1970–1972
- Preceded by: George Rawlings
- Succeeded by: Redistricting

Personal details
- Born: Benjamin Halsey Woodbridge Jr. May 2, 1935 New York City, U.S.
- Died: June 4, 2015 (aged 80)
- Party: Republican
- Spouse: Carol Jane Coult (m. 1959)
- Children: 4
- Education: University of Virginia (BS); University of Virginia School of Law
- Occupation: Politician; lawyer

Benjamin Halsey Woodbridge Jr. (May 2, 1935 – June 4, 2015) was an American politician and lawyer from Virginia. He served in the Virginia House of Delegates from 1970 to 1974.

== Early life ==
Benjamin Halsey Woodbridge Jr. was born on May 2, 1935, in New York City, to Helen Frances (née Flansburgh) and Benjamin Halsey Woodbridge Sr. He graduated from the University of Virginia with a Bachelor of Science in 1957 and he graduated from the University of Virginia School of Law in 1963. He was a member of Phi Alpha Delta fraternity.

== Career ==
Woodbridge served as a lieutenant in the United States Marine Corps from 1954 to 1958. He lived in Alexandria, Virginia, for a time and worked at Chase Manhattan Bank in New York City. He practiced criminal defense and personal injury law in Fredericksburg, Virginia, and through Virginia for more than 50 years. His started practicing law in Fredericksburg in 1964 and his practice was called Woodbridge and Smith.

Woodbridge was a Republican. In 1969, his campaign against Democratic incumbent George Rawlings for the Virginia House of Delegates ran on a few platforms, including law and order, drug abuse controls and criticizing "certain unwholesome activities" at the University of Mary Washington. He served in the Virginia House of Delegates, representing the 60th district, from 1970 to 1972, and representing the new 24th district, from 1972 to 1974. He did not seek re-election in 1974. Following his election, he criticized the University of Mary Washington for allowing drinking on campus. He was a member of the road and internal navigation, auditing, corporations insurance and banking, courts of justice and the mining and mineral resources committees. In 1983, he ran for the Republican nomination for the 17th district for Virginia Senate, but lost to Patrick McSweeney.

Woodbridge was a member of the board of visitors of the University of Mary Washington from June 1981 to 1985. He was a member of the VA Medical Malpractice Review Panel from 1980 to his death. He was a member of the board of directors of Big Brothers of America and was secretary and treasurer of the 39th Judicial Circuit Bar Association. He was vice president of the Fredericksburg Rescue Squad.

== Personal life ==
Woodbridge married Carol Jane Coult, daughter of Charles C. Coult of Factoryville, Pennsylvania, on December 12, 1959, at Factoryville Methodist Church. They had four sons, Benjamin Halsey III, John Coult, Matthew Charles and David Randolph.

Woodbridge lived in Fredericksburg. He died of heart failure on June 4, 2015.
