= Leonard G. Muse =

American politician

Member of the Virginia Senate from the Roanoke district
- In office January 1936 – January 1948
- Preceded by: Abram P. Staples
- Succeeded by: Earl A. Fitzpatrick

Personal details
- Born: January 1, 1897 Roanoke, Virginia, US
- Died: November 11, 1994 (aged 97) Roanoke, Virginia, US
- Party: Democratic
- Spouse: Martha Page Stone
- Education: Roanoke College; University of Virginia Law School
- Profession: Lawyer

Leonard Gaston Muse (January 1, 1897 – November 11, 1994) was a Virginia lawyer and state senator who represented Roanoke between 1936 and 1946. An independent Democrat who often criticized the Byrd Organization, Muse became involved in the Massive Resistance to racial integration vowed by U.S. Senator Harry F. Byrd after the U.S. Supreme Court decisions in Brown v. Board of Education as a member of the state board of education.

== Early and family life ==
Born to Benjamin Franklin Muse and his wife Bertie Minnix Muse in Roanoke, Muse had a sister, Alma (1894-1991). He was educated in the city's public schools, and also graduated from Roanoke College. He then attended the University of Virginia School of Law.

Muse served in World War I, and practiced law and lived with his parents as the Great Depression started. He married Martha Page Stone (1904-1980) in 1931.

== Political career ==
An independent Democrat (what the Byrd Organization called an "Anti", meaning Anti-Byrd Organization), Muse initially served on the Roanoke School Board from 1933 until 1936.

In 1935, Muse ran for the state senate seat in 21st District, then representing Roanoke City and Roanoke County and represented by Abram P. Staples since 1928 and who had been appointed Attorney General of Virginia after the 1934 session had ended. In that 1935 election, District 21 was combined with what had been District 22, which had previously included other parts of Roanoke County as well as Radford as well as Franklin and Montgomery Counties and had Byrd Democrat Harvey B. Apperson of Salem, Virginia (seat of Roanoke County) as its senator. Now, District 21 had two senators and Muse served alongside Apperson. In 1943, legislative redistricting after the 1940 census included creation of a District 36, consisting only of the City of Roanoke (with the Roanoke County and Radford and the other counties remaining in District 21). Muse was elected from that single-member district 36.

In 1945, Muse ran in the Democratic primary for lieutenant governor of Virginia, and came in a distant third to both Byrd Democrats (Senator Harry F. Byrd not having announced his choice): Lewis Collins (who won both the primary and general election, and Charles R. Fenwick (who conceded to Collins after he challenged unusual results in court).

In 1947, Muse lost in the Democratic primary to retain his District 36 seat to fellow lawyer Earl A. Fitzpatrick, a Byrd Democrat, who was elected his successor in the general election that November. Apperson was elected Attorney General of Virginia in that election. Muse nonetheless strongly supported Byrd Democrat John S. Battlefor governor in 1949.

Muse also served on the Virginia Board of Education from 1941 until 1963; he had become its president by the time he retired.

In 1966, Muse was elected chairman of the board of visitors of Radford University.

== Death and legacy ==
Muse died in Roanoke in 1994. Radford University named a co-ed dormitory completed in 1970 for Muse.
