= A. Victor Thomas =

American politician

Vic Thomas

Member of the Virginia House of Delegates
- In office January 9, 1974 – January 14, 2004 Serving with Ray L. Garland (1974–1980); Chip Woodrum (1980–1983)
- Preceded by: John C. Towler
- Succeeded by: William Fralin
- Constituency: 7th district (1974–1982); 6th district (1982–1983); 17th district (1983–2004)

Personal details
- Born: Alfred Victor Thomas; November 9, 1929 Roanoke, Virginia, U.S.
- Died: April 26, 2006 (aged 76) Roanoke, Virginia, U.S.
- Resting place: St. Andrews Diocesan Cemetery, Roanoke, Virginia
- Party: Democratic
- Education: Virginia Southern College; University of Virginia
- Profession: businessman

Alfred Victor "Vic" Thomas (1929–2006) was a Virginia businessman (owner of E. J. Thomas Market) and politician. As a Democrat, he represented parts of Roanoke and Roanoke County, Virginia in the Virginia House of Delegates from 1974 until 2004.

== Early and family life ==
Thomas was born in Roanoke as the Great Depression began. He attended the local public schools, including Jefferson High School. He then attended Virginia Southern College in Buena Vista, and later the University of Virginia in Charlotteville. Thomas served in the U.S. military in the Panama Canal Zone.

He married Dorothy Marie Lucas and had children Alfred V. Thomas Jr., Genevieve C. Thomas, William E. Thomas and Thomas P. Thomas. He was active in his Catholic church and Knights of Pythias.

== Career ==
Thomas owned E.J. Thomas Market. He was also active in the local Chamber of Commerce, Civitan, American Legion, Dokkies and Woodmen of the World

Thomas succeeded John C. Towler and initially served alongside fellow Democrats Ray L. Garland of Roanoke and Richard Cranwell of Salem, Virginia (who would become majority leader). Beginning in 1979 Thomas ran on a Democratic ticket with Chip Woodrum in Roanoke. They handily defeated Republicans Elizabeth T. Bowles and Mary Brooks that year, and soundly defeated Independent Zaman K. McManaway in 1981. His district, which comprised parts of the City of Roanoke as well as the County of Roanoke, was initially numbered the 7th Virginia district (1975–1980), but briefly became the 6th district in 1981 (comprising only the City of Roanoke). Further redistricting required by a judicial decision mandating single-member districts again combined parts of the city and county, and renumbered it as the 17th district. Thomas often faced no opponent when re-elected, but again in 1991 soundly defeated Independent Zaman K. McManaway and Republican Jeffrey L. Artis in 1995.

After the Republican party took control of the House of Delegates in 2000 and approved a partisan redistricting, Thomas won his seat once more. He declined to seek re-election in 2003, and Republican W. H. Fralin Jr. handily defeated both Democrat L.F. Wyatt and Independent G.M. Bowman, and so succeeded him as that Roanoke district's delegate.

== Death and legacy ==
Thomas died in 2006. An environmental award carries his name.
