= Gretchen Bulova =

American politician

Member of the Virginia House of Delegates from the 11th district
- Incumbent
- Assumed office January 14, 2026
- Preceded by: David Bulova

Personal details
- Born: Gretchen Marie Reimer
- Party: Democratic
- Spouse: David Bulova
- Relations: Sharon Bulova (mother-in-law)
- Children: 3
- Education: College of William & Mary; George Washington University
- Website: www.gretchenforvirginia.com

Gretchen Marie Bulova (née Reimer) is an American museum director and politician serving as a member of the Virginia House of Delegates from the 11th district since winning a 2026 special election. She is a member of the Democratic Party and succeeded her husband, David, who was appointed Virginia Secretary of Natural Resources. She has served as director of the Office of Historic Alexandria since January 2019.

== Early life and career ==
Bulova holds a bachelor’s degree in anthropology and classical studies from the College of William & Mary and a master’s degree in museum studies from George Washington University.

She joined the City of Alexandria in 1991 as a part-time collections manager for Gadsby's Tavern, then worked as a curator of ceramics and glass at the Daughters of the American Revolution Museum in Washington, D.C. for two years before returning to Alexandria as the city's records administrator and archivist in 1995. In the same year, she became assistant director of Gadsby's Tavern and in 1996 she was appointed director of the museum until 2015. In 2006, when the Stabler-Leadbeater Apothecary Museum was donated to Alexandria, Bulova also became director of the museum. In 2015, she was appointed the first deputy director of the Office of Historic Alexandria and on November 30, 2017, Bulova began serving as acting director of the Office of Historic Alexandria.

== Virginia House of Delegates ==
After governor-elect Abigail Spanberger announced David Bulova as the next Virginia Secretary of Natural Resources, Bulova announced her campaign for her husband's seat representing the 11th district of the Virginia House of Delegates. In the firehouse primary, she garnered 47% of the vote against four candidates, including former Fairfax city councilmember So Lim, nonprofit executive director Vanessa Cardenas, president of the Miller Heights Neighborhood Association Douglas Shuster, and delegate Karrie Delaney's former chief of staff Denver Supinger. She defeated Republican nominee Adam Wise in the general election on January 13, 2026, with 68.8% of the vote.

== Electoral history ==
Virginia House of Delegates Special General Election: 11th District, 2026
Party	Candidate	Votes	%
Democratic	Gretchen Bulova	5,599	68.8%
Republican	Adam Wise	2,508	30.8%
Write-in		32	0.39%
Total votes		8,139	100.0%
