= William B. Hopkins (Virginia politician) =

American politician

William B. Hopkins Sr.
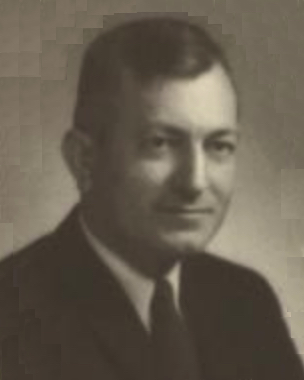

Member of the Virginia Senate
- In office January 13, 1960 – January 9, 1980
- Preceded by: Earl A. Fitzpatrick
- Succeeded by: Ray L. Garland
- Constituency: 35th district (1960‍–‍1966); 32nd district (1966‍–‍1972); 21st district (1972‍–‍1980)

Personal details
- Born: William Benjamin Hopkins; April 15, 1922 Richmond, Virginia, U.S.
- Died: December 11, 2012 (aged 90) Roanoke, Virginia, U.S.
- Party: Democratic
- Spouse: Virginia George
- Education: Washington and Lee University; University of Virginia (LLB)

Military service
- Branch/service: United States Marine Corps; Marine Corps Reserve
- Rank: Major
- Unit: 3rd Marine Division; 1st Marine Division
- Battles/wars: World War II; Pacific theater; Korean War
- Awards: Purple Heart

William Benjamin Hopkins Sr. (April 15, 1922 – December 11, 2012) was an American politician, lawyer and military historian.

== Early life, education and military service ==
Born in Rocky Mount in Franklin County, Virginia, Hopkins graduated from Washington and Lee University a semester early in 1942 so he could join the United States Marine Corps. He served in the South Pacific with the 3rd Marine Division during World War II as part of the Marine's island-hopping operations, including at Guadalcanal and Bougainville. Returning to Virginia, Hopkins remained in the Marine Corps Reserve, and used his G.I. Bill to earn a law degree in 1949 from the University of Virginia Law School.

He began practicing law in Roanoke, but was recalled to active duty in 1950 as the Korean War began. Hopkins commanded H & S Company, 1st Battalion, 1st Marine Division in the fall and winter of 1950. He led troops at the Chosin Reservoir and participated in the Chosin breakout when the Marines and United Nations forces were surrounded by tens of thousands of Chinese troops in minus 35-degree weather. Severely wounded in January 1951, Hopkins spent a year recovering at Portsmouth Naval Hospital in Portsmouth, Virginia. He returned to his Roanoke law practice, Martin, Hopkins & Lemon, in April 1952.

== Political career ==
Hopkins was a lifelong Democrat. For several years, he was chairman of the Roanoke City Democratic Committee. In the July 1959 Democratic primary, he defeated segregationist Earl A. Fitzpatrick during the Commonwealth's Massive Resistance crisis.

Elected to the Virginia State Senate that November, Hopkins served in that part-time position for 18 years, from January 1960 until he was defeated for re-election by Republican Ray L. Garland in 1979. Hopkins ran for U.S. Congress in 1964, but was defeated by Republican Richard H. Poff. He ran unopposed for his state senate seat in 1965, 1967, 1971 and 1975.

He later commented on the political division that racial segregation caused—as he entered the Senate, 19 Democrats were willing to close the public schools to prevent racial integration, and he was among the 19 Democrats classified as "liberal" because they wanted to keep the public schools open, as did the Senate's two Republicans (James Turk of Radford and Floyd Landreth of Carroll County). Initially, Hopkins fought to repeal the poll tax, which had prevented many African Americans, as well as poor whites, from voting. Also, the Byrd Organization's focus on low taxes had resulted in few social services and problem roads. Slowly, taxes were levied: first on cigarettes, whisky and beer, as well as two cents per gallon of gas during the Almond administration. Governor Albertis Harrison managed to pass the first income tax. As the Byrd Organization crumbled, Hopkins helped Governor Mills E. Godwin Jr. (1966-1970) make Virginia's social service infrastructure competitive with other states. The Virginia Community College System was established so Virginians would not have to travel more than 50 miles to receive higher education. To achieve this parity, Virginia enacted a sales tax, as well as improved roads by increased licensing fees. Hopkins also led Virginia's delegation to the 1968 Democratic National Convention, and won re-election despite the Republican landslide in 1969.

Fellow Democratic senators elected Hopkins as their majority leader from 1972 to 1976, when Republican Linwood Holton was governor. From 1973 to 1978 Hopkins served as chairman of the Commission on State Government Management and Reorganization, known as the "Hopkins Commission," which modernized the state's government, with the assistance of Senator Elmon T. Gray of Richmond. In 1995, a University of Virginia newsletter lauded that Commission as the "most effective and comprehensive study of the 20th century." For years Hopkins served as chairman of the State Senate's Committee on Counties, Cities and Towns, and was a senior member of the Senate Finance Committee. He also helped found and fund Roanoke's Center on the Square.

Hopkins remained active in Democratic politics even after his retirement, working to elect Tim Kaine governor and later U.S. senator, as well as to elect Barack Obama president in 2008 and 2012. Hopkins also served as commander of his local American Legion post, and was active in the Veterans of Foreign Wars.

== Later, death and legacy ==
He continued to practice law until 2009, retiring at age 87. He survived Virginia, his wife of 62 years. Bill Hopkins died in 2012, survived by five children and multiple grandchildren.

Hopkins wrote and published two books based on his war experiences. "One Bugle, No Drums: The Marines at Chosin Reservoir," published in 1986 and described as "one of the best first person memoirs of the Korean War." He also published "The Pacific War: The Strategy, Politics, and Players that Won the War," in 2008. Paperback editions of both books remain in print.

Roanoke's planetarium theater, at its science museum in the Center on the Square, is named after Hopkins.

Senate of Virginia
Preceded by Edward L. Breeden Jr.	Senate Majority Leader; 1972–1976	Succeeded by Abe Brault
