= David Bulova =

American politician (born 1969)

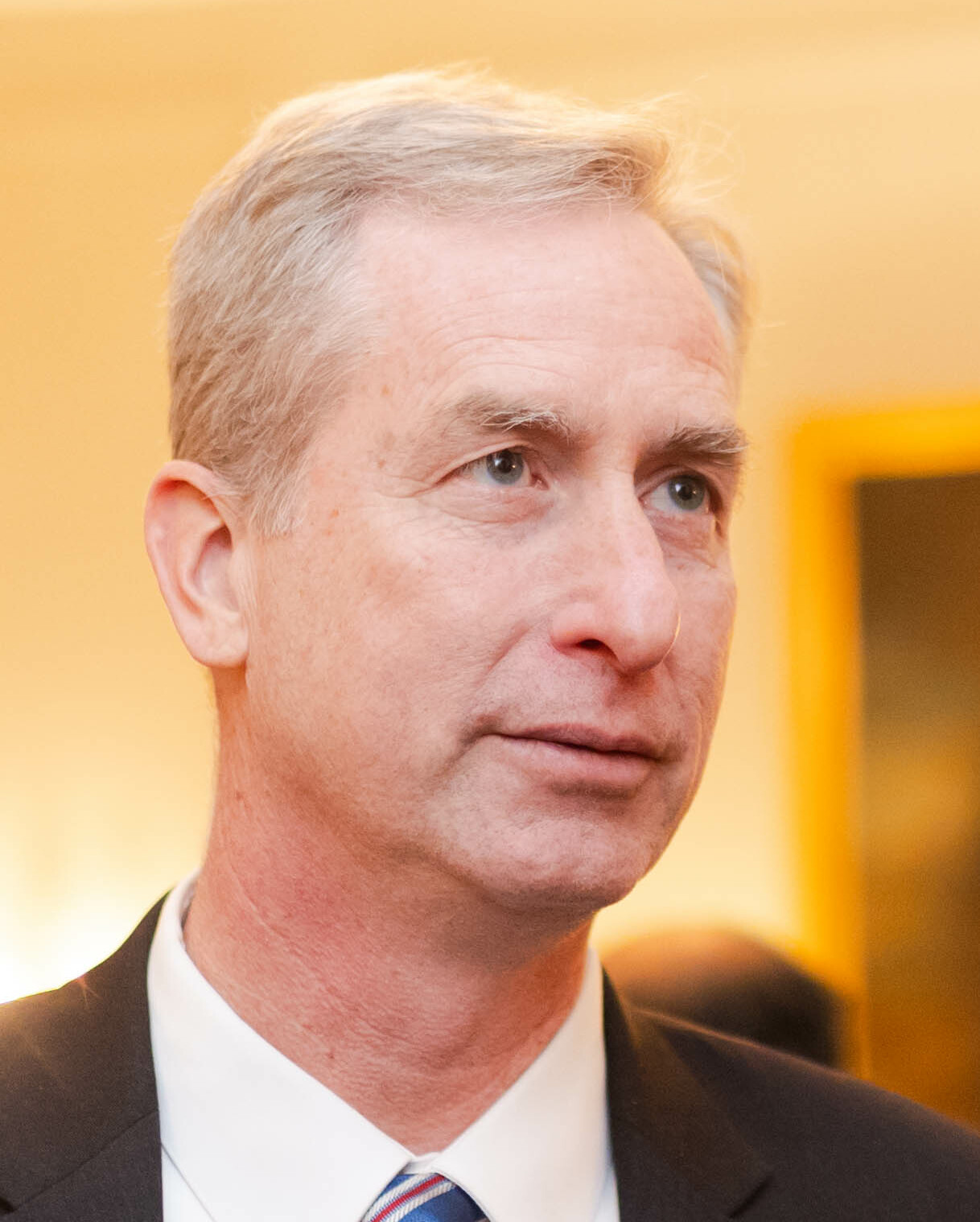
- Bulova in 2024

Virginia Secretary of Natural Resources
- Incumbent
- Assumed office January 17, 2026
- Governor: Abigail Spanberger
- Preceded by: Travis Voyles

Member of the Virginia House of Delegates
- In office January 11, 2006 – January 14, 2026
- Preceded by: Chap Petersen
- Succeeded by: Gretchen Bulova
- Constituency: 37th district (2006–2024); 11th district (2024–2026)

Personal details
- Born: May 6, 1969 (age 57) Fairfax, Virginia, U.S.
- Party: Democratic
- Spouse: Gretchen Marie Reimer
- Parent: Sharon Bulova (mother)
- Education: College of William and Mary; Virginia Tech
- Profession: Environmental planner
- Website: www.davidbulova.com

David L. Bulova (born May 6, 1969) is an American politician of the Democratic Party serving as the Virginia Secretary of Natural Resources. From 2006 to 2026, he served as a member of the Virginia House of Delegates. He currently represented the 11th district, including the city of Fairfax and part of Fairfax County. He is the son of former Fairfax County Board of Supervisors chairman Sharon Bulova.

Bulova has been tapped by Governor-elect Abigail Spanberger to act as her administration's secretary of natural resources.

== Committees ==
Bulova served as Chair of the General Laws Committee and Chair of the Commerce, Agriculture, and Natural Resources Subcommittee in the Appropriations Committee. Additionally, he served as a member of the Education Committee, Agriculture Chesapeake and Natural Resources and Appropriations Committee.
