= Frank P. Burton =

American politician (1888–1956)

Member of the Virginia Senate from the 13th district
- In office 1948 – July 29, 1956
- Succeeded by: William F. Stone

Personal details
- Born: Frank Patteson Burton; February 5, 1888 Lunenburg County, Virginia, U.S.
- Died: July 29, 1956 (aged 68) Vesta, Virginia, U.S.
- Resting place: Stuart Cemetery
- Spouse: Berbee Penn (died)
- Children: 3
- Education: College of William and Mary
- Alma mater: Washington and Lee University School of Law
- Occupation: Politician; lawyer

Frank Patteson Burton (February 5, 1888 – July 29, 1956) was an American politician and lawyer from Virginia. He served as a member of the Virginia Senate from 1948 to his death.

== Early life ==
Frank Patteson Burton was born on February 5, 1888, in Lunenburg County, Virginia. His family moved to Patrick County. At the age of 12, he was a page in the Virginia Senate. He read law with S. A. Thompson of Stuart. He attended the College of William and Mary and graduated from Washington and Lee University School of Law with a law degree in 1912.

== Career ==
Following graduation, Burton practiced law in Stuart. In 1951, he started a partnership his son Lawrence called Burton and Burton. He was mayor of Stuart from 1921 to 1927. In 1923, he was elected commonwealth's attorney and served from 1924 to 1928 and served again from 1931 to February 1948.

Burton was a Democrat. He served as a member of the Virginia Senate, representing the 13th district, from 1948 to his death. He was chairman of the executive expenditures committee and served on the privileges and elections, fish and game, roads, education, and federal relations committees. He was a delegate to the 1940 Democratic National Convention and was a presidential elector-at-large in 1944. He was a member of the Virginia Commission of Game and Inland Fisheries for several years.

== Personal life ==
Burton married Berbee Penn. She predeceased him. They had two sons and a daughter, Lawrence R., Frank P. Jr. and Frances. His son Lawrence was also mayor of Stuart.

Burton died following a heart attack on July 29, 1956, at his home near Lovers' Leap, in Vesta. He was buried in Stuart Cemetery.
