= State Corporation Commission (Virginia) =

Virginia regulatory agency

Agency overview
- Formed: 1902, operational since March 2, 1903
- Preceding agency: Virginia Board of Public Works
- Jurisdiction: Virginia
- Headquarters: Richmond, Virginia
- Employees: 700+
- Agency executives: Jehmal T. Hudson, Commissioner; Samuel T. Towell, Commissioner; Kelsey A. Bagot, Commissioner (Chair)
- Website: State Corporation Commission

Footnotes
- The SCC's authority encompasses utilities, insurance, state-chartered financial institutions, securities, retail franchising, and railroads.

The State Corporation Commission, or SCC, is a Virginian regulatory agency whose authority encompasses utilities, insurance, state-chartered financial institutions, securities, retail franchising, and railroads. It is the state's central filing office for corporations, limited partnerships, limited liability companies and Uniform Commercial Code liens.

== Mission ==
The State Corporation Commission strives to apply law and regulation to balance the interests of citizens, businesses, and customers in regulating Virginia's business and economic concerns and works continually to improve the regulatory and administrative processes.

== Objectives ==
- Fulfill the duties prescribed by the Virginia Constitution and the law enacted by the General Assembly of Virginia fully and to the best of its ability;
- Ensure that all parties and persons who appear before the Commission receive due process of law;
- Provide reliable information and assistance to Virginians in a consistent and high-quality fashion;
- Provide assistance to Virginians who have valid disputes with regulated companies; and
- Adopt rules and regulations that keep pace with legislative, business, economic, social and technological changes.

== Activities ==
Examples of SCC activities include:

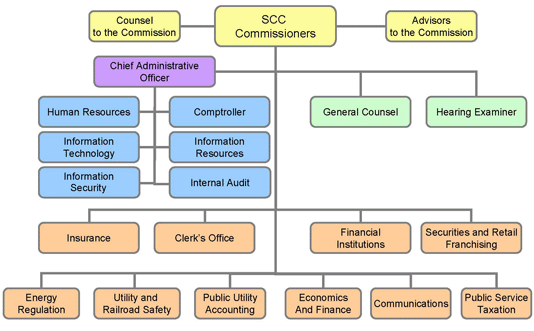
The three Commissioners of the State Corporation Commission oversee 19 divisions.

- Serving as the central filing office for business entities authorized to transact business in Virginia and for UCC financing statements;
- Providing licensing, regulation, examination, and investigation of insurance companies, agencies and agents;
- Regulating securities, brokers, investment advisers and registering franchises and trademarks;
- Regulating Virginia's investor-owned electric, natural gas, water and sewer utilities, and member-owned electric cooperatives;
- Providing oversight for Virginia's telecommunication industry;
- Providing accounting and financial information for the deliberation of utility cases;
- Assessing the property of public service corporations for local taxation, collecting various taxes and fees, and obtaining annual reports;
- Conducting research and developing special studies and forecasts related to economic and financial issues of public utilities;
- Approving rate increases for landline telephone companies, utilities, etc. and approving rate restructuring plans;
- Administering safety programs involving underground utility damage prevention, jurisdictional natural gas and hazardous liquid pipeline facilities, and railroads;
- Protecting consumers through the administration of state laws regarding depository and non-depository financial institutions; and
- Handling and investigating complaints that are energy, telephone, financial, insurance, securities or retail franchising related.

The State Corporation Commission's structure is unique in that it is organized as a separate department of government with delegated administrative, legislative, and judicial powers. The SCC's membership, powers, duties, and procedures are set out in Article IX of the Constitution of Virginia. Section 4 of that Article allows parties aggrieved by the SCC's decisions to appeal to the Virginia Supreme Court.

== Consumer education ==
=== Virginia Energy Sense ===
Virginia Energy Sense is the Commonwealth of Virginia's statewide consumer education and outreach program under the guidance of the SCC to encourage electric energy efficiency and conservation in Virginia households, businesses, and institutions.

Virginia Energy Sense is the statewide program that encourages energy efficiency and conservation.

In 2008, the General Assembly of Virginia directed the SCC to develop and implement an electric energy consumer education program to provide retail customers with information regarding energy conservation, energy efficiency, demand-side management, demand response, and renewable energy.

The goal is for Virginians to reduce electricity consumption by 10% below 2006 levels by 2022.

=== Office of the Managed Care Ombudsman ===
The Office of the Managed Care Ombudsman was created in 1999, enacted by the General Assembly of Virginia and signed into legislation by then-Governor Jim Gilmore. This office is within the SCC's Bureau of Insurance.

The principal function of the Managed Care Ombudsman is to help Virginia consumers who have health care insurance provided by a Managed Care Health Insurance Plan (MCHIP), such as a Health Maintenance Organization or Preferred Provider Organization. The Managed Care Ombudsman can assist consumers in understanding and exercising their rights of appeal of adverse decisions made by MCHIPs.

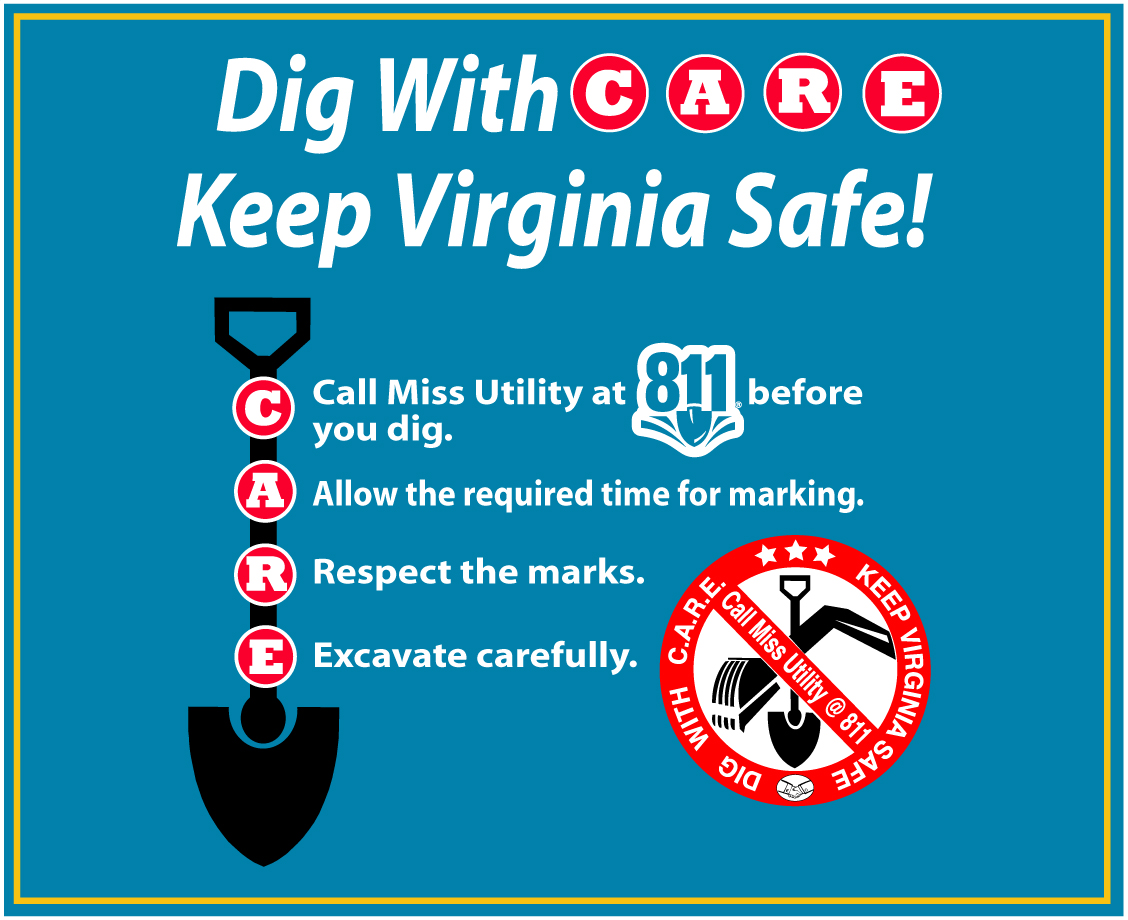
The C.A.R.E. program provides education and training on utility damage prevention.

The Managed Care Ombudsman answers inquiries about MCHIPs and managed care, and helps individuals who experience problems. The Ombudsman also assists individuals in understanding how managed care functions and provides information on the types of MCHIPs available in Virginia. The Ombudsman cannot investigate or resolve complaints, but can refer individuals who have a complaint to the internal review mechanisms at the MCHIP or to the appropriate government agency.

=== C.A.R.E. program ===
Established by the SCC's Division of Utility and Railroad Safety, the C.A.R.E. program is made up of education plans and training modules relative to the Underground Utility Damage Prevention Act, and the Commission Rules for Enforcement of the Act. A statewide Education Executive Committee, with seven members representing excavators, utility operators, locators, the notification center and SCC staff, meet yearly to review the results of the education efforts and recommends an education and training plan for the next year. Education plans have included brand marketing, general outreach and training workshops.

=== Investor Education program ===
The SCC's Division of Securities & Retail Franchising provides Virginians with the investor information needed to make appropriate decisions for their financial future, as well as to avoid investment fraud. This division provides free content associated with the Investor Education program in the form of publications, brochures, and teaching guides, including general outreach and presentations.

== History ==
The Virginia Constitution of 1902 created the SCC to replace the Virginia Board of Public Works and the Office of Railroad Commissioner. The three-member Commission was charged with regulating the state railroads and telephone and telegraph companies and with registering corporations in Virginia. The SCC began operations on March 2, 1903. Since then, the Virginia General Assembly has broadened the SCC's regulatory authority.

The 1902 Constitution vested the SCC with three forms of power—judicial, legislative, and executive. The SCC acts as a court of record and holds formal hearings when warranted. It can enforce its orders by fines or contempt citations. There is a right of appeal to the Virginia Supreme Court from any SCC decision. The SCC's executive authority is exercised in its day-to-day administration. Its legislative authority is exercised when it makes rules or sets rates.

== Composition ==
The SCC is composed of three commissioners, each of whom is appointed by a joint vote of both houses of the Virginia Legislature. No person shall be eligible to serve as a member of the Commission unless at the time of his election or appointment he is a qualified voter under Virginia law. However, at least one member of the commission must, at any given time, meet the requirements set forth for judges of a Virginia court of record. The commissioners serve six year terms, and their appointment is staggered, so that a new appointment or reappointment vote occurs every two years.

=== Current members ===
Name	Notable previous employment	Start	Term end	Education	Partisan control at election	
Name	Notable previous employment	Start	Term end	Education	House of Delegates	Senate
Kelsey A. Bagot, Current Chair	Senior Attorney at NextEra Energy	April 1, 2024	January 31, 2030	American University (bachelor), Harvard (JD)	Democratic (+2)	Democratic (+2)
Jehmal T. Hudson,	Vice President of Government Affairs at the National Hydropower Association, Regulatory practitioner at FERC	July 6, 2020 (Note: Appointed by the Governor of Virginia as a member of the State Corporation Commission for a term ending thirty days after the commencement of the next regular session of the General Assembly, to fill the vacancy resulting from the departure of Patricia L. West)	January 31, 2026	Adelphi University (BA), Vermont Law School (JD), Georgetown Law (LLM)	Democratic (+10)	Democratic (+4)
Jehmal T. Hudson,	Vice President of Government Affairs at the National Hydropower Association, Regulatory practitioner at FERC	February 1, 2026 (Note: Elected to a second consecutive term)	January 31, 2032	Adelphi University (BA), Vermont Law School (JD), Georgetown Law (LLM)	Democratic (+2)	Democratic (+2)
Samuel T. Towell,	Associate General Counsel for Litigation at Smithfield Foods, Inc.	March 20, 2024 (Note: Elected by the General Assembly to fill an unexpired term ending January 31, 2028)	January 31, 2028	MIT (BS), UVA Law (JD)	Democratic (+2)	Democratic (+2)

=== Past and present members ===
- Beverley T. Crump (1903–1907)
- Henry C. Stuart (1903–1908)
- Henry Fairfax (1903–1905)
- Joseph E. Willard (1905–1910)
- Robert R. Prentis (1907–1916)
- William F. Rhea (1908–1925)
- J.R. Wingfield (1910–1918)
- C.B. Garnett (1910–1918)
- Alexander Forward (1918–1923)
- Robert E. Williams (1918–1919)
- S.L. Lupton (1918–1919)
- Berkley D. Adams (1919–1928)
- Oscar L. Shewmake (1923–1924)
- H. Lester Hooker (1924–1972)
- Louis S. Epes (1925–1929)
- William Meade Fletcher (1928–1943)
- George C. Peery (1929–1933)
- Thomas W. Ozlin (1933–1944)
- Harvey B. Apperson (1944–1947)
- Robert O. Norris (1944–1944)
- L. McCarthy Downs (1944–1949)
- W. Marshall King (1947–1957)
- Ralph T. Catterall (1949–1973)
- Jesse W. Dillon (1957–1972)
- Preston C. Shannon (1972–1996)
- Junie L. Bradshaw (1972–1985)
- Thomas P. Harwood, Jr. (1973–1992)
- Elizabeth B. Lacy (1985–1988)
- Theodore V. Morrison, Jr. (1989–2007)
- Hullihen Williams Moore (1992–2004)
- Clinton Miller (1996–2006)
- Mark Christie (2004–2021)
- Judith Williams Jagdmann (2006–2022)
- James C. Dimitri (2008–2018)
- Patricia L. West (2019–2020)
- Jehmal T. Hudson (2020–present)
- Angela L. Navarro (2021–2022)
- Samuel T. Towell (2024–present)
- Kelsey A. Bagot (2024–present)

== See also ==
- List of company registers
- Public Utilities Commission
