= Ray L. Garland =

American politician in Virginia

Ray Garland
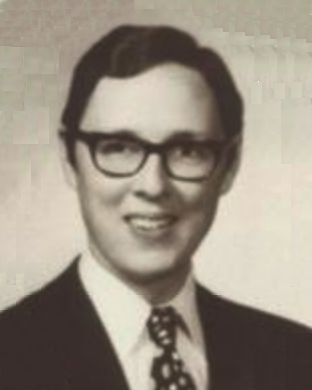

Member of the Virginia Senate from the 21st district
- In office January 9, 1980 – January 11, 1984
- Preceded by: William B. Hopkins
- Succeeded by: Granger Macfarlane

Member of the Virginia House of Delegates
- In office January 12, 1972 – January 9, 1980 Serving with John C. Towler (1972–1974); Vic Thomas (1974–1980)
- Preceded by: M. Caldwell Butler
- Succeeded by: Chip Woodrum
- Constituency: 7th district
- In office January 10, 1968 – January 12, 1972
- Preceded by: Robert W. Spessard
- Succeeded by: Raymond Robrecht
- Constituency: 17th district

Personal details
- Born: Ray Lucian Garland; May 20, 1934 (age 92) Roanoke, Virginia, U.S.
- Party: Republican
- Spouse: Jane Morriss (m. 1982)
- Education: Roanoke College (BA); University of Virginia (MA)

Ray Lucian Garland (born May 20, 1934) is an American businessman and Republican politician who served in both houses of the Virginia General Assembly representing Roanoke, and who later wrote a syndicated newspaper column.

== Early and family life ==
Born in Roanoke during the Great Depression, with brothers 15 and 11 years older than himself, Garland attended the city's public schools, then Roanoke College where he earned a bachelor's degree in history, all while working part-time at small drug stores that his father owned in Roanoke and at which various relatives worked. Both his mother and father had moved to Roanoke after meeting at the Botetourt County high school in Buchanan, Virginia, since his mother came from Goochland, which then had no high school for women and her grandfather in Buchanan wanted her to get an education. She later took courses at Virginia's normal school and taught in Botetourt county until her marriage. Because he had four brothers and would not inherit the family farm near Buchanan, Walter Garland had moved to Roanoke where he lived at a boarding house operated by an aunt until his marriage, and took a soda fountain job at Clore's drugstore, to which he returned after some time as a clerk for the Norfolk and Western Railroad, and would later buy out his benefactor and acquire other small drug stores. Although Walter Garland never attended college, he insisted that his sons earn college degrees. His eldest son (Walter Jr.) attended the Virginia Military Institute and became a doctor. His second son, Robert Garland, attended Fork Union Military Academy before joining the army during World War II and worked in a pharmacy before discharge and earning a pharmacy degree from the Medical College of Virginia. Although his parents hoped Ray would also earn a pharmacy degree, he instead loved history, and taught in the local schools after college, and later at his alma mater while earning a Master's degree in history from the University of Virginia. Garland later traveled overseas during several summers for further studies at the University of London.

== Career ==
Garland first won election to the Virginia House of Delegates (a part-time position) in 1968, as the Byrd Organization crumbled together with its Massive Resistance to school desegregation. Ray Garland would win re-election to the state house six times, serving alongside Democrats when it was a multi-member district, although he also advocated creation of single-member districts. In 1979 Garland unseated former Senate majority leader, Democrat William B. Hopkins but only served one four-year term before losing to Democrat (and hotel-keeper) Granger Macfarlane. Meanwhile, his unassuming (but customer-savvy) pharmacist elder brother Bob Garland, in addition to expanding the family's drug store business, also served on Roanoke's city council for 24 years, from 1962 until 1966 (including a term as vice-mayor despite being one of the few Republicans), and then after selling his interest in the remaining drug stores, from 1970 until 1990 (during which he recruited Noel C. Taylor, a local pastor and activist who became Roanoke's first African American mayor, and the first African American mayor of a major Virginia city).

Despite his state senate defeat the previous year, in 1984, Ray Garland ran for Congress in Virginia's 6th district against Jim Olin, but lost. He then resumed working at the family's stores, as well as wrote a widely syndicated column during the 1990s.

== Legacy ==
Both Ray and Bob Garland participated in the Roanoke Library's oral history project, and news clips of both are available through the Library of Virginia.

Party political offices
Preceded by Lawrence M. Traylor	Republican nominee for U.S. Senator from Virginia (Class 1); 1970	Vacant Title next held by Paul Trible
