= Harvey B. Apperson =

American lawyer and politician

25th Attorney General of Virginia
- In office October 7, 1947 – February 2, 1948
- Appointed by: William M. Tuck
- Preceded by: Abram P. Staples
- Succeeded by: J. Lindsay Almond

Member of the Virginia State Corporation Commission
- In office January 31, 1944 – October 5, 1947
- Preceded by: William Meade Fletcher
- Succeeded by: W. Marshall King

Member of the Virginia Senate
- In office August 17, 1933 – January 31, 1944
- Preceded by: Robert J. Noell
- Succeeded by: Ted Dalton
- Constituency: 22nd district (1933‍–‍1936); 21st district (1936‍–‍1944)

Personal details
- Born: Harvey Black Apperson; June 27, 1890 Marion, Virginia, U.S.
- Died: February 2, 1948 (aged 57) Richmond, Virginia, U.S.
- Party: Democratic
- Spouse: Louise Logan
- Education: Virginia Polytechnic Institute; Washington & Lee University

Harvey Black Apperson (June 27, 1890 – February 2, 1948) was an American lawyer and politician who served as Attorney General of Virginia from 1947 until his death in 1948. Prior to this, he was a member of the Virginia State Corporation Commission and Senate of Virginia.

Legal offices
Preceded by Abram Penn Staples	Attorney General of Virginia; October 7, 1947 – February 2, 1948	Succeeded by J. Lindsay Almond
