= Thomas R. Glass =

American politician

Member of the Virginia House of Delegates from the Lynchburg, Virginia district
- In office January 8, 1958 – September 3, 1965
- Preceded by: Joseph E. Blackburn
- Succeeded by: William M. Dudley

Personal details
- Born: May 13, 1928 Lynchburg, Virginia, U.S.
- Died: August 25, 1998 (aged 70) Lynchburg, Virginia, U.S.
- Resting place: Spring Hill Cemetery
- Spouse: Julia Marguerite Thomason
- Education: Virginia Military Institute; Washington and Lee University
- Occupation: Publisher, politician

Military service
- Branch/service: United States Air Force
- Years of service: 1955-1957
- Rank: Lieutenant
- Unit: 18th Fighter Bomber Wing

Thomas Reakit Glass (May 13, 1928 – August 25, 1998) was a Virginia publisher who served from 1958 until 1965 in the Virginia House of Delegates representing the City of Lynchburg.

== Early and family life ==
Thomas Glass was born in 1928, the second son of Carter Glass Jr. and his wife Ria Glass. He had an elder brother (Carter Glass III) and two sisters. Their grandfather, U.S. Senator Carter Glass died in 1946 and their father died unexpectedly in 1955. Thomas Glass attended local schools (including E.C. Glass High School in Lynchburg), then the Virginia Military Institute and Lynchburg College before graduating from Washington and Lee University with B.A. in journalism.

During the Korean War, Glass served in the U.S. Air Force, as a first lieutenant with the 18th Fighter Bomber Wing.

He married Julia Marguerite Thomason, style editor of a Huntsville, Texas newspaper in 1951. They had four daughters during their 47-year marriage ended by his death. His wife was active in the Junior League, Daughters of the American Revolution, Daughters of the Republic of Texas, and Daughters of the Confederacy, as well as Lynchburg Garden Club and St. John's Episcopal Church.

== Career ==
Glass worked in the family business, Lynchburg's daily newspapers the News and Advance, later combined as The News & Advance. He started in marketing and public relations, and rose to publisher. During his tenure, the publishing group added local newspapers in Culpeper, Richlands, and Tazewell and continued publishing until 1979. After the deaths of his mother, uncles and aunt, tax and other issues led to competing offers by Gannett Newspapers and Howard newspapers as well as by a family group he led. The resulting litigation reached the Virginia Supreme Court, and led to their purchase by Worrell Newspapers Inc., which consolidated both Lynchburg newspapers into a single daily morning paper in 1986.

In 1958, upon Glass' return from his wartime service, Lynchurg voters elected him as a Democrat to the Virginia General Assembly. He succeeded Joseph E. Blackburn and became that body's youngest member. Earle M. Brown served alongside him in the legislature, representing other sections of Lynchburg, as well as Amherst County. Del. Glass (like Del. Brown) won re-election three times, and served (part-time) in the House of Delegates until resigning in 1965, basically as Massive Resistance collapsed. When house districts became numbered, his district was the 44th in 1962 and 1963, then became 43rd after the reorganization necessitated by the U.S. Supreme Court decision in Davis v. Mann. Glass then served for more than a decade on the State Highway Commission, as well as a member of the State Commission on Public Education.

Glass was active in numerous civic associations, including the Elks, Oddfellows Masons and Shriners. He also served on numerous civic and professional boards, including the Junior Chamber of Commerce, Salvation Army, Retail Merchants Association, American Red Cross chapter, Lynchburg National Bank and Trust Company and the Lynchburg Chamber of Commerce (second vice president) In 1956, he received Lynchburg's Distinguished Service Award.

== Death and legacy ==
Glass died on August 25, 1998.

The Virginia General Assembly passed a resolution honoring his service in 1999. The News & Advance is still published daily, although Worrell Newspapers Inc. sold it to Media General which in 2012 sold its newspaper division to Berkshire Hathaway.
