= List of Lambda Iota Tau chapters =

Lambda Iota Tau was an international honor society for literature. It was founded at Michigan State University in 1953 and operated until it merged into Sigma Tau Delta in 2016. Following is an incomplete list Lambda Iota Tau chapters, with inactive chapters and institutions indicated in italics.

Chapter	Charter date and range	Institution	Location	Status	Ref.
Alpha	December 3, 1953	Michigan State University	East Lansing, Michigan	Inactive	
Beta	1954	Aquinas College	Grand Rapids, Michigan	Merged (ΣΤΔ)	
Gamma	March 15, 1954	University of Sioux Falls	Sioux Falls, South Dakota	Inactive	
Delta (Second ?)	1964	Webber International University	Babson Park, Florida	Inactive	
Epsilon (First) (see Gamma Lambda)	March 25, 1954 – 19xx ?	Purdue University	West Lafayette, Indiana	Reassigned, Reestablished	
Epsilon (Second)	1964	University of South Dakota	Vermillion, South Dakota	Inactive, Reassigned	
Epsilon (Third)		Brenau University	Gainesville, Georgia	Merged (ΣΤΔ)	
	1954	Eastern Michigan University	Ypsilanti, Michigan	Inactive	
	1954	University of Detroit	Detroit, Michigan	Inactive	(Note: Chapter formed at Mercy College of Detroit, which became the University of Detroit in 1990.)
Zeta (Second ?)	1968	Kentucky Wesleyan College	Owensboro, Kentucky	Inactive	
Eta (Second ?)	1968	University of Mary Washington	Fredericksburg, Virginia	Merged (ΣΤΔ)	
Theta (Second ?)	1968	Annhurst College	South Woodstock, Connecticut	Inactive	(Note: The college closed in 1980.)
Iota (First)	1954	Marygrove College	Detroit, Michigan	Inactive, Reassigned	
Iota (Second)	1965	Morehead State University	Morehead, Kentucky	Inactive	
Lambda	1954	Siena Heights University	Adrian, Michigan	Merged (ΣΤΔ)	
Mu	May 1954	Alma College	Alma, Michigan	Inactive	
Nu	1954–19xx ?	Nazareth College	Kalamazoo, Michigan	Inactive	(Note: The college closed in 1992.)
Xi	1960	Madonna University	Livonia, Michigan	Inactive	
Omicron	October 23, 1954	Augsburg College	Minneapolis, Minnesota	Inactive	
Pi	1955	Wheaton College	Wheaton, Illinois	Inactive	
Rho (Second ?)	1964	Tokyo Kyoiku University	Tokyo, Japan	Inactive	
Sigma (Second ?)	1968	Chicago State University	Chicago, Illinois	Inactive	
Tau	February 1955	Anna Maria College	Paxton, Massachusetts	Merged (ΣΤΔ)	
Upsilon	195x ?	Mount Saint Mary's University, Los Angeles	Los Angeles, California	Merged (ΣΤΔ)	
Phi (First)	195x ?	Murray State University	Murray, Kentucky	Inactive	
Phi (Second)	1977	University of Pikeville	Pikeville, Kentucky	Inactive	
Chi	1955	College of St. Scholastica	Duluth, Minnesota	Inactive	
Psi (Second ?)	1965	Barry University	Miami Shores, Florida	Inactive	
Omega	1954	Baldwin Wallace University	Berea, Ohio	Inactive	
Alpha Alpha	195x ?	Adrian College	Adrian, Michigan	Merged (ΣΤΔ)	
Alpha Beta	1967	Hillsdale College	Hillsdale, Michigan	Merged (ΣΤΔ)	
Alpha Gamma (see Beta Rho)	1965–196x ?	Rosary Hill College	Amherst, New York	Reestablished	
Alpha Delta	195x ?	University of Southern Mississippi	Hattiesburg, Mississippi	Inactive	
Alpha Epsilon	1959	Holy Family University	Philadelphia, Pennsylvania	Merged (ΣΤΔ)	
Alpha Zeta	1956	Fort Hays State University	Hays, Kansas	Inactive	
Alpha Eta	1969	University of St. Francis	Joliet, Illinois	Inactive	
Alpha Theta	1956	Morgan State University	Baltimore, Maryland	Merged (ΣΤΔ)	
Alpha Iota	1954	West Virginia State University	Institute, West Virginia	Merged (ΣΤΔ)	
Alpha Kappa	1969	Carroll University	Waukesha, Wisconsin	Inactive	
Alpha Lambda	1966	Arkansas State University	Jonesboro, Arkansas	Inactive	
Alpha Nu	December 1969	Centenary College of Louisiana	Shreveport, Louisiana	Inactive	
Alpha Xi	1955	Lambuth College	Jackson, Tennessee	Inactive	(Note: Chapter formed from The Literary Forum, established in 1933.)
Alpha Omicron	1961	Southern Illinois University	Carbondale, Illinois	Inactive	
Alpha Pi	1956	John Carroll University	University Heights, Ohio	Merged (ΣΤΔ)	
Alpha Rho	1957	Mount St. Mary's University	Emmitsburg, Maryland	Merged (ΣΤΔ)	
Alpha Sigma	1957	Gordon College	Wenham, Massachusetts	Inactive	
Alpha Tau	1957	Immaculata University	Immaculata, Pennsylvania	Merged (ΣΤΔ)	
Alpha Upsilon	1957	Marian University	Indianapolis, Indiana	Merged (ΣΤΔ)	
Alpha Phi	1964	Kansas Wesleyan University	Salina, Kansas	Inactive	
Alpha Chi	19xx ?	Alumni Chapter		Inactive	
Alpha Psi	1964	Geneva College	Beaver Falls, Pennsylvania	Merged (ΣΤΔ)	
Alpha Omega	1964	Florida Memorial University	Miami Gardens, Florida	Inactive	
Beta Alpha	1966	College of Saint Teresa	Winona, Minnesota	Inactive	(Note: College closed in 1989.)
Beta Beta	1967	Tuskegee University	Tuskegee, Alabama	Merged (ΣΤΔ)	
Beta Gamma	1969	Carlow University	Pittsburgh, Pennsylvania	Inactive	
Beta Delta	1958	Florida A&M University	Tallahassee, Florida	Merged (ΣΤΔ)	
Beta Epsilon	1958	Misericordia University	Dallas, Pennsylvania	Merged (ΣΤΔ)	
Beta Zeta	1958	La Salle University	Philadelphia, Pennsylvania	Merged (ΣΤΔ)	
Beta Eta (First)	1961	Ladycliff College	Highland Falls, New York	Inactive, Reassigned	(Note: The college closed in 1980.)
Beta Eta (Second)	19xx ?	Elmira College	Elmira, New York	Merged (ΣΤΔ)	
Beta Theta	1969	Seattle Pacific University	Seattle, Washington	Inactive	
Beta Iota	1965	Grove City College	Grove City, Pennsylvania	Merged (ΣΤΔ)	
Beta Kappa	1964	Shinshu University	Matsumoto, Nagano, Japan	Inactive	
Beta Lambda	1964	Marywood University	Scranton, Pennsylvania	Merged (ΣΤΔ)	
Beta Mu	1956–1960; xxxx ?	Colorado State University	Fort Collins, Colorado	Merged (ΣΤΔ)	
Beta Nu	1970	Bethany College	Lindsborg, Kansas	Merged (ΣΤΔ)	
Beta Omicron	1970	Wisconsin State College of Milwaukee	Milwaukee, Wisconsin	Inactive	
Beta Pi	1970	Columbus State University	Columbus, Georgia	Inactive	
Beta Rho (see Alpha Gamma°	1968	Daemen College	Amherst, New York	Merged (ΣΤΔ)	(Note: This re-established the Rosary Hill College chapter. The college changed its name to Daemen College in 1976)
Beta Sigma	1966	Cabrini University	Radnor Township, Pennsylvania	Merged (ΣΤΔ)	
Beta Tau	1965	Aichi University	Aichi Prefecture, Japan	Inactive	
Beta Phi	1966–c. 1974	Dominican College of Racine	Racine, Wisconsin	Inactive	(Note: The college closed in 1974.)
Beta Chi	1966	University of Illinois	Champaign–Urbana, Illinois	Inactive	
Beta Psi	December 1967	Utah State University	Logan, Utah	Inactive	
Gamma Alpha	1966	Grambling State University	Grambling, Louisiana	Inactive	
Gamma Beta	1966	Knoxville College	Knoxville, Tennessee	Inactive	
Gamma Gamma	1967	William Carey College	Hattiesburg, Mississippi	Inactive	
Gamma Delta	1970	Loras College	Dubuque, Iowa	Inactive	
Gamma Epsilon	1966–19xx ?; 1981–2016	Massachusetts College of Liberal Arts	North Adams, Massachusetts	Merged (ΣΤΔ)	
Gamma Zeta	1971	Dickinson State University	Dickinson, North Dakota	Inactive	
Gamma Eta	1971	Westfield State University	Westfield, Massachusetts	Merged (ΣΤΔ)	
Gamma Theta	1970	Georgia State University	Atlanta, Georgia	Inactive	
Gamma Iota	1967	Moravian University	Bethlehem, Pennsylvania	Inactive	
Gamma Kappa	1971	Tsuda University	Kodaira, Tokyo, Japan	Inactive	
Gamma Lambda (see Epsilon)	19xx ?	Purdue University	West Lafayette, Indiana	Inactive	
Gamma Mu	1971	University of Florida	Gainesville, Florida	Inactive	
Gamma Nu	1971	University of Evansville	Evansville, Indiana	Inactive	
Gamma Xi	1971	Hope College	Holland, Michigan	Inactive	
Gamma Omicron	19xx ?	Presbyterian College	Clinton, South Carolina	Merged (ΣΤΔ)	
Gamma Pi	1972	Molloy College	Rockville Centre, New York	Merged (ΣΤΔ)	
Gamma Rho	1972	Ball State University	Muncie, Indiana	Merged (ΣΤΔ)	
Gamma Sigma	1972	Marian University	Indianapolis, Indiana	Inactive	
Gamma Tau	1972	Florida State University	Tallahassee, Florida	Merged (ΣΤΔ)	
Gamma Upsilon	1972	Bethany College	Bethany, West Virginia	Merged (ΣΤΔ)	
Gamma Phi	1972	University of Alabama	Tuscaloosa, Alabama	Inactive	
Gamma Chi	1973	Fisk University	Nashville, Tennessee	Merged (ΣΤΔ)	
Gamma Psi	1973	University of Tennessee	Knoxville, Tennessee	Inactive	
Gamma Omega	1973	Maryville College	Maryville, Tennessee	Inactive	
Delta Alpha	1973	Texas Southern University	Houston, Texas	Merged (ΣΤΔ)	
Delta Beta	1973	Towson University	Towson, Maryland	Merged (ΣΤΔ)	
Delta Gamma	1973	Western Carolina University	Cullowhee, North Carolina	Inactive	
Delta Delta	1974	Dillard University	New Orleans, Louisiana	Inactive	
Delta Zeta	1974	St. Cloud State University	St. Cloud, Minnesota	Inactive	
Delta Eta	1974	Shepherd University	Shepherdstown, West Virginia	Inactive	
Delta Theta	1974	Worcester State University	Worcester, Massachusetts	Merged (ΣΤΔ)	
Delta Iota	1974	Delta State University	Cleveland, Mississippi	Inactive	
Delta Kappa	1975	North Central College	Naperville, Illinois	Inactive	
Delta Lambda	1975	University of Utah	Salt Lake City, Utah	Inactive	
Delta Mu	1975	Montana State University	Bozeman, Montana	Inactive	
Delta Xi		Coppin State University	Baltimore, Maryland	Merged (ΣΤΔ)	
Delta Omicron		McDaniel College	Westminster, Maryland	Merged (ΣΤΔ)	
Delta Phi		Wesley College	Dover, Delaware	Merged (ΣΤΔ)	
Delta Chi		Gwynedd Mercy University	Gwynedd Valley, Pennsylvania	Merged (ΣΤΔ)	
Delta Psi		Salisbury University	Salisbury, Maryland	Merged (ΣΤΔ)	
Epsilon Alpha		Newman University	Wichita, Kansas	Merged (ΣΤΔ)	
Epsilon Zeta		Southern University and A&M College	Baton Rouge, Louisiana	Merged (ΣΤΔ)	
Epsilon Xi		Northwestern Oklahoma State University	Enid, Oklahoma	Merged (ΣΤΔ)	
Eta Alpha		Seattle University	Seattle, Washington	Merged (ΣΤΔ)	
Eta Theta	1966	Longwood University	Farmville, Virginia	Merged (ΣΤΔ)	
