= William S. Brewbaker III =

American legal scholar (born 1959)

William S. Brewbaker III (born 1959) is an American legal scholar.

Brewbaker earned a bachelor's degree from Vanderbilt University, and subsequently obtained a Juris Doctor from University of Virginia School of Law, followed by a Master of Laws at Duke University School of Law. He practiced law in his hometown of Birmingham, Alabama, from 1988 to 1992, and joined the University of Alabama School of Law faculty in 1993, after graduating from Duke. Prior to his appointment as dean of UA Law in May 2023, Brewbaker was the William Alfred Rose Professor of Law. He had previously served as interim dean between the tenures of Ken Randall and Mark E. Brandon.

Brewbaker is an elected member of the American Law Institute.
