= Mark E. Brandon =

American lawyer and academic

- Born: Mark Edward Brandon; Georgia, United States
- Education: University of Montevallo; University of Alabama School of Law; University of Michigan; Princeton University
- Occupations: Lawyer, academic
- Employer: University of Alabama School of Law

Mark Edward Brandon is an American lawyer and academic. He is the dean of the University of Alabama School of Law.

== Early life ==
Mark E. Brandon was born in Georgia and grew up in Birmingham, Alabama. He graduated from the University of Montevallo. He earned a JD from the University of Alabama School of Law, followed by a master's degree from the University of Michigan and a PhD from Princeton University.

== Career ==
Brandon was "an assistant attorney general for Alabama from 1978-1980, a staff attorney and consumer unit coordinator for Legal Services Corp. and has worked with private firms in Alabama and Michigan."

Brandon taught political science at the University of Michigan and the University of Oklahoma. He was a professor of Law and Political Science at the Vanderbilt University Law School until July 1, 2014, when he succeeded Ken Randall and interim dean William S. Brewbaker III as the dean of the University of Alabama School of Law.

Brandon is the author of two books.

== Selected works ==
- Brandon, Mark E. (1998). Free in the World: American Slavery and Constitutional Failure. Princeton, New Jersey: Princeton University Press. ISBN 9780691015811. OCLC 260098271. ProQuest 9216795.
- Brandon, Mark E. (2013). States of Union: Family and Change in the American Constitutional Order. Lawrence, Kansas: University Press of Kansas. ISBN 9780700619238. OCLC 864561870.
