= Herbert Gregory =

Herbert Gregory may refer to:

- Herbert B. Gregory (1884–1951), Virginia judge
- Herbert E. Gregory, American geologist and geographer
