= Robert S. Burruss Jr. =

State Senator and businessman from Lynchburg, Virginia

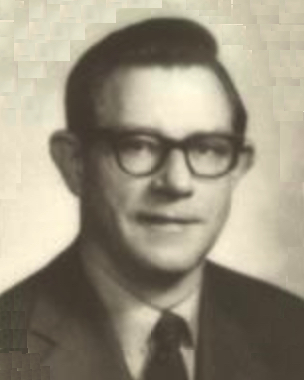

Member of the Virginia Senate
- In office January 8, 1964 – January 14, 1976
- Preceded by: Mosby Perrow Jr.
- Succeeded by: Elliot Schewel
- Constituency: 12th district (1964–1966); 10th district (1966–1972); 23rd district (1972–1976)

Personal details
- Born: Robert Sidney Burruss Jr. November 9, 1914 Lynchburg, Virginia, U.S.
- Died: June 21, 1978 (aged 63) Lynchburg, Virginia, U.S.
- Party: Republican
- Spouse: Margaret Hanna Brooks (m. 1947)
- Education: Virginia Tech (BS)
- Occupation: Businessman; politician

Military service
- Branch/service: United States Army; Army Service Forces; Corps of Engineers
- Years of service: 1941–1945
- Rank: Lieutenant colonel
- Battles/wars: World War II; European theater

Robert Sidney Burruss Jr. (November 9, 1914 – June 21, 1978) was a state Senator and businessman from Lynchburg, Virginia. In 1963 he became the first Republican elected to represent the area since Congressional Reconstruction.

== Early and family life ==
Born in Lynchburg, Virginia to R.S. Burruss and his wife, Ada Steptoe Moorman, Buruss attended the public schools, including E.C. Glass High School. He then attended Virginia Polytechnic Institute in Blacksburg, Virginia, graduating with a B.S. in Industrial Engineering.

During World War II, Burruss served in the United States Army Corps of Engineers, mostly in the European Theater, for five years from 1940 to 1945. He was discharged with the rank of lieutenant colonel.

He married Margaret Hanna "Peggy" Brooks on May 24, 1947, and they had children Rebecca Moorman Burruss (b. 1948), James Robert Burruss (b. 1950), Hanna Brooks Burruss (b. 1953) and Mary Scott Burruss (b. 1957).

== Career ==
Burruss together with his uncle, William H. Burruss, owned and operated Burruss Land and Lumber Company. In 1953, they decided to dissolve their partnership which included splitting up the timberlands and sawmills. Afterwards, Robert Burruss opened his own company, the R.S. Burruss Lumber Company, and he owned Ralco Stores, Inc. He also served as director of the Royal Crown Bottling Company of Lynchburg, the Lynchburg branch of the First and Merchants National Bank, and the Lumber Manufacturers Association of Virginia (also once as president).

== Political career ==
Democrat and lawyer Mosby Perrow Jr. represented Lynchburg (part-time) for two decades in the Virginia state Senate. However, desegregation following the U.S. Supreme Court decisions in Brown v. Board of Education was very controversial, as Virginia's Democratic U.S. Senator Harry F. Byrd and his Byrd Organization called for Massive Resistance, and successive Virginia governors even shut down schools rather than permit them to desegregate. After Governor J. Lindsay Almond split with the Byrd Organization and agreed to reopen schools after decisions by the Virginia Supreme Court and a 3-judge federal district court panel on January 19, 1959, the Perrow Commission was formed to transition. In the next Democratic primary election, however Perrow faced opposition, and lost his bid for re-election to fellow Democrat Bert F. Dodson. However, Republican Burruss narrowly defeated Dodson in the general election (6904 votes to 6694), and so succeeded Perrow to what was then the 12th senatorial district seat in 1964.

His father (R.S. Burruss Sr.) had served as an alternate delegate to the 1932 Republican National Convention, and this Burruss became a delegate from Virginia to the 1964 Republican National Convention.

After redistricting following the Civil Rights Act of 1964 and the U.S. Supreme Court decision in Davis v. Mann, Lynchburg was no longer combined with Campbell County, but with Amherst County as senate District 10. Buruss, however, won re-election. After the 1970 census, redistricting added Bedford County and the city of Bedford, and renumbered the district as the 23rd. Burruss again won re-election until 1975 (rising to minority leader). He retired at the end of his term to spend more time with his family and business. He was succeeded by Democrat Elliot S. Schewel in 1976.

== Death ==
Burruss died in Lynchburg, Virginia on June 21, 1978.

Senate of Virginia
Preceded by Mosby Perrow Jr.	Virginia Senator for Lynchburg District; 1964–1975	Succeeded by Elliot Schewel
