= Henry N. Butler =

American economist and legal scholar

Dean of the Antonin Scalia Law School
- In office June 25, 2015 – December 1, 2020
- Preceded by: Daniel D. Polsby
- Succeeded by: Ken Randall

Personal details
- Born: Henry Nolde Butler; February 16, 1954 (age 72) Roanoke, Virginia, U.S.
- Party: Republican
- Parent: M. Caldwell Butler (father)
- Education: University of Richmond (BA); Virginia Tech (MA, PhD); University of Miami (JD)
- Occupation: Professor of law; lawyer

Henry Nolde Butler (born February 16, 1954) is an American professor of law, economics, and public policy and former executive director of the Law and Economics Center at the Antonin Scalia Law School in Arlington, Virginia.

Butler formerly served as the director of the Judicial Education Program at the American Enterprise Institute-Brookings Institution Joint Center for Regulatory Studies. A conservative, he supports free markets with little regulation. He has acted as an expert witness in a legal cases involving antitrust, restrictive covenants, damages, joint ventures, and other issues.

Butler ran unsuccessfully as a Republican for the U.S. House of Representatives for Virginia's 11th congressional district in 1992; he lost the general election to Democrat Leslie L. Byrne.

== Early life and education ==
Butler is the son of M. Caldwell Butler, who served as a Republican U.S. Representative for Virginia's 6th congressional district from 1972 to 1983.

Butler received his Bachelor of Arts degree in economics from the University of Richmond in 1977. He then attended Virginia Tech, where he earned a Master of Arts in 1979 and a Ph.D. in 1982. There he studied under James M. Buchanan, a Nobel Economics Laureate.

Butler received a Juris Doctor from the University of Miami School of Law in 1982, where he was a John M. Olin Fellow in Law and Economics.

== Career ==
Butler has been involved in the political and legal spheres. While at George Mason University, he served as director of the Law and Economics Center at the George Mason University School of Law, which operates the Economics Institutes program for federal judges. In December 1995, Butler introduced the Economics Institute for State Judges at the University of Kansas' Law and Organizational Economics Center. Before assuming the GMU Law deanship in 2015, Butler was a George Mason University Foundation Professor of Law. In 2019, he became the inaugural Allison and Dorothy Rouse Dean of the Antonin Scalia Law School. After he yielded the deanship to Ken Randall, Butler assumed the Henry G. Manne Chair in Law and Economics.

Butler has written extensively on law and economics. He has written a casebook, Economic Analysis for Lawyers (with Christopher Drahozal, Carolina Academic Press), used at the Economics Institute for State Judges. Other books by Butler include Unhealthy Alliances: Bureaucrats, Interest Groups, and Politicians in Health (1994, American Entreprise Institute) The Corporation and the Constitution (with Larry E. Ribstein; 1995, American Entreprise Institute); and Using Federalism to Improve Environmental Policy (with Jonathan R. Macey; 1996, American Enterprise Institute).

Butler serves on the Legal Advisory Council of the AEI Legal Center for the Public Interest and the advisory board of the Atlantic Legal Foundation.
