= Willis M. Anderson =

American politician (1928–2002)

Member of the Virginia House of Delegates
- In office January 8, 1964 – January 12, 1972 Serving with M. Caldwell Butler
- Preceded by: Kossen Gregory
- Succeeded by: John C. Towler
- Constituency: 61st district (1964–1966); 57th district (1966–1972)

37th Mayor of Roanoke
- In office September 1, 1960 – August 31, 1962
- Preceded by: Vincent S. Wheeler
- Succeeded by: Murray A. Stoller

Personal details
- Born: Willis Martin Anderson; November 3, 1928 Jacksonville, Florida, U.S.
- Died: April 23, 2002 (aged 73) Salem, Virginia, U.S.
- Party: Democratic (until 1984); Republican (1984–2002)
- Education: Roanoke College; Washington and Lee University (LLB)
- Occupation: Lawyer; politician

Military service
- Branch/service: United States Army
- Years of service: 1952–1954

Willis Martin "Wick" Anderson (November 3, 1928 – April 23, 2002) was an American lawyer and politician.

He was elected to the Roanoke, Virginia city council as a Democrat in 1958 and, two years later, became the youngest mayor in the city's history. In 1963, he ran for the Roanoke City seat in the Virginia House of Delegates being vacated by Kossen Gregory, and he was elected alongside Republican incumbent M. Caldwell Butler. In August 1972, Richard H. Poff, member of the United States House of Representatives from Virginia's 6th congressional district, resigned after being appointed by Governor Linwood Holton to fill a vacancy on the Supreme Court of Virginia. Both Anderson and Butler decided to forgo reelection, instead seeking their respective parties' nominations to succeed Poff in Congress. Butler defeated Anderson in both the special election to complete Poff's unfinished term and the regular election to a full term. When Butler retired a decade later, Anderson again sought the seat but was bested at the party's nomination convention by Jim Olin. Anderson defected to the Republican Party in 1984 and later unsuccessfully ran for mayor against David A. Bowers.

Political offices
Preceded by Vincent S. Wheeler	Mayor of Roanoke; 1960–1962	Succeeded by Murray A. Stoller
Virginia House of Delegates
Preceded by Kossen Gregory	Member of the Virginia House of Delegates from Roanoke City; 1964–1972; Served alongside: M. Caldwell Butler	Succeeded by John C. Towler
Party political offices
Preceded by Roy R. White	Democratic nominee for U.S. House of Representatives from Virginia's 6th congressional district 1972 (special), 1972	Succeeded by Paul J. Puckett
Preceded by Noel C. Taylor	Republican nominee for Mayor of Roanoke; 1992	Succeeded by Pat Green
