= Senator Glass (disambiguation) =

Carter Glass (1858–1946) was a U.S. Senator from Virginia from 1920 to 1946.

Senator Glass may also refer to:

- Bradley M. Glass (1931–2015), Illinois State Senate
- Carter Glass Jr. (1893–1955), Virginia State Senate
- Franklin Potts Glass Sr. (1858–1934), U.S. Senator-Designate from Alabama
