= Perrow Commission =

The Commission on Education, known as the Perrow Commission after its chairman, Virginia state senator Mosby Perrow Jr., was a 40-member commission established by Governor of Virginia J. Lindsay Almond on February 5, 1959, after the Virginia Supreme Court in Harrison v. Day and a three-judge federal court in James v. Almond had both struck down significant portions of the Stanley Plan, which had implemented Massive Resistance to the U.S. Supreme Court decisions in Brown v. Board of Education issued on May 17, 1954, and May 31, 1955. Four legislators (some from the Virginia Senate, others from the House of Delegates) were appointed from each of the ten U.S. Congressional districts in Virginia. Compared to the Gray Commission that Governor Thomas B. Stanley had appointed five years previously, Perrow Commission included more representatives from cities, northern and Western Virginia, although many members served on both commissions.

== Hearings and report ==
Governor Almond instructed the Commission to prepare a report by the end of the legislative session on March 31, 1959.

Following extensive public hearings and debate, the Commission on March 31 issued a 74-page report: "The Commission is opposed to integration and offers the program set out herein because it thinks it is the best that can be devised at this time to avoid integration and preserve our public schools." It further described a "local option" plan that included new pupil placement laws, a new compulsory attendance law, and tuition grants that could be used at what came to be known as "segregation academies," similar to the former Gray plan that had never been adopted but superseded by the more radical and now-overturned Stanley Plan. Thus, members assured segregationists that it would preserve their values and predicted its passage.

== Criticism and aftermath ==
Many segregationists were appalled at the Commission's report for betraying the Massive Resistance movement. On the eve of the state Senate's vote on adopting the Perrow Commissions' recommendations, 5000 people (mostly from Southside Virginia) gathered in Richmond's Capital Square to condemn Governor Almond and Lieutenant Governor Stephens for supporting the Perrow Commission's recommendations, rather than fight on. Later, liberals would criticize it for replacing "Massive Resistance" with "Passive Resistance."

Former Perrow Commission member George M. Cochran later recalled how, after four hours of debate, the House approved the House bill reported from the Education Committee 54 to 45, leading to final passage 54 to 46. On the Senate side, an anti-Perrow Commission majority controlled the Senate Education Committee and so Almond's allies used a parliamentary device to permit the entire Senate, rather than just that small committee, to vote on the pupil assignment bill. To break a deadlocked Senate, however, supporters needed the tie-breaking vote of Senator Stuart B. Carter of Fincastle in Botetourt County, who had long argued against the school closings at the heart of Massive Resistance. Carter had opposed the tuition assistance aspects of the Gray plan and had recently had major surgery. Carter was wheeled into the Senate chambers on a stretcher to cast the decisive favorable vote. The bill passed 20 to 19. The following day, on the same 20 to 19 vote, the Senate approved the local pupil assignment bill.

The 1959 special session established a permanent fissure in the Byrd Organization, "embittering old friends toward one another." The Senate's passage of the "local option" helped trigger the seemingly-inevitable decline and fall of Massive Resistance, but Perrow paid a political price. He lost support within the Byrd Organization, which defeated his re-election plans in the 1963 Democratic primary. Governor Harrison later appointed Perrow as president of the Virginia State Board of Education.

Legal challenges to the remains of Massive Resistance continued, and in 1963, Virginia lost NAACP v. Button. The following year, the US Supreme Court overturned Prince Edward County's obstinacy in Griffin v. County School Board of Prince Edward County. Moreover, over Dixiecrat opposition and filibusters, US President Lyndon B. Johnson convinced the US Congress to enact civil rights legislation, including the Civil Rights Act of 1964, then the Voting Rights Act of 1965, which undercut the Byrd Organization's base. In April 1965, the Department of Health, Education and Welfare issued guidelines that required all school districts to file compliance documents by July. With increased funding as an incentive, all but 5 of Virginia's 130 school districts had filed desegregation plans and documentation concerning compliance by April 1965.

In Green v. County School Board of New Kent County, the Supreme Court heard arguments challenging the freedom-of-choice plan that the New Kent school board had enacted supposedly to desegregate the county schools on a voluntary basis and allowed white children to attend segregation academies at public expense. Arguing on behalf of the NAACP and representing black parents, Samuel W. Tucker used statistics to show that the county's plan was no more than segregation by another name 14 years after Brown. In May 1968, the Court agreed by finding the freedom-of-choice plan an inadequate remedy and ruling that school boards had an "affirmative duty" to desegregate their schools, not to place the burden upon black schoolchildren and their parents.

== Members of the Commission ==
As shown by the # symbols below, members of the Perrow Commission significantly overlapped with those of the Gray Commission but also included more representatives from cities and northern and western Virginia. Southside Virginia had been overrepresented in the Gray Commission.

- Mosby G. Perrow Jr. of Lynchburg(12th Senatorial District), Chairman
- Harry B. Davis of Norfolk, vice-chairman#

First Congressional District

- Howard H. Adams of Eastville representing Accomack and Northampton counties#
- Harry B. Davis of Norfolk (vice-chairman)#
- Russell M. Carneal of Williamsburg representing Charles City, James City, New Kent and York Counties and Williamsburg#
- W. Marvin Minter of Mathews (31st Senatorial District)#

Second Congressional District

- Edward L. Breeden Jr. of Norfolk (2d Senatorial District)
- Wilbur T. Leary of Portsmouth, representing Norfolk County and South Norfolk
- Willard J. Moody of Portsmouth
- James W. Roberts of Norfolk#

Third Congressional District

- FitzGerald Bemiss of Richmond (34th Senatorial District)
- Fred G. Pollard of Richmond
- Edward E. Willey of Richmond (34th Senatorial District)
- Joseph J. Williams Jr. of Richmond

Fourth Congressional District

- Garland Gray of Waverly (6th Senatorial District)#
- John H. Daniel of Charlotte Court House, representing Charlotte and Prince Edward Counties#
- Mills E. Godwin Jr. of Suffolk (5th Senatorial District)#
- Joseph C. Hutcheson of Lawrenceville (7th Senatorial District)

Fifth Congressional District

- James D. Hagood of Clover (4th Senatorial District)#
- S. Floyd Landreth of Galax (14th Senatorial District) (one of 2 Republicans)#
- Chase S. Wheatley Jr. of Danville#
- Hunt M. Whitehead of Chatham

Sixth Congressional District

- Earl A. Fitzpatrick of Roanoke (35th Senatorial District)#
- Kossen Gregory of Roanoke
- Mosby G. Perrow Jr. of Lynchburg (12th Senatorial District)
- H. Ray Webber of Low Moor, representing Alleghany County, Covington and Clifton Forge

Seventh Congressional District

- Curry Carter of Staunton (22nd Senatorial District)#
- George M. Cochran of Staunton, representing Augusta and Highland Counties and Staunton and Waynesboro
- Lawrence H. Hoover of Harrisonburg, representing Rockingham County and Harrisonburg
- Robert Whitehead of Lovingston, representing Nelson and Amherst Counties

Eighth Congressional District

- Robert Y. Button of Culpeper (27th Senatorial District)#
- Robert R. Gwathmey III of Hanover
- Edward O. McCue Jr. of Charlottesville (25th Senatorial District)
- W. Tayloe Murphy of Warsaw, representing Northumberland, Westmoreland, Lancaster and Richmond counties#

Ninth Congressional District

- Macon M. Long of St. Paul (17th Senatorial District)
- Garnett S. Moore of Pulaski
- Vernon C. Smith of Grundy, representing Buchanan County
- Harry C. Stuart of Elk Garden (18th Senatorial District)

Tenth Congressional District

- Charles R. Fenwick of Arlington (9th Senatorial District)#
- John A. K. Donovan of Falls Church (28th Senatorial District)
- C. Harrison Mann of Arlington
- James M. Thomson of Alexandria

Members of Gray Commission not on Perrow Commission

- J. Bradie Allman of Rocky Mount representing Franklin County (retired)
- Robert F. Baldwin Jr. of Norfolk (2nd Senatorial District)
- Joseph E. Blackburn of Lynchburg (retired)
- Orby L. Cantrell of Pound, representing Wise and Norton counties
- Walter C. Caudill of Pearisburg (19th Senatorial District)(retired)
- Charles W. Cleaton of South Hill, representing Mecklenburg County
- Albertis S. Harrison Jr. of Lawrenceville (elected attorney general)
- Charles K. Hutchens of Newport News
- Baldwin G. Locher of Lexington, representing Rockbridge, Bath and Buena Vista counties
- J. Maynard Magruder of Arlington (retired)
- G. Edmond Massie of Richmond (35th Senatorial District)(defeated)
- Samuel E. Pope of Drewryville, representing Southampton County
- Harold H. Purcell of Louisa (27th Senatorial District)
- Vernon S. Shaffer of Maurertown (deceased)
- W. Roy Smith of Petersburg, representing Petersburg and Dinwiddie County
- J. Randolph Tucker, Jr. of Richmond (retired)

== See also ==
- Sibley Commission
