= M. Caldwell Butler =

American politician (1925–2014)

Caldwell Butler
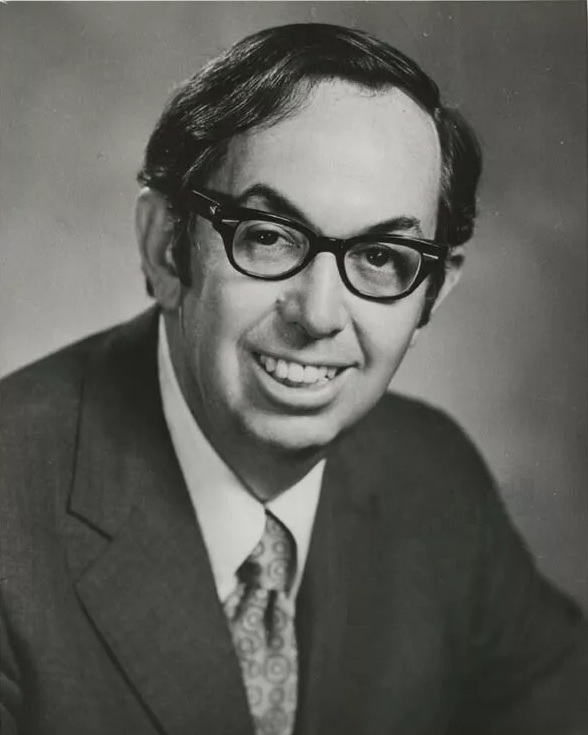
- Official portrait, c. 1972

Member of the U.S. House of Representatives from Virginia's 6th district
- In office November 7, 1972 – January 3, 1983
- Preceded by: Dick Poff
- Succeeded by: Jim Olin

Minority Leader of the Virginia House of Delegates
- In office January 1966 – January 12, 1972
- Succeeded by: Pete Giesen

Member of the Virginia House of Delegates
- In office January 10, 1962 – January 12, 1972 Serving with Kossen Gregory (1962–1964); Willis M. Anderson (1964–1972)
- Preceded by: Julian Rutherfoord
- Succeeded by: Ray L. Garland
- Constituency: 62nd district (1962–1964); 61st district (1964–1966); 57th district (1966–1972)

Personal details
- Born: Manley Caldwell Butler; June 2, 1925 Roanoke, Virginia, U.S.
- Died: July 28, 2014 (aged 89) Roanoke, Virginia, U.S.
- Party: Republican
- Spouse: June Parker Nolde
- Children: 4, including Henry
- Relatives: John Marshall (great-great-great-grandfather); Thomas Marshall (great-great-grandfather); James A. Walker (great-grandfather)
- Education: University of Richmond (BA); University of Virginia (LLB)

Military service
- Branch/service: United States Navy
- Years of service: 1943–1946
- Rank: Ensign
- Battles/wars: World War II

Manley Caldwell Butler (June 2, 1925 – July 28, 2014) was an American lawyer and politician widely admired for his integrity, bipartisanship and courage. A native of Roanoke, Butler served his hometown and wider community first as a member of the Republican Party in the Virginia General Assembly (1962–1972) and later the United States House of Representatives (1972–1983).

== Early and family life ==
Born in Roanoke, Virginia, to William Wilson Samuel Butler and the former Sarah Poage Caldwell, Butler attended public schools. He was an Eagle Scout and graduated from Jefferson Senior High School in 1942. He then began undergraduate studies in Richmond as well as joined the Reserve Officers Training Corps (ROTC). After training at Columbia University, Butler was commissioned an ensign in the United States Navy, assigned to command a rescue boat in Rhode Island. Upon his discharge in 1946, Butler completed his undergraduate degree at the University of Richmond in 1948. He went to Charlottesville to attend the University of Virginia Law School and graduated with an LLB degree in 1950. He was a member of Phi Beta Kappa, the Order of the Coif, and the Raven Society.

He married June Parker Nolde of Richmond, and in their 64 years of marriage they raised four sons: Manley, Henry, Jimmy, and Marshall. Butler was a lifelong member of St. John's Episcopal Church in Roanoke and served on its vestry. He was descended from Chief Justice John Marshall and became a member of the John Marshall Foundation. His great-grandfather James A. Walker was also a Virginia lawyer and politician, and a Confederate general during the American Civil War.

== Career ==
Butler was admitted to the Virginia bar in 1950 and began a private legal practice in Roanoke.

Butler's first political campaign was for Roanoke City Council in 1958, and he lost. However, in 1961, Butler became the first Republican to represent Roanoke in the Virginia House of Delegates since 1901. In the widespread upset over closing of Virginia's public schools because of U.S. Senator Harry F. Byrd's vow of Massive Resistance to the U.S. Supreme Court decisions in Brown v. Board of Education, Butler defeated veteran Byrd Organization Democrat Julian H. Rutherfoord Jr., who had served since 1948.

Butler represented Roanoke in the House of Delegates (a part-time position) from 1962 to 1971. He fought corruption, such as a local highway commissioner with a conflict of interest, and revitalized a two-party system as the Byrd Organization crumbled. Butler became involved in redistricting controversies, necessitated by censuses, as well the Supreme Court decision in Davis v. Mann and federal civil rights legislation.

He later called helping to revitalize a two-party system in Virginia "the greatest thrill of my life." Butler served as chairman of the joint Republican caucus from 1964 to 1966, and as minority leader from 1966 to 1971. In representing Roanoke in the House of Delegates, Butler served alongside Democrat Kossen Gregory until 1963, then Democrat Willis M. Anderson. In the 1971 elections Ray L. Garland and John C. Towler replaced Anderson and Butler. In 1970, his law partner Linwood Holton was elected Governor of Virginia. Holton later recalled Butler's ability to make alliances, as well as his ability to concentrate on specific issues.

When United States Representative Richard H. Poff, a fellow Republican, resigned, Butler won the Republican nomination to fill the ensuing vacancy in the Roanoke-based 6th District. He ran in two elections on Election Day—a special election for the balance of Poff's 10th term, and a regular election for a full two-year term—winning both. He initially supported President Richard M. Nixon, crediting his own victory to the coattails of Nixon's landslide in the 1972 elections. However, as the Watergate tapes revealed dirty tricks and chicanery at the White House, Butler joined six other Republicans and three conservative Southern Democrats—known among themselves as "the unholy alliance"—in questioning Nixon's conduct. The freshman representative drew national attention on July 25, 1974, when he announced his support for impeachment. He noted that for Republicans who had long campaigned against dishonest and criminal conduct in government, "Watergate is our shame." Two days later, the Judiciary Committee voted to refer three articles of impeachment to the full House, with Butler voting for two of them. Nixon resigned the presidency the following month.

Despite his mother's warnings about endangering his political career, Butler never questioned the appropriateness of his vote, though fellow Republicans may have disciplined him with unfavorable committee assignments. Those who knew Butler said that he was "free of politics" and acted more like a judge.

Voters appeared to appreciate Butler's courage in 1974. While many of his Republican colleagues went down in defeat due to voter anger over Watergate, Butler himself defeated his Democratic challenger by 18 points, albeit falling short of a majority. It would be the last time he would face major-party opposition in an election; he only faced an independent in 1976 and was completely unopposed in 1978 and 1980. Besides the Watergate hearings, he also participated in the hearings for vice-presidents Gerald R. Ford and Nelson Rockefeller, and in the creation of the Legal Services Corporation. He was the main author of the Bankruptcy Reform Act of 1978. In 1982, he chose not to seek re-election but instead resumed practicing law in Roanoke the following year with Woods, Rogers & Hazelgrove although he also served on the National Bankruptcy Review Commission in 1995–1997.

== Death and legacy ==
Butler died on July 28, 2014, at the age of 89. His wife June predeceased him the previous month; their four sons and numerous grandchildren survived them. In 2002, Roanoke's main post office was renamed in his honor.

His papers are now at the Washington and Lee University School of Law. Bob Goodlatte, once a member of his staff, represented the Sixth Congressional District from 1993 through 2019. His former press secretary, Richard Cullen, later went to law school and was appointed U.S. Attorney for the Eastern District of Virginia (serving from 1991 to 1993) and later Attorney General of Virginia (filling an unexpired term, 1997–1998).

== Elections ==
- 1972; Butler was elected to the U.S. House of Representatives in a special election with 51.76% of the vote, defeating Democrat Willis M. Anderson and Independent Roy R. White. He was simultaneously elected to a full term in the general election with 54.62% of the vote, defeating Democrat Anderson and Independent White.
- 1974; Butler was re-elected with 45.15% of the vote, defeating Democrat Paul J. Puckett and Independents Warren D. Saunders and Timothy A. McGay.
- 1976; Butler was re-elected with 62.24% of the vote, defeating Independent Saunders.
- 1978; Butler was re-elected unopposed.
- 1980; Butler was re-elected unopposed.

U.S. House of Representatives
| Preceded by Dick Poff | Member of the U.S. House of Representatives from Virginia's 6th congressional district 1972–1983 | Succeeded by Jim Olin |
