= Carter Glass Jr. =

American politician

Carter Glass, Jr.

Member of the Virginia Senate from the Lynchburg, Virginia district
- In office January 14, 1942 – January 11, 1944
- Preceded by: Charles E. Burks
- Succeeded by: Mosby Perrow Jr.

Personal details
- Born: March 29, 1893 Lynchburg, Virginia, U.S.
- Died: December 1, 1955 (aged 62) Lynchburg, Virginia, U.S.
- Party: Democratic
- Spouse: Maria Binford Thomas
- Children: 3, including Thomas
- Parent: Carter Glass (father)
- Occupation: publisher

George Carter Glass Jr. (March 29, 1893 – December 1, 1955), was a Virginia publisher and politician. He represented Lynchburg and Campbell County in the Virginia Senate for one term.

== Early and family life ==
Carter Glass Jr. was born to newspaper publisher Carter Glass and his wife Aurelia (Ria) Caldwell McDearmon Glass (1859-1937) on March 29, 1893. His father became a Virginia state senator in 1898, and later a U.S. Congressman and U.S. Senator. One of two brothers, Carter Glass Jr. attended Washington and Lee University, from which he received an A.B. degree, and then Virginia Polytechnic University. He was commissioned a second lieutenant of infantry in World War I and reported to Fort Myer, Virginia on June 5, 1917.

He married Maria Binford Thomas (1896-1979), and they had three children: sons Carter Glass III (b. 1919) and Thomas R. Glass (b. 1929), and daughter Aurelia Glass (b. 1935).

== Career ==
He and his brother Powell Glass succeeded their father as publishers of two Lynchburg newspapers, The News (a morning paper) and The Daily Advance (an afternoon paper). Carter Glass, Jr. would in turn be succeeded by his son Thomas R. Glass.

Several years before his father's death, Carter Glass Jr. briefly entered politics, serving in the Virginia Senate (a part-time position) for two years during World War II. His successor Mosby Perrow Jr. would represent Lynchburg for more than two decades, including through the Massive Resistance crisis.

== Death ==
On December 1, 1955, Glass suffered a stroke and died shortly thereafter.

His son Thomas R. Glass continued publishing The News and The Daily Advance until 1979, when he sold them to Worrell Newspapers Inc. Worrell consolidated the papers into a single daily morning paper in 1986; this paper is now known as The News & Advance. Eventually Worrell sold it to Media General. In 2012, Media General sold its newspaper division to Berkshire Hathaway, which continues to publish The News & Advance.
