= Aimee Parkison =

American writer

- Born: Oklahoma, U.S.
- Education: Oklahoma State University–Stillwater (BA); Cornell University (MFA)
- Occupation: Writer
- Writing career
- Genre: Fiction
- Website: www.aimeeparkison.com

Aimee Parkison is an American writer known for experimental, lyrical, feminist fiction. She has won the FC2 Catherine Doctorow Innovative Fiction Prize as well as the first annual Starcherone Fiction Prize and has taught creative writing at a number of universities, including Cornell University, the University of North Carolina at Charlotte, and Oklahoma State University.

== Biography ==
Parkison was born in Oklahoma and earned her Bachelor of Arts with Honors in English Language and Literature/Letters from Oklahoma State University in 2000, where she was art editor and fiction editor of Papyrus, the undergraduate literary magazine. She earned her Master of Fine Arts from Cornell University in 2002, and taught there as a lecturer of Creative Writing from September 2002 to May 2004.

Parkison worked as an Associate Professor of English at the University of North Carolina at Charlotte, where she taught Creative Writing, including fiction, poetry, and screenwriting. Parkison was the Creative Writing Coordinator of the English Department the faculty sponsor and chapter adviser for the UNC-C Sigma Tau Delta, Beta Sigma chapter.

Parkison has served as a visiting faculty member at the British Council’s International Creative Writing Summer School in Athens, Greece. Parkison has served as a fiction faculty member at Chautauqua Writers’ Festival.

Her fiction has appeared in translation in Italian literary magazines L’IRCOCERVO and Lunario.

Parkison has served as guest editor of New Flash Fiction Review. She works an Associate Professor of Creative Writing-Fiction at Oklahoma State University, where she directed the MFA/PhD Creative Writing Program for two years. Since 2019, she has served as a member of the FC2 Board of Directors.

== Fiction ==
Winner of the FC2 Catherine Doctorow Innovative Fiction Prize as well as the first annual Starcherone Fiction Prize, Parkison is the author of four short story collections and one novel. Parkison’s prose and poetry have appeared in literary magazines, anthologies, and academic journals. Her short story collection, Woman With the Dark Horses (2004), was selected by Cris Mazza for the first annual Starcherone Prize. Parkison's second short story collection, The Innocent Party, was published by BOA Editions in 2012.

Her fourth book, a story collection entitled Refrigerated Music for a Gleaming Woman, was published by FC2 in 2017 and won the Catherine Doctorow Innovative Fiction Prize.

She was awarded a North Carolina Arts Council Fellowship in Prose Writing and a Hearst Fellowship from the American Antiquarian Society Her most recent short poetic novel called The Petals of Your Eyes, about kidnapped girls who become actors in a secret theater was published in May 2014.

Parkison regularly holds fiction readings and writing workshops at colleges throughout the country. She will also participate in the Association of Writers & Writing Programs Conference Association of Writers & Writing Programs 2014 in Seattle. As part of the Women Writing Violence panel, she will discuss how today’s literature often ignores the trend of "Women Writing Violence." She is now working on a new story collection, a screenplay, and a historical novel.

She has received a Christopher Isherwood Fellowship, a Writers at Work Fellowship, and a Kurt Vonnegut Fiction Prize from the North American Review, the oldest literary magazine in the US.

Her primary areas of interest include fiction writing, creative nonfiction, screenwriting and film studies and women’s studies. She currently is working on a new story collection, a screenplay, and a historical novel.

== Reviews ==
In addition to fiction writing, Parkison has written a review titled "All the Pretty Things;" an evaluation of The Beautiful Anthology that appeared in the American Book Review. Vol. 33, No. 5: 20.

== Books ==
- The Petals of Your Eyes. Starcherone Books, Buffalo, NY: May 13, 2014. ISBN 978-1938603204
- The Innocent Party. BOA Editions, Ltd. (American Reader Series), Rochester, NY: April 17, 2012. ISBN 978-1934414866
- Woman with Dark Horses. Starcherone Press: Buffalo, NY: January 1, 2004. [Note: This book, a short story collection, was the winner of the 2003 Starcherone Fiction Prize.] ISBN 978-0970316554
- Girl Zoo. FC2/University of Alabama Press, Tuscaloosa:Feb 19, 2019. ISBN 978-1573660709

== Awards and Distinctions ==
- FC2 Catherine Doctorow Innovative Fiction Prize for the story collection, Refrigerated Music for a Gleaming Woman, selected by contest judge, Stephen Graham Jones
- First place in North American Review’s first annual Kurt Vonnegut Fiction Prize for an original short story, “Warnings” in 2004
- First Place in Starcherone Press 2003 Fiction Prize for Innovative Writing for the story collection Woman with Dark Horses
- Jack Dyer Fiction Prize for the short story “The Upstairs Album” selected by Carolyn Alessio, prose editor of Crab Orchard Review, 2001
- 2013 William Randolph Hearst Creative Artist Fellow, American Antiquarian Society Fellowship for Creative and Performing Artists and Writers
- 2013 North Carolina Arts Council Fellowship in Prose Writing
