= Maurice J. O'Sullivan =

American academic

Maurice J. "Socky" O'Sullivan (born 1944) is a historian and literary scholar who specialises in the history of Florida. As the Kenneth Curry Professor of Literature at Rollins College in Winter Park, Florida. Professor O'Sullivan has lectured and published extensively on the state's art and history, religion and politics, literature and culture.

He and Rollins History Professor Jack Lane have been recognized as founders of the interdisciplinary Florida Studies movement with their book The Florida Reader (Pineapple Press), 1991; paperback 1995), the first comprehensive collection of writings about Florida, and through teachers' workshops for the Florida Endowment for the Humanities and the Florida Humanities Council.

== Early life ==
Born in Jersey City, New Jersey (July 15, 1944), the son of Maurice and Agnes O'Sullivan, Professor O'Sullivan attended St. Peter's Prep before receiving his bachelor's degree from Fairfield University (1966) and his Master's and Doctoral degrees from Case Western Reserve University (1967, 1969).

== Career ==
After several years at Ohio State, he joined the Rollins faculty in 1975. At Rollins he has served as President of the Faculty and Chair of the English Department and Humanities Division.

Director of the Florida Center for the Shakespeare Studies, in 2005, he became publisher of the Angel Alley Press at Rollins and is a senior partner in the Dan McGuinnis Irish Pubs in Nashville. He serves on the board of the Florida Historical Society. Professor O'Sullivan currently lives in Orlando.

O'Sullivan has been featured at FreedomFest in 2007, 2008, and 2009. He is a member of the Catholic Church.

O'Sullivan has modeled himself to be someone who takes pride in getting involved in both educating his community and leading it. Throughout his career, he has given roughly 300 lectures, presentations, and workshops on Florida Studies, Irish culture, popular culture, rhetoric, literature, the Bible, English art, and Shakespeare. His dedication to all of these subjects shows in his achievements and participation within various communities and activities, as well as his written works.

== Books ==
O'Sullivan has worked on numerous books with academic colleagues and on his own pertaining to Florida history and culture.

Below is a list of books that he has published throughout the years.

- with Jack Lane. The Reader. : Pineapple Press, 1991. Reissued in paperback Winter 1995. (1992 Carlton Tebeau Award Winner)
- with Jane Anderson Jones. Florida in Poetry: A History of the Imagination. Sarasota: Pineapple Press, 1995.
- Elizabeth Smith's The Book of Job. Delmar, New York: Scholars' Facsimiles and Reprints, 1996.
- with Steve Glassman. Crime Fiction and Film in the Sunshine State: Florida Noir. Bowling Green: Popular Culture Press, 1997. (1998 Edgar Nominee from Mystery Writers of America) --Reissued by the University of Wisconsin Press in 2014.
- With Jack Lane. A Twentieth Century American Reader 1900 – 1945. Washington, DC. United States Information Agency.1999.
- Shakespeare's Other Lives. London and Jefferson, North Carolina: McFarland, 1997. (Paperback edition 2005)
- With Jack Lane. A Twentieth Century American Reader. Washington, D.C.: United States Information Agency, 1999.
- with Steve Glassman. Orange Pulp: Florida Stories of Mayhem, Murder, and Mystery. Gainseville: University of Florida Press, 2000.
- With Steve Glassman. Bad Boys and Bad Girls in the Badlands: Crime Fiction and Film in the Southwest. Bowling Green. Popular Culture Press, 2001. (Reissued by the University of Wisconsin Press in 2014.)
- with Stuart Omans. Shakespeare Plays the Classroom. Pineapple Press. Sarasota: Pineapple Press, 2003.
- The Books of Job. Cambridge Scholars Press. 2008.
- With Wenxian Zhang, eds, A Trip to Florida for Health and Sport: The Lost Florida Novel of Cyrus Parkhurst Condit. Florida Historical Society, 2009.
- Executive Editor. Florida Studies. Newcastle: Cambridge Scholars Publishing, 2011.
- With Wenxian Zhang and Yiqi Yu. A Winter in Sunshine (阳光灿烂的冬季). Shanghai: Shanghai University Press, 2012. (The first dual language book published by any major Chinese university press, this is a revised edition of Condit's A Trip to Florida.)
- With Bruce Stephenson. Florida’s Golden Age 1880-1930. Cocoa, FL: The Florida Historical Society Press, 2018.

== Additional publications ==
In addition to the books he's published, O'Sullivan has produced many articles and book chapters throughout his professional career. He has also used his expertise to provide context and translation for historical information. As of most recent, he has had a hand in producing and writing within documentary films, all of which will be listed below.

=== Article/book chapters ===
1. “An Ecstasy of Delight and Admiration: McCall and Audubon in Florida.” Florida Studies. Newcastle upon Tyne: Cambridge Scholars Press, 2018. 77-87.
2. “A Rambling Pedigree: The Eclectic Cultural Embrace of Florida’s Golden Age,” Florida’s Golden Age.” Cocoa, FL: The Florida Historical Society Press, 2018. 219-244.
3. “Florida’s Garbage Inspires Poetic Masterpiece, Forum (Fall 2017), 16-17.
4. “When Languages Collide,” Forum (Spring 2017), 32-33.
5. “Florida’s African Soul and Soil,” Forum (Winter 2016), 30-33.
6. “Theodore Pratt and the Fiction of Nostalgia,” The Journal of Florida Literature. 24 (2016), 1-24.
7. “The Poetry of Bugs,” Forum (Spring 2016), 28-30.
8. "Interpreting Florida: Its Nineteenth Century Literary Heritage." Florida Historical Quarterly. 94.3 (Winter 2016). 320-365.
9. “Mining Our Essential Truths,” Forum (Summer 2015), 26-28.
10. “Echoes in the Wind,” Forum (Spring 2015) 32-34.
11. “Extegrity, Or the Academic Midway,” European Journal of Educational Sciences. 2.1 (March 2015), 42-54.
12. “In Memoriam: Patrick Smith,” Florida Historical Quarterly 92.3 (Winter 2014), 652-660.
13. “Troublesome Neighbors: The English in Florida,” Florida Studies, ed. Paul D. Reich. Newcastle upon Tyne: Cambridge Scholars Publishing, 2014. pp. 61–87.
14. “Poetry and Pie, Forum: The Magazine of the Florida Humanities Council,” 38.3 (Fall 2014), 32-34.
15. “Have You Not Hard of Floryda?,” Forum: The Magazine of the Florida Humanities Council, 38.2
16. “The Double Helix: The Idea of Spain in Florida’s Literary Imagination 1513-2013”/”La doble hélice: La idea de España en la imaginación literaria de Florida 1513-2013” in Culturally La Florida: Spain’s New World Legacy: Proceedings of the Conference May 3–6, 2012. St. Augustine: Flagler College, 2012.
17. “El dedo del gigante: La Florida del Inca.” Florida Studies: Proceedings of the 2011 Florida College English Conference. Newcastle upon Tyne: Cambridge Scholars Press, 2012.
18. "This Incomperable Lande" (PDF). The Florida Historical Quarterly. 89 (4). Florida Historical Society: 417–422. Spring 2011.
19. “La Relación de Alvar Núñez Cabeza de Vaca,” Florida Studies: Proceedings of the 2010 Florida College English Association, ed. Paul D. Reich. Newcastle upon Tyne. Cambridge Scholars Press, 2011.
20. “Riders of the Purple Surf: Florida’s Cracker Cowboys,” Florida Studies: Proceedings of the 2009 Florida College English Association, ed. Claudia Slate and Carole Policy (Newcastle upon Tyne: Cambridge Scholars Publishing, 2010)
21. “Artes Illiberales: The Four Myths of Liberal Education,” Change Magazine (September/October 2009)
22. “Coming of Age in Antebellum Florida,” Florida Studies: Proceedings of the 2008 Annual Meeting for the Florida College English Association. Newcastle: Cambridge Scholars Publishing, 2009.
23. With Jack C. Lane. “My Dear Mrs. Baskin: Marjorie Kinnan Rawlings and Hamilton Holt,” The Marjorie Kinnan Rawlings Journal of Literature. Vol XVII (2009), 1-8.
24. “Florida Picaresque,” Studies: Proceedings of the 2007 English Association (Newcastle upon Tyne: Cambridge Scholars Publishing, 2008) 33-43.
25. “Atala: le premier roman de Floride,” Florida Studies: Proceedings of the 2006 Florida College English Association (Cambridge: Cambridge Scholars Press, 2007), 28-34.
26. “Ecocriticism (and Its Discontents),” International Journal of the Humanities, 5.6 (2007), 119-124.
27. “Jesus in the Middle Kingdom,” America, 196.6 (19 February 2007) 18-19.
28. “Bucklin Moon and My Brother Bill,” Faulkner Journal of Japan (April 2005), 72-86.
29. “Many Voices Thrive,” Forum 27.3 (Fall 2003), 22-25.
30. “His Letters Bear His Mind” Re-Writing Shakespeare,” Shakespeare Plays the Classroom (Sarasota: Pineapple Press, 2003).
31. “Musing on Waters, Dark and Lively” Forum (Summer 2002)
32. “It’s Later Than You Think: The Memoirs of Bucklin Moon,” Marjorie Kinnan Rawlings Journal of Florida Literature, 11 (2002), 71-81.
33. “Tony Hillerman and the Navajo Way,” Bad Boys and Bad Girls of the Badlands (Bowling Green: Popular Press, 2001)
34. "A Bibliography of Southwestern Crime Fiction,” Bad Boys and Bad Girls of the Badlands (Bowling Green: Popular Press, 2001).
35. "Ecological Noir," Florida Noir (Bowling Green: Popular Press, 1997). [The novels of Randy Wayne White.]
36. "Fairy Tale Noir," Florida Noir (Bowling Green: Popular Press, 1997). [The Matthew Hope series by Ed McBain.]
37. with Lynne Phillips, "A Bibliography of Mysteries, 1895-1996," Florida Noir (Bowling Green: Popular Press, 1997).
38. "'Subtly of Herself Contemplative': The Legends of Lilith," Studies in the Humanities (Winter 1993).
39. "A Stream of Stories," (Florida Humanities Council) Forum (Spring-Summer 1993). [An essay on the literature of the Suwanee River]
40. with Jane Jones, "Florida Poetry" in The Booklover's Guide to Florida, ed. Kevin McCarthy (Sarasota: Pineapple Press, 1992).
41. "Florida's Detectives" in The Booklover's Guide to Florida, ed. Kevin McCarthy (Sarasota: Pineapple Press, 1992).
42. With Jack Lane, "Zora Neale Hurston at Rollins," in Zora in Florida, ed. Kathryn Seidel and Steve Glassman (Gainesville: University of Florida Press, 1991), 130-145.
43. "Shakespeare, Johnson, and Wolsey: A Community of Mind," Sydney Studies in English, 14 (1988–89), 13-20.
44. "Postlapsarians: Louis Auchincloss's The Covenant," Dutch Quarterly Review, 18.1 (1988), 38-45.
45. "Shakespeare's Other Lives," Shakespeare Quarterly, 32.2 (Summer 1987), 133‑153. [An essay on Shakespeare's appearance as a fictional character in novels, stories, and plays.]
46. "The Group Journal," The Journal of General Education 38.4 (1987), 288‑300. [Developing collective journals, novels, and plays as a pedagogical tool.]
47. "The Duties of Slaves: The Slave Bible of 1807," International Review of History and Political Science, 24.3 (August 1987), 1-9.
48. "'How Now! What Means This Passion at His Name?'" American Notes and Queries, 24.9‑10 (May/June 1986). [A continuing controversy over Swift's attitude towards Portugal.]
49. "Dutchman's Demons: Lula and Lilith," Notes on Modern American Literature, 10.1 (1986). [Biblical sources for LeRoi Jones' play.]
50. "Swift's Pedro de Mendez," American Notes and Queries, 22.9-10, (May/June 1984). [A possible source for Swift's character.]
51. "Garp Unparadised: Biblical Echoes in John Irving's The World According to Garp," Notes on Modern American Literature, .2, (Fall 1983).
52. "'To His Very Faults': Notes on Dryden, Johnson, and Juvenal's Third Satire," Classical and Modern Literature, 2.3 (Spring 1982), 161‑69.
53. Running Division on the Groundwork: Dryden's Theory of Translation," Neophilologus 64.1 (1980) 144‑59.
54. "Of Souls and Pottage: James Weldon Johnson's The Autobiography of Ex-Coloured Man," CLA Journal, 23.1 (Fall 1979), 60‑70.
55. "Native Genius for Disunion: Marianne Moore's 'Spenser's Ireland,' Concerning Poetry, 7.1 (Fall 1979), 42‑47.
56. "Slaughterhouse-Five: Kurt Vonnegut's Anti‑Memoirs," Essays in Literature, 3.2 (Fall 1976), 244‑50.
57. "Ex Alieno Ingenio Poeta: Johnson's Translation of Pope's Messiah," Philological Quarterly, 54.3 (Summer 1975), 579‑591.
58. "Up Against the Shambles' Gate: Robert Browning and the Loss of Leaders," Mosaic, 7.2 (Winter 1974), 101‑108.
59. "Matthew Arnold: Un Milton jeune et voyageant," Milton Quarterly, 7.3 (October 1973), 82‑84. ['s play on the ending of Paradise Lost.]
60. "The Mask of Allusion in Robert Hayden's 'The Diver,'" CLA Journal, 17.1 (September 1973), 85‑92.
61. with Todd M. Leiber, "'Native Sons'? Black Students on Black Literature, Black American Literature Forum, 5.1 (Spring 1971), 3‑7.

=== Translations ===
1. (From the Latin) Jacques le Moyne de Morgues, "Paintings of the Timucua." In The Florida Reader, ed. Maurice O'Sullivan and Jack C. Lane (Sarasota: Pineapple Press, 1991), pp. 83–92.
2. (From the French) François-Réne de Chateaubriand, Atala. In The Florida Reader (Sarasota: Pineapple Press, 1991), pp. 92–94.
3. (From the French) Nicholas Le Challeux, "Huitain". In Florida in Poetry (Sarasota: Pineapple Press, 1995)
4. (From the French) Alexandre Duval. Shakespeare Amoreaux. In Shakespeare's Other Lives. (North Carolina: McFarland, 1995), pp. 26–43.

=== Films ===
1. Executive Producer and Writer. Have You Not Hard of Floryda? (Interviews with Florida Poets). 2012. Winner of 2012 David C. Brotemarkle Award from the Florida Historical Society for Outstanding Creative Work about Florida History
2. Executive Producer and Writer. Romeo and Juliet. (A documentary examining Shakespeare's language.). 2010.
3. Executive Producer and Co-Writer, Getting Lear. (A documentary exploring how Shakespeare's King Lear offers insights into the effects of aging on families.): 2008.

=== Miscellaneous projects ===
1. With Carol Frost, editors. The Rollins Book of Verse 1885 – 2010. Winter Park: Angel Alley Press, 2010. (One of five finalists in the National Independent Book Award for anthologies.)
2. Contributor, Natural Florida in Word, Image and Deed. Florida Humanities Council CD-ROM developed by the Florida Defenders of the Environmenbt, Inc. 2007.
3. Executive Editor, Fiat Lux: Teaching in Paradise (Angel Alley Press, 2004)
4. Executive Producer, World Premiere of Bromo Bombastes. On Common Ground XI: The International Lawrence Durrell Conference, Corfu. (July 7, 2000).
5. Editor, Re-Englishing: A Workbook for Teachers (1978).

== Awards ==
In 2002, the Rollins Trustees awarded him the William Fremont Blackman Award for distinguished service. While at Rollins, he has received two silver medals in the Council for the Advancement and Support of Education National Teacher of the Year Program, the Bornstein Award for Scholarship, the Arthur Vining Davis Award, the Hamilton Holt Teaching Award, and two Hugh McKean Awards.

He has also served twice as President of the Florida College English Association, which gave him its Distinguished Colleague Award in 2003, and as President of the College English Association in 2006.

Full Table of Awards (oldest to newest)

Award	Year
NDEA Fellow, Case Western Reserve University	1966-69
University Fellow, Case Western Reserve University	1966-69
Arthur Vining Davis Fellow (Rollins College Teaching Award)	1979-80
Omicron Delta Kappa Award	1982
Wilbur Dorsett Fellowship (English-Speaking Union)	1983
Distinguished Teaching Award, Rollins College	1985
Silver Medal Award, Council for The Advancement and Support of Education National Professor of the Year Award (for "achievements in creative planning, producing, and promoting of programs and communications")	1986
Silver Medal Award, Council for The Advancement and Support of Education National Professor of the Year Award (Carnegie Foundation for the Advancement of Teaching ["for extraordinary contributions to the lives and careers of undergraduate students and to the intellectual welfare of society"])	1987
Hugh and Jeannette McKean Grant	1988
Wildcat Pride Award (Winter Park High School)	1990
Rollins College Commencement Speaker (Selected by Senior Class)	1990
Florida Historical Society's Charlton Tebeau Award for the Outstanding Book of the Year	1992
The Hugh F. McKean Award ("selected by students to symbolize outstanding teaching")	1994
Edgar Nominee (Mystery Writers of America)	1998
Hugh F. McKean Award (“by the senior class in recognition of outstanding teaching”)	2000
Rhea Marsh Smith Winter Park History Research Grant	2001
William Fremont Blackman Medal (Rollins College Trustees Recognition for distinguished service)	2002
Distinguished Colleague Award, Florida College English Association (“for his extraordinary contributions to his discipline and his state”)	2003
Bornstein Award for Faculty Scholarship	2005
Florida Historical Society's Patrick Smith Award	2010
Florida Historical Society's David C. Brotemarkle Award for Creative Achievement	2012
Florida Magazine Association, Charlie Award for Writing Excellence (Columnist of the Year)	2015
Grand Marshal, Winter Park St. Patrick's Day Parade	2017

== Service ==
This is a CV.

It has clearly been written and prepared by the subject himself.

O'Sullivan has held various positions within multiple Rollins College Committees, ranging from advising to chair positions. His commitment to service goes beyond these positions, as he often advocates for student-led organizations throughout college semesters. The list below provides specific and official positions and the years held related to Rollins Committees.

Position/Committee	Year(s) held
Chair/ Orientation Committee	1976-77
Faculty Advisor/ Kappa Alpha Theta sorority	1977-80,1988-1995
Chair/ Student Life Committee	1977-78
Faculty Advisor/ English Association	1979-1981
Secretary/ Council on Administration and Budget	1980-81
Faculty Advisor/ Off-Campus Student Association Founding Advisor	1980-88
College Marshal	1980–Present
Chair/ Teaching/Learning Committee	1981-85
Faculty Advisor/ Pre-Law Society	1982-89
Chair/ Continuing Education Committee	1984-86
Chair/ Curriculum Committee	1986-87
Chair/ Humanities Division	1986-2006
President of the Faculty	1980–present
Chair/ Academic Affairs Committee	1993-94
Co-Chair, Areas of Distinction Committee, College Planning Committee, Chair/ Curriculum Task Force	1996-97
Founding Advisor/ Sigma Tau Delta Honorary Society	1998-2008
Faculty Advisor/ Tau Kappa Epsilon	2009-2011
Parliamentarian/ Arts and Sciences Faculty	2011-15
Chair/ Faculty Evaluation Committee	2012-13
Member, Senate Executive Committee, Executive Council, College Senate, Faculty Evaluation Committee	?

Professional/community activities (out of order)
Position/activity	Year(s) held
President Elect/ Florida Historical Society	2018–present
Executive Vice President/ Central Florida English Speaking Union	2018–present
Publisher/ Angel Alley Press	2000–present
First Vice President/ Florida Historical Society	2016-18
Senior Partner/ Dan McGuinness Pubs Inc. (Nashville)	?
Editorial Board/ The Majorie Kinnan Rawlings Journal of Florida Literature	2000–present
Literary Consultant/ Florida Humanities Council, Forum Magazine	?
Consultant, Lecturer on Installation/ Orlando Museum of Art	2012
President/ Florida College English Association	2010-11
President/ College English Association	2006-07
Board of Directors/ College English Association	2004-07
President/ Florida College English Association	2001-02
Member/ Board of Florida College Association	1998-2012
Board of Directors/ Florida Historical Society	2008–present
Board of Directors/ Central Florida English Speaking Union	2011–present
Co-Director/ The Florida Center for Shakespeare Studies	1996–present
Co-Director/ Drey Summer Shakespeare Institute	1997-2007
Executive Committee/ One Community, One Book Program	2001-07
Resident Scholar/ National Endowment for the Humanities Teacher Seminar "Jump at the Sun: Zora Neale Hurston and Her Eatonville Roots" (July 2008); Scholar	2009–present
Resident Scholar, Evaluator/ Florida Humanities Council Center for Teachers	1996
Resident Scholar/ Florida Center for Teachers Seminar on Florida: Visions of Paradise	1994
Consultant/ Southern Association of Colleges and Schools on Accreditation of Colleges	1979-2002
Advisory Board/ Center for Florida History and Politics (USF)	?
Advisory Committee/ St. Augustine Quincentennial	2015
Evaluator/ Manatee Community College's "In Search of Florida Voices" Poetry Project	1994
Co-Chair/ College English Association Convention Host Committee	1994
Chair/ Florida College English Association Nominating Committee	1991-92, 1998
Chair/ Florida College English Association Distinguished Colleague Award	2004–present
Consultant/ Carson-Newman College on Strategic Planning	1991
Advisory Board/ Winter Park High School Counseling Program	1990-91
President/ Winter Park High Lacrosse Booster Club	1992-93
Executive Committee/ Winter Park High Soccer Booster Club	1989-92
Ninth Judicial Circuit Grievance Committee/ Florida Bar	1987-90
Parish Council/ St. Margaret Mary Church	1982-85
Executive Committee/ St. Margaret Mary Church	1983-85
Director/ Florida Endowment for the Humanities Institute on Lyric Poetry	1985
Director/ Florida Endowment for the Humanities Institute on Florida History	1987-89
Director/ Re:Englishing Workshop for Secondary School Teachers	1978
Staff member/ Great Lakes College Association Teaching/Course Design Workshop (Kenyon College)	1980
