= Kossen Gregory =

American politician (1922–2019)

Member of the Virginia House of Delegates from the Roanoke district
- In office January 13, 1954 – January 8, 1964 Serving with Julian Rutherfoord (1954–1962); M. Caldwell Butler (1962–1964)
- Preceded by: E. Griffith Dodson Jr.
- Succeeded by: Willis M. Anderson

Personal details
- Born: January 21, 1922 Roanoke, Virginia, U.S.
- Died: June 29, 2019 (aged 97) Roanoke, Virginia, U.S.
- Party: Democratic
- Spouse: Sarah Massie Goode (m. 1943)
- Children: 3
- Parent: Herbert B. Gregory (father)
- Education: Hampden–Sydney College (BA); Northwestern University; University of Virginia School of Law (LLB)
- Occupation: Politician; lawyer; educator; businessman

Kossen Gregory (January 21, 1922 – June 29, 2019) was an American politician, lawyer, educator and businessman from Virginia. He served as a member of the Virginia House of Delegates from 1953 to 1963. He was a member of the Perrow Commission.

== Early life ==
Kossen Gregory was born on January 21, 1922, in Roanoke, Virginia, to Margaret (née Kossen) and Herbert B. Gregory. His father was a justice of the Virginia Supreme Court. He attended Jefferson High School and graduated magna cum laude from Hampden–Sydney College with a Bachelor of Arts in 1942. He trained to be an officer at the United States Naval Reserve Midshipmen's School at Northwestern University in Chicago. He was commissioned as an ensign.

Gregory served in the U.S. Navy during World War II. From 1942 to 1946, he served on a destroyer in the Atlantic fleet, as an instructor at the Midshipmen's School at Northwestern University and also worked in special services in the Pacific theater. He attained the rank of lieutenant. After the war, he attended the University of Virginia School of Law and graduated with a Bachelor of Laws in 1948. He was a member of Kappa Sigma and Phi Alpha Delta.

== Career ==
Gregory was elected president of the University of Virginia School of Law in 1947. He also served as chairman of the honor committee and was a member of the Raven Society.

Gregory practiced law with the firm Burks, Woodrum & Staples from 1948 to 1963. He was a Democrat and served as a member of the Virginia House of Delegates, representing Roanoke, from 1953 to 1963. He was a member of the Young Turks group of delegates that challenged the Byrd machine. He served on the Perrow Commission that challenge public school integration in Virginia. He did not seek re-election in 1963. In 1960, he was a campaign manager in Roanoke for John F. Kennedy's presidential campaign.

In 1963, Gregory began a career in business and served as president and chief executive officer of General Stone and Materials Corporation. As an executive, he was involved in a series of acquisitions and mergers. The company ended up as a division of Medusa Corporation. From 1976 to 1988, he was president of Southern Stone Industries Inc.

Gregory became president of the Roanoke area chapter of the Hampden–Sydney College Alumni Association in 1955.

== Personal life ==
Gregory married Sarah Massie Goode, daughter of state senator Morton G. Goode, on June 26, 1943. They had a son and two daughters, Kossen Jr., Elizabeth and Martha.

Gregory died on June 29, 2019, at his home in Roanoke.
