= A. D. Coleman =

American photography critic

- Born: Allan Douglass Coleman; December 19, 1943 (age 82); Brooklyn, New York, U.S.
- Education: Lehman College
- Occupations: Photography critic; historian; curator; educator
- Writing career
- Genre: Non-fiction
- Subjects: Art criticism, Photography, Digital technology
- Notable awards: Top 100 People in Photography (American Photo, 1974)
- Website: www.nearbycafe.com

Allan Douglass Coleman (born 1943) is an independent American critic, historian, educator, and curator of photography and photo-based art, and a widely published commentator on new digital technologies. He has published eight books and more than 2000 essays on photography and related subjects. He has lectured and taught internationally; his work has been translated into 21 languages and published in 31 countries.

== Early life and education ==
Coleman was born in Brooklyn, New York, on December 19, 1943. His parents were of Russian and Polish descent on the side of his father, Earl M. Coleman, and Scots on the side of his mother, née Frances Louise Allan. During the McCarthy era (1951–3) his family moved to France, during which time he became bilingual francophone, and then briefly to England, before returning to the U.S. Aside from that interruption he was raised in Manhattan, where he went to school at, successively, P.S. 41 and P.S. 3 in Greenwich Village, Stuyvesant High School, and Hunter College (Bronx campus), now known as Lehman College.

While at Hunter he worked on both the bi-campus newspaper, the Hunter Arrow, and the school literary magazine, Echo. In 1963 he published a one-act-play in Echo, titled "Midnight Mass", that evoked the wrath of the conservative Catholic newspaper The Tablet (Diocese of Brooklyn), resulting in a public uproar that nearly ended up with the imposition of censorship on all CUNY publications. In 1963–64 he served as editor-in-chief of the Hunter Arrow. He received his B.A. in English Literature from Hunter in 1964, and was named to Sigma Tau Delta, the English honors society.

== Professional activity ==
Coleman was the first photo critic for The New York Times, authoring 120 articles during his tenure. He started writing in 1967 and has contributed to The Village Voice, The New York Observer and numerous magazines, artist monographs and other publications worldwide.

He was named one of The Top 100 People in Photography by American Photo Magazine in 1974.

Coleman launched The Nearby Café, an online magazine, in 1995.

== Awards ==
- 1976: Art Critic's Fellowship, National Endowment for the Arts—the first such fellowship awarded to a photography critic by the NEA
- 1993: Guest Scholar, J. Paul Getty Museum (Los Angeles, California)
- 1994: Fulbright Senior Scholar in Sweden
- 1996: Ansel and Virginia Adams Distinguished Scholar-in-Residence, Center for Creative Photography (Tucson, Arizona)
- 2002: Culture Prize, German Society for Photography—the first critic of photography so honored

== Publications ==
He has had several collections of his reviews/criticism published in book form including:

- Looking at Photographs: People. Coleman, A. D. et al. Chronicle Books. ISBN 978-0-8118-0446-2
- The Grotesque in Photography. Coleman, A. D. Summit Books, 1977. ISBN 978-0-671-40016-3
- Light Readings: A Photography Critic's Writings 1968-1978. Coleman, A. D. Oxford University Press, 1982. ISBN 978-0-19-503196-6
- Looking at Photographs: Animals. Coleman, A. D. et al. Chronicle Books, 1995. ISBN 978-0-8118-0418-9
- Tarnished Silver: Essays and Lectures 1979-1989. Coleman, A. D. Midmarch Press, 1996. ISBN 978-1-877675-20-1
- Critical Focus: Photography in the International Image Community. Coleman, A. D. Nazraeli Press, 1996. ISBN 978-3-923922-26-0
- The Digital Evolution Visual Communication in the Electronic Age. Coleman, A. D. Nazraeli Press, Tucson, AZ 1998. ISBN 978-3-923922-52-9
- Depth of Field: Essays on Photography, Mass Media, and Lens Culture. Coleman, A. D. Albuquerque: University of New Mexico Press, 1998. ISBN 978-0-8263-1815-2
