= Robert Whitehead (Virginia politician) =

American politician (1897–1960)

Member of the Virginia House of Delegates for Nelson and Amherst Counties
- In office January 14, 1942 – June 8, 1960
- Preceded by: J. Tinsley Coleman Jr.
- Succeeded by: James W. Davis

Personal details
- Born: September 21, 1897 Lovingston, Nelson County, Virginia, U.S.
- Died: June 8, 1960 (aged 62)
- Party: Democratic
- Spouse(s): Sallie Carter, Myra Loving McGinness
- Children: Ann Carter Whitehead Thomas, Maria Ballard Whitehead Grove
- Education: University of Virginia; University of Virginia School of Law

Robert Whitehead (September 21, 1897 – June 8, 1960) was an American politician and lawyer from the U.S. state of Virginia. A member of the Democratic Party, and for many years leader of the party's opposition to the Byrd Organization, he served as a member of the Virginia House of Delegates from 1942 until his death after the 1960 legislative session, representing his native Nelson County, Virginia as well as adjacent Amherst County.

== Early and family life ==
Robert Whitehead was born in Lovingston, Virginia, on September 21, 1897, the third child born to Stuart Baldwin Whitehead and his wife the former Susan Withers Massie. He was named after his grandfather Robert Whitehead. Educated in the Lovingston public school and Lynchburg High School, he taught for a year at the Mountain Cove School in Steven's Cove, Virginia before entering the University of Virginia. Whitehead soon interrupted his education by volunteering to serve in World War I. Upon his discharge and return to Charlottesville, Whitehead graduated with a law degree (LLB). He was a member of the Raven Society, Omicron Delta Kappa, Tau Kappa Alpha, and the Rotunda Club.

Whitehead married Sallie Carter (1904-1952) and they had two daughters, Ann Carter Whitehead and Maria Ballard Whitehead, whom they raised in the house they had built around 1925, "Windy Ridge" near Lovingston. Upon Sallie's death, Whitehead eventually married Myra Loving McGinnis, who survived him. He was active in the Episcopal Church, especially Trinity Episcopal Church in Oak Ridge, Virginia.

== Political career ==
Upon admission to the Virginia bar, Whitehead tried to practice law in Lynchburg with J. Lindsey Coleman, but ultimately returned to Nelson County to practice law with his father beginning in 1921. Their office (established 1853) was on the courthouse green. Like his father and grandfather, Whitehead was elected Commonwealth Attorney of Nelson County and served from 1933-1941 (the three Whitehead prosecutors served a total of 72 years).

Although Virginia's Byrd Organization (while also Democrats) opposed many of President Franklin Delano Rooosevelt's reforms, and especially President Harry S Truman after he abolished racial segregation in the armed forces, Whitehead served as one of the Democratic Electors for FDR's third term in 1936, and later as Virginia State Chairman of the Truman Barkley Straight Ticket Committee in 1948. He was also a director of The First National Bank of Nelson County, and active in the Ruritan club, the American Legion, and on the Executive Committee of the Virginia State Bar.

A Democratic member of the House of Delegates from 1942-1960, Whitehead often opposed the Byrd Organization, which gave him poor committee assignments and often sought to marginalize him. During the Massive Resistance crisis in Virginia, Whitehead often pleaded with fellow legislators to save public education. He vehemently opposed radical interpositionists led by James J. Kilpatrick, and thought U.S. Rep. Howard Smith (a Byrd organization lieutenant) was a moderating voice, so one analyst called him a "cushioning segregationist." The most ardent segregationists proposed to withhold all state funds or even close any school or district that integrated, a stance Whitehead vehemently opposed. So as fellow legislators passed the Stanley Plan to prevent implementation of Brown v. Board of Education, Whitehead was often among the mere four or five dissenters. After a three-judge federal panel and the Virginia Supreme Court on January 18, 1959 declared key aspects of the Stanley Plan unconstitutional, Whitehead was appointed to the Perrow Commission, which sought gradual integration. The district number for Nelson and Amherst counties changed often during Whitehead's nearly two decades of service. It was the 49th district in the 1953, 1955 and 1959 elections.

== Death and legacy ==
Whitehead died a few months after the end of the 1960 legislative session. His portrait hangs in the Nelson County courthouse. His papers for the last couple of years of his life are held by the University of Virginia library, as part of its special collections. Old Dominion University has also placed several transcripts of his speeches during the Massive Resistance crisis online. The Nelson County Historical Society honored him in February, 2012.
