= Ruritan =

United States service club

- Ruritan National Inc.
- Formation: April 16, 1928; 98 years ago
- Founders: Tom Downing and Jack Gwaltney
- Founded at: Holland, Virginia, US
- Purpose: Community service
- Headquarters: 5451 Lyons Road
- Location: Dublin, Virginia, United States
- Executive Director: Sarah Kelly
- Publication: Ruritan Magazine
- Website: ruritan.org

Ruritan National is a service club located in small towns and rural areas in the United States. It aims to achieve "Fellowship, Goodwill and Community Service". The local clubs are autonomous from the national organization. Many Ruritan clubs sponsor local clubs or chapters of 4-H, the National FFA Organization, or a Boy Scouts of America troop.

== History ==
The first Ruritan Club, the Holland Ruritan Club, was founded on April 16, 1928 at the Holland Hotel in Holland, Virginia, now part of Suffolk, Virginia. Its founders, Thomas V. Downing and Jack Gwaltney, wanted to establish a civic organization for rural communities. Its purpose was "to make the rural community a better place in which to live by bringing together farmers and business and professional men in a community in the interest of community service, fellowship, and goodwill."

Ruritan was chartered on May 21, 1928; this is recognized by the group as its founding date. Along with Downing and Gwaltney, some of the charter members were W. E Beale, L. H. Gardner, J. D. Rawles, Hugh V. White, and H. L. Worrell Sr.

Almost immediately, the club added chapters in nearby counties. It was known as the National Order of Ruritans by 1930. Dr. J. M. Bland of Boykins, Virginia was its first national president. It held its first annual convention on January 15, 1932, in Suffolk, Virginia. Ten clubs and 200 delegates attended the convention. In 1935, the club spread outside of Virginia with the founding of a chapter in Sunbury, North Carolina.

On May 25, 1958, a nine-foot-tall granite monument was dedicated in Holland, Virginia to commemorate the founding of Ruritan National. By 1958, Ruritan National had more than 700 clubs in seventeen states, with more than 24,000 members who were a mixture of farmers and businessmen. Its diverse areas of service were reflected by its standing committees of the era:

- Welfare, Health, and Sanitation
- Recreation and Community Goodwill
- Agriculture and Farm Income
- Rural Church
- Rural Utilties
- Public Highways, Streets, and Buildings
- Education
- Industry and Business Methods
- Home and Home Beautification
- Conservation and Forestry
- Youth
- Safety

On January 17, 1965, the Ruritan held its 35th national convention in Philadelphia with World War I ace Eddie Rickenbacker as the keynote speaker. That year, it was the sixth largest civic club in the United States with more than 1,000 clubs in nineteen states.

In 2024, Ruritan National has over 23,000 members in more than 900 local clubs. Its national headquarters is located in Dublin, Virginia. Its publication is the Ruritan Magazine.

== Symbols ==
The club's name was suggested by Daisy Nurney, a reporter for The Virginian-Pilot. The name Ruritan was created from the Latin words for country (run) and small town (tan). Its motto is "Fellowship, Community Service, and Goodwill".

In 1930, the club selected its official insignia, a round gold pin with the words Ruritan and National in black, surrounding a black circle with the words Rus and Urbs that encircle the letter "R" in gold.

== Activities ==
Ruritan Clubs meet monthly. Unlike most community service organizations, Ruritan rarely has national programs, instead setting priorities based on the needs of its local communities. Many clubs provide and supervise community recreational centers, sponsor Little League and other athletic programs, build community parks and sports pitches, sponsor anti-litter campaigns, help the sick and needy, and provide a wide range of other activities to help improve their communities. Many Ruritan clubs sponsor local clubs or chapters of 4-H, the National FFA Organization, or a troop of the Boy Scouts of America or Girl Scouts of the USA.

== Organization ==
The Ruritan organization is made up of Ruritan Clubs. Club officers consist of a president, vice-president, secretary, treasurer, immediate past president, and 1st-, 2nd- and 3rd-year directors. Clubs are organized into zones, overseen by a zone governor, and zones are organized into districts.

== Notable members ==
Following is a list of some notable Ruritans.

- E. Almer Ames Jr., Virginia Senate
- Howard P. Anderson, Virginia Senate and Virginia House of Delegates
- John B. Boatwright, Virginia House of Delegates
- Andrew J. Boyle, United States Army lieutenant general
- Earle M. Brown, Virginia House of Delegates
- Stuart B. Carter, Virginia Senate and Virginia House of Delegates
- Myron Dossett, Kentucky House of Representatives
- Mills Godwin, Governor of Virginia, Lieutenant Governor of Virginia, Virginia Senate and Virginia House of Delegates
- Elmon T. Gray, Senate of Virginia and lumberman
- Garland Gray, Virginia Senate
- Major M. Hillard, Virginia Senate, Virginia House of Delegates, and Circuit Court judge
- Edd Houck, Senate of Virginia
- Jimmy Matlock, Tennessee House of Representatives
- Gerald McCormick, Tennessee House of Representatives
- Tony P. Moore, North Carolina General Assembly
- Blake T. Newton, Senate of Virginia
- Doug Overbey, United States Attorney for the Eastern District of Tennessee, Tennessee House of Representatives, and faculty of University of Tennessee College of Law
- Harold H. Purcell, Virginia Senate, Virginia House of Delegates, and Circuit Court judge
- Harold B. Singleton, Virginia House of Delegates and Circuit Court judge
- Robert Whitehead, Virginia House of Delegates
- J. J. Williams Jr., Virginia House of Delegates and member of the Federal Home Loan Bank Board
