= Harold B. Singleton =

American politician

Harold Brown Singleton

Member of the Virginia House of Delegates from the Amherst County, Virginia district
- In office January 14, 1942 – January 10, 1956
- Preceded by: James H. Massie
- Succeeded by: Earle M. Brown

Personal details
- Born: April 19, 1906 Boonsboro, Virginia, US
- Died: January 17, 1994 (aged 87) Madison Heights, Virginia, US
- Resting place: Amherst cemetery
- Occupation: Lawyer, politician, judge

Harold Brown Singleton (April 19, 1906 – January 17, 1994) was an American lawyer, fourteen-year member of the Virginia House of Delegates and for years judge in Lynchburg and Bedford and Amherst Counties.

== Early and family life ==
Harold Singleton was born to Harry Middleton Singleton (1871 - 1944) and his wife, schoolteacher Mary Leighton Nance (1873 - 1934) at his grandparents' home in Boonsboro, Bedford County, Virginia (later annexed to Lynchburg) on April 19, 1906. He attended the Bedford County Schools, then E.C. Glass High School in Lynchburg (graduating in 1925 after helping charter the local branch of the National Honor Society). He then studied at Lynchburg College and graduated with an A.B. degree.

He married Catherine Cecilia Lacy (1915 - 1967). He was active in his church (initially Lynchburg Baptist then Ascension Episcopal Church after the family moved to Madison Heights) and college alumni association, as well as the Lynchburg Lions, Elks, Odd Fellows and the Tau Kappa Alpha and Sigma Tau Delta honor societies. In addition, Singleton was active in the local Democratic Party (rising to vice-president of the 7th District club) and also held several offices with the Amherst Ruritan Club (rising to become district governor in 1958 and national president in 1963).

== Career ==
In 1937 Harold Singleton ordered a set of law books from an advertisement on the inside of a matchbook cover found in a Lynchburg restaurant. He studied the books for one year and passed the Virginia State Bar exam on his first attempt. In 1938, Singleton began practicing law in Amherst, Virginia with Lucien Schrader. In 1941, he was elected as a Democrat to the Virginia General Assembly to represent Amherst County, with the district expanded two years later to include Lynchburg. He was re-elected six time, and served 14 years (part-time) in the House of Delegates. He helped revise the Virginia Code in 1950. As Massive Resistance began Singleton was succeeded as delegate by fellow lawyer Earle M. Brown.

Legislators elected Singleton a judge of the Circuit Court in Lynchburg in 1964, and in 1967 he became judge of the regional juvenile and domestic relations court, later becoming Chief Judge of that court in the 24th Judicial Circuit (covering Amherst, Bedford, Campbell, Nelson Counties and the cities of Bedford, Lynchburg and Waynesboro) until his retirement in 1980. He then practiced law as the firm of Massie & Singleton until retiring in 1991.

== Death and legacy ==
Judge Singleton died on January 17, 1994. He was buried beside his wife in the Amherst cemetery.
