= Kevin Brown (poet) =

American writer and teacher

- Born: July 9, 1970; Jackson, Tennessee, U.S.
- Occupations: Author, poet, and teacher
- Writing career
- Notable works: Exit Lines (2009), Another Way (2012), They Love to Tell the Story: Five Contemporary Novelists Take on the Gospels (2012), A Lexicon of Lost Words (2014), Liturgical Calendar: Poems (2014)

Kevin Brown (born July 9, 1970) is an American poet, author and teacher. He has published three full collections of poems--Liturgical Calendar: Poems; A Lexicon of Lost Words; and Exit Lines, as well as a memoir, Another Way: Finding Faith, Then Finding It Again. He has also published essays in The Chronicle of Higher Education, Academe, InsideHigherEd, The Teaching Professor, and Eclectica Magazine. He has published a work of scholarship--They Love to Tell the Story: Five Contemporary Novelists Take on the Gospels—as well as critical articles on Kurt Vonnegut, John Barth, Ralph Ellison, Tony Earley, and what English majors do after graduation. He regularly writes reviews for NewPages.com, The Comics Journal, solrad, Intima, and Soapberry Review. He has also written about running for Like the Wind.

== Early life ==
Brown was born in Jackson, Tennessee. He grew up in Johnson City, Tennessee, with his parents and two siblings. Both of his parents worked at East Tennessee State University (ETSU). His father, Jim Brown, attended ETSU as a student and was inducted into the ETSU Athletic Hall of Fame in 2002. As a teenager, Brown competed in Bible Bowl competitions.

== Education ==
Brown received his Bachelor of Arts degree in English at Milligan College in Elizabethton, Tennessee. He went on to pursue a master's degree in English from East Tennessee State University and graduated in 1994. He finished his Ph.D. in English in December 1996, graduating from the University of Mississippi. He returned to school for a master's in library and information science, graduating in 1999 from the University of Alabama. He received his Master of Fine Arts in creative writing from Murray State University in 2012.

== Work experience ==
His first jobs were in private high schools, as Brown began teaching English in 1997 at the Culver Academies, where he also worked as an assistant coach for the girls basketball team. After attending the University of Alabama, he was hired at Stratford Academy, where he taught for one year before serving as librarian for one year. In 2001, he was hired at Lee University as an assistant professor of English. He worked for Lee for two years, then moved to Tacoma, Washington to take a position as Upper School Librarian. He worked there one year before returning to Lee, where he taught until 2021. He was a professor of English there, teaching both literature and creative writing courses. He was the first of only two professors to receive all three major faculty awards (teaching, advising, and scholarship). He currently teaches at Ensworth School, where he has taught or is teaching Advanced Placement Literature and Composition; 10th Grade English; Prose Writing; Writing, Rhetoric, and the Art of Persuasion; AP English Languages and Composition; AP English Literature and Composition; Greek Drama; and The Literature of Immigration. He also advised the literary magazine.

== Bibliography ==
Full-length poetry collections

Exit Lines: Poems (2009, Plain View Press)

A Lexicon of Lost Words (2014, Snake Nation Press)

Liturgical Calendar: Poems (2014, Wipf and Stock Publishers)

Jack Imagines a Different Map (forthcoming 2026, Finishing Line Press)

Chapbooks

Abecedarium (2011, Finishing Line Press)

Holy Days (2012, Split Oak Press)

Memoir

Another Way: Finding Faith, Then Finding Faith Again (2012, Wipf and Stock Publishers)

Literary criticism

They Love to Tell the Story: Five Contemporary Novelists Take on the Gospels (2012, Kennesaw State University Press)

== Awards and honors ==
- Lee University Excellence in Teaching award, 2011-12
- Lee University Excellence in Scholarship Recipient, 2009-10
- Lee University Excellence in Advising award, 2010-11
- Sigma Tau Delta Outstanding Regional Sponsor Award, Southern Region, 2010-11
- First Place in Violet Reed Haas Prize for Poetry, Snake Nation Press, 2012; A Lexicon of Lost Words
- Honorable Mention and Finalist in Quercus Review Spring Poetry Book Award Contest, 2014; Jack Imagines a Different Map
- First Place in Split Oak Press Chapbook Competition, 2011; Holy Days
- Finalist for Stephen Dunn Prize in Poetry (The Broome Review and Split Oak Press), 2011; Holy Days
- Semi-Finalist in Elixir Antivenom Poetry Award, 2011; A Lexicon of Lost Words
- Finalist in Elixir Press Eleventh Annual Poetry Awards, 2010; A Lexicon of Lost Words
- Finalist in Concrete Wolf Chapbook Award, 2010; Holy Days
- Finalist in Copperdome Poetry Chapbook Competition, 2010; Holy Days
- Finalist in Plan B Press Poetry Chapbook Competition, 2010; Holy Days
- Honorable Mention and Two Finalists for Joy Bale Boone Poetry Prize, The Heartland Review, 2010
- Two Honorable Mentions for Ruth Redel Poetry Contest, The Heartland Review, 2010
- Second Runner-Up in Concrete Wolf Chapbook Award, 2009; Abecedarium
