= Mosby Perrow Jr. =

American politician (1909–1973)

Member of the Virginia Senate from the 12th district
- In office 1943–1964
- Preceded by: Carter Glass Jr.
- Succeeded by: Robert S. Burruss Jr.

Personal details
- Born: March 5, 1909 Lynchburg, Virginia, U.S.
- Died: May 31, 1973 (aged 64) Lynchburg, Virginia, U.S.
- Spouse: Katherine Duane Wingfield
- Education: Washington and Lee University (BA); Duke University (LLB)
- Occupation: Lawyer
- Known for: Perrow Commission: end of "Massive Resistance"

Mosby Garland Perrow Jr. (born March 5, 1909 – May 31, 1973) was a Virginia lawyer and state senator representing Lynchburg, Virginia. A champion of Virginia's public schools, Perrow became a key figure in Virginia's abandonment of "Massive Resistance" to public school desegregation, including by chairing a joint legislative committee colloquially known as the Perrow Commission.

== Early life ==
Perrow was born in Lynchburg, Virginia to Dr. Mosby G. Perrow and Louise Polk (Joynes) Perrow. Perrow graduated from E.C. Glass High School and received a Bachelor of Arts degree from Washington and Lee University. As a student, he was involved in campus politics and spearheaded Lewis F. Powell, Jr.'s winning bid for student body president. Perrow received his law degree from Duke University.

On June 24, 1938, Perrow married Katherine Duane Wingfield of Lynchburg. They had three children: Duane Payne (Mrs. Wistar Palmer Nelligan), Mosby Garland Perrow III, and Edmund Wingfield Perrow. The Perrow family lived in the Fort Hill neighborhood of Lynchburg and at Staunton View Farm in Campbell County, Virginia.

== Career ==
Perrow practiced law in Lynchburg as a partner with the law firm of Perrow and Rosenberger. He was an active member of Memorial United Methodist Church, and a member of the board of directors of several private corporations and belonged to various civic organizations in the Lynchburg area. He enjoyed his time on his farm overlooking the Staunton River raising crops, hogs, and briefly, Black Angus.

== Virginia Senate ==
Perrow was elected to the Virginia Senate from the 12th Senatorial District in 1943 and served continuously until 1964. He was active in local and state Democratic Party circles for many years and was a leading advisor to several Virginia governors. His committee assignments included Rules, Finance, County, City and Town, Organization, Moral Social and Town Welfare. His special committee assignments included the Denny Commission, which paved the way for improving the state's school system; the Commission to Study the Home for Needy Confederate Women, and the Virginia Advisory Legislative Council.

=== Perrow Commission ===
After a three-judge federal court and the Virginia Supreme Court both ruled on January 19, 1959, that Virginia's school-closing laws (part of the Stanley Plan to block school desegregation) were unconstitutional under both the federal and state constitutions, Governor J. Lindsay Almond initially vowed to continue Massive Resistance, but soon decided not to defy the courts but instead limit the degree of integration. He thus appointed Perrow chairman of the Virginia School Commission which became known as the "Perrow Commission". Although powerful Senator Harry F. Byrd was stunned and would not admit defeat, attorney general Albertis Harrison defended the governor's shift toward accommodation. Moreover, the Perrow Commission included four members from each congressional district, unlike the earlier Gray Commission which was weighted toward Southside Virginia.

The Commission received more than five hundred petitions signed by over twenty-five thousand people from every section of the Commonwealth protesting integration and several members of the Commission were staunch segregationists. Perrow was not among them, but needed their support in order to succeed where previous commission had failed—namely keeping public schools open in Virginia and moving past this divisive period in Virginia's history. Setting aside the many Dissenting Opinions in the Report, even the Concurring Statements show just how engrained segregation was at the time in the minds of many of the men who served in the Senate and on the Commission whose votes were required to end Massive Resistance. Accordingly, while the recommended changes to legislation and Virginia Constitution make it clear that the primary objectives of the Perrow Report recommendations were to keep public schools open and end Massive Resistance—which when adopted, the amendments achieved on both accounts—the Perrow Commission Report includes painful compromise language that "The Commission is opposed to integration and offers the program set out herein because it thinks it is the best that can be devised at this time to avoid integration and preserve our public schools."

The Commission also considered a "Pupil Preference Plan" that, "in addition to the operation of public schools open to the admission of children of both races, public schools would be operated for the children of each race whose parents object to sending their children to mixed schools." The Commission rejected the Pupil Preference Plan, opting instead for integrated school and a local option where communities could choose to provide tuition grants for children whose parents did not want them to go to integrated schools, effectively ending massive resistance and paving the way for integrated education in Virginia. On the eve of the senate's vote on adopting the recommendations of the Perrow Commission's report, five thousand people (mostly from Southside Virginia) gathered in Richmond's Capital Square, condemning Governor Almond and Lieutenant Governor Stephens for their support of the Perrow Commission's recommendations and for betraying the Massive Resistance movement. Former Perrow Commission member George M. Cochran later recalled how, after four hours of debate, the House approved the House bill reported from the Education Committee 54 to 45, leading to final passage 54 to 46. On the Senate side, an anti-Perrow Commission majority controlled the Senate Education Committee, so Almond's allies employed a parliamentary device to permit the entire Senate rather than just that small committee to vote on the pupil assignment bill. To break a deadlocked Senate, however, supporters needed the tie-breaking vote of Senator Stuart B. Carter of Fincastle in Botetourt County. Carter had opposed the tuition assistance aspects of the Gray plan, but had recently undergone major surgery. Undeterred, the pro-Perrow faction found Carter and wheeled him into the Senate chamber to cast the decisive favorable vote. The bill passed 20 to 19. The following day, on the same 20 to 19 vote, the Senate approved the local pupil assignment bill.

The 1959 special session established a permanent fissure in the Byrd Organization, "embittering old friends toward one another." The senate's passage of the "local option" put an end to Massive Resistance, which now seems inevitable, but at the time was supported by powerful political and social leaders. Perrow paid a political price. He lost his support within the Byrd Organization, which defeated him in the 1963 Democratic primary needed for reelection. Perrow was later appointed president of the Virginia State Board of Education.

=== I-64 ===
Perrow fought to reroute the long-planned interstate highway now known as I-64 between Clifton Forge and Richmond from its "northern route" through Charlottesville to a "southern route" that would include Lynchburg. Since the 1940s, maps of the federal interstate highway system depicted the interstate taking a northern route, but Virginia had received assurances from the federal government that the final location of the route would be decided by the state.

The proposed southern route called for the interstate to follow from Richmond via US-360 and US-460, through Lynchburg to Roanoke and US-220 from Roanoke to Clifton Forge. Accordingly, the southern route would have supported a greater percentage of Virginia's manufacturing and textile centers at that time. In 1959, a report championed by Perrow succeeded in persuading a majority of Virginia Highway Commissioners to support the southern route. In a surprise defeat for both Perrow and Lynchburg, however, both Governor Almond Jr. and U.S. Secretary of Commerce Luther H. Hodges, Sr. announced in July 1961 that the route would not be changed from the originally-proposed northern route.

=== Re-election defeat ===
In 1963, B.F. Dodson defeated Perrow in the Democratic primary, but was in turn defeated by Republican Robert S. Burruss Jr. in the general election. Thus, Burruss succeeded Perrow. However, the redistricting in 1965 meant that Lynchburg no longer was in state senate District 12 with Campbell County, but in District 11 with Bedford and Amherst Counties, which re-elected Burruss.

== Roots ==
Perrow's family was French Huguenot, and came to the American Colonies from England in 1707, settling in Old Manakin near Richmond. Perrow was the great grandson of Captain William C. Perrow of Campbell County, Virginia, who served in the Mexican–American War, and the grandson of Fletcher C. Perrow who served in the Civil War in Company G 2nd Virginia Cavalry. Three of Fletcher's four brothers also fought for the Confederacy: Alexander Perrow, Stephen Perrow who rode with Col. John S. Mosby's Rangers, and Willis Perrow who was a courier for General Robert E. Lee at the age of fourteen. Perrow's father Dr. Mosby G. Perrow (1876–1943) was Director of Public Health and Welfare for the City of Lynchburg.

== Death and legacy ==
Perrow died in 1973 at a Lynchburg hospital and was buried at Lynchburg's Spring Hill cemetery. The University of Virginia holds his papers at the Albert and Shirley Small Special Collections Library.
