= Vernon C. Smith =

American politician (1892–1963)

Member of the Virginia House of Delegates from the 9th district
- In office 1950–1961
- Succeeded by: Samuel J. Breeding
- In office 1938–1948

Personal details
- Born: Vernon Corbett Smith; June 28, 1892 Grundy, Virginia, U.S.
- Died: January 27, 1963 (aged 70) Grundy, Virginia, U.S.
- Resting place: Clinch Valley Memorial Cemetery; Richlands, Virginia, U.S.
- Party: Democratic
- Spouse: Margaret Katherine Whitely
- Children: 2
- Occupation: Politician; bank president; businessman

Vernon Corbett Smith (June 28, 1892 – January 27, 1963) was an American politician from Virginia. He served as a member of the Virginia House of Delegates from 1938 to 1948 and from 1950 to 1961.

== Early life ==
Vernon Corbett Smith was born on June 28, 1892, in Grundy, Virginia. He attended Grundy Senior High School.

== Career ==
Smith was a Democrat. He served as a member of the Virginia House of Delegates, representing the 9th district, from 1938 to 1948 and from 1950 to 1961. He was defeated for re-election by Samuel J. Breeding. He helped establish Breaks Interstate Park and served on its commission. He was also a member of the Perrow Commission.

Smith was a president of Cumberland Bank & Trust Company. He was an automotive dealer and was president of the Grundy Motor Corporation.

== Personal life ==
Smith married Margaret Katherine Whitley, daughter of Rachel (née Whitten) and Robert Whitley. They had a son, Harold Whitley, and daughter. He was a Mason, Shriner and Presbyterian.

Smith died following a heart attack on January 27, 1963, at his home in Grundy. He was buried in Clinch Valley Memorial Cemetery in Richlands.
