= Donora Hillard =

American educator and author

Donora Shaw
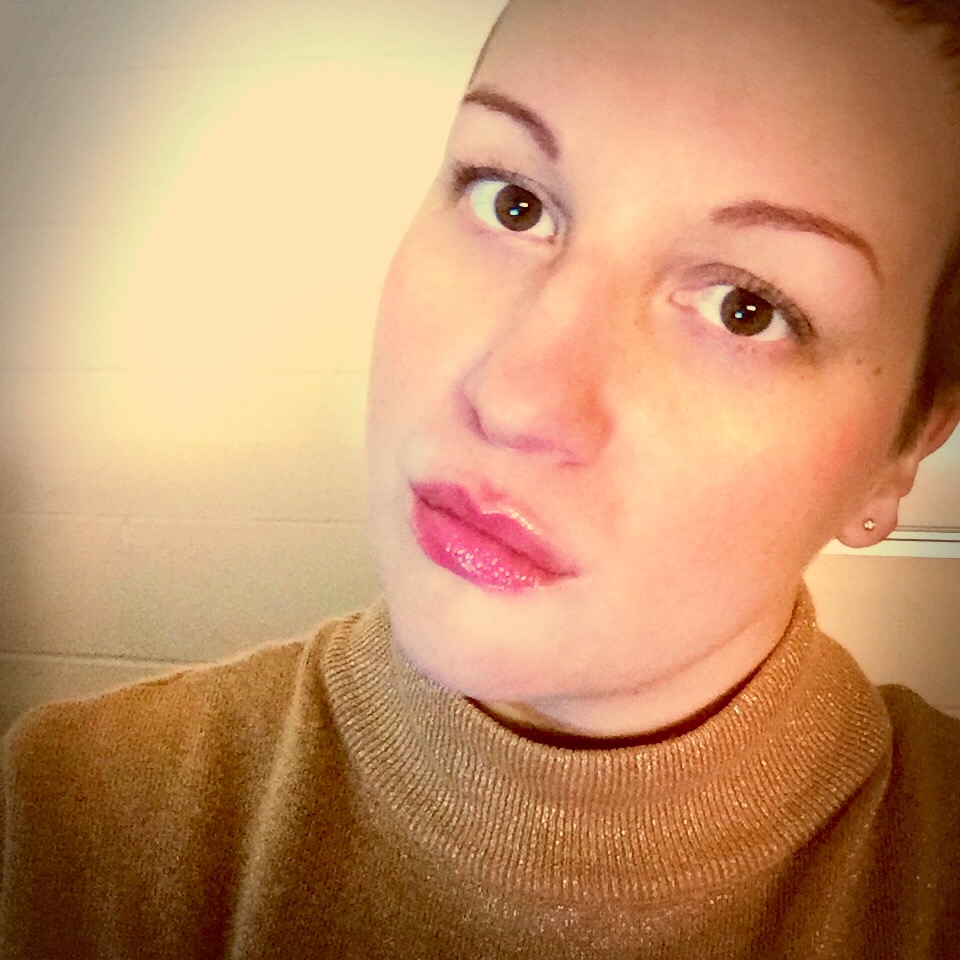
- Education: King's College, Rutgers University-Camden, Wilkes University, Wayne State University
- Occupation: Writer
- Writing career
- Period: 2006 – present

Donora Shaw (née Hillard) is an American writer and educator. She first gained recognition in institutional critique and trauma studies for her debut full-length collection of poetry, published when she was 27 years old. Her projects have appeared on CNN, WBEZ Chicago, and MSNBC.

Shaw is the author of several works of hybrid text, poetry, and theory: Parapherna (2006), Exhibition (2008), Theology of the Body (2010), Covenant (2012), and The Aphasia Poems (2014). In 2015, her play The Plagiarist was produced in conjunction with the National Endowment for the Arts' The Big Read initiative. She has also modeled in book trailers. In 2016, Cobalt Press published her most recent full-length poetry book, Jeff Bridges.

== Early life ==
Shaw was born in Wilkes-Barre, Pennsylvania. "Home for me," Shaw has said of the rural setting of her upbringing, "is being lost in the woods with people telling stories about something terrible all around you." Some of her earliest works of poetry were recognized locally.

Shaw later matriculated at King's College, where she would become President of Sigma Tau Delta, the International English Honor Society, and attain a membership to the Aquinas Society, the King's College honor society.

== Academic career ==
After completing her BA in English from King's College (Pennsylvania) in just under three years, Shaw went on to pursue an MA in creative writing with a fellowship from Rutgers University-Camden. She would later finish that degree and also receive her MFA in creative writing from Wilkes University in 2008.

It was during her tenure as an English instructor at a private Roman Catholic high school near Gettysburg, Pennsylvania, where she had the experiences that would later inform Theology of the Body.

In 2014, while teaching composition and literature at Lawrence Technological University near Detroit, Shaw's work The Aphasia Poems was published by S▲L.

After moving to Northeast Ohio, Shaw completed the requirements for her PhD in English from Wayne State University.

== Personal life ==
Following the sudden and unexpected death of her mother in June 2019, Shaw permanently relocated back to Pennsylvania on July 15, 2019.

She is married to Cameron Shaw, with whom she has two children including an adopted son through marriage.

In January 2021, Shaw announced via her website that she was pregnant for the first time. On July 15, 2021, she gave birth to a daughter, Merrin.

== Selected works ==
- Theology of the Body (Gold Wake Press, 2010; rereleased as Covenant, Gold Wake Press, 2012) is a response, through the fragmentation of form and memory, to the teachings of Pope John Paul II, also published under the same name (Theology of the Body). This work of hybrid text would lead one staff reviewer at Kill Author to claim, "I think Donora Hillard has visionary powers." In summarizing her own belief structure, Shaw has said that it "hinges upon the Gospel of Thomas and the phrase 'Talitha cumi,' which is Aramaic for 'Girl, get up.'"
- The Aphasia Poems (S▲L, 2014) is a collection of poems adapted with permission from Shaw's clients with linguistic disabilities, to whom she was a disability advocate and mentor in Wayne County, Michigan. According to one reviewer, while some writers might be inclined to "speak about or for these individuals, Hillard allows them to speak for themselves."
- Jeff Bridges (Cobalt Press, 2016)

== Bibliography ==
=== Poetry ===
- Parapherna (dancing girl press, 2006)
- Exhibition (Gold Wake Press, 2008)
- Theology of the Body (Gold Wake Press, 2010)
- Covenant (with Zachary C. Bush) (Gold Wake Press, 2012)
- The Aphasia Poems (S▲L, 2014)
- Jeff Bridges (with illustrations by Goodloe Byron) (Cobalt Press, 2016)

=== Play ===
- The Plagiarist (2015)

=== Articles ===
- "'But this is a world': Alzheimer’s writing and punk pedagogy" (Lybba, 2012)
- "Interfaces and Infrastructures: Examining New Media Objects in the English Studies Classroom" (Pedagogy, 2012)

=== Anthologies ===
- Best of the Web (Dzanc Books, 2010)
- Hint Fiction (W. W. Norton & Company, 2010)
- Service-Learning and Writing: Paving the Way for Literacy(ies) through Community Engagement (Studies in Writing) (BRILL, 2012)
- Women in Clothes (Penguin Random House, 2014)

== Awards and recognition ==
- 2010 – "Departure" was included in Norton's first anthology of hint fiction.
