= Herbert B. Gregory =

American judge (1884–1951)

- Born: Hebert Bailey Gregory; April 10, 1884; Westmoreland County, Virginia, U.S.
- Died: March 9, 1951 (aged 66); Roanoke, Virginia, U.S.
- Resting place: Fairview Cemetery
- Education: Washington and Lee University (LLB)
- Occupations: Politician; lawyer; judge
- Spouse: Margaret Kossen
- Children: 3, including Kossen

Herbert Bailey Gregory (April 10, 1884 – March 9, 1951) was an associate justice of the Supreme Court of Appeals of Virginia from 1930 until his death in 1951.

== Early life ==
Herbert Bailey Gregory was born on April 10, 1884, in Westmoreland County, Virginia to Sallie James (née Payne) and Werter Hancock Gregory. His father was a Methodist Episcopal minister. He was raised in Eastern Virginia and received his early education in private schools, later attending Randolph Macon Academy at Bedford, Virginia and Pungoteague Academy in Accomack County, Virginia. In 1909, he entered Washington and Lee University where he graduated in 1911 with a Bachelor of Laws. He was a member of Phi Beta Kappa and Omicron Delta Kappa.

== Career ==
After graduation, he was admitted to the bar and began practice in Roanoke, Virginia. In 1923, he was appointed judge of the Twentieth Judicial Circuit, succeeding W. W. Moffett. In 1926, he became judge of the Court of Law and Chancery of the City of Roanoke. Judge Gregory served on that court until he was elected, in 1930, to the Supreme Court of Appeals of Virginia, where he remained until his death. He was succeeded on the court by Kennon C. Whittle.

== Personal life ==
Gregory married Margaret Kossen. They had two sons and a daughter, Kossen, James B. and Mrs. Albert Eagler. His son Kossen was a Virginia state delegate.

Gregory died of coronary thrombosis on March 9, 1951, at his home in Roanoke. He was buried in Fairview Cemetery.

== Awards ==
Gregory received an honorary Doctor of Laws from Washington and Lee.
