= Jim Olin =

American politician

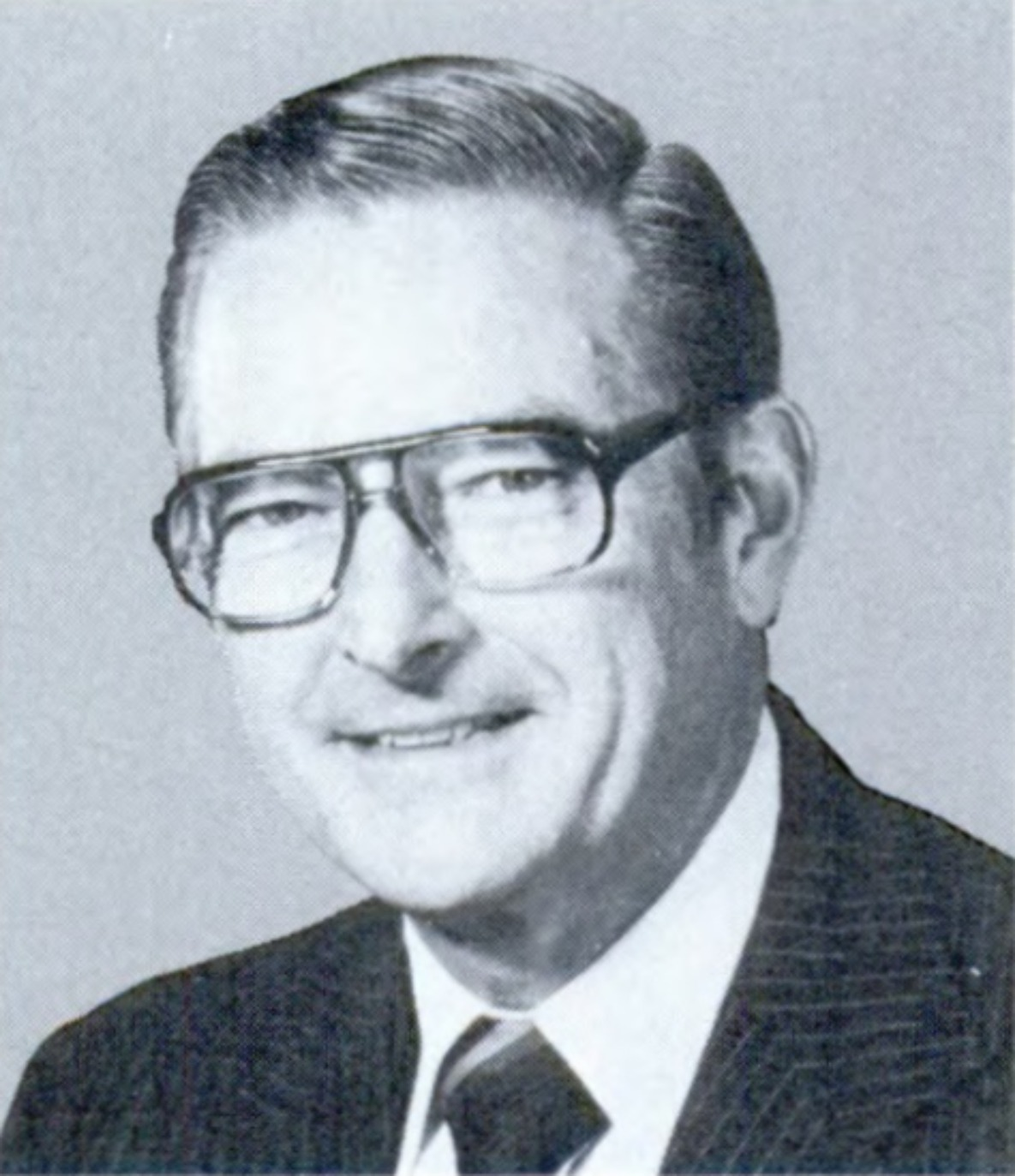

Member of the U.S. House of Representatives from Virginia's 6th district
- In office January 3, 1983 – January 3, 1993
- Preceded by: M. Caldwell Butler
- Succeeded by: Bob Goodlatte

Personal details
- Born: James Randolph Olin; February 28, 1920 Chicago, Illinois, U.S.
- Died: July 29, 2006 (aged 86) Charlottesville, Virginia, U.S.
- Party: Democratic
- Spouse: Phyllis Avery
- Children: 5
- Education: Deep Springs College; Cornell University (BEng)
- Profession: Businessman

Military service
- Allegiance: United States
- Branch/service: United States Army
- Years of service: 1943–1946
- Unit: Signal Corps
- Battles/wars: World War II

James Randolph Olin (February 28, 1920 – July 29, 2006) was an American politician from the U.S. state of Virginia. From 1983 to 1993, Olin, a Democrat, served in the United States House of Representatives for Virginia's 6th congressional district.

== Early life and education ==
Olin was born in Chicago, Illinois, the grandson of Swedish immigrants, and raised in Kenilworth, Illinois. He attended Deep Springs College, before moving on to Cornell University, from which he earned an electrical engineering degree in 1943. Then, until 1946, Olin served in the Signal Corps of the United States Army.

== Politics ==
Olin, a Democrat, made his first bid for political office in 1953, when he became Rotterdam, New York supervisor and served on the Schenectady County board of supervisors. For 35 years until retiring in January 1982, Olin worked in General Electric (GE) as corporate vice president and general manager of industrial electronics. Over the years, Olin's job at GE took him to Schenectady, Erie, Pennsylvania, and Salem, Virginia.

In 1982, Olin was elected to represent the 6th district of Virginia in the U.S. House of Representatives, becoming the first Democrat to hold this seat since 1953. The 6th, stretching from Roanoke through the Shenandoah Valley, had been one of the first areas of Virginia to turn Republican. The district's six-term Republican incumbent, M. Caldwell Butler, hadn't even faced major-party opposition since 1974. However, Olin won a narrow victory.

Over the next two years, Olin worked this vast district well, and held onto his seat in 1984 even as Ronald Reagan carried the district in a landslide. He would never face another close race again, easily defeating Republican challengers in 1986 and 1988 and only facing an independent in 1990.

While in the House, Olin was considered to be a moderate member of the state's delegation. In 1990, he was one of the only three Democrats in the House to vote against Americans with Disabilities Act of 1990. That same year, he clashed with President George H. W. Bush over his budget proposals. As a member of the United States House Committee on Agriculture, Olin advocated reducing milk price subsidies. In 1991, he opposed the Persian Gulf War.

Olin did not run for a sixth term in 1992. That same year he received an honorary LLD from Washington and Lee University. His preferred choice to replace him as the Democratic nominee lost at the district convention to Stephen Musselwhite, who was then handily defeated by Republican Bob Goodlatte, a former aide to Butler. Proving just how Republican this district was, no Democrat after Olin crossed the 40 percent mark in the district, until Beth Macy in 2026.

He died at age 86 in Charlottesville, Virginia.

=== Electoral history ===
- 1982: elected to the U.S. House of Representatives with 51% of the vote, defeating Republican Kevin Grey Miller
- 1984: re-elected with 54% of the vote, defeating Republican Ray L. Garland
- 1986: re-elected with 70% of the vote, defeating Republican Flo Neher Traywick
- 1988: re-elected with 64% of the vote, defeating Republican Charles E. Judd
- 1990: re-elected with 84% of the vote, defeating Independent Gerald E. Berg

== Personal life ==
Olin married Phyllis Olin and had five children with her: Richard, Thomas, Kathy (Milliken), James, and Trina (Santry). The Olin family settled in Roanoke, Virginia in 1968 and relocated to Charlottesville, Virginia in 2003. Jim and Phyllis Olin had eleven grandchildren: Jennifer Milliken Bartlett, Marc Dentico-Olin, Scott Milliken, Julia Milliken, John Olin, Chad Olin, Christine Milliken, Hannah Olin, Arthur Santry IV, Alexa Santry, and Richard Santry. They also had two great-grandsons: Aidan Bartlett and Nathan Bartlett as of 2012.

U.S. House of Representatives
Preceded by M. Caldwell Butler	Member of the U.S. House of Representatives from Virginia's 6th congressional district 1983–1993	Succeeded by Bob Goodlatte
