= Earle M. Brown =

American politician

Member of the Virginia House of Delegates from the Amherst County, Virginia district
- In office January 11, 1956 – January 10, 1965
- Preceded by: Harold B. Singleton
- Succeeded by: Donald G. Pendleton

Personal details
- Born: Earl Marshall Brown; February 14, 1926 Amherst County, Virginia, U.S.
- Died: September 10, 1969 (aged 43) Amherst County, Virginia, U.S.
- Resting place: Amherst cemetery
- Party: Democratic
- Spouse: Mary Elizabeth Jamerson
- Education: Washington and Lee University School of Law
- Occupation: lawyer, politician

Military service
- Allegiance: United States
- Branch/service: U.S. Navy
- Battles/wars: Pacific Theatre

Earle Marshall Brown (February 14, 1926 – September 10, 1969) was a Virginia lawyer and nine-year member of the Virginia House of Delegates representing Amherst County.

== Early and family life ==
Earle Brown was born on February 14, 1926, at Pleasant View, Amherst County, Virginia, to farmer Eddie Brown and his wife Alma Belle Foster. He had a brother and sister and attended local schools, including Pleasant View High School and Lynchburg College.

During World War II, Brown served in the U.S. Navy in the Pacific Theater.

He then attended and graduated from the Washington and Lee University School of Law.

Earle Brown married schoolteacher Mary Elizabeth Jamerson of Bedford County, Virginia, in 1952, and they lived in Madison Heights. Brown was active in his church, Kiwanis, and Ruritans. He was also active in the local Democratic Party.

== Career ==
After admission to the Virginia bar, Brown practiced law in Lynchburg, Virginia, and nearby counties. In 1955, he was elected as a Democrat to the Virginia General Assembly to represent Amherst County and Lynchburg (part-time) during Massive Resistance crisis. He was re-elected several times and served until 1965, declaring in April 1965 that he would not run for re-election. When house districts were numbered beginning in 1962, his district became the 8th. Brown succeeded fellow lawyer and Democrat Harold B. Singleton and was succeeded by fellow lawyer and Democrat Donald G. Pendleton.

== Death ==
Brown died of cancer on September 10, 1969.
