= Harry B. Davis =

American politician (1893–1987)

- In office 1934–1959

Personal details
- Born: July 24, 1893 Princess Anne County, Virginia, U.S.
- Died: July 18, 1987 (aged 93)
- Education: Hampden–Sydney College; Norfolk College
- Occupation: Politician; farmer; businessman

Harry B. Davis (July 24, 1893 – July 18, 1987) was an American politician from Virginia. He served in the Virginia House of Delegates from 1934 to 1959.

== Early life ==
Harry B. Davis was born on July 24, 1893, in Princess Anne County, Virginia, to Ida (née Fisk) and Samuel Jefferson Davis. He studied at Norfolk Academy and Hampden-Sydney College. He also studied law at Norfolk College (later Old Dominion University).

== Career ==
Davis was a farmer. He organized and served as president of the Truckers Cold Storage Corporation around 1928.

Davis defeated F. O. Gaither in 1933 to serve in the Virginia House of Delegates. He served from 1934 to 1959.

== Personal life ==
Davis was a Baptist. He died on July 18, 1987.
