= Sigma Tau Delta =

Student honor society

- ΣΤΔ
- Founded: December 12, 1922; 103 years ago Dakota Wesleyan University
- Type: Honor
- Affiliation: ACHS
- Status: Active
- Emphasis: English
- Scope: International
- Motto: "Sincerity, Truth, Design"
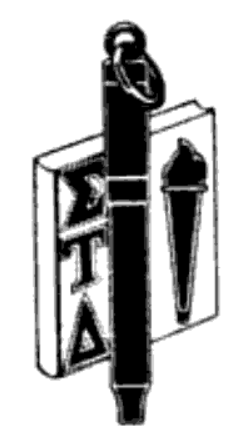
- Member badge
- Colors: Cardinal and Black
- Flower: Red Rose
- Publication: The Rectangle; Sigma Tau Delta Review
- Chapters: 850
- Members: 9,000 active
- Headquarters: c/o Sigma Tau Delta; Department of English; Northern Illinois University; DeKalb, Illinois 60115-2863; United States
- Website: www.english.org

Sigma Tau Delta (ΣΤΔ) is a US-based, international honor society for students of English at four-year colleges and universities who are within the top 30% of their class and have a 3.5 GPA or higher. It presently has over 770 chapters in the United States and abroad. The organization inducts over 7500 new members annually, and is the largest honors organization in its field.

Sigma Tau Delta's central purpose is to confer distinction for high achievement in English language, literature, and writing, and the organization is dedicated to fostering literacy and all aspects of the discipline of English. The Society offers its members tens of thousands of dollars in scholarships, internships, grants, and awards, as well as publication opportunities in its journals The Rectangle and The Sigma Tau Delta Review. Annually the Society provides an international convention, where over 1,000 students and faculty participate in scholarly and creative paper presentations, workshops, and roundtables, and hear featured speakers such as Ursula K. Le Guin, Neil Gaiman, and Poets Laureate Kay Ryan and Natasha Trethewey.

Sigma Tau Delta also sponsors the National English Honor Society (NEHS), currently with over 600 chapters, which serves students and faculty in high schools throughout the U.S. and abroad.

== History ==
Sigma Tau Delta was founded on December 12, 1922 as the English Club of Dakota Wesleyan University in Mitchell, South Dakota. Its founders were professors Judson Quincy Owen of Dakota Wesleyan University, Frederic Fadner of Lombard College, and P. C. Sommerville of Dakota Wesleyan. In preparation for expansion as a national organization, Owen developed a national constitution and Fadner created its ritual.

The nascent society adopted its current name in May 1, 1924, soon holding its first convention on April 3, 1925 – April 4, 1925. At this first convention the first twelve chapters were installed, the insignia and regalia was formally adopted, and the society's publication, The Rectangle was established.

Sigma Tau Delta joined the Association of College Honor Societies in 1972. By 2011, it had grown to 812 active chapters and 9,000 active members.

Literary honor society Lambda Iota Tau went dormant in 2016–2017, with many members joining Sigma Tau Delta. As of 2024, the society has chartered 850 chapters.

== Symbols ==
Sigma Tau Delta's motto is "Sincerity, Trust, Design". Its insignia is a gold key. Its colors are cardinal and black. Its flower is the red rose. Its publications are The Rectangle and Sigma Tau Delta Review.

== Governance ==
Sigma Tau Delta is divided into six regions. Each region has three elected regional officials: a Regent, a Student Representative, and an Associate Student Representative.

The regents are voting members of the board of directors, which also includes the society president, immediate past president, vice-president/president-elect, historian, treasurer, and two student advisors. Serving the board of directors in a non-voting capacity are the executive director, director of communications and chapter development, editor of publications, student representatives, alumni representative, web facilitators, business manager, project coordinator, and NEHS director.

The society's central office is located at Northern Illinois University in DeKalb, Illinois.

== Membership ==
Student membership is available to students currently enrolled in four-year colleges and universities that have active chapters; applications are submitted through the student's local chapter. Candidates for undergraduate membership must have completed at least three semesters or five-quarters of college work and a minimum of two college courses in English language or literature beyond the usual requirements in freshman English. They must also have a minimum of a B or equivalent grade point average in English and must rank at least in the highest 35 percent of their class in general scholarship. (Local chapters may raise, but not lower, these criteria.) Candidates for graduate membership must be enrolled in a graduate program in English or one of its specializations, have completed six semester hours of graduate work or the equivalent, and have a minimum grade point average of 3.3 on a 4.0 scale.

== Conventions ==
The Society organizes a convention every year in March, at which members present original fiction, poetry, critical essays, and personal non-fiction. Workshops and roundtable discussions are presented by members and guest experts. Attendees also hear keynote presentations and readings and attend workshops, Q&A sessions, and book signings by featured speakers such as Ursula K. Le Guin, Neil Gaiman, and Poets Laureate Kay Ryan and Natasha Trethewey.

Recent international conventions have been held in St. Louis, MO (2010), Pittsburgh, PA (2011), New Orleans, LA (2012), Portland, OR (2013), Savannah, GA (2014), Albuquerque, NM (2015), Minneapolis, MN (2016), Louisville, KY (2017), Cincinnati, OH (2018), and St. Louis, MO (2019). At the 2013 Convention in Portland, nearly 550 papers were presented and over $10,000 was awarded for student works presented at the convention. Another $60,000+ was awarded for various other scholarships and writing awards. This year's convention location is Las Vegas, NV (March 25–28, 2020).

== National English Honor Society (NEHS) ==
The National English Honor Society (NEHS) is sponsored by Sigma Tau Delta. The National English Honor Society is the honor society for secondary school students excelling in the study of English Language & Literature, Creative Writing, Drama & Theater, Film & Media Studies, and Student Journalism.

NEHS works with over 80,000 students worldwide each year, making it one of the largest secondary school honor societies in the world. It has a network of over 1,200 schools and 1,600 educators on six continents. NEHS is affiliated with Sigma Tau Delta (the four-year university English honor society) and Sigma Kappa Delta (the two-year college English honor society).

NEHS awards over US$70,000 in scholarships annually.

== Chapters ==
It presently has over 770 chapters in the United States and abroad.

== Notable members ==
- Jerry Bradley, poet and university professor
- Kevin Brown, poet and teacher
- A. D. Coleman, critic, historian, educator, and curator of photography and photo-based art
- Bill Courtney, high school football coach
- Jennifer Decker, Kentucky House of Representatives
- Elizabeth Donald, writer
- Rodger Dean Duncan, author and business consultant
- Cindy Elavsky, journalist
- W. Ralph Eubanks, writer and professor
- Gloria Gaither, Christian singer-songwriter
- Donora Hillard, educator and author
- Barbara Holdridge, co-founder of Caedmon Records
- Brittani Kline, fashion model
- John O. Moseley, professor of Latin at the University of Oklahoma
- Maurice J. O'Sullivan, professor of literature at Rollins College
- Aimee Parkison, writer
- Harold B. Singleton, Virginia House of Delegates
- Terence Yung, classical pianist

== See also ==
- Honor cords
