= Lambda Iota Tau =

American honor society in literature

- ΛΙΤ
- Founded: December 3, 1953; 72 years ago Michigan State University
- Type: Honor
- Former affiliation: ACHS
- Status: Merged
- Merge date: 2016
- Successor: Sigma Tau Delta
- Emphasis: Literature
- Scope: International
- Motto: Λόγος ἰδέαν τέλει Logos idean telei "The word gives form to the idea."
- Member badge
- Colors: Purple and Gold
- Flower: Pansy
- Publication: LIT Journal; LIT Newsletter
- Chapters: 103+
- Members: 40,000+ lifetime
- Nickname: LIT
- Headquarters: United States

Lambda Iota Tau (ΛΙΤ) was an international honor society for literature, whose purpose was to recognize and promote excellence in the study of literature in all languages. It was founded at Michigan State University in 1953. The society was admitted to the Association of College Honor Societies in 1965. It was absorbed by Sigma Tau Delta in 2016-2017.

== History ==
Lambda Iota Tau was founded by Dr. Warren L. Fleischauer at Michigan State University on December 3, 1953. Its purpose was to "recognize and promote excellence in the study of literature of all languages". A second chapter, Beta, was chartered at Aquinas College, followed by Gamma at University of Sioux Falls.

More than twenty chapters were chartered in 1954. Lambda Iota Tau was incorporated on March 6, 1954. Fleischauer was its first executive secretary. Robert Wells, a student at Purdue University, was elected its first national president. Its headquarters were at Michigan State College.

Lambda Iota Tau became an international society in 1960 with the chartering of Its first chapter outside of the United States. It joined the Association for College Honor Societies in 1965. By 1972, it had 82 chapters and 2,500 active members. It 30,000 member and 102 active chapters, three colonies, and one inactive chapter in 1992. By 2013, the society's active chapters were reduced to 46, with 40,000 total members.

Lambda Iota Tau dissolved in 2016 and was absorbed by Sigma Tau Delta. Sigma Tau Delta accepted the society's members and agreed to "memorialize the society in some way." Lambda Iota Tau turned over its remaining $35,000 in assets to Sigma Tau Delta.

== Symbols ==
Lamba Iota Tau's motto was Λόγος ἰδέαν τέλει or Logos idean telei or "The word gives form to the idea." Its badge was a six-sided shield, with slightly convex edges. It was black enamel with a wide gold border and featured and the Greek letters ΛΙΤ, placed vertically.

Its colors were purple and gold; purple represented literature's magnificence and gold symbolized what poet John Keats called the "realms of gold" where literature takes its readers. The society's flower was the pansy, which was supposed to represent thought.

Its publications were LIT Journal, LIT Newsletter, and The Lambdan annual newsletter for alumni. Its nickname was LIT.

== Activities ==
Lambda Iota Tau held regional conferences. It published LIT Journal annually, with members' analysis, essays, poems, and short stories; the best piece in each category received a publication prize. The society also published a semiannual LIT Newsletter. Each year, the national society awarded several scholarships to its members.

The international society sponsored lectures by individuals such as poet Richard Eberhart, poet Robert Lowell, and writer John Crowe Ransom. Chapters were encouraged to hold regular meetings and to sponsor events and activities that would bring the study of literature to the attention of the campus at large. These include book sales, bringing speakers to campus, showing films based on literature, and library exhibits. Some chapters volunteered for local Habitat for Humanity projects and various local literacy projects.

== Governance ==
Lambda Iota Tau was a nonprofit organization. An International Board of Moderators oversaw it Its elected officers were an international executive secretary, an international assistant executive secretary, a treasurer, and one chapter representative from five geographical regions.

== Membership ==
Membership into Lambda Iota Tau was open to juniors, seniors, and graduate students majoring or minoring in literature. Undergraduates needed a B average in twelve semester hours of literature-related coursework; graduates needed an A average in one semester. Before joining, initiates were required to write and present a paper on literature or a creative work such as a short story, essay, poem, or drama. Collegiate members were considered active members who became alumni members after graduation.

The International Board of Moderators awarded honorary memberships for contributions to literature, language, or linguistics, or proficiency in teaching, scholarship, criticism, or creative writing. The society also bestowed an honorary presidency on literary figures for distinction in critical and creative writing. Honorary presidents included W. H. Auden, Saul Bellow, Archibald MacLeish, Joyce Carol Oates, and Robert Penn Warren.

== See also ==
- Honor cords
