= The News & Advance =

Newspaper in Lynchburg, Virginia

- Type: Daily newspaper
- Format: Broadsheet
- Owner: Lee Enterprises
- Publisher: Kelly Mirt
- Editor: Caroline Glickman
- Founded: January 15, 1866 (The News); 1880 (The Daily Advance); 1986 (merged paper)
- Headquarters: 101 Wyndale Drive; Lynchburg, Virginia 24501
- Country: United States
- Circulation: 9,085 Daily (as of 2023)
- OCLC number: 25499955
- Website: newsadvance.com

The News & Advance is the daily newspaper of record in Lynchburg, Virginia, United States. Its primary circulation area consists of the city of Lynchburg and the surrounding counties of Amherst, Appomattox, Bedford, and Campbell.

The News & Advance is owned by Lee Enterprises. Alton Brown is the publisher. Caroline Glickman is the managing editor. The newspaper uses articles from news services, such as the Associated Press, as well as former Media General-owned news organizations.

The News & Advance added a new printing press in 2009, manufactured by Koenig & Bauer. Its last press was built in 1974, when the newspaper moved to its current building. Prior to 1974, the newspaper's headquarters were in downtown Lynchburg.

== History ==
The News was founded on January 15, 1866 by Robert Enoch Withers, as a morning newspaper, while The Daily Advance was founded in 1880, as an evening newspaper. In 1888, future U. S. Senator Carter Glass bought The News. In 1893, he bought The Daily Advance and merged its business operations with The News, with news and opinion operations remaining separate. The Glass family continued to publish both papers (The News, every morning; The Daily Advance, weekday afternoons) until 1979, when the papers were purchased by Worrell Newspapers Inc., which began publishing a merged edition, The News & Daily Advance, on weekends and holidays, with separate volume and edition numbers. In 1986, separate delivery of the News and Daily Advance was ended, replaced by a seven-day morning paper, The News & Daily Advance. In 1991, "Daily" was dropped from the name and the paper assumed its current title. In 1995, Worrell sold The News & Advance to Media General, which sold most of its newspaper division to Berkshire Hathaway in 2012.

== Sections ==
=== Front and local ===
The News & Advance covers local news of interest to Lynchburg and its surrounding counties, a combined metropolitan area of 261,593 people as of the 2020 census. Topics commonly covered include development in and around the city; higher education, including Liberty University, founded by Jerry Falwell, and Randolph College, nuclear technology, as the city is home to Areva and BWX Technologies; as well as subjects covered by most American newspapers, such as local crime and politics.

=== Sports ===
The News & Advance covers Liberty University sports as well as more than 20 area high schools. It also covers University of Lynchburg, Randolph College, Sweet Briar College and the Lynchburg Hillcats, a minor-league baseball team that serves as a farm team for the Cleveland Guardians.

=== Opinion ===
The opinion section occasionally features commentary from local community leaders. Examples include Virginia Delegate Shannon Valentine and Ken Garren, president of University of Lynchburg.

Columnists regularly carried include liberal investigative columnist Alexander Cockburn and left-of-center political commentator E.J. Dionne. They are complemented on the right by Pulitzer Prize-winning conservative writer Charles Krauthammer and Rich Lowry of National Review. Conservative commentator Cal Thomas has been featured in the section for almost a quarter of a century; he began his career in Lynchburg as a top adviser to Jerry Falwell Sr. and the Moral Majority.

== See also ==
- List of newspapers in Virginia
