= Ken Randall (legal scholar) =

American legal scholar

Dean of the Antonin Scalia Law School
- Incumbent
- Assumed office 2020

Dean of the University of Alabama School of Law
- In office 1993–2013

Personal details
- Born: Kenneth C. Randall; June 13, 1956 (age 69)
- Education: Adelphi University (BA); Hofstra University (JD); Yale University (LLM); Columbia University (LLM, JSD)
- Profession: Legal scholar

Kenneth C. Randall (born June 13, 1956) is an American legal scholar. He has served as dean of the University of Alabama School of Law (1993–2013) and the Antonin Scalia Law School (since 2020).

== Education ==
Randall earned a bachelor's degree at Adelphi University, followed by his Juris Doctor at Hofstra University's Maurice A. Deane School of Law in 1981, where he was editor-in-chief of the Hofstra Law Review. He then practiced law with Simpson Thacher & Bartlett until 1984. During this time, Randall further his legal education with a Master of Laws from Yale Law School, which he completed in 1982, and later earned a second LL.M. and a J.S.D. degree at Columbia Law School, in 1985 and 1988, respectively.

== Academic career ==
Randall began his teaching career at the University of Alabama School of Law in 1985. He was named vice dean in 1989, and became dean in 1993. Randall retired from the University of Alabama in 2013. He then founded iLaw, a distance education company. In 2020, Randall joined the faculty of George Mason University's Antonin Scalia Law School, with appointments as Allison and Dorothy Rouse Dean and George Mason University Foundation Professor of Law.

== Books ==
- Randall, Kenneth C. (1990). Federal Courts in the International Human Rights Paradigm. Duke University Press. ISBN 9780822310389.
