= Ralph Northam =

Governor of Virginia from 2018 to 2022

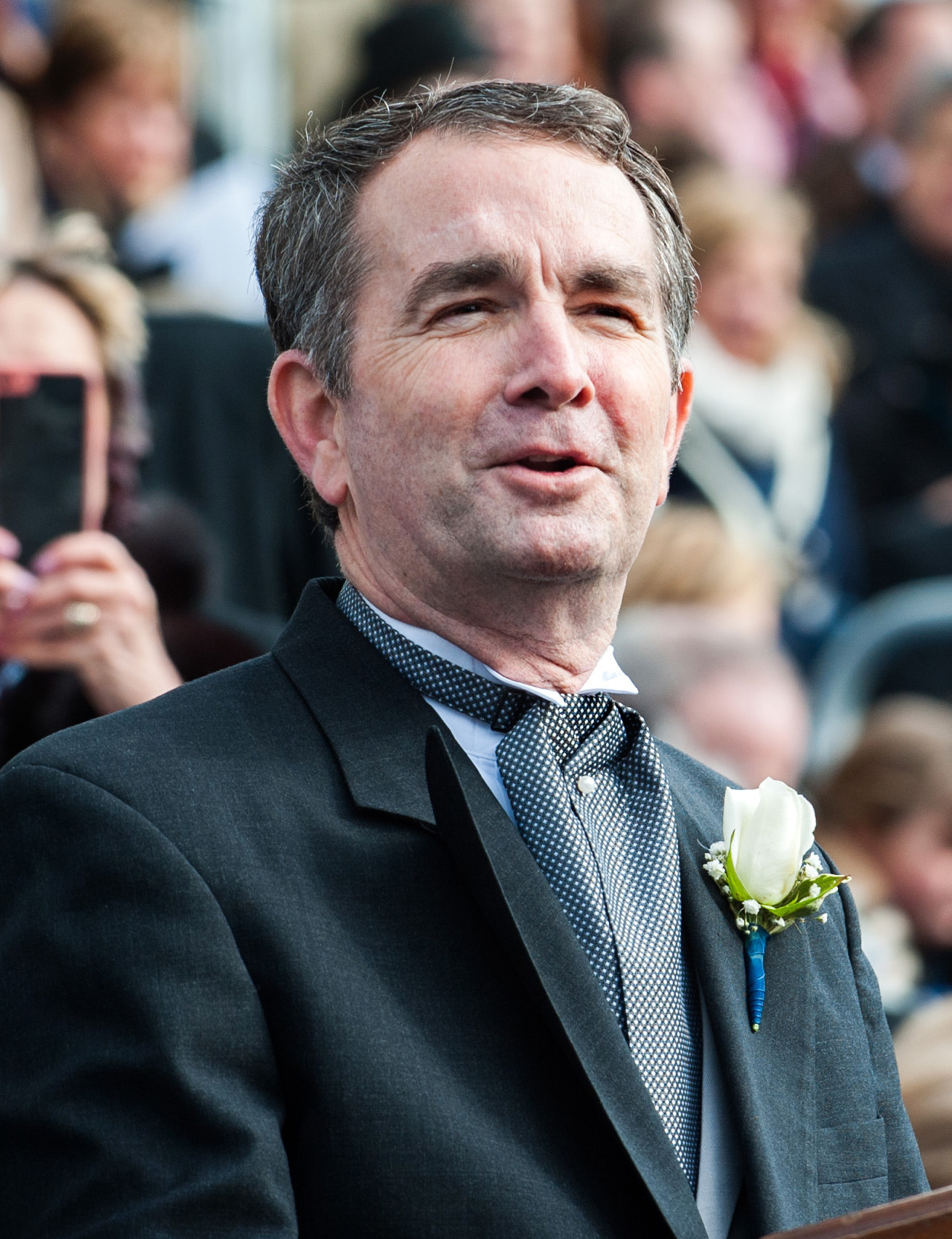
- Northam in 2018

73rd Governor of Virginia
- In office January 13, 2018 – January 15, 2022
- Lieutenant: Justin Fairfax
- Preceded by: Terry McAuliffe
- Succeeded by: Glenn Youngkin

40th Lieutenant Governor of Virginia
- In office January 11, 2014 – January 13, 2018
- Governor: Terry McAuliffe
- Preceded by: Bill Bolling
- Succeeded by: Justin Fairfax

Member of the Virginia Senate from the 6th district
- In office January 9, 2008 – January 11, 2014
- Preceded by: Nick Rerras
- Succeeded by: Lynwood Lewis

Personal details
- Born: Ralph Shearer Northam; September 13, 1959 (age 67) Nassawadox, Virginia, U.S.
- Party: Democratic
- Spouse: Pamela Thomas (m. 1986)
- Children: 2
- Education: Virginia Military Institute (BS); Eastern Virginia Medical School (MD)

Military service
- Allegiance: United States
- Branch/service: United States Army
- Years of service: 1984–1992
- Rank: Major
- Unit: Army Medical Corps

Ralph Shearer Northam (born September 13, 1959) is an American physician and former politician who served as the 73rd governor of Virginia from 2018 to 2022. A pediatric neurologist by occupation, he was an officer in the U.S. Army Medical Corps from 1984 to 1992. A member of the Democratic Party, he served as the 40th lieutenant governor of Virginia from 2014 to 2018 before winning the governorship against the Republican nominee Ed Gillespie in the 2017 election. Prohibited by the Virginia Constitution from running for a consecutive term, Northam left office in January 2022 and was succeeded by Republican Glenn Youngkin.

As governor, Northam's most notable accomplishments included expanding Medicaid coverage as allowed under the Affordable Care Act, abolishing the death penalty, legalizing marijuana, and raising the minimum wage. Northam also led the state during the COVID-19 pandemic, where he was the only governor in the United States who was a licensed doctor. An incident occurred in the 2019 Virginia political crisis, when it was revealed in early 2019 that he had appeared in blackface published in his college yearbooks. Despite the scandal and demands from black leaders to resign, Northam refused to do so and enjoyed wide popularity amongst Virginia voters through the rest of his term in office. Northam's concurrent political "rebirth" was celebrated in the mainstream media.

Northam is currently a neurologist at the Children's Hospital of The King's Daughters in Norfolk where his clinical interests are epilepsy and neuromuscular disorders.

== Early life, family history, and education ==
Northam was born in the town of Nassawadox on Virginia's Eastern Shore on September 13, 1959. He and his older brother of two years, Thomas, were raised on a water-side farm, just outside Onancock, Virginia. The family grew a variety of crops and tended livestock on their seventy-five-acre (30 ha) property. As a teenager, Northam worked on a ferry to Tangier Island and as a deckhand on fishing charters; he also worked on a neighbor's farm and as a "stock boy" at Meatland grocery store. He and Thomas attended desegregated public schools. Northam graduated from Onancock High School, where his class was predominately African American.

Northam's mother, Nancy B. Shearer, was originally from Washington, D.C. She was a part-time nurse at Northampton-Accomack Memorial Hospital, and her father was a surgeon. Nancy Shearer died in 2009. Northam's father, Wescott B. Northam, who died at age 100 in 2025, served in the U.S. Navy during World War II and worked as a lawyer after graduation from the University of Virginia Law School in 1949; he entered politics in the 1960s, serving three terms as Commonwealth's Attorney for Accomack County, Virginia. After losing election to a fourth term, Wescott Northam was appointed as a District Court judge for Accomack and Northampton counties, and occasionally served as a senior judge after his retirement. Wescott Northam's own father, Thomas Long Northam, had served as a circuit judge in the same area.

Thomas Long Northam died when Wescott Northam was only fourteen, and a few years later, the family farm in Modest Town, Virginia, where Wescott had been born, was sold. The farm had first come into the family through Ralph Northam's great-great-grandfather, James, who along with his son, Levi Jacob, had owned slaves – one of whom, Raymond Northam, was freed to enlist in the 9th Regiment of Colored Troops (Union Army, Civil War). Ralph Northam was unaware of his family's slave-owning history until his father conducted research into their ancestry during the time of Northam's gubernatorial campaign. Upon learning about this part of his family's history, Northam said, "The news that my ancestors owned slaves disturbs and saddens me, but the topic of slavery has always bothered me. My family's complicated story is similar to Virginia's complex history. We're a progressive state, but we once had the largest number of slaves in the union."

In high school, Northam was voted "Most Likely to Succeed" and graduated as salutatorian. He was a member of his school's basketball and baseball teams. Northam graduated from the Virginia Military Institute (VMI) in 1981, where he served as president of VMI's honor court and received a bachelor's degree in biology. He became only the second Governor of Virginia to have graduated from VMI, the first since Westmoreland Davis (class of 1877, elected governor in 1917).

Northam went on to Eastern Virginia Medical School, earning his Doctor of Medicine in 1984.

== U.S. Army and medical career ==
From 1984 to 1992 he served as a United States Army medical officer. During his Army service, he completed a pediatric residency at Brooke Army Medical Center in San Antonio, Texas, followed by a child neurology fellowship at Walter Reed Army Medical Center in Washington, D.C., and Johns Hopkins Hospital in Baltimore, Maryland. During Operation Desert Storm, he treated evacuated casualties at Landstuhl Regional Medical Center in Germany.

Northam was discharged from the U.S. Army in 1992 at the rank of major, after having completed eight years of service. Since 1992, Northam has been a pediatric neurologist at Children's Hospital of the King's Daughters in Norfolk, Virginia.

== Early political career ==
Prior to entering politics, Northam voted for Republican George W. Bush in the 2000 and 2004 presidential elections, a fact that opponents raised in later Democratic primaries. Northam says that he was apolitical at the time and regretted those votes, saying: "Politically, there was no question, I was underinformed."

=== Senate of Virginia (2008–2014) ===
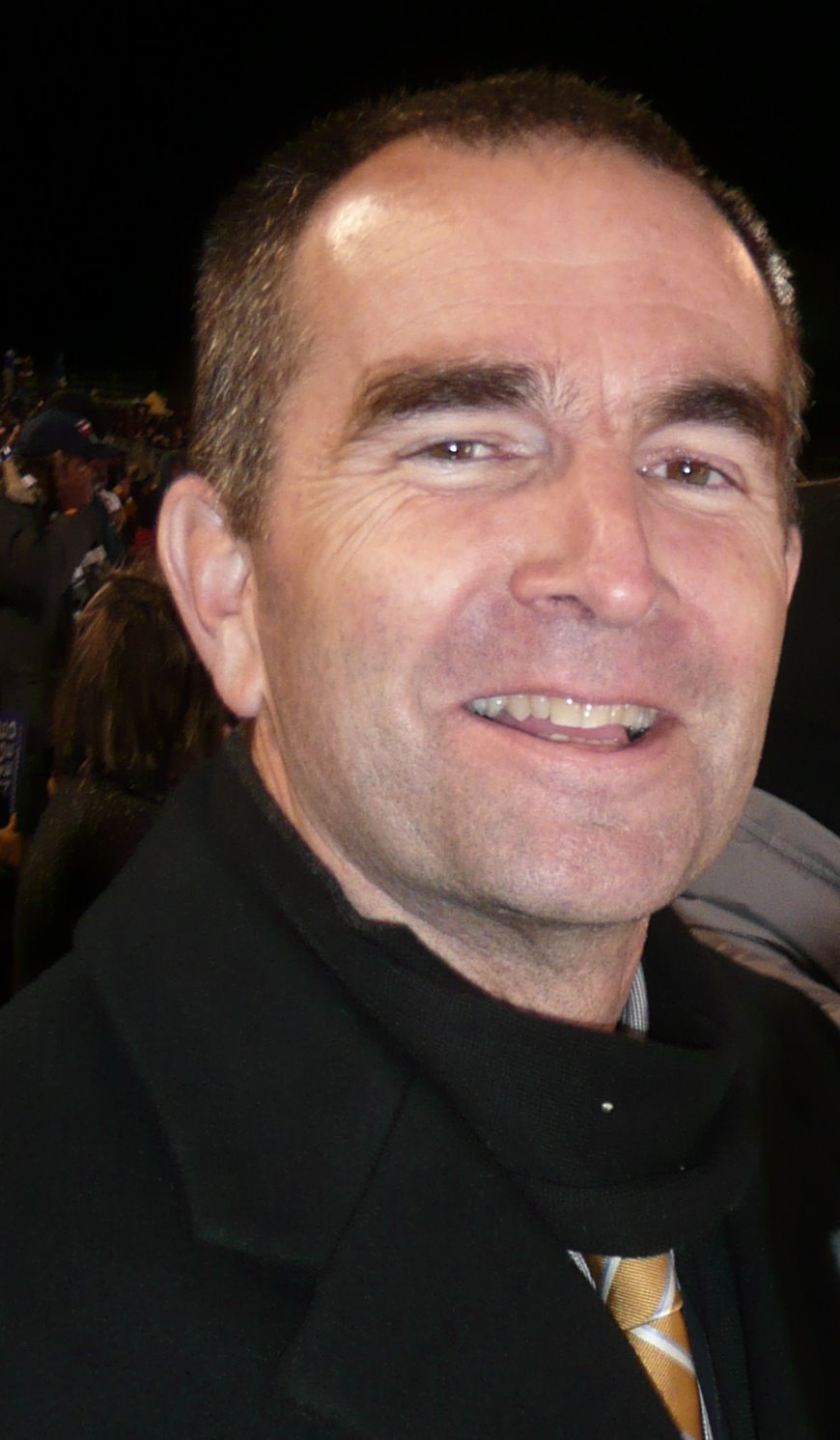
Northam in 2008

Northam first ran for office in 2007 in the 6th Senate district, which includes the Eastern Shore of Virginia; Mathews County, on the Middle Peninsula; and parts of the cities of Norfolk and Virginia Beach. He was unopposed for the Democratic nomination. On November 6, 2007, he defeated Nick Rerras, a two-term Republican incumbent, 17,307 votes to 14,499.

He was re-elected in November 2011, defeating Ben Loyola Jr., a defense contractor, 16,606 votes to 12,622.

One of Northam's first major activities as a state legislator was to lead an effort to pass a ban on smoking in restaurants in Virginia. The bill failed the first time, but it passed the next year and Governor Tim Kaine signed it into law.

In 2009, Northam – a self-described "conservative on fiscal issues and liberal on social issues" – was the subject of an attempt by state Senate Republicans to get him to switch parties. This action would have given Republicans control of the State Senate, but after news of the imminent switch broke on Twitter, Democrats held a closed-door meeting, and Northam reiterated that he was not leaving the party. He later said, "I guess it's nice to be wanted, but I'm a Democrat, and that's where I'm staying."

=== Lieutenant Governor of Virginia (2014–2018) ===
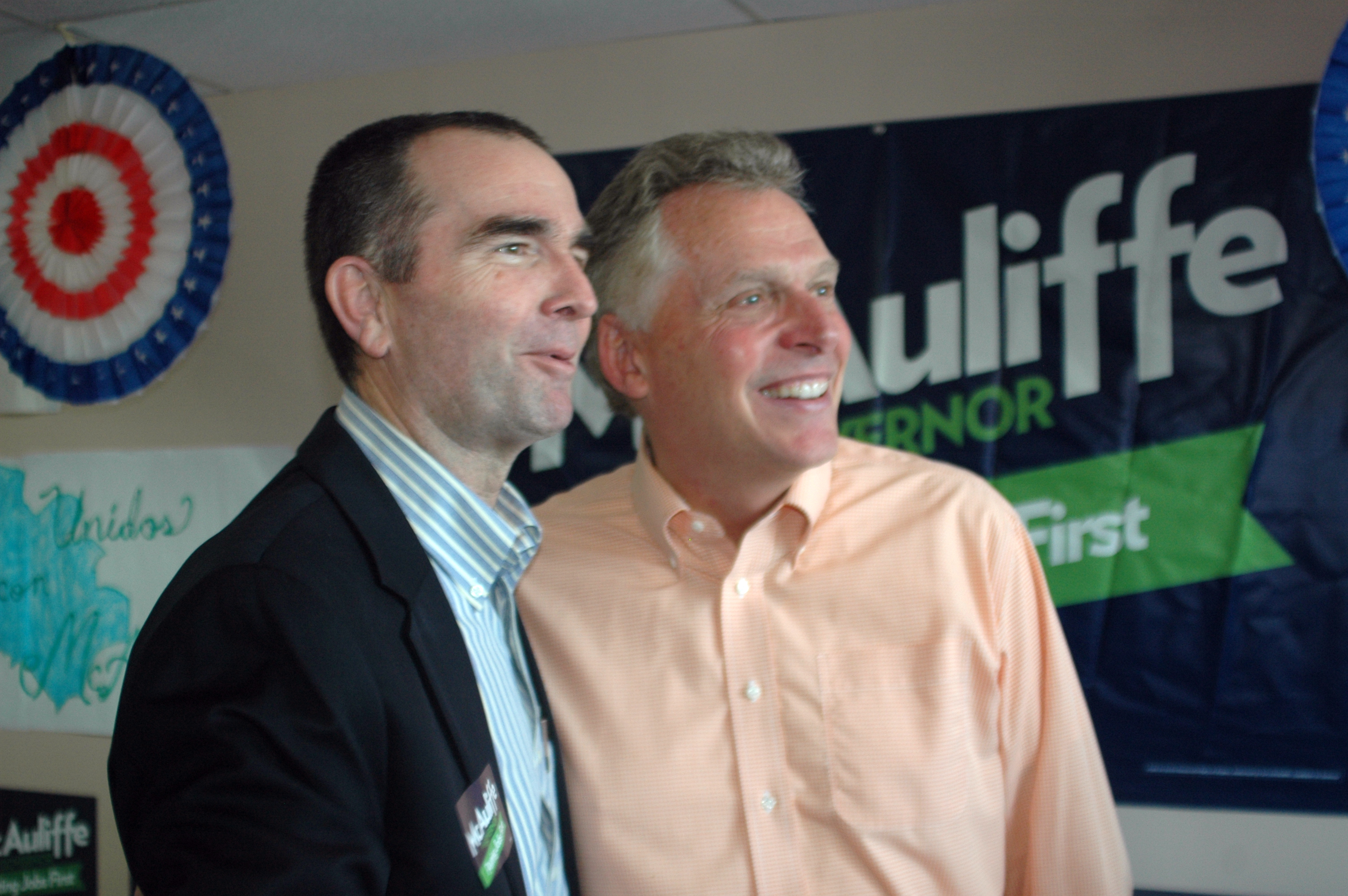
Northam ran for lieutenant governor as Terry McAuliffe's running mate.

Northam ran for Lieutenant Governor of Virginia in the 2013 election. Northam competed against U.S. Chief Technology Officer Aneesh Chopra for the Democratic nomination. On June 11, 2013, Northam won the Democratic primary over Chopra with 54% of the vote to Chopra's 46%.

On November 5, 2013, Northam was elected as Virginia's 40th Lieutenant Governor over Republican E. W. Jackson, receiving 55% of the vote to Jackson's 45%. Northam was the first Democrat since Tim Kaine in 2001 to be elected Lieutenant Governor of Virginia.

== Governor of Virginia (2018–2022) ==
=== Elections ===
==== 2017 ====
In February 2015, just over a year into his term as lieutenant governor, Northam confirmed his interest in running for Governor of Virginia in 2017. He made these intentions official on November 17, 2015, via an email to supporters.

In the Democratic primary, Northam faced Tom Perriello, who had previously served as a Congressman from Virginia and as a diplomat in the Obama administration. The primary campaign was often described as a proxy battle between the Bernie Sanders/Elizabeth Warren wing of the Democratic Party, represented by Perriello, and the Hillary Clinton wing, represented by Northam, although this take was dismissed as little more than a "talking point" by The Washington Post's editorial board, which praised both candidates and wrote, "the policy differences between the two, though real, are not enormous". The Washington Post endorsed Northam primarily on the basis of his "experience" and "temperament". In its endorsement, the publication explained that the next governor would likely have to work with a Republican-controlled legislature and wrote,

If any Democratic governor can nudge GOP majorities in his direction, it's Mr. Northam. That matters in a state where governors, barred from running for consecutive terms, have one brief shot at getting things done.

On June 13, 2017, Northam won the Democratic nomination with 56% of the vote to Perriello's 44%. In the general election, Northam faced Ed Gillespie, who had previously served as Counselor to the President under George W. Bush, chair of the Republican National Committee, and chair of the Republican Party of Virginia. Northam's campaign funds were heavily depleted by the end of the primary race. He was left with around $1.75 million, which amounted to roughly half of Gillespie's remaining funds. Northam quickly gained the advantage however – by the end of the summer, his available funds had grown twice as large as Gillespie's, with two months left in the campaign. Northam led Gillespie among small donors, as well: "5,900 donations under $100 to Gillespie's 2,100."

In October 2017, the Northam campaign released a small number of flyers omitting Northam's running-mate for lieutenant governor, Justin Fairfax. These were released at the request of Laborers' International Union of North America, which had endorsed only part of that year's Democratic ticket. Northam and that year's Democratic nominee for Attorney General, Mark Herring, were both endorsed by LIUNA and were both included on the flyer. LIUNA withheld its endorsement from Fairfax and explained that Fairfax opposes the construction of natural gas pipelines that are favored by the organization. As Fairfax is black, while Northam and Herring are both white, some activists criticized the decision to accommodate LIUNA's request. All houses that received the LIUNA flyers also received standard campaign flyers including Fairfax.

During the campaign, Gillespie and President Donald Trump accused Northam of being responsible for the increased activities of the MS-13 gangs and of being "in favor of sanctuary cities that let dangerous illegal immigrants back on the streets." Gillespie and Trump said that Northam had been the deciding vote to stop a Republican bill in the state Senate which would have banned sanctuary cities and that this contributed to the surge in MS-13 violence; a notion that FactCheck.org found to be "misleading". The Washington Post and CNN noted that there are no actual sanctuary cities in Virginia. Gillespie himself acknowledged that Virginia did not have sanctuary cities. The Washington Post furthermore noted that there is no evidence that sanctuary cities increase crime or gang activity, and that Virginia communities with higher immigrant populations have lower crime rates.

Later that month, the Latino Victory Fund, which was supporting Northam's campaign, released an ad in which a pickup truck, adorned with a Gillespie bumper sticker, a "Don't tread on me" license plate, and a Confederate flag, chases down minority children and corners them in an alley – one of the children in the ad then wakes up, revealing the scene to have been a nightmare. Although Northam and his campaign were not involved with the ad, Northam initially defended it, saying Gillespie's own ads "have promoted fearmongering, hatred, bigotry, racial divisiveness," and adding, "I mean, it's upset a lot of communities, and they have the right to express their views as well." The ad was pulled the following day in the hours after the terrorist attack in New York City, in which a man killed several people by running them over with a truck. Northam then distanced himself from the ad, re-emphasizing that it was not released by his campaign and saying that it is not one that he would have chosen to run. A spokesman for the campaign said that the Latino Victory Fund's decision to pull the ad was "appropriate and the right thing to do." FOX 5 DC reported that the Northam campaign had accepted $62,000 as an in-kind media contribution from the Latino Victory Fund.

During the final week of the campaign, Northam stated that he would continue opposing a preemptive ban on sanctuary cities in Virginia, as he had done while serving in the lieutenant governor position, although he also stated that if any sanctuary cities emerged in Virginia, he would support banning them. In response, the progressive group Democracy for America stated that it stopped direct aid of Northam's campaign. Howard Dean, who founded Democracy for America, but left the organization in 2016, wrote on Twitter that the organization had discredited itself and called its decision to stop aiding Northam's campaign "incredibly stupid". Democracy for America had already stopped collecting data for Northam and had ceased mentioning him in get-out-the-vote calls, due to the Northam campaign's decision to release LiUNA's flyers omitting Justin Fairfax.

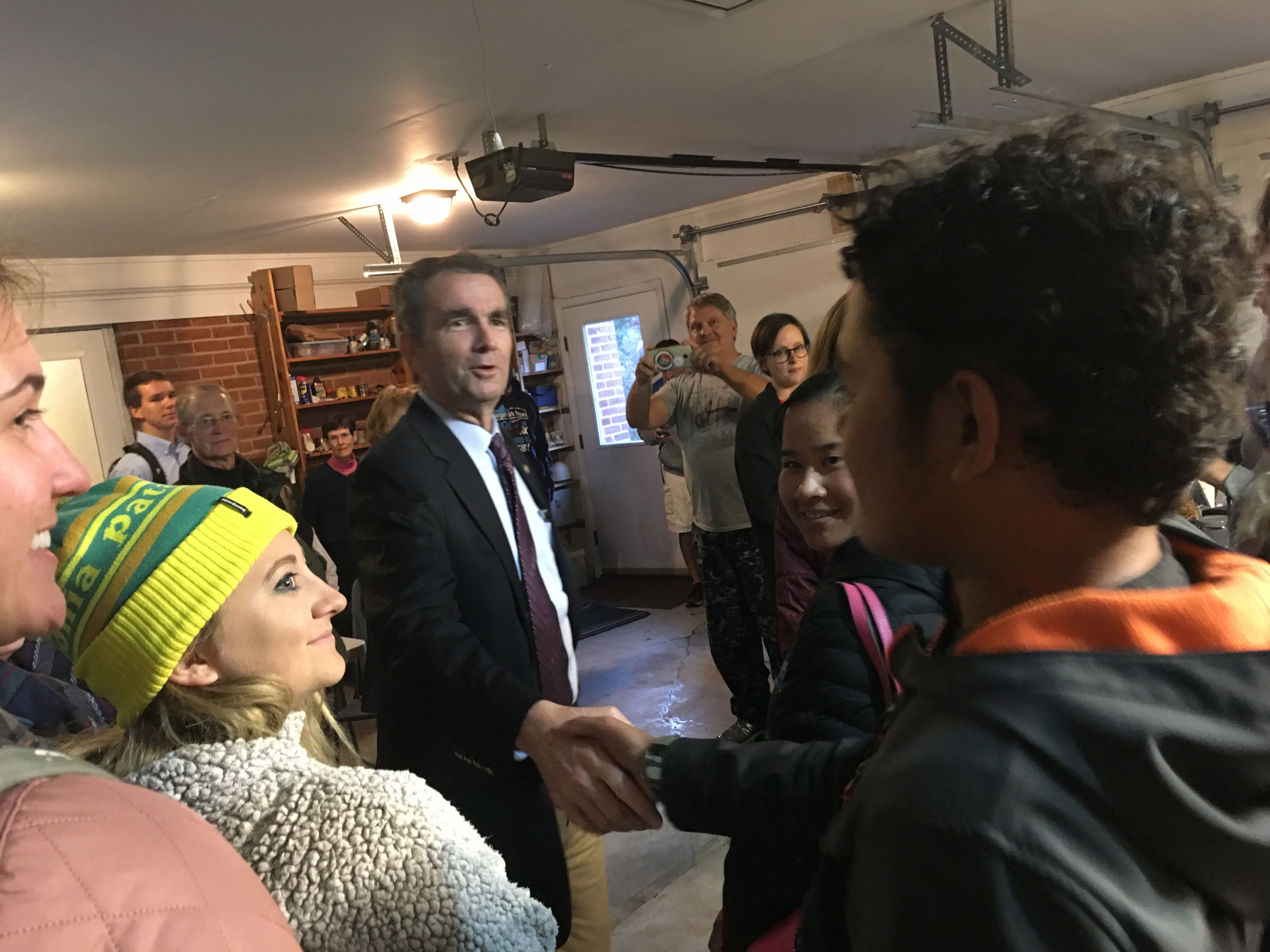
Northam meeting with volunteers in Blacksburg, Virginia, in 2017

Northam held campaign rallies with former President Barack Obama and former Vice President Joe Biden during the general election campaign.

According to The Washington Post, while campaigning for governor, Northam owned stock in several companies "doing extensive work in Virginia". Northam stated during the campaign that if elected governor, he would place his financial investments into a blind trust, so as to avoid any potential conflicts of interest.

According to a November 3, 2017, report by the Virginia Public Access Project, Northam raised $33.8 million to Gillespie's $24.5 million.

Northam was elected 73rd Governor of Virginia on November 7, 2017, defeating Ed Gillespie in the general election with a larger-than-expected nine-point margin of victory.

=== Tenure ===
==== Inauguration and cabinet appointees ====
Northam was sworn in as Governor of Virginia at noon on January 13, 2018, at the State Capitol. He became the second Eastern Shore native to serve as Governor of Virginia, after Henry A. Wise (who was elected in 1855), and the second alumnus of Virginia Military Institute to serve as governor, after Westmoreland Davis (who was elected in 1917). A majority of Northam's cabinet-level officials were female, a first in Virginia history. Residents from every county in Virginia attended Northam's inauguration (which reportedly marked another first for the state) and twenty-six groups participated in the inaugural parade, which was described as the largest and most diverse in state history.

Leading up to his inauguration, Northam announced that he would establish a new cabinet-level position, Chief Workforce Advisor, which would be responsible for coordinating the state's workforce development programs. To fill the position, Northam appointed Megan Healy, who had previously served as assistant vice chancellor for academic services and employer partnerships at the Virginia Community College System and as the director of STEM-H during the McAuliffe administration. Healy's husband served on Northam's transition team.

==== Response to Shenandoah Valley Juvenile Center lawsuit ====
In June 2018, six months into Northam's governorship, a class action lawsuit was publicly disclosed, which had been filed the previous October, claiming that Latino teenage detainees at the Shenandoah Valley Juvenile Center had been physically abused by staff members there. Most of the plaintiffs were being held at the facility on immigration charges. The abuse described in the lawsuit was alleged to have occurred from 2015 through 2018. The Shenandoah Valley Juvenile Center denied all claims in the lawsuit, while Northam called the allegations "disturbing" and directed state agencies to conduct an investigation.

Around two months later, the investigation concluded with no findings of ongoing abuse. Allegations of past abuse were not included within the scope of the investigation, and the lawsuit is still pending. The investigation resulted in the Virginia Department of Juvenile Justice presenting the Shenandoah Valley Juvenile Center with recommendations for new practices, such as improved training for facility staff members. Northam urged the juvenile center to adopt these recommendations, and the center responded with plans to do so. As youth held in Virginia facilities on immigration charges are there through outside contracts with the federal government, the Virginia Department of Juvenile Justice lacked oversight of these youth when the investigation began. In September of that year, the department expanded its authority to include oversight of youth held through any outside contract in Virginia facilities.

==== Yearbook discoveries and apology for blackface ====
Photograph from Northam's page in his medical school yearbook

On February 1, 2019, images from Northam's 1984 medical school yearbook were published on the far-right website Big League Politics. On Northam's page in the yearbook, among normal photos of Northam, there was also a photo of an unidentified person in blackface standing with another person in a Ku Klux Klan hood. A spokesman for Eastern Virginia Medical School confirmed that the image appeared in its 1984 yearbook. Shortly after the news broke, Northam apologized for appearing in the photo and issued a statement saying:

Earlier today, a website published a photograph of me from my 1984 medical school yearbook in a costume that is clearly racist and offensive. I am deeply sorry for the decision I made to appear as I did in this photo and for the hurt that decision caused then and now. This behavior is not in keeping with who I am today and the values I have fought for throughout my career in the military, in medicine, and in public service. But I want to be clear, I understand how this decision shakes Virginians' faith in that commitment. I recognize that it will take time and serious effort to heal the damage this conduct has caused. I am ready to do that important work. The first step is to offer my sincerest apology and to state my absolute commitment to living up to the expectations Virginians set for me when they elected me to be their Governor.

Prior to issuing his apology, Northam had privately reacted in confusion to the photo and told several people that he did not believe that he was either of the men depicted in the photo. Early that evening, he had also told Lieutenant Governor Justin Fairfax that although he had no recollection of the photo, he considered it a possibility that he was one of the two men depicted. According to The Washington Post, "two people familiar with the events of that evening" said that Northam "decided to take the blame" for the photo due to the pressure on him to issue a statement, even though at the time, Northam was still confused about the photo's origins.

Two days earlier on January 30, Northam had made controversial comments about abortion during a WTOP interview about the Repeal Act, where he stated that if a severely deformed or otherwise non-viable fetus was born after an unsuccessful abortion attempt, "the infant would be resuscitated if that's what the mother and the family desired, and then a discussion would ensue between the physicians and the mother." Conservative politicians and media figures characterized Northam's comments as promoting infanticide. After the yearbook photo was publicized, many conservative media outlets compared the two controversies and described them as a "bad week" for the governor. According to The Washington Post, the photo was sent as a tip to Big League Politics, the website that first published the photo on February 1, by one or more medical school classmates who were concerned about Northam's abortion comments.

The Virginia Senate's Democratic leader, Dick Saslaw, was among the few politicians who initially defended Northam, but later joined with the rest of his caucus in calling for Northam's resignation. Most other prominent Virginia politicians, including former governor Terry McAuliffe, under whom Northam served as lieutenant governor, the Speaker of the House of Delegates, Kirk Cox, the Virginia Legislative Black Caucus, senators Tim Kaine and Mark Warner in a joint statement with Rep. Bobby Scott, former Governor Douglas Wilder, and both the Republican Party of Virginia and Democratic Party of Virginia, called on him to resign. Derrick Johnson, the president and CEO of the NAACP; Planned Parenthood; and New Jersey Governor Phil Murphy similarly called for Northam's resignation. President Donald Trump decried the photo, as well as Northam's earlier comments on abortion, as "unforgivable". Several prominent national Republicans, such as House Minority Leader Kevin McCarthy and Republican National Committee chair Ronna Romney McDaniel joined in calling for Northam's resignation. Major national Democratic officials also called for Northam to step down, including 2020 presidential candidates Tulsi Gabbard, John Delaney, Pete Buttigieg, Julian Castro, Cory Booker, Kirsten Gillibrand, Elizabeth Warren and Kamala Harris, House Speaker Nancy Pelosi, the Democratic Governors Association, former Secretary of State Hillary Clinton, Senator Bernie Sanders, Representative Alexandria Ocasio-Cortez, and former Vice President of the United States Joe Biden. Faced with increasing calls for his resignation from fellow Democrats, Northam reportedly considered leaving the Democratic Party and trying to hold on to the governorship as an independent.

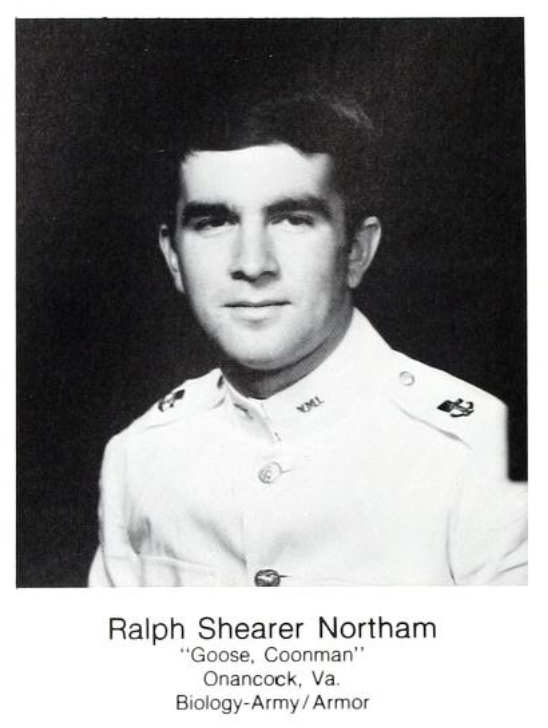
Northam's 1981 VMI yearbook photograph included the nicknames "Goose" and "Coonman"

After issuing his apology and as pressure mounted for his resignation, Northam called friends and former classmates to determine whether he was actually one of the men in the photo. The following morning, February 2, Northam told staffers that he was convinced he was not in the photo. Reportedly sleep-deprived and ignoring the protests of some staffers, Northam held a press conference that afternoon, in which he publicly denied that he was either of the men in the photo, but did admit to having "darkened [his] face" with shoe polish as part of a Michael Jackson costume around the same time. Reaction to the press conference was intensely negative and calls for Northam's resignation continued.

CBS News also unearthed Northam's Virginia Military Institute yearbook, which listed "Coonman", a racial slur, as one of Northam's nicknames; Northam told reporters that two people referred to him by that name, and said that he regretted the presence of the nickname in his yearbook, and that he did not understand why that nickname was bestowed on him.

A months-long investigation into the photo that appeared in the 1984 Eastern Virginia Medical School yearbook could not "conclusively" determine who is in the photo or even how the image came to be there. A team hired by EVMS released a 55-page report on May 22, 2019, saying: "We could not conclusively determine the identity of either individual depicted in the photograph." McGuireWoods contacted over 80 people connected to the school, including five members of their yearbook staff at the time.

Despite the yearbook scandal, as well as those surrounding Virginia's other two elected statewide officials: Lieutenant Governor Justin Fairfax and state Attorney General Mark Herring, the Democratic Party of Virginia won control of both the Virginia Senate and the Virginia House of Delegates in the statewide elections that November, amid some predictions that the scandals could negatively impact Democratic success in the coming elections. Northam's approval rating fell to 40% in the immediate aftermath of the scandal but recovered significantly by the end of his term. Northam's political "rebirth" was celebrated in the mainstream media.

==== Pledge to address Virginia's racial inequities ====
Facing widespread calls for his resignation, Northam chose to remain in office but made a public commitment to focus the remainder of his gubernatorial term on addressing Virginia's racial inequities. He and his cabinet then joined with the Virginia Legislative Black Caucus to develop strategies for closing the racial disparity in Virginia's maternal mortality rate, increasing affordable housing and funding for public transportation, supporting minority-owned businesses, removing Confederate monuments from public spaces, removing racist remnants of the Jim Crow era from state lawbooks, rethinking the state's approach to how African American history is taught in public schools, and establishing sensitivity training for state agencies.

On March 22, 2019, Northam signed a bill, introduced by the chairman of Virginia's Legislative Black Caucus, Lamont Bagby, establishing the Virginia African American Advisory Board; this board is designed to consist of twenty-one non-legislative citizens appointed by the governor, at least fifteen of whom must be black; additionally, the board includes five members of the governor's cabinet. (Note: The board's five seats reserved for state cabinet members are to be filled by the Secretaries of the Commonwealth, Commerce and Trade, Education, Health and Human Resources, and Public Safety and Homeland Security; alternatively, the seats can be filled by designees of those secretaries.) The board's purpose is to advise the governor on how to best serve African Americans living in the state. Comparable boards for the state's Latino and Asian communities had already existed, and Bagby called the African American Advisory Board "far overdue". Upon establishing the board, Northam said that it would "ensure the voices of all Virginians are heard, particularly those from underrepresented and historically disenfranchised communities."

In May of that year, Northam announced his intent to establish a new cabinet-level position, Chief Diversity Officer. This position would be responsible for advancing equity and inclusion throughout the state government's operations. Virginia is considered to be the first state in the country to establish such a position at the cabinet-level. On September 9, Northam named Janice Underwood as the inaugural Chief Diversity Officer. Underwood had previously led diversity initiatives at Old Dominion University. Among the issues that Underwood has focused on as Chief Diversity Officer are supporting small businesses owned by women, minorities, and disabled veterans, reducing inequities in health care, and diversifying employment in the state's public and private sectors.

==== COVID-19 pandemic response ====
On March 12, 2020, Northam declared a state of emergency in response to the COVID-19 pandemic. At the time, there were seventeen known cases of the virus in Virginia. On March 13, Northam closed all Virginia schools, and on March 15, he imposed statewide restrictions to allow no more than 100 people at public gatherings. On the seventeenth, he set even stricter limits on public gatherings, allowing no more than ten people together in most areas; grocery and retail stores, pharmacies, medical facilities, manufacturing plants and distribution centers, and transportation hubs were all exempted from the gathering limit.

Although schools were originally scheduled to reopen in Virginia after two weeks, on March 23, Northam extended their closure for the remainder of the school year. At this time, there were over 250 known cases of COVID-19 in the state. On April 6, Northam began encouraging the use of face masks by those occupying public spaces. On May 26, he announced a statewide policy requiring the use of facemasks in public indoor spaces. On September 25, Northam and his wife Pamela both tested positive for COVID-19 after one of their staff members became infected. The governor was asymptomatic while his wife suffered mild symptoms. By the end of 2020, over 4,800 Virginians were confirmed dead due to the virus.

==== Tenant protections ====
The pandemic prompted Northam in March 2020 to request that the Supreme Court of Virginia issue a moratorium against evictions. One was subsequently issued but expired in June. Northam then requested that the moratorium be extended and the court agreed to do so in August. In July, after the initial moratorium had lapsed, eviction cases were opened throughout the state, and those cases continued to proceed even after the moratorium was extended in August.

The extended moratorium expired September 7. The Supreme Court of Virginia denied Northam's request for a second extension of the moratorium but declared that a federal moratorium against evictions had to be recognized in Virginia. The federal moratorium – which was set to expire at the end of the year, but was later extended into 2021 – only applied to tenants earning less than a certain amount, who were struggling financially and at risk of exposure to COVID-19 if evicted.

According to The Washington Post, thousands of evictions continued to be filed in Virginia under the federal moratorium "because of the state's loose interpretation of the order." Its limitations led Northam to consider the federal moratorium to be insufficient protection for those facing the possibility of eviction.

Housing advocates pressed Northam throughout 2020 to issue an executive order banning evictions in Virginia for the duration of the pandemic. Northam demurred, suggesting that such an order would have been susceptible to legal challenges. On November 18, he instead amended the state budget to implement a temporary statewide ban on evictions in most circumstances; under the ban, which lasted through the end of 2020, tenants could only be evicted for failure to pay rent if they refused to pursue rent relief programs; the ban also required that landlords provide written notice of state and local rent relief programs to any tenants who failed to pay rent. Once the ban expired at the end of 2020, Northam's amended state budget provided for several new tenant protections to take its place at the start of 2021; these protections allow landlords to evict tenants for failure to pay rent only after the landlords have applied for rental assistance on behalf of the tenants, require landlords who own more than four rental units to offer payment plans to tenants who have been impacted by COVID-19, and extend the amount of notice tenants must be given before eviction from five days to fourteen.

The tenant protections enacted through the state budget did not prevent evictions from continuing in Virginia for reasons other than failure to pay rent, nor did they prevent landlords in the state from denying lease renewals to tenants eligible for rental assistance. Although many of the protections from the state budget expired at the end of June 2021, they were renewed in August through June 2022.

About one-fifth as many evictions were filed in Virginia throughout the first half of 2021 as had been normal for the state before the pandemic. At the start of Northam's term, Virginia had one of the nation's highest eviction rates, and efforts to reduce that rate had already begun under Northam prior to the pandemic.

The rent relief program that Virginia established in response to the pandemic was among the first in the nation. Initially funded by the state alone, the program received additional funding from the federal government in January 2021. Since then, Virginia's rent relief program has distributed a higher percentage of its federal funding than has been distributed by any other state for this purpose and is second only to Texas in the total amount of federal funding that it has distributed. The policy that Northam enacted through the state budget requiring that landlords apply for rent relief on behalf of their tenants before they can file evictions for nonpayment was credited by The Virginian-Pilot as a primary reason for Virginia's effective distribution of rent relief and was credited by The Washington Post as a primary reason for the state's achievement of a low eviction rate in 2021. The Christian Science Monitor wrote that during Northam's tenure in office, Virginia became a "national model" for tenant protections.

==== Utility assistance ====
In September 2020, Northam asked the State Corporation Commission to extend its moratorium on utility cutoffs, which had first been implemented in March. The commission agreed to extend the moratorium until October 5. Northam then asked for a further extension in October, which the commission denied. On November 18, Northam reimplemented the moratorium through an amendment to the state budget. Although when implemented by the commission, the moratorium had applied only to private utility companies, the version implemented through the state budget applied to all utilities, including those operated by local and regional governments. The state government was able to grant exemptions from this moratorium to utilities that were at risk of insolvency. Under reforms introduced through the state budget, customers who are unable to pay their utility bills for more thirty days during the pandemic are ensured access to payment plans.

The moratorium expired in August 2021. That same month, Northam and the Virginia legislature implemented a new moratorium protecting financially vulnerable residential customers of the state's largest utility provider, Dominion Energy. This moratorium continued until March 2022. For residential customers of the state's other utility providers, funds from the American Rescue Plan Act were made available to assist those who were unable to pay their bills for over sixty days. The requirement that utility customers be offered payment plans also remained in effect.

==== Workplace safety standards ====
In May 2020, Northam instructed the Virginia Department of Labor and Industry to develop new workforce safety standards in response to the pandemic. The department's Board of Safety and Health Codes voted on June 24 and July 15 to make those standards mandatory statewide. The federal government under President Trump had previously issued safety standards to guide employers during the pandemic but had not made those guidelines mandatory. Virginia was the first state in the nation to adopt mandatory workforce safety standards in response to the pandemic. These standards were set to expire at the end of January 2021, but were extended indefinitely that same month.

==== Protections for inmates ====
In March 2020, Northam urged localities to reduce their jail populations, so as to lessen the spread of COVID-19 among inmates, and in April, he proposed an amendment to the state budget that would allow the Virginia Department of Corrections to release non-dangerous inmates with remaining sentences of one year or less. This amendment was passed by the Virginia legislature on April 22. It marks the first time that the Virginia Department of Corrections has ever held authority to release inmates early. The policy remained in effect until July 2021. To qualify for the policy, inmates were required to have a place to stay upon release. An algorithm-calculated recidivism rate is also used to determine whether an inmate qualifies for release under the policy.

Some political activists have called the policy overly narrow and have suggested that Northam should further reduce Virginia's prison population through issuing clemency to certain inmates. Northam and the Department of Corrections faced multiple lawsuits from inmates who claimed to be at risk of contracting COVID-19. In May, a settlement was reached in one of those lawsuits. Subsequently, the ACLU argued that the Virginia Department of Corrections had proceeded to violate the terms of that settlement multiple times. In July, the Marshall Project reported that Virginia's prison population had decreased by the smallest amount of any state in the nation during the pandemic.

==== Outbreak at the Farmville Detention Center ====
In July 2020, when an outbreak of COVID-19 occurred at the for-profit Immigration Corporation of America-operated Farmville Detention Center, Northam's administration responded by twice offering to have the Virginia Department of Health help conduct testing at the facility. Those offers were then declined for undisclosed reasons. Because ICE facilities are not operated by the Virginia government, Northam reasoned that he was unable to unilaterally intervene in the situation – a conclusion that some immigration advocates have disputed. Before the outbreak, Northam had unsuccessfully urged the Trump administration to conduct point prevalence testing at ICE facilities, and soon after the outbreak, Northam joined with Virginia senators Mark Warner and Tim Kaine in calling on the Trump administration to intervene at the Farmville facility. In a letter to President Trump, Northam requested that the Centers for Disease Control and Prevention (CDC) dispatch a team to address the situation.

That summer, it was reported that over 260 of the Farmville Detention Center's estimated 400 detainees had contracted COVID-19. According to ICE, most of those infected at the facility were asymptomatic, although the detainees themselves and their lawyers claimed that many detainees at the facility developed symptoms. In August, The Washington Post wrote that the Farmville facility had what was at the time "the nation's largest coronavirus outbreak inside a detention center." In September, the same publication reported that over 330 detainees at the facility had been infected during the outbreak.

Shortly before the start of the outbreak, seventy-four undocumented immigrants had been transferred to the Farmville Detention Center from facilities in Arizona and Florida. These detainees were neither tested nor quarantined prior to arriving at the Farmville facility, even though they were transferred from facilities where COVID-19 had already occurred. A lawsuit filed in July on behalf of detainees at the Farmville facility argued that the Farmville Detention Center had violated its own policy when the transferred detainees were not quarantined. (Note: Although the transferred detainees were isolated from the rest of the population at the Farmville Detention Center for fourteen days, they were isolated within the Farmville facility itself, rather than at a separate location. The Farmville facility's official policy during the pandemic requires that isolation occur at a separate location before detainees can be transferred into the facility.) The lawsuit further argued that crowded conditions, poor ventilation, infrequent testing, and insufficient medical treatment had contributed to the outbreak, while detailing the use of pepper spray and solitary confinement on detainees who protested these conditions.

Per Northam's request, a CDC team conducted a week-long evaluation of the Farmville Detention Center in August. Although the team described failures to observe CDC guidelines at the facility as minimal, it faulted staff members for wearing masks inconsistently and for not always isolating after developing symptoms associated with COVID-19. It also expressed concern that the layout of the facility made physical distancing impractical in certain areas. Citing these findings, a federal judge ordered a new inspection of the facility later that same month. This new inspection found that the facility had managed to adopt physical distancing procedures but faulted the facility for not always isolating symptomatic detainees. It also faulted some detainees for not wearing masks. The Washington Post later reported on the conditions at the facility in greater detail, explaining that most infected detainees remained in their regular dorm rooms during the outbreak because there were only nine medical isolation rooms in the facility. The publication further reported that staffers at the facility continued to work during the outbreak "through nausea, diarrhea and breathlessness" and were allegedly asked to work even after testing positive for COVID-19. Several detainees at the facility abandoned their asylum cases and asked to be deported so as to escape the outbreak. At least one of them was killed soon after returning to his home country.

In early August, a Canadian national detained at the Farmville Detention Center died of COVID-19 shortly before he was to be deported. A few days later, a federal judge ordered the Farmville facility to stop admitting new detainees. Later that month, the outbreak ended.

In September, an official from the Department of Homeland Security stated that the detainees from Arizona and Florida had been transferred to the Farmville Detention Center as an excuse to transport Special Response Teams on charter flights to Washington D.C., where the teams were then used over the summer to suppress that city's George Floyd protests. A former ICE official has corroborated this claim. Although moving weapons and equipment is easier for ICE employees on charter flights than it is on commercial flights, ICE employees are only allowed to travel on charter flights when accompanied by detainees. The decision to transfer detainees to the Farmville Detention Center so that Special Response Teams could travel on charter flights has been described by multiple officials from the Department of Homeland Security as an abuse of the ICE charter flight policy. Although ICE claimed that the detainees had been transferred from facilities that were near capacity, official records reviewed by The Washington Post show that the Arizona and Florida facilities were not actually near capacity when the transfers occurred. The Farmville facility's own capacity before accepting the transferred detainees was already much higher than the capacities of many other detention centers around the country.

From September through December 2020, the only other immigration detention center in Virginia, the Caroline Detention Facility, experienced smaller outbreaks of COVID-19. On October 21, in response to the outbreaks at both the Farmville and Caroline facilities, Northam signed a bill granting the Virginia state government permanent authority to conduct both health inspections and wrongful death investigations at detention facilities in the state.

==== Alleged kidnapping plot ====
On October 8, 2020, a federal indictment against six men associated with the Wolverine Watchmen, a Michigan-based militia group, was unsealed. The indictment charges the men with plotting to kidnap Michigan Governor Gretchen Whitmer and violently overthrow Michigan's government. During a court hearing on October 13, an FBI agent testified that the suspects had also discussed kidnapping Northam in response to his mitigation measures against COVID-19.

==== School masking ====
In March 2020, as part of the statewide response, Governor Northam shut down schools across the commonwealth for the remainder of the 2019–20 school year. For the 2020–21 school year, local Virginia districts determined whether schools were shut down for the year. Schools that remained open to in-person attendance were required to have mitigation measures in place that aligned with CDC guidelines. Mitigation measures included face masks for children ages 10 and up.

In July 2021, after the COVID-19 vaccine had achieved widespread distribution, Northam announced that he would urge but not require continued masking in schools. However, in August 2021, Northam and State Health Commissioner Norm Oliver issued a new public health order mandating universal masking in all K–12 schools, which included both public and private schools, for children ages 4 and up.

During the fall 2021 gubernatorial race, Republican Glenn Youngkin made school mask mandates the center of his "Parents Matter" campaign, and he defeated Democrat Terry McAuliffe. Northam's mask mandates was widely cited as one reason for Youngkin's successful race.

== Political positions ==
The Washington Post described Northam as a moderate state senator who moved to the left on some issues during the 2017 gubernatorial Democratic primary, such as support for a $15 minimum wage and opposition to a state constitutional amendment enshrining right-to-work legislation.

=== Abortion ===
Northam supports abortion rights. As a Virginia state senator, he opposed a bill to mandate vaginal ultrasounds for women seeking abortions, and voted against the bill when it was revised to mandate only abdominal ultrasounds. He was endorsed in the 2017 Democratic gubernatorial primary by the abortion rights group NARAL and its Virginia affiliate. Northam argued for reducing abortion rates through education and expanding access to contraceptives. Planned Parenthood pledged to spend $3 million supporting Northam in his 2017 general election campaign for governor. Northam opposes banning abortions after 20 weeks through a state version of the Pain-Capable Unborn Child Protection Act.

For third-trimester abortions, Northam supported Virginia's law requiring certification by multiple physicians. (Note: This law allows third-trimester abortions to be certified by a single physician if continued pregnancy is found to pose an imminent danger to a woman's life.) During a January 2019 radio interview, Northam said that third-trimester abortions may be done in cases of a non-viable fetus or severe deformity. If a delivery occurred in such cases, Northam further stated that, "The infant would be resuscitated if that's what the mother and the family desired, and then a discussion would ensue between the physicians and the mother." This statement drew intense criticism from Republican politicians nationwide, many of whom accused Northam of supporting infanticide. (Note: Northam's full answer to the abortion question during the interview with NBC4 reporter Julie Carey, WTOP-FM, on January 30, 2019.) Northam's office refuted such criticism as a mischaracterization of his comments.

=== Animal welfare ===
As a state senator, Northam introduced a bill to ban the use of gas chambers on companion animals in Virginia, addressing a means of euthanasia that has been described by medical experts as less humane than lethal injection. The ban was signed into law by Tim Kaine in 2008. During Virginia's 2017 gubernatorial election, Northam was endorsed by both the Humane Society Legislative Fund and Humane Dominion. In its endorsement, the former organization stated, "In addition to advancing statewide animal protection policy, Northam has demonstrated concern for animals in his personal life, growing up on a farm and understanding the importance of proper animal care."

In 2018, Northam signed a law requiring that products developed in Virginia use non-animal based testing methods whenever possible; when such methods are not possible, the law requires that the number of animals used in testing be minimized and that the most humane testing method be used. The law exempts testing done for medical research. It also allows animal testing to be conducted whenever required by federal or state agencies. This law made Virginia the fourth state to restrict animal based product testing.

That same year, Northam signed a law banning state-funded, medically unnecessary experiments in Virginia that induce unalleviated pain in cats or dogs; this law, which defines "medically unnecessary" experiments as those not done for the benefit of the animal test subjects, is the first of its kind in the United States and passed with unanimous support in the Virginia state legislature.

In 2019, Northam signed a law classifying the physical abuse of cats and dogs as a felony in Virginia; previously, such abuse had been classified as a misdemeanor in Virginia, unless it resulted in an animal's death; it was not until later that year that federal law made abuse against all kinds of mammals, birds, amphibians, and reptiles a federal felony. That same year, Northam vetoed a bill that would have established a mandatory minimum sentence of six months for the killing or injuring of a police animal. Noting that Virginia law already classified violence against police animals as a felony, Northam explained his veto by arguing against the value of mandatory minimum sentences and stating, "While violence is unacceptable, these are crimes that can be addressed by a judge with full knowledge of the facts and circumstances of each particular case."

Additional animal welfare bills signed by Northam in 2019 add requirements for the proper sheltering and tethering of animals and provide animal control officers the authority to confiscate tethered roosters that have been involved in cockfighting. Prior to 2019, tethers used on pets (Note: Virginia law does not classify walking an animal on a leash as tethering.) were required by Virginia law to be at least three times the animal's length; the law signed by Northam in 2019 changes this to at least ten feet or three times the animal's length, whichever is greater. In 2020, Northam signed a law revising this to fifteen feet or four times the animal's length, whichever is greater. The 2020 law allows the 2019 standard to be enforced when an animal control officer determines that a shorter tether would be preferable. The 2019 law also established that tethers must weigh no more than one-tenth the animal's body weight, cannot be weighed down, and cannot be painful. The 2019 law regarding the proper sheltering of animals requires protection from hot and cold weather. In 2020, Northam signed a law banning the tethering of animals in extreme weather or temperatures (except for when an animal control officer determines that a tethered animal can safely tolerate such conditions); this law also requires that tethered animals be safe from predators.

A bill signed by Northam in 2020 tasked the Virginia Board of Agriculture and Consumer Services with establishing new state regulations for pet stores. To enforce those regulations, the bill created the position of State Animal Welfare Inspector. Northam proposed an unsuccessful amendment to this bill; his amendment would have expanded the state government's definition of a commercial dog breeder to include any person who breeds dogs for research purposes. This amendment was proposed following revelations of poor conditions at a breeding facility in Cumberland, Virginia. Housing thousands of beagles bred for research purposes, the Cumberland facility is the largest of its kind in the state and would have faced increased regulation had Northam's amendment been enacted. Although widely supported among animal rights organizations, such as PETA and the Humane Society of the United States, Northam's amendment was opposed by the bill's sponsor, David W. Marsden, who claimed that the amendment could potentially cause the Cumberland facility to close. Northam agreed to rescind his support for the amendment, while Marsden expressed a desire to implement a revised approach to the amendment's goals in 2021.

Additional animal welfare bills signed by Northam in 2020 ban dealers and commercial breeders in Virginia from selling or importing any dog bred by any person who has committed certain violations of the Animal Welfare Act; ban any sale or loan in which a default could result in the repossession of any cat or dog; ban any hunt that guarantees the killing of a deer, bear, or wild turkey; ban any contact between the public and certain types of dangerous animals in captivity; limit the circumstances in which any cat or dog is allowed to be leased or rented; and establish more detailed standards for animal shelters. The law banning public contact with dangerous animals applies to any bear, cougar, jaguar, leopard, (Note: Except for Clouded leopards, which are unregulated by the bill.) lion, nonhuman primate, tiger, or hybrid of such animals; as first written, the bill would have applied to elephants as well, but before the bill passed, it was revised to exclude elephants.

=== Civil rights ===
On March 8, 2019, Northam signed a bill repealing a minimum wage exemption that had applied to several jobs historically associated with black workers; a remnant of the Jim Crow era, the exemption had applied to shoe-shiners, ushers, doormen, concession attendants, and theater cashiers. A month before signing this bill, Northam had faced scandals over racist content found in his college and medical school yearbooks and responded to calls for his resignation by pledging to prioritize racial justice issues throughout the remainder of his term in office. On June 4 of that year, he announced plans to continue repealing all discriminatory state laws that had been passed during the Jim Crow era. To identify those laws, he established the Commission to Examine Racial Inequity in Virginia Law, which formed with nine members on September 3. The commission was assisted by students from Virginia Commonwealth University, the University of Richmond School of Law, and the University of Virginia School of Law. On December 5, the commission issued a report recommending the repeal of 98 laws, most of which had already become legally unenforceable. The commission stated, "Though most of these pieces of legislation are outdated and have no legal effect, they remain enshrined in law. The Commission believes that such vestiges of Virginia's segregationist past should no longer have official status."

Among the laws identified in the 2019 report were a ban on interracial marriage, a requirement that spouses be identified by race on marriage licenses, (Note: This identification requirement used racially offensive terms and had remained in effect until October 2019, when it was ruled unconstitutional by a federal judge.: One month before that court ruling, Virginia Attorney General Mark Herring had issued a policy allowing couples to opt-out of the racial identification requirement.) policies that had been enacted to prevent school integration, requirements that neighborhoods, trains, playgrounds, and steamboats be racially segregated, and a poll tax. These laws were repealed in a bipartisan package of bills signed by Northam on April 11, 2020.

On June 11 of that year, Northam authorized the commission to enter a new phase of research; this phase is focused on identifying modern laws and regulations that have contributed to social inequities in Virginia. The commission will also devise policies to remedy those inequities. Chief Deputy Attorney General of Virginia Cynthia Hudson, who chairs the commission, said about this second phase of work, "it's certainly not my expectation to find the expressly racist language and intent that we found in the Acts of Assembly from generations ago. So, the nature of the work will turn to trying to discern what the impact is from an equity perspective of current law that might not on its face appear discriminatory, but in its effect, disproportionately impacts people of color and other under-represented communities." Northam also signed legislation in 2020 establishing a separate commission tasked with studying the impacts of slavery and discrimination in Virginia.

On March 4, 2020, Northam signed a bill making Virginia the fourth US state and first southern state to ban racial hair discrimination. The bill passed with unanimous support in the state senate. Upon signing the bill, Northam remarked, "It's pretty simple - if we send children home from school because their hair looks a certain way, or otherwise ban certain hairstyles associated with a particular race - that is discrimination. This is not only unacceptable and wrong, it is not what we stand for in Virginia."

On April 11 of the same year, Northam signed the bipartisan Virginia Values Act, which applies anti-discrimination protections to public accommodations. Prior to the bill, Virginia had been one of five US states that did not have any such protections. The Virginia Values Act also updated Virginia's existing anti-discrimination laws to add protections on the bases of gender identity, sexual orientation, and veteran's status.

An additional civil rights bill signed by Northam in 2020 established a process for the removal of racially exclusionary housing covenants from property deeds in Virginia; these covenants had been widely adopted throughout the United States in the early-twentieth century for the purpose of banning racial minorities from living in certain areas. Although all such covenants had become legally unenforceable in the 1960s, little had been done by 2020 to purge the covenants from official legal records. The bill signed by Northam in 2020 allows property owners to have the covenants removed without the need of an attorney.

Later in the year, during a special legislative session largely devoted to racial justice issues, Northam signed a bill making it a hate crime in Virginia for someone motivated by bias against any protected group to make a false report to law enforcement.

=== Confederate monuments ===
On the controversies over public monuments to the Confederacy, in June 2017 Northam stated that the statues in the state Capitol that the General Assembly has jurisdiction over "should be taken down and moved into museums", and that the decision on other statues "belongs to local communities." He has said that there should be more public memorials to historical Virginia civil rights leaders such as Barbara Rose Johns, Oliver Hill, and Samuel Wilbert Tucker. In August 2017, Northam took a firmer stance, saying, "I believe these statues should be taken down and moved into museums. As governor, I am going to be a vocal advocate for that approach and work with localities on this issue." Northam later reverted to his original stance that decisions on the monuments should be made locally.

In early June 2020, Northam announced the removal of Robert E. Lee Monument on Richmond's Monument Avenue in response to Black Lives Matter protests after the murder of George Floyd.

=== Criminal justice ===
==== Felony larceny threshold ====
After Northam was elected governor, The Washington Post identified an opportunity for bipartisan legislation in raising Virginia's felony larceny threshold. Set at $200, the threshold was then tied with New Jersey for lowest in the nation. The threshold's value had not been raised since 1980, and had it kept pace with inflation, would have been equal to around $600 in 2017. Outgoing governor Terry McAuliffe attempted during his final year in office to raise the threshold's value to $500 but was unable to advance such a proposal through the legislature. During Virginia's 2017 gubernatorial campaign, Northam's opponent, Ed Gillespie, voiced support for the $500 threshold, while both Northam and McAuliffe called for the threshold to be raised even further to $1,000, a value more closely aligned with the thresholds used in a majority of other states.

In February 2018, about a month after his inauguration as governor, Northam struck a deal with the Republican-controlled legislature to raise the felony threshold to $500; in exchange, Northam gave support to Republican-sponsored legislation that would require criminal defendants seeking parole to first pay full restitution to victims. McAuliffe had vetoed a comparable restitution bill the previous year. The Washington Post's editorial board called Northam's compromise "a small step toward fairer justice in Virginia", but voiced concern that the restitution bill would place an onerous burden on poor defendants; the editorial board also noted that the $500 threshold would still be one of the country's lowest and, when adjusted for inflation, under the level that had been set in 1980.

On March 4, 2020, after Democrats won control of the Virginia state legislature, Northam signed a bill raising the felony larceny threshold to $1000. The Roanoke Times described this action as fulfilling one of Northam's "criminal justice reform priorities". Upon signing the bill, Northam said, "While we will continue to hold people accountable for their actions, it's important that the punishment fit the crime. This bill will bring Virginia in line with the majority of states in our country, modernizing our law to ensure that one mistake does not define a person's entire life."

==== Virginia's policy of suspending driver's licenses ====
During their respective gubernatorial campaigns, Northam and his opponent, Ed Gillespie, both criticized Virginia's practice of suspending driver's licenses for unpaid court-ordered fines and fees. Northam campaigned on an official end to this practice, while Gillespie wanted to "functionally end" the practice through the use of payment plans. (Note: Although Northam's gubernatorial predecessor, Terry McAuliffe, shared Northam's stance on ending this practice, the Republican-controlled legislature under McAuliffe was unreceptive to the idea. McAuliffe signed a bill in May 2017 that made payment plans more accessible for people who owed these costs.) In the year Northam was elected governor, the Legal Aid Justice Center estimated that Virginia's policy of suspending driver's licenses for unmade payments had impacted around one million people. At that time, Virginia was facing a class action lawsuit over this issue.

While advocating for a repeal of the practice, Northam remarked, "Often, people don't pay court costs because they can't afford it. Suspending their license for these unpaid fees makes it that much harder on them." He argued that a repeal would make it easier for people to pay their debt, noting that people who are prevented from legally driving struggle to earn an income. Although The Washington Post noted that similar policies were facing scrutiny at that time throughout much of the United States, the publication also wrote that Virginia's policy was among the strictest in the nation, as Virginia was one of the few states where the debt-based suspension of driver's licenses was not limited to cases in which money was owed due to traffic violations.

In January 2019, the Virginia state Senate passed a bill that would have repealed the penalty of suspending driver's licenses for unpaid debt, but that February, a Republican-controlled subcommittee in the House of Delegates defeated the bill. In March of that year, a repeal of this penalty was included by Northam as an amendment to the state budget. The penalty could not be fully repealed by the budget. Instead, the budget was able to pause the penalty for one year. Virginia's legislature adopted Northam's proposed budget amendment, which also reinstated driver's licenses that had been suspended solely for unpaid debt.

This occurred in the wake of a commitment from Northam to focus the remainder of his tenure on combating racial inequities in Virginia. The Washington Post's editorial board found that Virginia's debt-based suspension of driver's licenses disproportionately impacted minorities and described the repeal of this policy as a priority for the state's Legislative Black Caucus. While developing that year's state budget, Northam was embroiled in scandals concerning racist content found in his college and medical school yearbooks. Explaining how the criticism he had faced over these scandals was informing his approach to the state budget, Northam said, "There's a level of awareness regarding race inequities in Virginia that we have never seen - that I have never seen in my lifetime. I am going to do everything...to really bring some good from the events that happened six weeks ago...Actions speak louder than words, and now is our opportunity over the next three years to really take action."

In April 2020, after Virginia's General Assembly came under Democratic control and before the above-mentioned budget amendment was set to expire, Northam signed a bipartisan bill making the effects of the amendment permanent. That same month, Northam signed separate legislation ending the suspension of driver's licenses in Virginia both for non-driving related drug offenses and for theft of motor fuel. He also repealed a mandatory minimum sentence of ten days that Virginia had been imposing on third or subsequent convictions of driving with a suspended license. Virginia was among the first US states to end the practice of suspending driver's licenses for outstanding debt but was the 45th state to end the practice of suspending driver's licenses for non-driving related drug offenses.

==== Limited reinstatement of parole ====
During Virginia's 2020 legislative session, there was discussion among the General Assembly's newly Democratic majority about the possibility of fully reinstating parole, which had been abolished by the state in 1995 under then-governor George Allen. Only prisoners sentenced before 1995 or under a youthful offender statute (Note: This applies to some first-time offenders who are sentenced while under the age of twenty-one and who are not convicted of Class 1 felonies.) remained eligible for parole after the enactment of the 1995 ban, unless they qualified for geriatric parole, which was not abolished.

Northam's administration argued that Virginia's parole ban had exacerbated the state's racial inequities, led to an increase in elderly inmates receiving costly medical care at the state's expense, and strained the state's prison capacities. A full repeal of the ban was not approved in 2020, although legislation signed by Northam that year reinstated parole in limited circumstances.

One of these circumstances addressed certain prisoners sentenced during the first five years of the parole ban. Before the 2000 state Supreme Court case Fishback v. Commonwealth ruled that juries in Virginia must be informed of the state's parole ban, many juries in Virginia had been unaware of the ban. (Note: Due to legal ambiguity predating Fishback v. Commonwealth, between 1995 and 2000, some juries in Virginia were told about the state's parole ban while others were not.) Prisoners sentenced by these uninformed juries came to be known as the "Fishback inmates". Virginia remained at the time one of the few states where juries could determine sentencing, and in some cases, an uncorrected misconception among juries that parole still existed in Virginia increased the length of sentences imposed on these inmates. As the court's ruling in Fishback v. Commonwealth had no effect on already imposed sentences, it granted no relief to the Fishback inmates. After Northam took office, it was estimated that around 300 of these inmates remained imprisoned, a small portion of them for non-violent felonies.

An effort to extend parole eligibility to the Fishback inmates was undertaken by Northam's gubernatorial predecessor, Terry McAuliffe, but McAuliffe was unable to earn support for such a measure in the state's legislature. Northam continued that effort unsuccessfully for the first two years of his own governorship before achieving results in 2020. Under reform signed by Northam that year, all Fishback inmates still incarcerated became eligible for parole, except for those who had been convicted of a Class 1 felony or the sexual abuse of a minor. By the time Northam signed this bill, the cause of the Fishback inmates had largely won favor among prosecutors in Virginia, according to the Association of Commonwealth's Attorneys. In April of that year, responding to the COVID-19 health pandemic, the Virginia General Assembly adopted an "emergency clause" amendment proposed by Northam to grant parole eligibility to Fishback inmates immediately; new bills are usually enacted on July 1 of each year.

Another piece of parole reform enacted by Northam in 2020 concentrates on juvenile offenders. At the start of Northam's governorship, Virginia law denied parole eligibility to nearly all juvenile offenders sentenced as adults after 1995. Only those sentenced under a youthful offender statute still qualified. This put Virginia in conflict with the 2012 U.S. Supreme Court decision in Miller v. Alabama, which ruled that mandatory life sentences without the possibility of parole are an unconstitutional penalty for juvenile offenders. By 2020, several other states had already adjusted their laws to be compliant with Miller. Virginia's refusal to do so before 2020 led The Washington Post's editorial board to write that Virginia had failed during the preceding years to respect the decision. On February 24, 2020, Northam signed bipartisan legislation making all Virginia inmates convicted as juveniles eligible for parole after serving twenty years of their sentences. This made Virginia the 23rd state to prohibit life sentences without the possibility of parole for juvenile offenders.

A plan to expand geriatric release was also included in Northam's 2020 agenda for criminal justice reform. Under Virginia law, only prisoners older than sixty who have served at least ten years of their sentences or those older than sixty-five who have served at least five years of their sentences qualify for geriatric release. In 2020, Virginia's legislature considered, but did not pass, a bill backed by Northam that would have created two additional categories of inmates eligible for geriatric release: those older than fifty-five who have served at least fifteen years of their sentences and those older than fifty who have served at least twenty years of their sentences.

Before 2020, the Virginia Parole Board could not use terminal illness as a reason to release inmates, although it could advise the governor on offering Executive Medical Clemency to certain inmates estimated to have less than three months to live. This compassionate release policy for terminally ill inmates was the second most restrictive in the country, (Note: Kansas has the most restrictive compassionate release policy for terminally ill patients in the country; the Kansas policy is only available to inmates estimated to have one month or less to live.) and Virginia remains the only state that does not tailor any form of early release to inmates with complex, nonterminal illnesses or permanent disabilities. A bill to establish parole for inmates who are terminally ill or permanently incapacitated was supported by Northam during Virginia's regular legislative session for 2020 and passed in the state Senate but was not passed in the House of Delegates. Later in the year, Northam called a special legislative session partially devoted to criminal justice reform, and during this session, on October 28, he signed a bill allowing the parole board to grant conditional release to terminally ill inmates estimated to have less than twelve months to live; the bill largely excludes inmates convicted of violent crimes.

==== Sentencing and prison reform ====
Although early in his governorship, Northam signed a bill imposing a new mandatory minimum sentence of life in prison for those convicted of murdering a police officer, in May 2019, he vowed not to sign any further legislation imposing mandatory minimum sentences. In an op-ed for The Washington Post, he argued that such legislation is racially discriminatory and leads to over-incarceration.

A year later, Northam signed a law exempting juveniles tried as adults in Virginia from mandatory minimum sentences. That same year, he enacted further reform for juveniles in the Virginia justice system by signing a bill that requires judicial approval for anyone under the age of sixteen to be tried as an adult; Virginia law had previously given prosecutors the discretion to charge anyone fourteen years or older as an adult.

In December 2019, Northam directed the Virginia Department of Corrections to suspend a policy that had allowed strip-searches to be performed on minors during prison visitations. In April 2020, he signed legislation making the suspension of that policy permanent and barring prisons from threatening permanent bans on visitors who refuse to be strip searched. Although it had already been against the policy of the Virginia Department of Corrections to permanently ban visitors who refuse to be strip searched, there had been several instances of prisons threatening such bans.

Another reform signed into law by Northam in 2020 allows judges to dismiss misdemeanor or non-violent felony charges against defendants with autism or an intellectual disability when the court determines that the defendant's criminal conduct was linked to such a disorder or disability and after the defendant has completed a period of probation. That same year, Northam signed a bill tasking the Virginia Department of Corrections with developing accommodations for people with developmental disabilities.

Two bills expanding credit programs for Virginia inmates were signed by Northam in 2020. The first of these allows Virginia inmates to pay fines and court costs with community service credits earned during incarceration. Virginia law had previously allowed these credits to be earned only before or after incarceration. Northam signed the bill in March, saying that it would further prisoner rehabilitation and reintegration into society.

The second of these bills increases the amount of sentence credits that inmates can earn toward early release. When Virginia abolished parole in 1995, it did so as part of a larger "truth in sentencing" initiative that also capped at fifteen percent the amount of time inmates could earn off their sentences through good behavior. The bill signed by Northam raises that cap, although only for certain inmates. Those who qualify can have their sentences reduced by up to a third. Deferred during Virginia's regular legislative session for 2020, the bill was passed and signed later that year, when Northam called a special session partially devoted to revisiting criminal justice reform.

During that same special session, Northam signed a bill allowing defendants convicted by juries in Virginia of non-capital offenses to have their sentences determined by judges. Prior to this bill, juries in Virginia were responsible for determining the sentences of anyone they convicted, and judges rarely exercised their ability to revise jury sentences. The bill signed by Northam gives anyone convicted by a jury in Virginia of a non-capital offense the option to choose between having their sentence determined by a jury or by a judge.

At the time of this reform, Virginia had been the only state in the country, aside from Kentucky, where juries were required (Note: Jury sentencing is also used in Arkansas, Missouri, Oklahoma, and Texas but is not mandatory in those states.) to sentence anyone they convicted. This requirement had been part of Virginia law for over two hundred years. Most Virginia prosecutors opposed lifting the requirement, and the effort to do so failed during Virginia's regular legislative session for 2020, before nearly failing again during the special session. Lifting this requirement was one of the highest priorities during Northam's tenure in office for Virginia's criminal justice reform advocates, who noted that jury sentences are usually much longer than sentences determined by judges and that consequently, before jury sentencing was made optional in Virginia, defendants in the state often took plea deals to avoid jury sentences.

Another bill signed by Northam during the 2020 special legislative session clarifies that prosecutors in Virginia are allowed to dismiss charges against defendants. This had previously been ambiguous under state law. (Note: This bill ensures that prosecutors cannot dismiss charges for reasons of bribery or bias against victims.)

==== Death penalty ====
Ralph Northam opposes the death penalty. On March 24, 2021, he signed a law abolishing the death penalty in Virginia. This made Virginia the 23rd state and 1st state in the South to abolish the death penalty.

==== Writs of actual innocence ====
Another reform enacted by Northam in 2020 eases the petition process for writs of actual innocence. Through this process, which Virginia established in 2004, newly available evidence is examined, and if found exonerating by a court, the petitioner's criminal record is expunged. In its original form, this process was available almost exclusively to petitioners who had pleaded not guilty at trial; among those who had pleaded guilty, the process could be used only by a petitioner who had received a death sentence or whose conviction permitted a life sentence. Prior to the reform enacted under Northam, any failed petition that had been based on nonbiological evidence could not be followed by a new petition also based on nonbiological evidence, and any successful petition had to be found by a court to contain "clear and convincing evidence" that the petitioner had been wrongfully convicted. Under legislation signed by Northam, anyone is allowed to petition for a writ of actual innocence, regardless of how the petitioner pleaded at trial, petitioners are allowed to pursue writs of actual innocence any number of times through the presentation of new evidence that is either biological or nonbiological, and for any petition to succeed, it need only to be supported by "a preponderance of the evidence". By changing "clear and convincing evidence" to "a preponderance of the evidence", Virginia's standard for granting writs of actual innocence was lowered to conform with the standards employed by a majority of other states. An additional bill reforming the writs of actual innocence unanimously passed the state legislature in 2020 and was signed by Northam: it allows private laboratories to test DNA evidence when the Virginia Department of Forensic Science is unable to do so.

==== Police reform ====
In 2020, Northam signed the Virginia Community Policing Act, which bans the practice of bias-based profiling by Virginia police officers and requires those officers to collect demographic information during all traffic stops or investigatory stops that occur in the state. This same law requires all law enforcement agencies in Virginia to collect the number of excessive force complaints that they receive and to report all of this information into a statewide database. Findings from the database are to be shared annually with the Governor, the Attorney General, and the General Assembly.

Later that year, Northam responded to the murder of George Floyd by convening a special legislative session largely devoted to criminal justice reform. During that session, Northam signed several bills enacting police reform in Virginia. These bills banned the use of chokeholds by officers in all situations except for when it is "immediately necessary to protect the law-enforcement officer or another person", introduced a requirement that officers must intervene when witnessing other officers engaged in excessive force, made Virginia the third state–and the first since the killing of Breonna Taylor–to ban no-knock search warrants, introduced requirements that officers be in uniform when serving search warrants and that most search warrants served at night receive authorization from a judge or magistrate, banned officers from making traffic stops for various minor infractions or from conducting searches solely on the basis of smelling marijuana, limited the forms of military equipment attainable by police departments, banned officers from having sexual relations with anyone in their custody, established Virginia's first statewide code of conduct for officers and a statewide, standardized training curriculum for officers, provided for the state-level decertification of officers who engage in misconduct, granted the state Attorney General the power to conduct investigations of local police departments, granted localities the right to establish civilian review boards with subpoena and disciplinary powers, and created what is known as the MARCUS Alert system, which provides for mental health professionals to accompany police officers who are responding to mental health crises.

The restrictions placed on warrants apply only to search warrants and not to arrest warrants. The restrictions on traffic stops were enacted to reduce pretextual stops. The state's standardized training curriculum includes a focus on racial bias, mental illness, de-escalation, and crisis intervention. The civilian review boards are optional for localities and have oversight of police departments but do not have oversight of sheriff's departments.

==== Repeal of unconstitutional prohibitions ====
On March 4, 2020, Northam signed legislation repealing three Virginia laws that courts had already ruled to be unconstitutional: a law prohibiting the possession, consumption, or purchase of alcohol by anyone that a court rules to be a "habitual drunkard"; a law prohibiting premarital sex; and a law prohibiting the public use of profanity. Although none of these laws were enforced with regularity by 2020, each of them continued to be enforced to some extent either until or nearly until they were repealed. In the same year that Northam repealed these laws, he also repealed Virginia's unconstitutional Jim Crow laws, which by that time, had already been long unenforced.

Virginia's law regulating "habitual drunkards", first introduced in the 1870s, was enforced until 2019, when it was ruled unconstitutional by the U.S. Court of Appeals for the Fourth Circuit. Prior to that ruling, Virginia had been the only state aside from Utah suspending the drinking rights of people designated "habitual drunkards". Virginia law still allows courts to suspend the drinking rights of individuals convicted of drunk driving. The "habitual drunkard" designation had often been used to jail homeless people in Virginia. Those who received this designation in Virginia and subsequently violated the associated restrictions placed upon them could face up to a year in jail and a maximum fine of $2,500. These same penalties applied to anyone with the aforementioned designation who appeared publicly intoxicated. (Note: Under a separate law, anyone in Virginia can still be charged with a misdemeanor for public intoxication, but violation of this law cannot result in jail time.) In the final years before this law was overturned, it had been enforced primarily in Virginia Beach. The only other Virginia city that made significant use of the law in its final years had been Roanoke.

Virginia's law banning fornication was ruled unconstitutional by the Virginia Supreme Court in 2005. At that time, CNN reported that the law "had not been enforced criminally against a consenting adult since the middle of the 19th century", although in 2014, The Virginian-Pilot reported that small numbers of people continued to be convicted of fornication in Virginia even after the aforementioned 2005 ruling. In 2020, Mark Levine, who introduced the bill to repeal the law, explained that 21st-century fornication charges generally resulted from plea deals or from instances in which the defendants were already charged with other crimes.

According to The Washington Post, Virginia's law banning public profanity dates back to at least 1860. CNN dates the law even earlier, to the late eighteenth century. Although the U.S. Supreme Court ruled such laws unconstitutional in 1971, Virginia's ban on public profanity continued to be enforced in rare instances up until the law was repealed in 2020. Before this law was repealed, public profanity had been a misdemeanor in Virginia and carried a maximum fine of $250. The same classification and penalty had applied to Virginia's ban on fornication.

=== Economy ===
Northam supports increasing Virginia's minimum wage, which at $7.25 an hour, has not surpassed the federally mandated level set in 2009. While serving as lieutenant governor in 2014, Northam broke a tie in the Virginia state Senate, passing a bill that would have increased the state's minimum wage by increments. Under the bill, the state's minimum wage would have settled at $9.25 an hour, after two years. The measure was never enacted due to failing in the Virginia House of Delegates. Three years later, as a gubernatorial candidate, Northam proposed that Virginia set its minimum wage at $15 an hour (Note: Northam's Democratic primary opponent, Tom Perriello, had adopted the same position one day before Northam.) and expressed plans to campaign as governor against Republican state legislators who continued to oppose a higher minimum wage. Northam has pointed to the costliness of transportation in rural parts of the state to dispute the notion that a $15 minimum wage is too high for those areas. During Northam's first year as governor, he vetoed a bill passed by the Republican-controlled legislature that would have banned localized minimum wages for government contractors.

During his 2017 campaign for governor, Northam was endorsed by the Laborers' International Union of North America; the union praised Northam for his opposition to a "right-to-work" amendment to the Virginia state constitution. Northam criticized the partial repeal of the car tax under former Governor Jim Gilmore because of its impact on both K-12 and higher education, saying Virginia still has not recovered.

Northam "has called for phasing out the grocery tax on low-income people and ending business taxes in struggling rural areas." He has called for a bipartisan reform commission to make recommendations on state tax policy.

=== Education ===
Northam supports funding public schools. Northam opposes publicly funding private schools.

In August 2019, Northam established a commission to develop new guidelines for teaching African American history in Virginia. Explaining that his primary goal for the commission is to help Virginia students understand the ways that black oppression continued in America after slavery, Northam said, "I think a lot of us need to understand that concept a lot better and this needs to start with the education of our children. Black oppression is alive and well today, it's just in a different form."

==== G3 initiative for state-funded tertiary education ====
While campaigning for governor, Northam proposed a plan for Virginia to offer free community college and workforce training to students in high-demand fields who commit to a period of public service. Northam has called this plan "Get Skilled, Get a Job, Give Back", or "G3" for short, and as governor, he has included G3 as part of his two-year budget proposal, which will be considered in the 2020 legislative session.

For students participating in G3, the state of Virginia would cover educational expenses that remain after other forms of financial aid have been used; as such, G3 has been described as a "last-dollar" program. It would only be available to students from low-income and middle-income households; the estimated cut-off would be about 400% of the federal poverty level, although this could vary depending upon a household's overall ability to afford costs. While participating in G3, students would have to maintain at least a 2.0 GPA and would be required to have a three-year graduation plan. Only students eligible for in-state tuition would qualify for the program. According to Inside Higher Ed and The Free Lance-Star, G3 is one of the few free tuition programs in the United States available to students of all ages. Returning students, part-time students, and dual enrollment students are all allowed to participate in the program.

Under G3, the cost of tuition, fees, and books would all be covered, and students receiving Pell Grants would qualify for additional aid. Community colleges would earn a $500 financial incentive for each of their G3-participating students receiving a full Pell Grant who completes 30 credits, and an additional $400 financial incentive would be earned by the community college once each of those same students completes an associate degree.

There are no fixed fields of study that would be included within the G3 program; rather, different fields of study could be included on a changing basis, as determined by economic projections and employer needs. Cybersecurity, coding, clean energy, early childhood education, health care, public safety, and skilled trades are some of the fields of study identified for inclusion.

Students participating in G3 would be required to fulfill two hours (Note: Northam's original proposal for G3, made during his gubernatorial campaign, would have required participating students to perform one year of paid public service.) of public service, community service, or work experience for each of their academic credit hours. This requirement could be fulfilled through taking a position with local or state government, joining a nonprofit organization, or working in one of Virginia's economically depressed regions.

=== Environment and energy ===
Northam accepts the scientific consensus on climate change and as a candidate for governor vowed to lead efforts to fight climate change. He pledged, if elected, to bring Virginia into the United States Climate Alliance, a multi-state agreement to uphold greenhouse gas emissions standards. Northam has emphasized the negative effects of climate-change-induced sea level rise on Virginia's Tidewater region.

During his 2017 campaign for governor, Northam pledged if elected to continue implementing the total maximum daily load limits for nitrogen and phosphorus discharges into Chesapeake Bay, a policy that had reduced harmful algal blooms. Northam said he would continue this policy even if the federal government under Donald Trump cut or eliminated funding for the program. During his campaign, Northam was endorsed by the Virginia League of Conservation Voters and the Virginia Sierra Club.

Northam has offered conditional support for the proposed Atlantic Coast Pipeline, provided that the pipeline's construction is deemed to be environmentally safe. He has avoided taking a firm stance on other pipelines such as the Mountain Valley Pipeline. He opposes both offshore drilling and fracking.

Northam has supported the Regional Greenhouse Gas Initiative (RGGI). In 2019, he vetoed a bill that would have prohibited Virginia from entering into the initiative, but in May 2019, he chose not to veto language in the state budget that prohibits spending related to the initiative, because under Virginia law, governors are generally not allowed to issue line-item vetoes of the state budget. According to The Washington Post, had Northam issued the veto, it could have been challenged in court by the Republican-controlled legislature, and Northam wanted to avoid a long legal confrontation. Northam has said that he will seek to implement RGGI spending in future budgets.

In September 2019, Northam signed an executive order establishing a goal for the commonwealth to produce at least 30 percent of its energy from renewable sources in 10 years, a 23 percent improvement on the amount produced at the time he signed the order. In addition to this, Northam set the goal for the state of Virginia to produce 100 percent of its electricity from carbon-free sources by 2050.

=== Family leave and child care ===
When Northam was inaugurated as governor, the family leave policy for executive branch employees in the state of Virginia applied exclusively to employees who had given birth and offered only partial pay. In June 2018, Northam signed an executive order extending the policy to apply to both mothers and fathers, including not only biological parents but also adoptive and foster parents. Under the new policy, employees receive eight weeks off at full pay. Earlier in the year, then-Speaker of the House of Delegates Republican Kirk Cox had established a similar policy offering legislative branch employees twelve weeks of paid leave.

With regards to private sector employees, Northam has said that he wants to implement tax credits for small businesses that offer paid family leave.

In 2018, Northam formed a commission to study the possibility of offering child care to state employees in Richmond. Northam's wife, Pam, serves on the panel.

=== Guns ===
While campaigning for governor, Northam called for new gun control measures in Virginia and often spoke about the issue within the context of his experience treating gunshot victims. He then made gun control a priority during his administration. In the 2019 legislative session, Northam introduced gun control measures that failed in the Republican-controlled General Assembly. After a mass shooting in Virginia Beach that killed 12 people, Northam convened a special legislative session to reconsider gun control legislation, but the General Assembly adjourned after 90 minutes without considering any bills.

Gun-control measures were then central to the Democratic platform during Virginia's 2019 legislative midterm elections. Democrats won control of both chambers in the state legislature during those elections, and in April 2020, Northam signed a package of five gun control measures into law. The package included universal background checks for gun sales in Virginia; a limit of one-per-month on the purchase of handguns; a requirement for the loss or theft of a firearm to be reported within 48 hours (with a civil penalty of up to $250 for failure to report); an increase in penalties for reckless storage of loaded and unsecured firearms in a way that endangers children under 14 years of age; and an extreme risk protection order (red flag) bill, which provides for a procedure for the temporary removal of guns from people at high risk of self-harm or harm to others. Two additional gun-control bills signed that year include amendments proposed by Northam: one of those bills requires evidence that anyone subject to a protective order has surrendered their firearms within twenty-four hours and was amended so that those who fail to comply would be found in contempt of court; the other bill, which allows for municipal regulations of firearms in public buildings, parks, recreation centers, and during public events, was amended to create an exemption for institutions of higher learning.

The package of gun control legislation supported by Northam in 2020 included an eighth bill that did not pass: it would have banned assault weapons, high-capacity magazines, trigger activators, (Note: Under President Trump, the executive branch of the federal government issued a ban against trigger activators. Several states have sought to codify their own bans on the devices, so as not to be reliant on federal policy.) and silencers. The ban on assault weapons would not have applied to firearms already owned in Virginia.

The bill limiting handgun purchases to one-a-month reinstates a law that had been repealed in 2012 under then-governor Bob McDonnell; it had originally been passed in 1993 under then-governor Douglas Wilder. Virginia was the nineteenth state to pass a red flag law.

=== Healthcare ===
Northam supports the Affordable Care Act ("Obamacare"), although he has argued that it is in need of improvement. After Republican attempts to repeal the law, Northam called for members of Congress to "put a stop to the uncertainty and work on stabilizing and building on the Affordable Care Act's progress."

Northam opposes a single-payer healthcare system in Virginia, preferring that such a plan be run by the federal government, but supports the creation of a state-run public health insurance option.

On February 21, 2019, Northam signed a bipartisan bill raising the smoking age in Virginia from 18 to 21. (Note: Military service members are exempted from the bill.)

As governor, Northam has proposed a state budget that would direct $22 million towards closing the racial disparity in Virginia's maternal mortality rate. The plan developed by Northam would aim to eliminate the disparity by 2025. It would also aim to reduce infant mortality in Virginia. Northam's proposed funding would allow women who qualify for Medicaid solely because of pregnancy to remain covered for a full year after childbirth – Virginia's current policy allows such coverage to last for sixty days after childbirth – and would allow Medicaid to cover home visitation services for new mothers. Other initiatives that would be covered by the funding include expanding access to contraceptives for poor women in Virginia and expanding access to addiction treatment for mothers in the state. Northam has also suggested allowing doulas to be covered by Medicaid in Virginia.

==== Medicaid expansion ====
On June 7, 2018, Northam signed a bipartisan bill expanding Medicaid in Virginia. This fulfilled one of his central campaign promises. Northam's predecessor, Terry McAuliffe, had tried to implement Medicaid expansion throughout his term, but was blocked by Republicans, who controlled the state legislature at the time and opposed the expansion. Following the 2017 election, which brought significant gains for Democrats in the Virginia House of Delegates, Republicans still held a narrow legislative majority, but opposition to Medicaid expansion had diminished among Republicans, and several crossed over in support of the bill. Once the bill was enacted on January 1, 2019, Virginia became the 33rd state to expand Medicaid and the first to do so since Louisiana in 2016. Enrollment in the expanded program began on November 1, 2018. By the beginning of 2019, more than 200,000 Virginians had enrolled in Medicaid as part of the expansion.

As part of a compromise with Republican legislators, Northam agreed to a Medicaid expansion plan that would include a work requirement for most able-bodied, childless adults. The work requirement has not taken effect, as it cannot be implemented without a waiver from the federal government. Northam's administration initially sought such a waiver, but following Virginia's 2019 midterm elections, in which Democrats took control of the state legislature, Northam paused Virginia's request for the waiver, which at the time was still pending.

=== Immigration ===
In his 2007 campaign for state Senate, Northam "advocated for Virginia being 'even more stringent than we are now in fighting illegal immigration,' and said the state should act as 'strong partners' with federal law enforcement." Northam's rhetoric shifted in his 2017 gubernatorial campaign. In 2017 Northam pledged to "stand up against ICE" so that "people, especially immigrants, in Virginia aren't living in fear," saying: "Something that we are very proud of in Virginia is that we are inclusive." He continued by saying "We will do everything we can to make sure immigrants are comfortable living here." Northam opposed President Trump's decision to rescind Deferred Action for Childhood Arrivals (DACA), which offered temporary stay for unauthorized immigrants who came to the United States as minors. Northam said Trump's decision "lacks compassion, lacks moral sense, and lacks economic sense." Northam supports granting state driver's licenses and in-state tuition to undocumented immigrants.

In February 2017, while serving as lieutenant governor, Northam cast a tie-breaking vote in the state Senate against a bill to ban sanctuary cities in Virginia. Northam said he was "proud to break a tie when Republicans tried to scapegoat immigrants for political gain" and that he was "glad to put a stop to" the bill. In an October 2017 gubernatorial debate, Northam said he did not support sanctuary cities, stating that there currently were none in Virginia, but Northam declined to say whether he would sign a bill as governor that was similar to the one he voted against in the Senate. In November 2017, Northam clarified that while he would veto any bill pre-emptively banning sanctuary cities in Virginia, he would support a ban, if sanctuary cities began appearing in the state. In April 2018, as governor, Northam vetoed a law that would have pre-emptively banned sanctuary cities in Virginia. He vetoed the same legislation again the following year.

In November 2019, after President Donald Trump issued an executive order allowing states and localities to abstain from refugee resettlement programs, Northam affirmed Virginia's commitment to accepting refugees, writing to Trump's Secretary of State Mike Pompeo, "Virginia's lights are on and our doors are open, and we welcome new Virginians to make their homes here...The United States has long presented itself as a haven, a place of stability and economic prosperity. We promote the ideals upon which this country was founded, of liberty and freedom. But to uphold those ideals abroad, we must allow access to them here at home. We must practice what we preach."

=== LGBTQ rights ===
Northam has supported LGBT rights throughout his political career. While running for lieutenant governor in 2013, he criticized his Republican opponent, E. W. Jackson, for making what were widely considered to be divisive statements about LGBT individuals. During a debate with Jackson, who is a minister, Northam said, "What I do in church translates to what I do in everyday life. Whether it's said in my church or whether it's said in my medical clinic or whether it's said before the Senate, it's on me and it's what I believe in." That summer, when the United States Defense Department began offering marriage benefits to military personnel in same-sex relationships, Northam and Jackson disagreed with each other on the issue. Jackson said that because gay marriage was illegal in Virginia at the time, the state should withhold benefits from gay couples serving in its National Guard, while Northam supported the federal policy. Northam said that equalizing benefits for gay couples in the United States military is about "being fair with those who have served our country."

During the 2013 campaign, Northam said that opposition to LGBT rights would create an unwelcoming business environment in Virginia. In 2015, he used his tie-breaking abilities as lieutenant governor to defeat a bill in the state Senate that would have forced Virginia Attorney General Mark Herring to defend the state's gay marriage ban; Herring had argued that the ban was unconstitutional.

In 2017, while running for governor, Northam spoke against the Physical Privacy Act, a bill proposed that year in Virginia, which if passed, would have required people in government facilities to use restrooms corresponding to the gender specified on their original birth certificates. Northam called the Physical Privacy Act a "job-killing, prejudicial bill". Later that same year, before Northam was elected governor, the Physical Privacy Act was defeated in the state legislature.

Northam condemned the decision by President Donald Trump to ban transgender service members from the United States military. Shortly after Trump announced this policy, Northam tweeted, "Anyone who wants to serve our country in the military should be welcomed. They're patriots and should be treated as such."

Northam's first official action as governor was to sign an executive order banning the executive branch of the state government from discriminating against LGBTQ employees. At the time of Northam's inauguration, the state of Virginia did not have any legislation protecting LGBTQ individuals from employment discrimination. Protections on the bases of sexual orientation and gender identity that had been established through an executive order issued by Northam's gubernatorial predecessor, Terry McAuliffe, (Note: Protection from employment discrimination on the basis of sexual orientation was first introduced in the executive branch of the Virginia state government through a 2005 executive order issued by then-governor Mark Warner.: The protection was maintained by Warner's gubernatorial successor, Tim Kaine but was then repealed in 2010 by Kaine's own successor, Bob McDonnell. In 2014, McAuliffe re-instated the policy and expanded it to include, for the first time in Virginia, protection on the basis of gender identity.) were maintained by Northam's own executive order, which went further, introducing, for the first time in Virginia, protection on the basis of gender expression.

While serving as lieutenant governor, Northam broke a tie in the state Senate, supporting a bill that would have codified into state law the protections included in McAuliffe's aforementioned executive order. This bill was defeated in the House of Delegates. Legislation that would have codified Northam's own executive order into state law passed with bipartisan support in the state Senate during 2018 and 2019, but was denied a vote both years by Republican leadership in the House of Delegates. If passed, these bills would have applied to all state and local government employees in Virginia, unlike the aforementioned executive orders, which applied only to employees under the governor's personal authority.

An even more expansive anti-discrimination law, the Virginia Values Act, was passed in Virginia with bipartisan support, after the state's 2019 legislative elections flipped control of both the state Senate and the House of Delegates from Republicans to Democrats. Northam signed the Virginia Values Act into law on April 11, 2020. The bill, which bans discrimination throughout Virginia on the bases of sexual orientation and gender identity in both public sector and private sector employment, housing, public accommodations, and credit transactions, is the first legislation in any southern state to extend anti-discrimination protections to LGBTQ individuals.

In 2020, Northam signed legislation expanding gender identity-related rights and protections in Virginia. Northam approved bills barring health insurance companies in the state from discriminating on the basis of gender identity; establishing a statewide standard for the treatment of transgender students in Virginia schools; (Note: This bill tasked the Virginia Department of Education with setting statewide standards for the treatment of transgender students and allows additional protections to be added by Virginia school districts. The statewide standards were adopted during the 2021–22 school year.) introducing a non-binary gender option on Virginia driver's licenses and IDs; and removing gender reassignment surgery as a prerequisite in Virginia for those seeking to change the sex listed on their birth certificates.

In March 2020, Northam signed a bipartisan bill that made Virginia the twentieth state and first southern state to ban conversion therapy for minors. Upon signing the bill, Northam issued a statement saying, "This issue is personal for me, as a pediatric neurologist who has cared for thousands of children. Conversion therapy is not only based in discriminatory junk-science, it is dangerous and causes lasting harm to our youth. No one should be made to feel wrong for who they are - especially not a child." Days later, Northam signed a bill classifying crimes targeting a victim on the basis of sexual orientation or gender identity as hate crimes. That same year, Northam signed bills repealing the state legal code of Virginia's (Note: Before this bill was enacted, Virginia's ban on same-sex marriage was included in the state legal code and in an amendment to the state constitution. Although this bill repeals the ban only from the state legal code, both bans became unenforceable in 2014.) unenforceable ban on same-sex marriage; adopting gender-neutral language for spouses throughout state law; and allowing municipalities in Virginia to pass their own laws banning discrimination on the bases of sexual orientation and gender identity.

=== Marijuana ===
In May 2020, when Democrats had fresh control of Virginia's state legislature, Northam signed a law decriminalizing marijuana for adult use. Democrats had attempted to pass legislation legalizing it in years past, but had failed every time. It was decriminalized in July 2020, but by then, the state's Democratic Party and Northam had explained that it was not enough–that racial disparities would continue to deepen with just a $25 fine. Following this revelation, he voiced his intent to introduce a bill to legalize it fully. It initially passed with an effective date of July 2024, which Northam and the Virginia ACLU quickly said was not enough. He sent the bill back to the General Assembly, asking for amendments to move the date up to July 2021. The bill was amended and signed by Northam in April 2021, including a provision requested by him making underage possession a civil fine with a substance abuse class. Dispensaries will open on the original date in 2024, while up to four plants can be grown inside the home in 2021.

=== Donald Trump ===
In a political ad run during the 2017 Virginia Democratic primary, Northam said, "I've been listening carefully to Donald Trump, and I think he's a narcissistic maniac." As the general election drew near Northam said, "[I]f Donald Trump is helping Virginia, I'll work with him." Northam explained the "softer tone": "I think people already know [their opinions of Trump] and they are judging for themselves. What we are talking about as we move forward are the policies that are coming out of Washington that are so detrimental to Virginia".

=== Voting rights, campaign law, and redistricting ===
During his 2017 campaign for governor, Northam said that if elected, he would approve a map of new Virginia legislative and congressional boundaries in the post-2020 redistricting only if it is drawn by a nonpartisan commission.

In January 2019, Northam introduced legislation including bills to end Virginia's photo ID law and a bill to allow absentee "no-excuse" voting to replace the current law which contains limits. He is also proposing new campaign finance limits that would block direct donations from corporations, cap donations at $10,000, and prohibit the personal use of campaign funds by lawmakers.

In October 2019, Northam announced that he had restored the voting rights and other civil rights of more than 22,000 felons who had completed their sentences.

In March 2021, he approved the Voting Rights Act of Virginia.

== Personal life ==
Northam and his wife Pam have two adult children, Wes and Aubrey. Northam's brother, Thomas Northam, is a lawyer and the law partner of Virginia State Senate member Lynwood Lewis, who was elected to the State Senate to replace Northam when he resigned his State Senate seat to assume the position of lieutenant governor. Their father, Wescott Northam, is a retired Accomack County judge, former Commonwealth's Attorney, and Navy veteran.

Northam belongs to a predominately black Baptist church in Capeville, Virginia and serves as the vice chair of the Fort Monroe Authority, which oversees Fort Monroe, a Civil War historic site where Union General Benjamin Butler sheltered freed slaves. In his free time, Northam enjoys working on classic cars. He owns a 1953 Oldsmobile and a 1971 Chevrolet Corvette.

Northam is a recreational runner and a competitor in races including the Richmond Road Runners' First Day 5k and the Monument Avenue 10K race.

== Electoral history ==
Virginia State Senate 6th district election, 2007
Party	Candidate	Votes	%	±%
Democratic	Ralph Northam	17,307	54.3%	+16.1
Republican	Nick Rerras	14,499	45.5%	–16.2
Write-ins		45	0.1%	+0.1
Majority		2,808	8.8%	–14.7
Total votes		31,851	100.0%	

Virginia State Senate 6th district election, 2011
Party	Candidate	Votes	%	±%
Democratic	Ralph Northam	16,606	56.8%	+2.4
Republican	Benito Loyola Jr.	12,622	43.1%	–3.4
Write-ins		31	0.1%	<–0.1
Majority		3,984	13.6%	+4.8
Total votes		29,259	100.0%	

Virginia Lieutenant Governor Democratic primary, 2013
Party	Candidate	Votes	%
Democratic	Ralph Northam	78,476	54.2%
Democratic	Aneesh Chopra	66,380	45.8%
Majority		12,096	8.4%
Total votes		144,856	100.0%

Virginia lieutenant gubernatorial election, 2013
Party	Candidate	Votes	%	±%
Democratic	Ralph Northam	1,213,155	55.1%	+11.7
Republican	E. W. Jackson	980,257	44.5%	–12.0
Write-ins		7,472	0.3%	+0.3
Majority		232,898	10.6%	
Total votes		2,200,884	100.0%	

Virginia Governor Democratic primary election, 2017
Party	Candidate	Votes	%
Democratic	Ralph Northam	303,399	55.9%
Democratic	Tom Perriello	239,216	44.1%
Majority		64,183	11.8%
Total votes		542,615	100.0%

Virginia gubernatorial election, 2017
Party	Candidate	Votes	%
Democratic	Ralph Northam	1,405,175	53.9%
Republican	Ed Gillespie	1,173,209	45.0%
Libertarian	Cliff Hyra	27,964	1.1%
Majority		231,966	8.9%
Total votes		2,607,725	100.0%

== Footnotes ==
Political offices
Preceded by Bill Bolling	Lieutenant Governor of Virginia; 2014–2018	Succeeded by Justin Fairfax
Preceded by Terry McAuliffe	Governor of Virginia; 2018–2022	Succeeded by Glenn Youngkin
Party political offices
Preceded by Terry McAuliffe	Democratic nominee for Governor of Virginia; 2017	Succeeded by Terry McAuliffe
U.S. order of precedence (ceremonial)
Preceded by Terry McAuliffe as Former Governor	Order of precedence of the United States	Succeeded by Glenn Youngkin as Former Governor
