= Virginia's 6th Senate district =

American legislative district

Virginia's 6th State Senate district
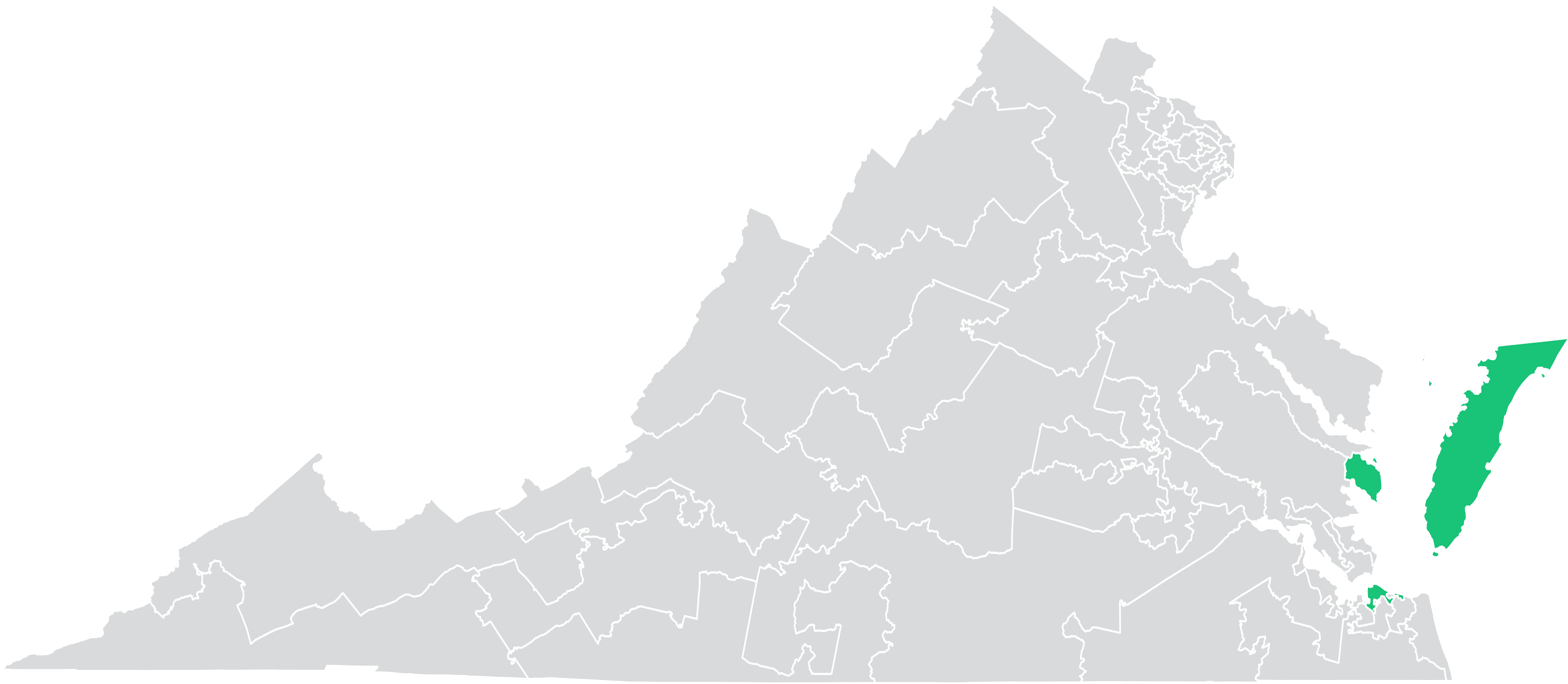
Senator
Todd Pillion; R–Abingdon
- Demographics: 58% White; 26% Black; 9% Hispanic; 3% Asian; 3% Other
- Population (2019): 194,890
- Registered voters: 108,287

Virginia's 6th Senate district is one of 40 districts in the Senate of Virginia. The new 2021 redistricting has moved the designation of 6th Senate District to far southwestern Virginia.

Before the recent redistricting, the old district had been represented by Democrat Lynwood Lewis since his victory in a highly contested 2014 special election to succeed fellow Democrat Ralph Northam, who was elected Lieutenant Governor of Virginia. Currently, the district is represented by Republican Todd E. Pillion, and has been since 2024.

== Geography ==
District 6 is located in the extreme southwestern portion of Virginia, including the counties of Buchanan, Dickenson, Lee, Russell, Scott, Washington, and Wise.The independent cities that are part of District 6 include Bristol and Norton.

The district overlaps with Virginia's 9th congressional district, and with the 43rd, 44th, and 45th districts of the Virginia House of Delegates.

== Recent election results ==
=== 2019 ===
2019 Virginia Senate election, District 6
Primary election
Party	Candidate	Votes	%
Democratic	Lynwood Lewis (incumbent)	4,559	70.6
Democratic	Willie Randall	1,899	29.4
Total votes		6,459	100
General election
Democratic	Lynwood Lewis (incumbent)	25,772	59.7
Republican	Elizabeth Lankford	17,357	40.2
Total votes		43,198	100
Democratic hold			

=== 2015 ===
2015 Virginia Senate election, District 6
Party	Candidate	Votes	%
Democratic	Lynwood Lewis (incumbent)	16,738	59.5
Republican	Richard Ottinger	11,386	40.4
Total votes		28,153	100
Democratic hold			

=== 2014 special ===
2014 Virginia Senate special election, District 6
Party	Candidate	Votes	%
Democratic	Lynwood Lewis	10,201	50.0
Republican	Wayne Coleman	10,192	50.0
Total votes		20,401	100
Democratic hold			

=== 2011 ===
2011 Virginia Senate election, District 6
Party	Candidate	Votes	%
Democratic	Ralph Northam (incumbent)	16,606	56.8
Republican	Benito Loyola, Jr.	12,622	43.1
Total votes		29,259	100
Democratic hold			

=== Federal and statewide results ===
Year	Office	Results
2020	President	Biden 57.1–41.1%
2017	Governor	Northam 58.2–40.6%
2016	President	Clinton 53.4–41.3%
2014	Senate	Warner 52.7–44.5%
2013	Governor	McAuliffe 52.7–40.6%
2012	President	Obama 56.7–42.0%
2012	Senate	Kaine 58.4–41.6%

== Historical results ==
All election results below took place prior to 2011 redistricting, and thus were under different district lines.

=== 2007 ===
2007 Virginia Senate election, District 6
Party	Candidate	Votes	%
Democratic	Ralph Northam	17,307	54.3
Republican	Nick Rerras (incumbent)	14,499	45.5
Total votes		31,851	100
Democratic gain from Republican			

=== 2003 ===
2003 Virginia Senate election, District 6
Party	Candidate	Votes	%
Republican	Nick Rerras (incumbent)	15,771	61.7
Democratic	Andrew Protogyrou	9,775	38.2
Total votes		25,560	100
Republican hold			

=== 1999 ===
1999 Virginia Senate election, District 6
Party	Candidate	Votes	%
Republican	Nick Rerras	11,621	59.3
Democratic	Stanley C. Walker (incumbent)	7,966	40.7
Total votes		19,591	100
Republican gain from Democratic			

=== 1995 ===
1995 Virginia Senate election, District 6
Party	Candidate	Votes	%
Democratic	Stanley C. Walker (incumbent)	10,917	54.9
Republican	Nick Rerras	8,979	45.1
Total votes		19,901	100
Democratic hold			

== District officeholders since 1940 ==
Years	Senator, District 6	Counties/Cities in District
1940	Robert W. Daniel (D)	Greensvile County, Prince George County, Surry County, Sussex County and the City of Hopewell
1941–1944	Garland Gray (D)	Greensvile County, Prince George County, Surry County, Sussex County and the City of Hopewell
1944–1948	Garland Gray (D)	Greensvile County, Prince George County, Surry County, Sussex County and the City of Hopewell
1948–1952	Garland Gray (D)	Greensvile County, Prince George County, Surry County, Sussex County and the City of Hopewell
1952–1956	Garland Gray (D)	Greensvile County, Prince George County, Surry County, Sussex County and the City of Hopewell
1956–1960	Garland Gray (D)	Greensvile County, Prince George County, Surry County, Sussex County and the City of Hopewell
1960–1964	Garland Gray (D)	Greensvile County, Prince George County, Surry County, Sussex County and the City of Hopewell
1964–1966	Garland Gray (D)	Greensvile County, Prince George County, Surry County, Sussex County and the City of Hopewell
1966–1968	Garland Gray (D)	Greensvile County, James City County, Prince George County, Surry County, Sussex County, the City of Hopewell, and the City of Williamsburg
1968–1972	Garland Gray (D)	Greensvile County, James City County, Prince George County, Surry County, Sussex County, the City of Emporia, the City of Hopewell, and the City of Williamsburg
1972–1976	Stanley C. Walker (D); Peter K. Babalas (D); Thomas McNamara (D)	City of Norfolk, City of Virginia Beach (part)
1976–1980	Stanley C. Walker (D); Peter K. Babalas (D); Joseph T. Fitzpatrick (D)	City of Norfolk, City of Virginia Beach (part)
1980–1984	Stanley C. Walker (D)	City of Norfolk (part)
1984–1988	Stanley C. Walker (D)	City of Norfolk (part)
1988–1992	Stanley C. Walker (D)	City of Norfolk (part)
1992–1996	Stanley C. Walker (D)	City of Norfolk (part), City of Virginia Beach (part)
1996–2000	Stanley C. Walker (D)	City of Norfolk (part), City of Virginia Beach (part)
2000–2004	Nick Rerras (R)	City of Norfolk (part), City of Virginia Beach (part)
2004–2008	Nick Rerras (R)	Accomack County, Mathews County, Northampton County, City of Norfolk (part), City of Virginia Beach (part)
2008–2012	Ralph Northam (D)	Accomack County, Mathews County, Northampton County, City of Norfolk (part), City of Virginia Beach (part)
2012–2013	Ralph Northam (D)	Accomack County, Mathews County, Northampton County, City of Norfolk (part), City of Virginia Beach (part)
2014–2016	Lynwood Lewis (D)	Accomack County, Mathews County, Northampton County, City of Norfolk (part), City of Virginia Beach (part)
2016–present	Lynwood Lewis (D)	Accomack County, Mathews County, Northampton County, City of Norfolk (part), City of Virginia Beach (part)
