= Toy D. Savage Jr. =

American politician (1921–2017)

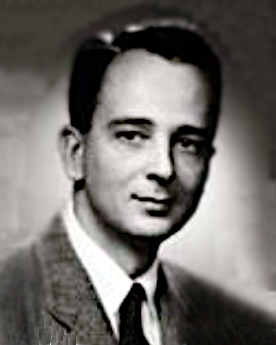

Member of the Virginia House of Delegates from the Norfolk City district
- In office January 13, 1954 – January 8, 1964
- Succeeded by: Stanley C. Walker

Personal details
- Born: Toy Dixon Savage Jr. October 12, 1921 Norfolk, Virginia, US
- Died: December 7, 2017 (aged 96) Norfolk, Virginia, U.S.
- Resting place: Forest Lawn Cemetery
- Party: Democratic
- Spouses: Mary Hunter Hankins (m. 1946; died 2003); Eleanor Rosalie Funkhouser
- Children: 2
- Education: University of Virginia (BA; University of Virginia School of Law (LLB)
- Occupation: Politician; lawyer

Military service
- Allegiance: United States
- Branch/service: United States Navy
- Rank: Lieutenant
- Battles/wars: World War II

Toy Dixon Savage Jr. (October 12, 1921 – December 7, 2017) was an American lawyer and politician who represented Norfolk in the Virginia House of Delegates.

== Early life ==
Toy Dixon Savage Jr. was born on October 12, 1921, in Norfolk, Virginia, to Hildreth (née Gatewood) and Toy Dixon Savage. His father was a lawyer in Norfolk. His grandfather was Commodore James Duncan Gatewood. He attended public schools in Norfolk, Norfolk Academy and Woodberry Forest School. He graduated from the University of Virginia with a Bachelor of Arts in 1943 and later a Bachelor of Laws at the University of Virginia School of Law.

== Career ==
Savage was a lawyer and was president of the Virginia Bar Association from 1969 to 1970. He was a founder of the law firm Willcox Savage. He served in the United States Navy Reserve in World War II and attained the rank of lieutenant.

Savage was a Democrat. He served in the Virginia House of Delegates, representing Norfolk, from 1954 to 1963.

== Personal life ==
Savage married Mary Hunter Hankins, daughter of Nell Agnes (née Taylor) and Thornton Wilson Hankins, of Fordwick, Virginia, on October 19, 1946. He had two children, Tracy and Toy III. His wife died in 2003. He also married Eleanor Rosalie. He was a Baptist. He lived at Greenway Court in Norfolk.

Savage died on December 7, 2017, and was interred in Forest Lawn Cemetery.
