= Stanley C. Walker =

American politician

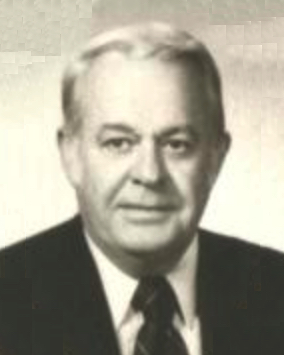

President pro tempore of the Virginia Senate
- In office January 13, 1988 – January 12, 2000
- Preceded by: Bill Parkerson
- Succeeded by: John Chichester

Member of the Virginia Senate from the 6th district
- In office January 12, 1972 – January 12, 2000; 5th/6th/7th: January 12, 1972 – January 11, 1984
- Preceded by: Garland Gray
- Succeeded by: Nick Rerras

Member of the Virginia House of Delegates from Norfolk City
- In office January 8, 1964 – January 12, 1972
- Preceded by: Toy D. Savage Jr.
- Succeeded by: Albert Teich Jr.

Personal details
- Born: Stanley Clay Walker; July 2, 1923 Norfolk, Virginia, U.S.
- Died: January 15, 2001 (aged 77) Norfolk, Virginia, U.S.
- Party: Democratic
- Spouse: Sybil Bruce Moore

Military service
- Allegiance: United States
- Branch/service: United States Army
- Years of service: 1942–1945
- Battles/wars: World War II

Stanley Clay Walker (July 2, 1923 – January 15, 2001) was a long-time Democratic politician, elected in 1963 to represent Norfolk, Virginia as a delegate to the Virginia General Assembly, and in 1971 winning election to represent the city and surrounding areas in the Virginia Senate, at first from the 5th district and after redistricting following the 1980 census representing the 6th district. In 1988, Walker rose to become president pro tempore of the Virginia Senate, holding that position until his forced retirement in 2000, Democrats having lost their majority in the House for the first time in 116 years in the 1999 Virginia state elections.

== Early life ==
Walker was born on July 2, 1923, in Norfolk. He graduated from Fork Union Military Academy, and was sent to the European Theatre in World War II at the age of 18 serving in an ordnance unit of the 82nd Airborne Division.

== Political career ==
In 1959, as racial desegregation of the public schools was being fought out in Virginia, Walker was appointed to the Norfolk School Board, "where he was a voice of moderation in the often perilous efforts to integrate the public schools."

In 1963, Walker was elected to the Virginia House of Delegates representing Norfolk, serving from 1964 to 1971. That year he was elected to the Virginia Senate in a 3-member multimember district representing Norfolk and part of the City of Virginia Beach. Eventually, as a result of redistricting, he would represent the 6th District. He was elected president pro tempore by the Senate in 1988. He served in the Senate, chairing 4 committees, until his defeat by Republican Nick Rerras in 1999.

== Death ==
Walker died on January 15, 2001, in Norfolk, Virginia.

Senate of Virginia
Preceded by	Virginia Senate, District 6; 1984–2000	Succeeded by Nick Rerras
