= 1999 Virginia state elections =

1999 Virginia elections
- November 2, 1999

Virginia's 1999 state elections were held on November 2, 1999. Voters elected all 100 members of the Virginia House of Delegates to two-year terms ending in 2002, and all 40 members of the Virginia Senate to four-year terms ending in 2004. There were also elections for local offices (such as Board of Supervisors, Sheriff, and Clerk of the Circuit Court) in most counties. The elections resulted in the loss of Democratic control of the House of Delegates for the first time ever, and continued the two-year control of the Senate by Republicans.

== Background ==
Governor Jim Gilmore had secured control of the Senate for Republicans for the first time in 114 years in 1997 when he appointed Democratic State Senator Charles Waddell to a position with the Virginia Alcohol Beverage Control Board. He also appointed Delegate David G. Brickley as Director of Virginia Department of Conservation and Recreation, which resulted in a tie in control of the House of Delegates as the one Independent, Lacey Putney, caucused with the Republicans.

According to the University of Virginia's Center for Politics, the 1999 Virginia "legislative election delivered results unlike any of the others that preceded it in the 20th century. Republicans finally gained majority control of the House of Delegates, completing a thirty- year march to power. At the same time, the GOP maintained its narrow 21 to 19-seat control of the Senate of Virginia...."

=== Primaries ===
There were a few primaries in both parties in June, but all incumbents were renominated. The most notable primary was in Richmond's West End, where incumbent Republican Ann G. "Panny" Rhodes was opposed by her Governor and the dominant conservative wing of her party. According to the UVa Center for Politics, "Despite being outspent $440,000 to $236,000 in the state’s most expensive primary race, Rhodes won over 56 percent of the votes. Many Democrats joined moderate Republicans in defeating Gilmore’s choice, businessman Ruble Hord." In all, there were nine primaries, two in the Senate and seven in the House.

== Virginia Senate ==
Prior to these elections, Virginia's Senate consisted of 21 Republicans and 19 Democrats. Republicans and Democrats each defeated one opposing incumbent: the president pro tempore of the Senate, Stanley C. Walker (D) of Norfolk, was defeated by Republican Nick Rerras after 18 years in the Senate. In Fairfax County, 16-year veteran Jane Woods (R) was narrowly beaten by former U.S. Representative Leslie Byrne by just 37 votes out of over 30,000 cast.

== House of Delegates ==
Going into the elections, there were 50 Democrats, 49 Republicans, and 1 Independent, which meant the parties were effectively tied, as the one Independent caucused with the Republicans. Republicans netted three additional seats.

Two senior Democratic incumbents were defeated: Gladys Keating of the Franconia area of Fairfax County and in Virginia Beach, Glenn Croshaw. The Democrats captured one open seat from the Republicans when Benny Keister replaced retiring Republican Delegate Tommy Baker in the 7th District centered on Pulaski County. Republicans also won two open seats, replacing Democrats. George Broman (R) of Culpeper County captured the district of retiring Delegate Butch Davies (D), and on the Virginia Peninsula, Republican Phil Larrabee of Hampton won captured the seat of retiring Democratic Delegate Vince Behm gaining a plurality in a four-person race. As a result, Republicans held 52 seats, Democrats held 47, and there was 1 Independent.
