= Repeal Act (Virginia) =

Virginia State Legislature
- Full name: Repeal Act
- Introduced: January 9, 2019
- Sponsor: Kathy Tran (House of Delegates)

Status: Not passed

The Repeal Act (HB 2491) was a 2019 bill proposed in Virginia by Delegate Kathy Tran that would have repealed some of the state's restrictions on abortion. The bill would have reduced the number of physicians required to approve a third-term abortion (from three to one), and lowered the threshold for that approval to the requirement that there be a medical reason for the abortion, from the previous requirement that the pregnant woman be "substantially and irremediably" harmed by continuing her pregnancy. Similar bills had been introduced in previous years, and one was also introduced by state Senator Jennifer Boysko in the Senate in 2019. The bill was tabled on January 28, 2019 by House Republicans. Testimony about the bill's provisions by Tran and comments about it by Virginia Governor Ralph Northam elicited controversy, with conservatives accusing Virginia Democrats of supporting infanticide.

== Provisions ==
According to the legislative summary of the bill, it:

Eliminates the requirement that an abortion in the second trimester of pregnancy and prior to the third trimester be performed in a hospital. The bill eliminates all the procedures and processes, including the performance of an ultrasound, required to effect a woman's informed written consent to the performance of an abortion; however, the bill does not change the requirement that a woman's informed written consent be first obtained. The bill eliminates the requirement that two other physicians certify that a third-trimester abortion is necessary to prevent the woman's death or impairment of her mental or physical health, as well as the need to find that any such impairment to the woman's health would be substantial and irremediable. The bill also removes language classifying facilities that perform five or more first-trimester abortions per month as hospitals for the purpose of complying with regulations establishing minimum standards for hospitals.

== Sponsors ==
In addition to Tran, the House bill was co-sponsored by Delegates Hala Ayala, Jennifer Carroll Foy, Lee Carter, Wendy Gooditis, Elizabeth Guzman, Patrick Hope, Jay Jones, Kaye Kory, Paul Krizek, Mark Levine, Alfonso H. Lopez, Delores McQuinn, Sam Rasoul, David A. Reid, Debra Rodman, Marcus Simon, Cheryl Turpin, Roslyn Tyler, and Schuyler VanValkenburg. State Senators Jennifer Boysko and Jennifer McClellan signed on as the bill's patrons in the Senate.

== Tran's testimony ==
The House bill was referred to a subcommittee of the House Committee for Courts of Justice. Tran testified about her bill to the subcommittee on January 28, 2019. Delegate Todd Gilbert, chairman of the subcommittee, asked Tran: "How late in the third trimester could a physician perform an abortion if he indicated it would impair the mental health of the woman?" Tran replied: "Or physical health." Gilbert then said: "Okay. I'm talking about the mental health." Tran replied: "So, I mean, through the third trimester. The third trimester goes all the way up to 40 weeks." Gilbert then asked: "Okay, but to the end of the third trimester?" Tran replied: "Yep. I don't think we have a limit in the bill." Pressing further, Gilbert asked Tran if a woman who has physical signs she is about to give birth could request an abortion if a physician said it could impair her mental health. He clarified his question by saying: "Where it's obvious that a woman is about to give birth. She has physical signs that she is about to give birth. Would that still be a point at which she could request an abortion if she was so-certified? She's dilating." Tran replied: "Mr. Chairman, that would be a decision that the doctor, the physician, and the woman would make at that point." Gilbert said: "I understand that. I'm asking if your bill allows that." Tran replied: "My bill would allow that, yes."

The bill was tabled (or voted down) in the subcommittee on January 28, 2019, by a 5–3 vote, with all Republicans voting to table it and all Democrats voting not to table it. The related Senate bill had been considered without extensive questioning and voted down in a Senate committee on an 8–7 party line vote on January 17, 2019.

== Response ==
Video of Tran's exchange with Gilbert was posted to social media by Virginia Republicans and went viral, receiving millions of views on Twitter. It sparked outrage, especially in the wake of New York's passage of the Reproductive Health Act, and inflamed political divisions. Speaker of the House Kirk Cox took to the House floor to denounce the bill in a dramatic speech, something speakers rarely do, and said he worried that Virginia would adopt more liberal abortion laws such as New York's. Several news publications noted that Virginia law already allows third-trimester abortions up to the point of dilating, although only when three physicians agree that the mother's physical or mental health would be "substantially and irremediably" harmed by continued pregnancy. (Note: If continued pregnancy is found to pose an imminent danger to a woman's life, then Virginia law allows an abortion during the third-trimester to be certified by a single physician.) The Repeal Act, if passed, would have allowed such an abortion to occur if a single physician determines that continued pregnancy poses any mental or physical health risk to the mother. Tran deleted her Twitter account soon after the criticism began, in response to threats against herself and her family.

On January 30, 2019, Virginia Governor Ralph Northam was asked on WTOP-FM's "Ask the Governor" program about the bill and a situation in which a woman were to desire an abortion as she's going into labor. Northam responded: "When we talk about third-trimester abortions ... it's done in cases where there may be severe deformities, there may be a fetus that's non-viable. So, in this particular example, if a mother is in labor, I can tell you exactly what would happen. The infant would be delivered. The infant would be kept comfortable. The infant would be resuscitated if that's what the mother and the family desired, and then a discussion would ensue between the physicians and the mother", leaving open what would happen next. According to The Washington Post, Northam's office later clarified that Northam was "talking about prognosis and medical treatment, not ending the life of a delivered baby", but Northam's comments were interpreted by many Republicans as supporting infanticide. Elected officials and pundits from around the country weighed in, and "Twitter erupted", according to The Washington Post. United States Senator Marco Rubio tweeted he "never thought I would see the day America had government officials who openly support legal infanticide", and U.S. Senator Ben Sasse said: "I don't care what party you're from — if you can't say that it's wrong to leave babies to die after birth, get the hell out of public office." Sasse said he would seek to fast-track the Born-Alive Abortion Survivors Protection Act in the Senate, in response to the controversy. President Donald Trump weighed in, saying he was "surprised that Northam did that, I've met him a number of times", and saying of Tran's comments: "I thought it was terrible. Do you remember when I said Hillary Clinton was willing to rip the baby out of the womb? That's what it is, that's what they're doing, it's terrible." Trump revisited the topic in his 2019 State of the Union Address, when he inaccurately claimed that Northam would "execute a baby after birth".

A spokeswoman for Northam later issued a statement, saying: "No woman seeks a third trimester abortion, except in the case of tragic or difficult circumstances, such as a non-viable pregnancy or in the event of severe fetal abnormalities, and the governor's comments were limited to the actions physicians would take in the event that a woman in those circumstances went into labor." Democratic House Minority Leader Eileen Filler-Corn accused Republicans of an "orchestrated ambush" against Tran, and the Democratic Party of Virginia said Republicans sought to "deliberately misrepresent" the bill and were engaging in "fear-mongering" that represented "Trump-style national politics, rather than the Virginia way". Gilbert responded by saying: "What my Democratic colleagues are most concerned about is what this moment actually revealed. It was a moment of unbridled honesty about their agenda and their legislation, and what it actually does."

Delegate Dawn Adams, who had co-sponsored the bill, sent an e-mail to her constituents apologizing for co-sponsoring the bill, saying she didn't fully understand the bill and believed it would only repeal "onerous" restrictions on abortion enacted in 2012. Adams said that while the bill did repeal those restrictions, she "did not exercise due diligence", adding, "it sought to do much more", Adams said. "Had I researched each line of removed language, I would have seen that, and known that there was more research to be done. None of this changes that I believe women must have safe, legal options for abortion; but I also would have seen the utility of language that provides guidelines for how to ensure this."

Conservatives predicted that efforts by Democrats to expand abortion would become a potent issue in the 2020 elections and play in to concerns that the Democratic Party is moving too far to the left. National Review columnist John McCormack said most Democratic candidates for president in 2020 had already shown support for the Repeal Act through their sponsorship of the Women's Health Protection Act, a federal law proposed in Congress that would override state restrictions on third-trimester abortions.

== See also ==
- Reproductive Health Act
