= Reproductive Health Act =

New York State Legislature
- Full name: Reproductive Health Act
- Acronym: RHA
- Introduced: January 9, 2019
- Assembly voted: January 22, 2019 (92-47)
- Senate voted: January 22, 2019 (38-24)
- Signed into law: January 22, 2019
- Sponsor(s): Deborah J. Glick (Assembly), Liz Krueger (Senate)
- Governor: Andrew Cuomo

Status: Current legislation

The Reproductive Health Act is a New York law enacted on January 22, 2019 that protects reproductive rights, decriminalized abortion, and eliminated several restrictions on voluntary abortions in the state. The RHA repealed §4164 of the state Public Health Law. The law has received national media attention.

== Overview ==
Prior to the passage of the Reproductive Health Act (RHA), New York law banned abortions after 24 weeks of pregnancy, except when necessary to save the life of a pregnant woman. In addition, New York law recognized licensed physicians as the only medical providers able to perform abortions. Abortion was also included as part of the penal law under homicide, and could be charged as a criminal offense prior to the RHA.

The Reproductive Health Act and similar bills were proposed in the New York State Legislature beginning in 2007, but such legislation was blocked by Senate Republicans for years. After Senate Democrats gained a majority in the State Senate in the 2018 elections, they vowed to make the passage of the Reproductive Health Act a priority.

== Passage ==
The Reproductive Health Act passed the New York State Senate by a vote of 38–24 on January 22, 2019, the 46th anniversary of the United States Supreme Court's Roe v. Wade ruling. The state Assembly passed the Reproductive Health Act, 92–47, on the same day. It was signed into law by Governor Andrew Cuomo that evening. Cuomo ordered One World Trade Center and other landmarks to be lit in pink to celebrate the bill's passage. The celebratory lighting of One World Trade Center was criticized by conservative religious figures and politicians, including Vice President Mike Pence. It was decried by one New York Daily News columnist as an act of trolling and politicizing the memorial to the victims of the September 11 attacks, to celebrate the passage of a divisive law.

Reproductive Health Act – Vote in the Assembly (January 22, 2019)
Party	Votes for	Votes against	Not voting/Not present
Democratic (105)	94	7: Michael G. Miller; William Colton; Simcha Eichenstein; Michael Cusick; Al Taylor; Marcos Crespo; Marianne Buttenschon	5: Brian Barnwell; David F. Gantt; Joseph R. Lentol; Barbara Lifton; Robin Schimminger
Republican (43)	–	42	1: Gary Finch
Independence (1)	1: Fred Thiele	–	–
Total (150)	95	49	6

Reproductive Health Act – Vote in the Senate (January 22, 2019)
Party	Votes for	Votes against	Not voting/Not present
Democratic (40)	38	2: Joseph Addabbo, Jr.; Simcha Felder	–
Republican (23)	–	22	1: John J. Flanagan
Total (63)	38	24	1

== Impact ==
The RHA legalizes all abortions on demand up to 24 weeks of gestation. Beyond 24 weeks gestation, abortion is legal if the woman's life or health are at risk, or if the fetus is not viable. Per the norm to not define medical terms in the law, the terms "health", "at risk", and "viable" were not defined in the RHA. It was determined that it is up to the discretion of a woman's medical provider to determine if her health is at risk, and it is up to medical providers to determine if a fetus is viable, based on specific medical criteria.

The RHA permits advanced practice clinicians (APCs), including physician assistants, nurse practitioners, and licensed midwives, to lawfully provide abortion services if they have the appropriate qualifications, and if this falls within their scope of practice. Before the passage of the RHA, many state medical boards had already permitted APCs to provide abortions, given that studies have shown that APCs who are trained to provide abortion services provide safe abortions, comparable to those provided by physicians. APCs were providing abortions prior to the passage of the RHA in New York, and the passage of the RHA allowed this to be reflected in the law. This has been particularly important in making abortion more accessible by increasing the number of medical practitioners who can provide safe abortions.

Supporters argued the bill was needed to codify abortion rights in the state, in the event that Roe v. Wade is overturned and the issue of abortion legality returns to the states (which later did occur in 2022 following the Supreme Court decision in Dobbs v. Jackson Women's Health Organization.) Supporters also said the bill was needed to take abortion out of the state criminal code, and place it in public health law.

The RHA was criticized because it removed abortion from the criminal code, with potential consequences for crimes against pregnant women. State Representative Nicole Malliotakis said that removing abortion from the criminal code means that if a fetus dies as the result of an assault on a woman, there would be no prosecution. Two legislators who sponsored the act wrote an op-ed, arguing that violence resulting in a loss of pregnancy could still be prosecuted as first-degree assault. In February 2019, the Queens district attorney's office dropped a charge of second-degree murder against a man who murdered his pregnant girlfriend, saying their ability to press the charge was repealed by the Reproductive Health Act. However, the man was still charged with murder, a superseding offense, and as such, the dropped charge would not affect sentencing.

== See also ==
- Repeal Act (Virginia)
