= Nick Rerras =

American politician (born 1957)

Member of the Virginia Senate from the 6th district
- In office January 12, 2000 – January 9, 2008
- Preceded by: Stanley Walker
- Succeeded by: Ralph Northam

Personal details
- Born: Dimitrios Nick Rerras; February 19, 1957 (age 69) Norfolk, Virginia, U.S.
- Party: Republican
- Spouse: Gayle
- Children: Nicholas; Helena; Costas; Robert
- Education: Philadelphia Biblical University
- Occupation: Marketer
- Website: www.nickrerras.com

Dimitrios Nick Rerras (born February 19, 1957) is an American politician from the Commonwealth of Virginia. A Republican, he served in the Senate of Virginia from 2000 to 2008 representing the 6th District. At various times during his term of office, it included parts of Norfolk, Virginia Beach, the Eastern Shore of Virginia, and Mathews County.

== Early life and family ==
Rerras was born on February 19, 1957, in Norfolk, the son of Greek immigrants. He graduated from Granby High School in Norfolk. His wife is Gayle and they have four children and reside in Norfolk. He has an associate degree in Electronics Technology from Tidewater Community College and graduated with a bachelor's degree from Philadelphia Biblical University.

== Military service ==
Nick served in the United States Army in the 9th Infantry Division and was twice selected as the Soldier of the Quarter.

== Political career ==
In 1995, Rerras challenged longtime Senator Stanley C. Walker, the President pro tempore of the Senate, in the 6th District, based in Norfolk and Virginia Beach. Walker won reelection 55%-45%. However, Republicans gained a 20–20 tie in the Senate statewide, and Walker's position was weakened by a power-sharing agreement.

Rerras ran again in 1999, this time upsetting Walker 59%-41%. In 2001, Rerras' district was expanded to include the Eastern Shore counties of Accomack and Northampton and Mathews County on the Middle Peninsula.

In 2003, Rerras was challenged by Norfolk trial lawyer Andrew A. Protogyrou. Rerras won reelection handily, 62%-38%.

In 2007, Ralph Northam, an Eastern Shore native who worked as a pediatric neurologist in Norfolk, unseated Rerras, 54%-46%.

Senate of Virginia
Preceded by Stanley C. Walker	Virginia Senate, District 6; 2000 - 2008	Succeeded by Ralph Northam
