= Virginia Department of Forensic Science =

- Virginia Department of Forensic Science

Agency overview
- Formed: 1972
- Jurisdiction: Virginia
- Headquarters: 700 North Fifth Street, Richmond, Virginia 23219; 37.54712°N 77.43374°W
- Employees: 326
- Annual budget: $47,861,280 USD
- Agency executive: Linda Jackson, Department Director
- Parent agency: Virginia Secretary of Public Safety
- Website: dfs.virginia.gov

The Virginia Department of Forensic Science (DFS) is a state agency of the Commonwealth of Virginia. Its purpose is to provide laboratory services in criminal matters in Virginia and to increase understanding of forensic science in general.

In 1972, DFS was first formed as a bureau attached to the Division of Consolidated Laboratory Services (DCLS). This bureau became a division in 1990, and a department in 2005. The current director, Linda Jackson, has been director of DFS since February 2013. DFS reports to the Governor's Secretary of Public Safety.
