= List of Washington College alumni =

Alumni of private liberal arts college in Chestertown, Maryland

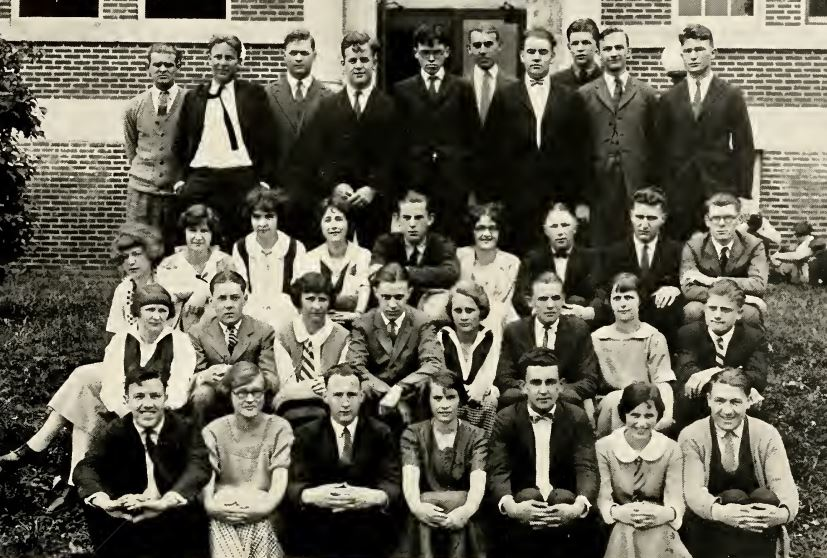
The class of 1927 sitting in front of William Smith Hall

Washington College is a private liberal arts college in Chestertown, Maryland, which is on the Eastern Shore of Maryland. The college was founded in 1782 by William Smith, but is the successor institution to the earlier Kent County Free School, which was founded in 1732. Modern college classes – freshman, sophomore, junior, and senior – were introduced in the 1870s by President William Rivers. At the same time, a class called sub-freshmen was created for students who did not meet the requirements to be freshmen. The college continued to admit sub-freshmen to the preparatory department until 1924.

Washington College experienced major fires in 1827 and 1916 that destroyed most of the school's records. Because of this, it is impossible to know how many students graduated before 1916, nor in which years people graduated. However, it is known that 218 students graduated between 1845 and 1903, and, that in 1910, the college had 113 students enrolled. The college has continued to grow. In 1952, the college more than doubled its enrollment, to 350 students. Between the 1950s and 1970s, the college doubled its enrollment again, to 800 students in 1972. Since the 1970s, the college has close to doubled the 1972 enrollment, with 1,480 students enrolled in 2019.

Alumni of Washington College includes two governors of Maryland, a governor of Delaware, four United States senators, seven members of the United States House of Representatives, and nine state senators. Nine alumni played at least one game in Major League Baseball, including Jake Flowers, who was on two World Series-winning teams. John Emory, the namesake of Emory University and Emory and Henry College, graduated from Washington College. Several alumni have been successful writers, including James M. Cain. Mary Adele France, who was the first president of St. Mary's College of Maryland, and Robert K. Crane, who discovered sodium-glucose cotransport, both found success in academia. H. Lawrence Culp Jr. is the CEO of Danaher Corporation and the CEO of General Electric.

- A "?" indicates that the year of graduation is unknown.
- "A "‡" indicates the final year that a non-graduating alumnus attended the college.
- An "M" indicates a master's alumnus.

== Academics ==
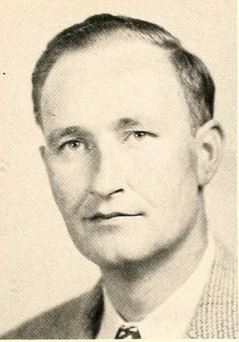
Joseph McLain

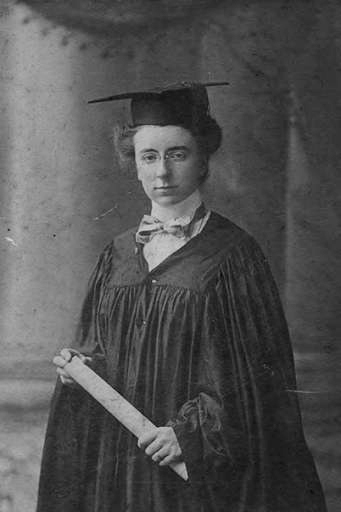
Mary Adele France

Washington College alumni who are notable for their contributions to higher education
Name	Class year (Note: The year that an alumnus graduated from or left Washington College.)	Notability	Ref(s)
Mary Adele France	1900	First president of St Mary's College of Maryland	
Marcia A. Invernizzi	1972	Professor at the University of Virginia School of Education and Human Development	
Stephan Lewandowsky	1980	Professor of Psychology at the University of Bristol	
Joseph McLain	1937	Pyrotechnic chemist and president of Washington College. He was the first alumnus to hold the position of president at the college.	
Ralph Snyderman	1961	Chancellor for health affairs and dean of the School of Medicine at Duke University	

== Arts and entertainment ==
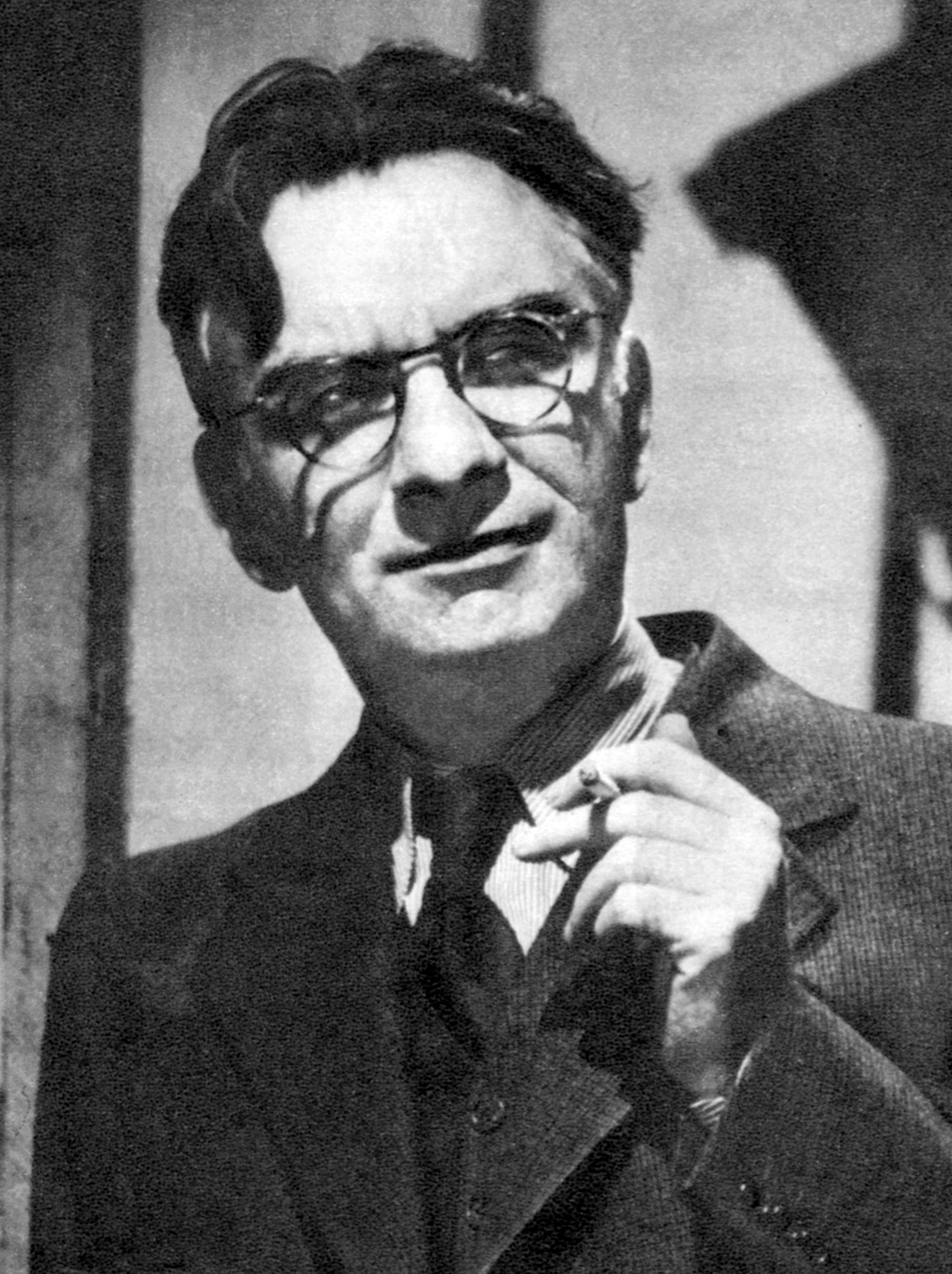
James M. Cain

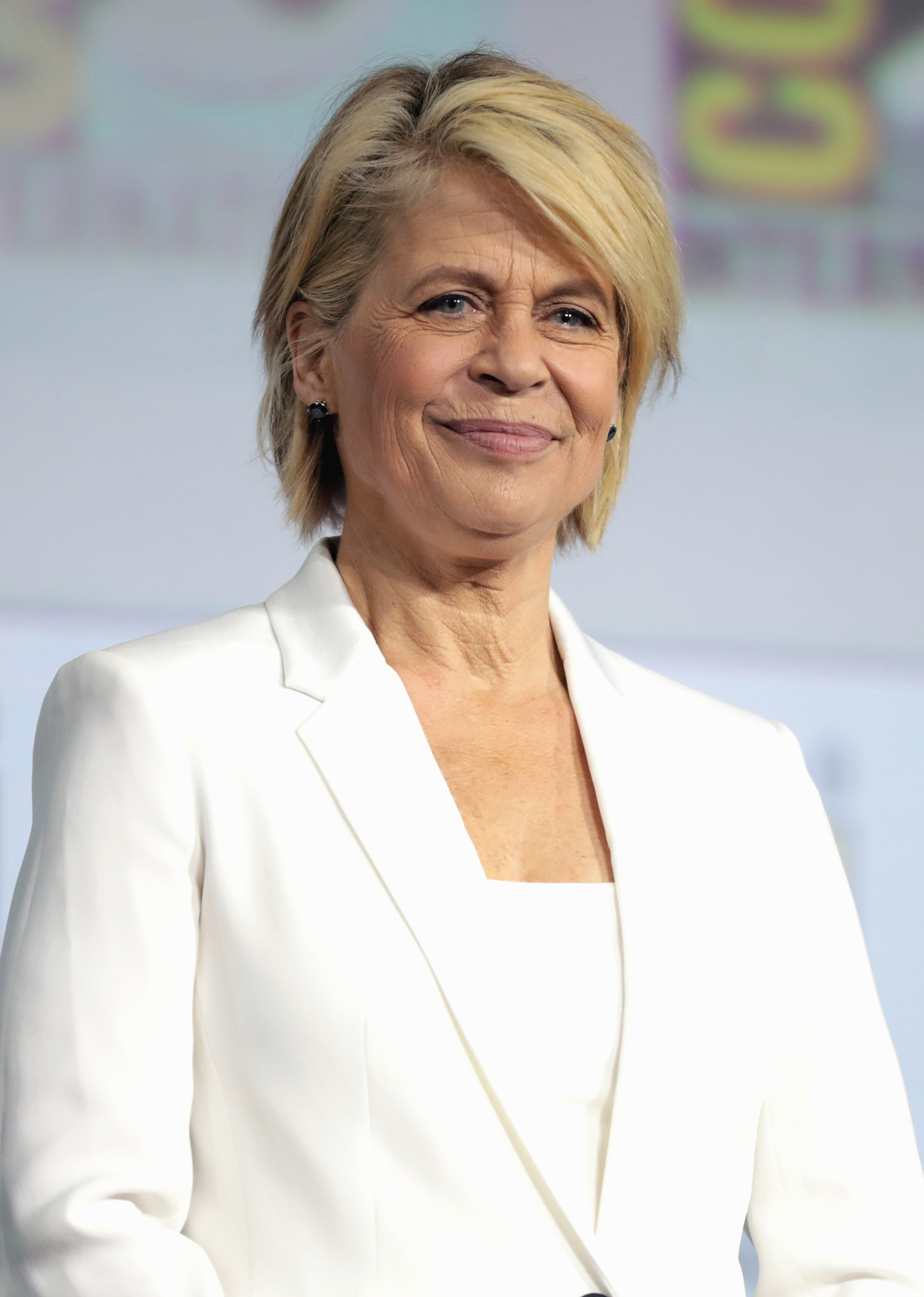
Linda Hamilton

Washington College alumni who are notable for their contributions to the arts or as entertainers
Name	Class year	Notability	Ref(s)
Deborah Anzinger	2001	Visual artist	
Gilbert V. Byron	1923	Writer of The Lord's Oysters, Done Crabbin', and These Chesapeake Men. Known as "The Chesapeake Thoreau."	
James M. Cain	1910	Writer of The Postman Always Rings Twice, Double Indemnity and Mildred Pierce	
Frank Giampietro	2002 M	Poet	
Geoffrey Girard	1990	Writer	
Linda Hamilton	1978‡	Actress who portrayed Sarah Connor in The Terminator	
Raph Koster	1992	Game designer, Ultima Online and Star Wars Galaxies, author of A Theory of Fun for Game Design	
Erin Murphy	1990	Poet	
Laura San Giacomo	1983‡	Actress who portrayed Cynthia Patrice Bishop in Sex, Lies, and Videotape and Maya Gallo in Just Shoot Me!	

== Athletics ==
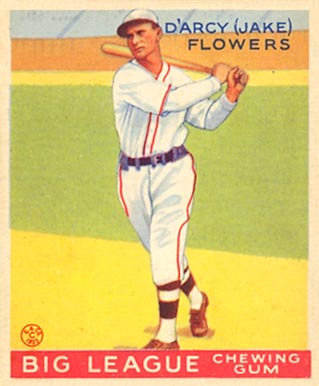
D'Arcy "Jake" Flowers

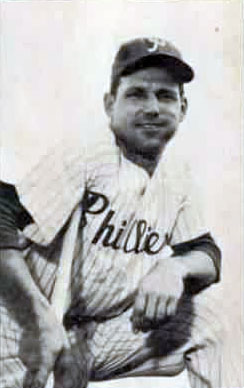
Bill Nicholson

Washington College alumni who are notable for their contributions to sports or athletics
Name	Class year	Notability	Ref(s)
Al Burris	1894	Pitcher for the Philadelphia Phillies	
Dave Leonhard	1960‡	Pitcher for the Baltimore Orioles	
D'Arcy "Jake" Flowers	? (Note: Flowers's first season in Major League Baseball was 1923.)	Second baseman and shortstop for the St. Louis Cardinals, Brooklyn Dodgers and Cincinnati Reds	
John Howard	1956	Head coach of Maryland Terrapins men's lacrosse and Professor of English	
Bill Nicholson	1936	Right fielder for the Philadelphia Athletics, Chicago Cubs and Philadelphia Phillies	
Homer Smoot	1897 (Note: The Society for American Baseball Research has found evidence that Smoot played for Washington College as late as 1899.)	Center fielder for the St. Louis Cardinals and Cincinnati Reds	
John "Happy" Townsend	? (Note: Townsend's first season in Major League Baseball was 1901.)	Pitcher for the Philadelphia Phillies, Washington Senators, and Cleveland Naps	
Frederick "Doc" Wallace	? (Note: Wallace's first season in Major League Baseball was 1919.)	Shortstop for the Philadelphia Phillies	
Ralph "Pepe" Young	? (Note: Young's first season in Major League Baseball was 1913.)	Second baseman for the New York Yankees, Detroit Tigers, and Philadelphia Athletics	
Dave Zearfoss	? (Note: Zearfoss's first season in Major League Baseball was 1896.)	Catcher for the New York Giants and St. Louis Cardinals	

== Law and government ==
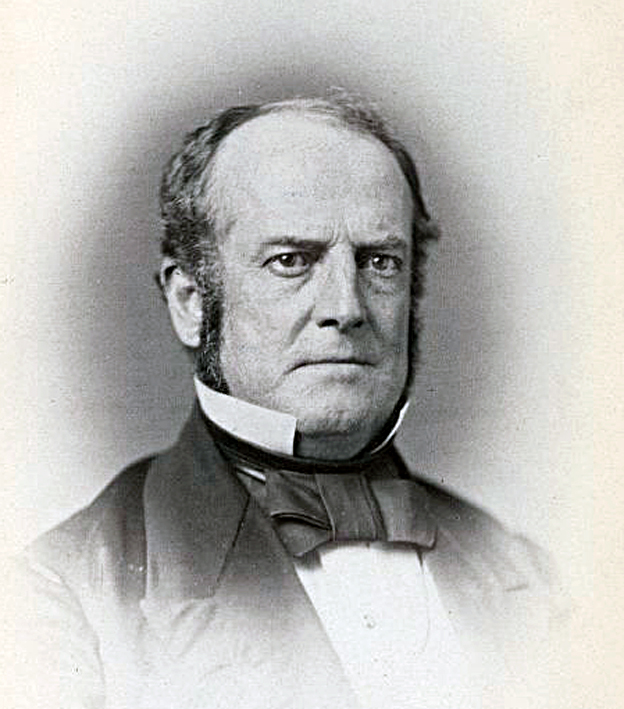
James Barroll Ricaud

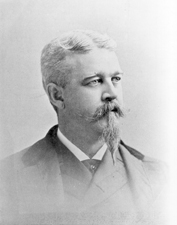
Charles Hopper Gibson

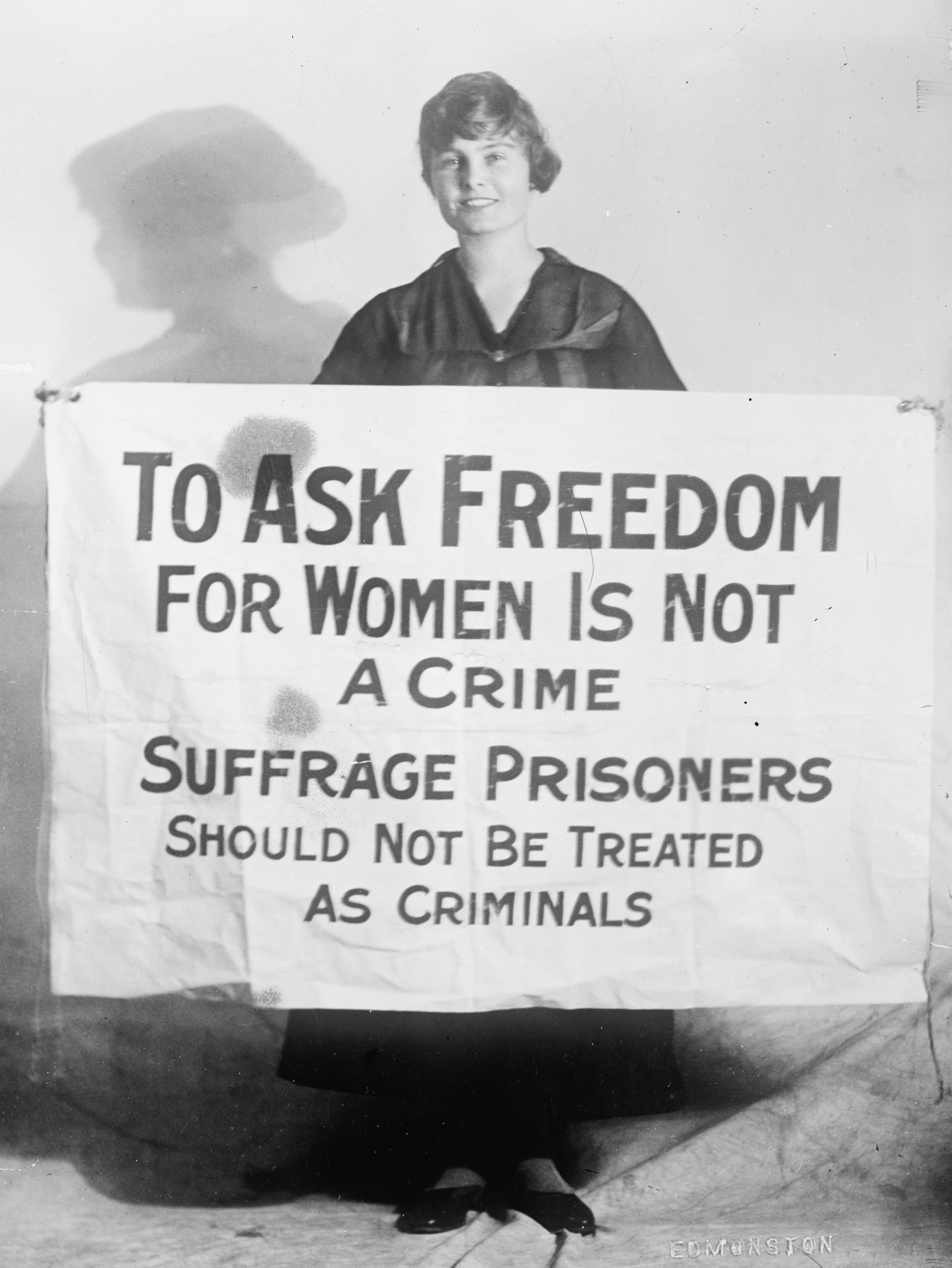
Lucy Gwynne Branham

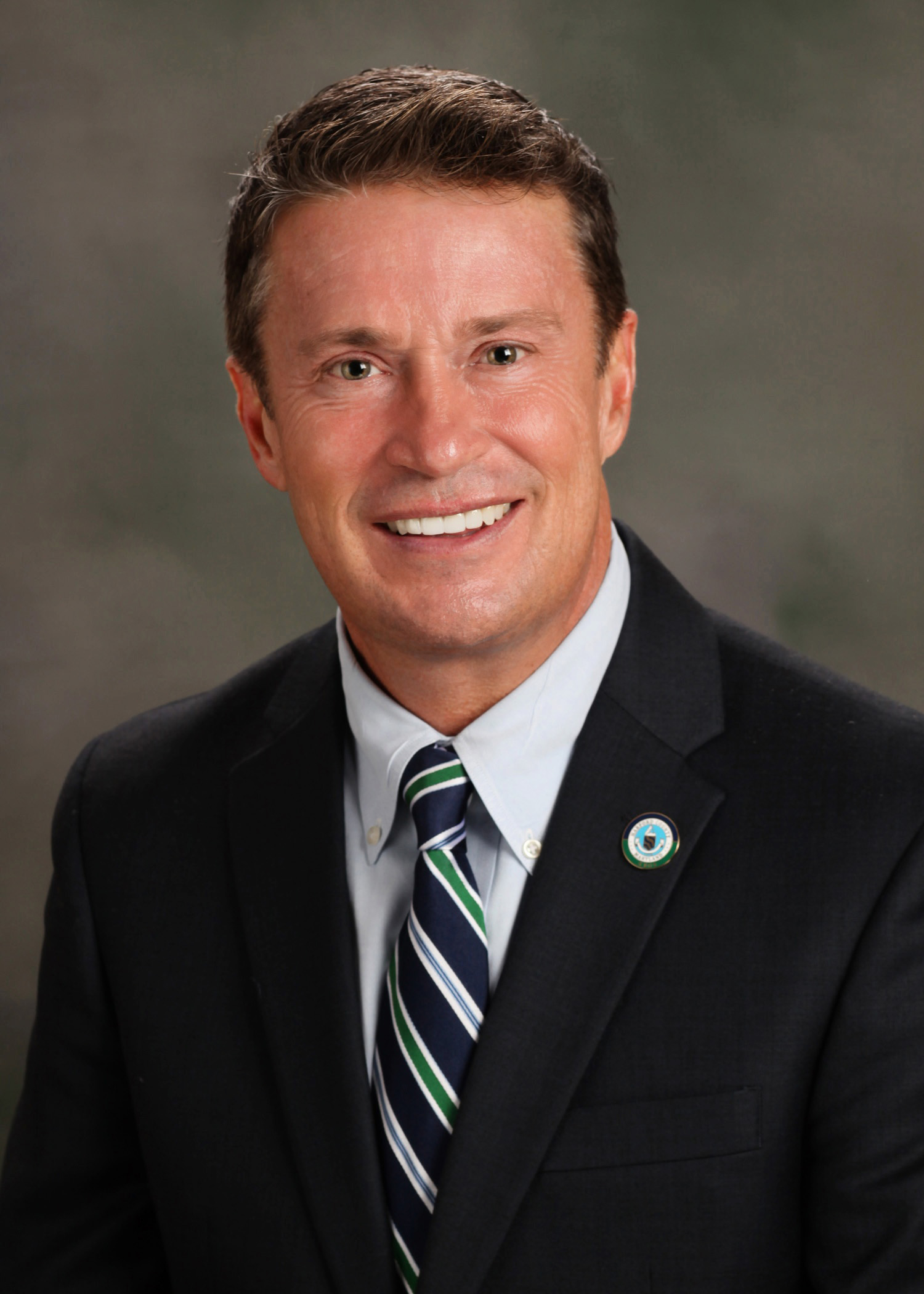
Barry Glassman

Washington College alumni who are notable for their contributions to law or politics
Name	Class year	Notability	Ref(s)
Walter M. Baker	1960	Maryland state senator (1979–2003)	
Rose Mary Hatem Bonsack	1955	Member of the Maryland House of Delegates (1991–1999)	
Lucy Gwynne Branham	? (Note: Branham earned her masters from Johns Hopkins University in 1914.)	Suffragette and Carnegie Medal awardee	
Robert Franklin Brattan	1864	President of the Maryland Senate and U.S. representative for Maryland's 1st congressional district (1893–1894)	
Ezekiel F. Chambers	1805	United States senator (1826–1834)	
John W. Crisfield	? (Note: Crisfield was admitted to the bar in 1830.)	U.S. representative for Maryland's 6th congressional district (1847–1849) and Maryland's 1st congressional district (1861–1864)	
Jerry Davis	1995	Member of the Houston City Council (2012–2020)	
Robert P. Dean	1931	Maryland state senator (1955–1971)	
Joseph M. Getty	1974	Maryland state senator (2011–2015) and judge on the Maryland Court of Appeals	
Charles Hopper Gibson	? (Note: Gibson was admitted to the bar in 1864.)	U.S. representative for Maryland's 1st congressional district (1885–1891) and United States senator for Maryland (1891–1897)	
Barry Glassman	1984	Maryland state senator (2011–2015) and Harford County county executive	
Thomas Alan Goldsborough	1899	U.S. representative for Maryland's 1st congressional district (1921–1939) and United States district judge of the United States District Court for the District of Columbia	
Louis L. Goldstein	1935	Maryland state senator (1947–1958) and comptroller of Maryland (1959–1998)	
Margaret Jefferson Jackson	1929	Maryland state senator (1953–1955)	
Melat Kiros	2018	Democratic nominee for Colorado's 1st congressional district (2026).	
Barbara Osborn Kreamer	1970	Member of the Maryland House of Delegates (1983–1991)	
Joseph J. Longobardi	1952	Judge for the U.S. District Court for the District of Delaware	
Thomas Hunter Lowe	1952	Speaker of the Maryland House of Delegates and judge on the Maryland Court of Special Appeals	
John Overington	1962	Speaker pro tempore of the West Virginia House of Delegates	
James Alfred Pearce	?‡ (Note: Pearce transferred from Washington College to Princeton University c. 1859.)	Judge on the Maryland Court of Appeals	
Isaac Freeman Rasin	? (Note: Rasin was elected to the Baltimore City Democratic executive committee in 1864. Brugger (1988, p. 385) does not mention how long the gap was between his education and political career.)	Baltimore political boss	
James Barroll Ricaud	1828	U.S. representative for Maryland's 2nd congressional district (1855–1859)	
Dudley Roe	1903	Maryland state senator (1923–1935; 1939–1943) and U.S. representative for Maryland's 1st congressional district (1945–1947)	
Dean Skelos	1970	New York state senator (1985–2015) and felon	
Thomas Veazey	1795	24th governor of Maryland	
George Vickers	? (Note: Vickers was admitted to the bar in 1832. Lanman (1868, p. 395) mentions there was a substantial gap between Vickers's formal education and his bar membership.)	United States senator for Maryland (1868–1873)	
William T. Watson	? (Note: Watson was elected to the Delaware House of Representatives in 1884. Addresses Delivered at the Formal Presentation of the Portraits of the Governors of Delaware to the State, Thursday, May 26th, 1898 (1898, p. 41) does not mention the size of the gap between his education and his election.)	Speaker of the Delaware Senate and 49th governor of Delaware	
Joseph A. Wickes	?‡ (Note: Wickes transferred from Washington College to Princeton University where he graduated in 1845.)	Member of the Maryland House of Delegates (1856) and judge on the Maryland Second Circuit	
Robert Wright	? (Note: Wright was admitted to the bar in 1773. His Senate biography and The National Cyclopaedia of American Biography (1899, p. 297) mention that he graduated from Washington College before he was admitted to the bar, but the school was not chartered until 1782 (Dumschott 1980, p. 10). Wright probably attended the predecessor institution, the Kent County Free School.)	United States senator for Maryland (1801–1806), 12th governor of Maryland, and U.S. representative for Maryland's 7th congressional district (1810–1817; 1821–1823)	

== Other ==
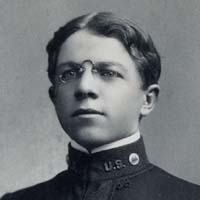
Gilbert T. Rude

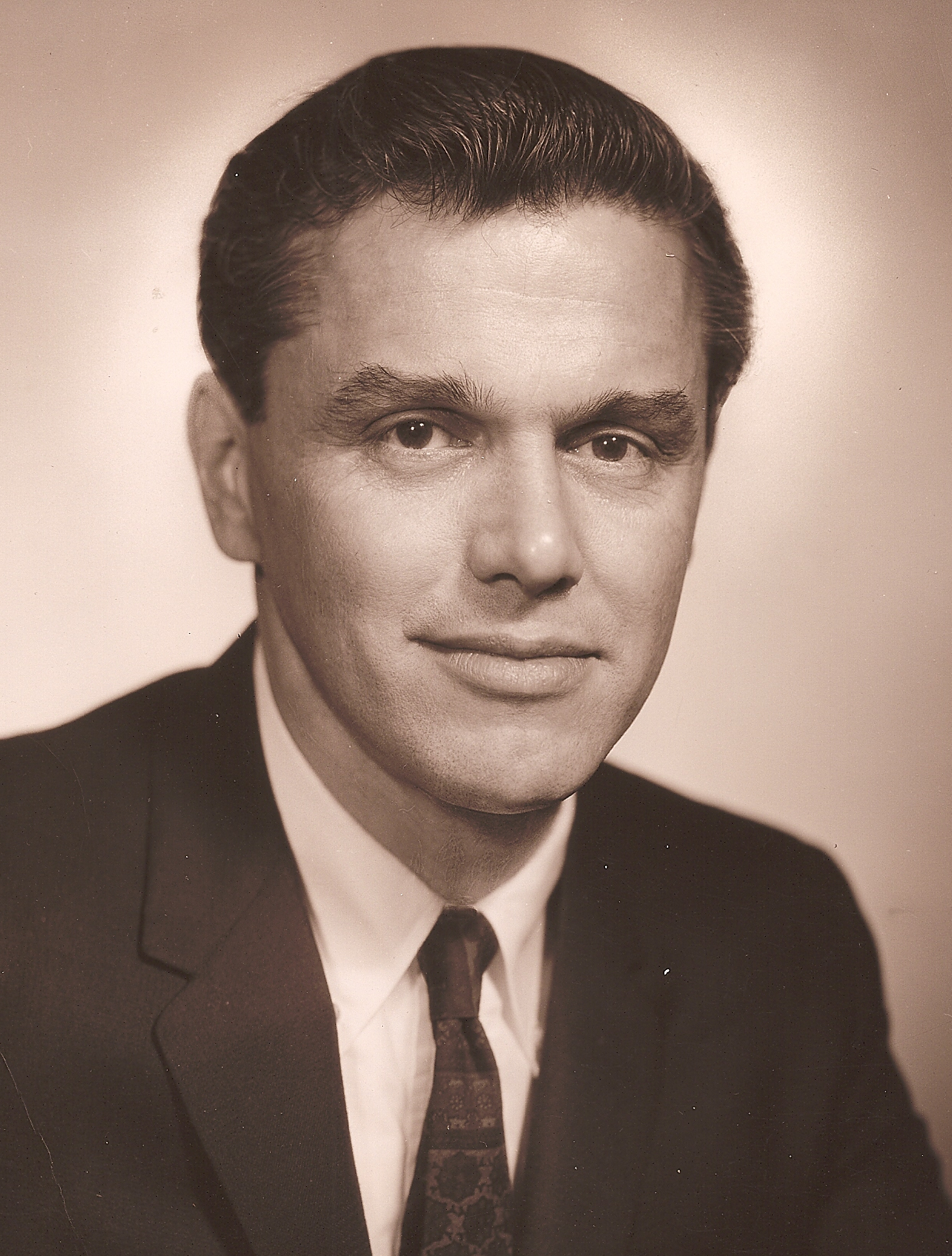
Robert K. Crane

Washington College alumni who are notable for their contributions to other fields
Name	Class year	Notability	Ref(s)
James A. Adkins	1991 M	28th adjutant general of Maryland	
William O. Baker	1935	President of Bell Labs (1973–1979)	
Jeannie Baliles	1962	First Lady of Virginia and founder of Virginia Literacy Foundation	
Robert K. Crane	1942	Biochemist who discovered sodium-glucose cotransport	
H. Lawrence Culp Jr.	1985	CEO of GE Aerospace and CEO of Danaher Corporation	
Edward F. C. Davis	1866	President of the American Society of Mechanical Engineers	
John Emory	1805	Bishop of the Methodist Episcopal Church	
Kenneth M. Merz Jr.	1981	Biochemist and editor-in-chief of the Journal of Chemical Information and Modeling	
Jane E. Mitchell	1976 M	Nurse and civil rights activist	
Gilbert T. Rude	? (Note: Rude received his commission in 1903.)	United States Coast and Geodetic Survey and United States Navy captain	
William Murray Stone	1799	Bishop of the Episcopal Diocese of Maryland	
Joseph Wilson Sutton	1900; 1904 M	Episcopal priest	
Benjamin H. Vandervoort	1938	US Army colonel who was twice awarded the Distinguished Service Cross	
William J. Wallace	1917	US Marine Corps lieutenant general	
Harris Whitbeck	1987	Correspondent for CNN International	
William Holland Wilmer	1802	Episcopal Priest and eleventh President of the College of William and Mary	
