= J. Williams =

J. Williams may refer to:

- J. Williams (cinematographer) (1948–2005), producer, director and cinematographer of Malayalam-language films
- J. Williams (singer) (born 1986), New Zealand singer and dancer
- J. J. Williams Jr. (1905–1968), American lawyer, banker, and politician
- J. T. Williams (fl. 1928–1930), football coach at Kentucky State University, United States
- Joseph Williams (musician) (born 1960), American singer and songwriter

== See also ==
- List of people with surname Williams § J
- J. J. Williams (disambiguation)
