= First ladies and gentlemen of Virginia =

Spouses of governors of the U.S. state of Virginia

First Gentleman of Virginia
- Seal of the Commonwealth of Virginia
- Current; Adam Spanberger since January 17, 2026
- Residence: Executive Mansion
- Inaugural holder: Dorothea Dandridge Henry (as first lady); Adam Spanberger (as first gentleman)
- Formation: July 5, 1776; 250 years ago

The first lady or first gentleman of Virginia is an honorary title held by the spouse of the governor of Virginia. The current first gentleman is Adam Spanberger, who became the first first gentleman of Virginia when his wife Abigail Spanberger became governor on January 17, 2026.

== Role ==
The position of the first lady or first gentlemen is not an elected one, carries no official duties, and receives no salary. However, the role holds a highly visible position in state government. Since 1813, it has included serving as the host of the Executive Mansion. The first lady or first gentleman organizes and attends official ceremonies and functions of state either along with, or in place of, the governor. It is common for the governor's spouse to select specific, non-political, causes to promote.

== List ==
	Picture	Name	Took office	Left office	Spouse of	Notes
1		Dorothea Dandridge Henry	1777	1779	Patrick Henry	1st and 6th first lady of Virginia
2		Martha Jefferson	1779	1781	Thomas Jefferson	Died at age 33, twenty years before husband's election as U.S. president
3		Anne Christian Fleming	1781	1781	William Fleming	
4		Lucy Grymes Nelson	1781	1781	Thomas Nelson Jr.	
5		Elizabeth Bassett Harrison	1781	1784	Benjamin Harrison V	
6		Dorothea Dandridge Henry	1784	1786	Patrick Henry	
7		Elizabeth Nichols Randolph	1786	1788	Edmund Randolph	
8		Martha Cocke Randolph	1788	1791	Beverley Randolph	
9		Anne Hill Carter Lee	1793	1794	Henry Lee III	Mother of general-in-chief of the Confederate States of America, Robert E. Lee
10		Mary Ritchie Hopper Brooke	1794	1796	Robert Brooke	
11		Jean Moncure Wood	1796	1799	James Wood	
12		Elizabeth Monroe	1799	1802	James Monroe	12th and 15th first lady of Virginia, served as the first lady of the United States (1817–1825)
13		Margaret Lowther Page	1802	1805	John Page	
14		Agnes Sarah Bell Cabell	1805	1808	William H. Cabell	
		None	1808	1811	John Tyler Sr.	Tyler was a widower
15		Elizabeth Monroe	1811	1811	James Monroe	
16		Jane Reade Smith	1811	1811	George William Smith	
17		Lucy Johnson Barbour	1812	1814	James Barbour	
18		Margaret Smith Nicholas	1814	1816	Wilson Cary Nicholas	
19		Ann Barraud Taylor Preston	1816	1819	James Patton Preston	
20		Martha Jefferson Randolph	1819	1822	Thomas Mann Randolph Jr.	Daughter of 3rd U.S. President Thomas Jefferson, served as the acting first lady of the United States for her father (1801–1809)
21		Susanna Lawson Pleasants	1822	1825	James Pleasants	
22		Letitia Christian Tyler	1825	1827	John Tyler	Served as the second lady (1841) and first lady of the United States (1841–1842)
23		Frances Ann Gwynn Giles	1827	1830	William Branch Giles	
24		Letitia Preston Floyd	1830	1834	John Floyd	
25		Anne Stratton Tazewell	1834	1836	Littleton Waller Tazewell	
26		Maria Hamilton Campbell	1837	1840	David Campbell	
27		Anne Baker Gilmer	1840	1841	Thomas Walker Gilmer	
28		Susanna Smith Preston McDowell	1843	1846	James McDowell	
29		Elizabeth Bell Smith	1846	1849	William Smith	
30		Sally Buchanan Preston Floyd	1849	1852	John B. Floyd	
31		Sarah Johnson	1852	1855	Joseph Johnson	
32		Mary Elizabeth Lyons Wise	1856	1860	Henry A. Wise	
33		Susan Holt Letcher	1860	1861	John Letcher	
34		Julia Augusta Robertson Pierpont	1861	1868	Francis Harrison Pierpont	Early founder and adopter of "Decoration Day" (now known as Memorial Day) in the United States
35		Olive E. Evans	1869	1874	Gilbert Carlton Walker	
		None	1874	1878	James L. Kemper	Kemper was a widower
		None	1878	1882	Frederick Holliday	Holliday was a widower
36		Louisa Cameron	1882	1886	William E. Cameron	
37		Ellen Bernard Fowle Lee	1886	1890	Fitzhugh Lee	
38		Annie Clay McKinney	1890	1894	Philip W. McKinney	
39		Jennie Wickliff Knight O'Ferrall	1894	1898	Charles Triplett O'Ferrall	
40		Sue Hammet Tyler	1898	1902	James Hoge Tyler	
41		Elizabeth Lyne Hoskins Montague	1902	1906	Andrew Jackson Montague	
42		Elizabeth Deane Lyons Swanson	1906	1910	Claude A. Swanson	Official hostess of the Jamestown Exposition
43		Etta Edloe Donnan Mann	1910	1914	William Hodges Mann	
44		Margaret Bruce Carter Stuart	1914	1918	Henry Carter Stuart	
45		Marguerite Inman Davis	1918	1922	Westmoreland Davis	Served as a nurse during the 1918 influenza epidemic in Richmond, for which she was featured in The New York Times. President of the Women's Munition Reserve during World War I.
46		Helen Ball Sexton Trinkle	1922	1926	Elbert Lee Trinkle	
47		Anne Douglas Beverley Byrd	1926	1930	Harry F. Byrd	
48		Grace Phillips Pollard	1930	1932	John Garland Pollard	Died in 1932 during husband's term
49		Violet E. MacDougall	1933	1934	John Garland Pollard	
50		Nancy Bane Gillespie Peery	1934	1938	George C. Peery	
51		Lillian Martin Price	1938	1942	James Hubert Price	
52		Constance Simons Du Pont Darden	1942	1946	Colgate Darden	
53		Eva Ellis Lovelace Dillard Tuck	1946	1950	William M. Tuck	
54		Janie Lipscombe Battle	1950	1954	John S. Battle	
55		Anne Bassett Stanley	1954	1958	Thomas B. Stanley	
56		Josephine Katherine Minter Almond	1958	1962	J. Lindsay Almond	
57		Lacey Barkley Harrison	1962	1966	Albertis Harrison	
58		Katherine Godwin	1966	1970	Mills Godwin	58th and 60th first lady of Virginia
59		Jinks Holton	1970	1974	Linwood Holton	Mother of the 67th first lady of Virginia, Anne Holton
60		Katherine Godwin	1974	1978	Mills Godwin	
61		Edwina P. Dalton	1978	1982	John N. Dalton	Served as a member of the Virginia Senate from the 12th district (1988–1992), Republican nominee for Lieutenant Governor in 1989
62		Lynda Bird Johnson Robb	1982	1986	Chuck Robb	Daughter of 36th U.S. President Lyndon B. Johnson, served as chairwoman of President's Advisory Committee for Women
63		Jeannie Baliles	1986	1990	Gerald Baliles	Founder of the Virginia Literacy Foundation
		None	1990	1994	Douglas Wilder	Wilder was divorced
64		Susan Brown Allen	1994	1998	George Allen	
65		Roxane Gilmore	1998	2002	Jim Gilmore	Gilmore, a classics professor at Randolph-Macon College, was the first woman to actively maintain her own independent job and career while serving as first lady.
66		Lisa Collis	2002	2006	Mark Warner	First woman to continue using her maiden name as first lady
67		Anne Holton	2006	2010	Tim Kaine	Daughter of Governor Linwood Holton and First Lady Jinks Holton, served as 17th Virginia Secretary of Education and acting president of George Mason University
68		Maureen McDonnell	2010	2014	Bob McDonnell	Sentenced to 12 months in prison after a federal corruption trial. The conviction was overturned and charges dismissed after a Supreme Court decision.
69		Dorothy McAuliffe	2014	2018	Terry McAuliffe	Appointed as the U.S. State Department Special Representative for Global Partnerships by President Joe Biden
70		Pamela Northam	2018	2022	Ralph Northam	
71		Suzanne Youngkin	2022	2026	Glenn Youngkin	
72		Adam Spanberger	2026	serving	Abigail Spanberger	First first gentleman of Virginia

== See also ==
- List of governors of Virginia
