= Parkerson =

Parkerson is a surname. Notable people with the surname include:

- Jo Parkerson (fl. early 21st century), British journalist
- Michelle Parkerson (born 1953), American filmmaker and academic
- William F. Parkerson Jr. (1920–2003), American lawyer and politician
