= Pigskin Club of Washington =

Sports organization in Washington, D.C

The Pigskin Club of Washington is an American sports organization based in the District of Columbia. Founded in 1938 by Dr. Charles B. Fisher, a former football player at Howard University, it is one of the oldest African American sports clubs in the country.

The organization's stated goals were "improving relationship between persons interested in the game of football; that there may be given encouragement for good, clean sport; that there may be a more perfect understanding among such persons; and, that there may be mutual benefits and pleasures derived from such association."

== History ==
Formal organization took place on the evening of Friday, October 7, 1938, at the 12th Street Branch YWCA. Officers elected were: President, Charles B. Fisher; Vice Presidents, Edwin B. Henderson and John R. Pinkett; Secretary George E. Brice and Treasurer, William H. Greene. There were 52 original Charter Members. By the time the organization held its Thirtieth Anniversary Awards Dinner membership had grown to over 500 representative leaders in civic, professional, religious, educational and community action areas of interest in the District of Columbia and ten Atlantic Seaboard States, men primarily concerned with stimulating clean, fair play and DEMOCRACY IN SPORTS at the high school, college and professional level of competition.

The Black Tie, 30th Anniversary Awards Dinner was held on December 9, 1967, at the D.C. Statler-Hilton. Special honored guests that night were; Vice President, Hubert H. Humphrey, Senators, Birch Bayh of Indiana, Edward Brooke of Massachusetts and Edward Kennedy of Massachusetts. Major National Intercollegiate Trophy Winners that night were Leroy Keyes, Purdue University; Granville Liggins, University of Oklahoma; Daryl Johnson, Morgan State University; and John Pont, Indiana University.

== Honorees ==
During the previous 29 years the Pigskin Club had honored the following National Intercollegiate All-American Football Players:

- Dick Bass, College of the Pacific
- Emerson Boozer, Maryland State
- Jim Brown, Syracuse University
- Robert Brown, University of Nebraska
- Bill Burrell, University of Illinois
- Ron Burton, Northwestern University
- Reggie Bush, USC
- Dick Butkus, University of Illinois
- Al Calcavanti, Bucknell University
- Howard Cassady, Ohio State University
- Gary Collins, University of Maryland
- Frank Cornish Jr., Grambling State University
- Ernie Davis, Syracuse University
- Oliver Dobbins, Morgan State University
- Earl Faison, Indiana University
- Bob Ferguson, Ohio State University
- Mike Garrett, University of Southern California
- Harry Harmon, University of Pittsburgh
- Kevin Hardy, Notre Dame
- Jerome Holland, Cornell University
- John Huarte, University of Notre Dame
- Rafer Johnson, UCLA
- Calvin Jones, University of Iowa
- Clinton Jones, Michigan State
- Walt Kowalczyk, Michigan State University
- Willie Lanier, Morgan State University
- Floyd Little, Syracuse University
- Tom McLuckie, University of Maryland
- Jim Marshall, Ohio State University
- Ollie Matson, University of San Francisco
- Bobby Mitchell, University of Illinois
- Lenny Moore, Pennsylvania State University
- Jim Nance, Syracuse University
- Mel Renfro, University of Oregon
- Pat Richter, University of Wisconsin
- Jackie Robinson, UCLA
- Johnny Sample, Maryland State College
- Duke Slater, University of Iowa
- Roger Staubach, United States Naval Academy
- Sandy Stephens, University of Minnesota
- Ralph Tyler, Livingstone University
- J. T. Williams, Oklahoma A&M
- Buddy Young, University Of Illinois
- Henry Young, Alabama A&M

The National Intercollegiate Football Coaches and Athletic Directors Honored were;

- Milt Bruhn, University of Wisconsin
- Hugh Daugherty, Michigan State
- Robert Devaney, University of Nebraska
- Clyde Engle, Penn State
- Forest Evashevski, University of Iowa
- Jake Gaither, Florida A&M
- Woody Hayes, Ohio State
- Eddie Jackson, Delaware State
- Eddie Hurt, Morgan State
- Vernon McCain, Maryland State
- Bill Nicks, Prairie View
- Ara Parseghian, Notre Dame
- Bert Piggot, North Carolina A&T
- Ben Schwartzwalder, Syracuse University
- Edward Robinson, Grambling University
- Jim Tatum, University of Maryland
- Brutus Wilson, Shaw University

The Pigskin Club has also honored Major League Baseball's Willie Mays and Maury Wills.
