= Roxane Gilmore =

American professor (1954–2024)

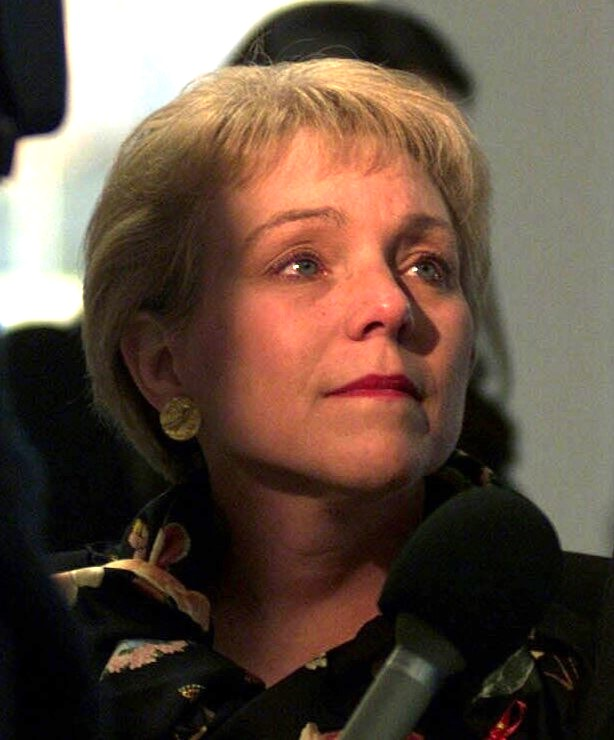
- Gilmore in 2001

First Lady of Virginia
- In role January 17, 1998 – January 12, 2002
- Governor: Jim Gilmore
- Preceded by: Susan Brown Allen
- Succeeded by: Lisa Collis

Personal details
- Born: Roxane Gatling; June 17, 1954 Suffolk, Virginia, U.S.
- Died: August 7, 2024 (aged 70) Richmond, Virginia, U.S.
- Spouse: Jim Gilmore (m. 1977–2024)
- Children: Two sons
- Education: University of Virginia (BA, MA)

Roxane Gatling Gilmore (June 17, 1954 – August 7, 2024) was an American educator, professor and academic. She served as First Lady of Virginia from 1998 to 2002 as the wife of Governor Jim Gilmore and oversaw the restoration of Virginia Governor's Mansion, the longest continually occupied governor’s residence in the United States. While holding the role of first lady, Gilmore continued her work as a classics professor at Randolph–Macon College, becoming the first First Lady in Virginia's history to actively maintain her own independent, professional career during her tenure.

== Biography ==
=== Early life and education ===
Gilmore was born Roxane Gatling on June 17, 1954. Her father, George Gatling, was a Virginia highway department road inspector and a descendent of Richard Jordan Gatling, the inventor the Gatling gun. Her mother, Jane Gatling, was a schoolteacher.

Gatling was diagnosed with Hodgkin's disease while in high school, which required radiation treatment at a hospital in Norfolk, Virginia. Her medical treatment forced her to quit the marching band and other extracurricular activities. She graduated from Suffolk High School in 1972 after the cancer went into remission.

She enrolled at the University of Virginia, where she pursued a Bachelor of Arts degree in history, classics, and anthropology. There, she joined the Jefferson Literary and Debating Society, the oldest continuously existing collegiate debating society in North America. In addition to its debates, the club was known for its keg parties and friendly heckling of debaters at its meetings. There, Roxane Gatling met her future husband, a Virginia law student named Jim Gilmore, at a debating society meeting in the Fall of 1974. Her Hodgkin's disease then returned during her senior year at college. Jim Gilmore accompanied her to chemotherapy treatments and hospitalizations. Gatling graduated from the University of Virginia in 1976. The Gilmores married on August 6, 1977. The couple had two sons, Jay Gilmore and Ashton Gilmore,

In 1978, Gilmore received her Master of Arts in ancient history, also from the University of Virginia.

=== Career ===
Rozanne Gilmore forayed into politics, but ultimately foccused on her teaching career. She began teaching at Randolph–Macon College beginning in 1983 as a part-time professor. She then worked as a Latin teacher at public high schools in Chesterfield and Henrico counties before returning to Randolph-Macon.

Roxane Gilmore later became a classics professor at Randolph–Macon College in Ashland, Virginia, where she taught Latin and a range of courses, including Greek and Roman history and literature, women in ancient literature, the history of Roman Britain, and epic poetry. She also worked with the Virginia Department of Education to create an online database of educational resources for students, teachers, businesses, and parents.

Upon becoming Virginia's first lady in 1998, Gilmore chose to actively continuing teaching at Randolph-Macon, becoming the first First Lady in state history to retain her own, independent career during her tenure. In a 1998 interview with the Washington Post, Larry Sabato of the University of Virginia Center for Politics, explained that, by keeping her career, Gilmore broke the mold for her predecessors at the time, "We've never had a first lady like Roxane Gilmore. This is a very traditional state. She's the first of a kind...In other places, even Arkansas, this happened a long time ago...We've had some very good, very active first ladies like Jeannie Baliles. But their lives have always been defined by their husband's job. Roxane is the first with a completely independent identity."

First Lady Roxane Gilmore oversaw the restoration of Virginia Governor's Mansion, the longest continually occupied governor’s residence in the United States. The mansion, built in 1813, was in need of repairs and restoration work when Governor Gilmore took office in 1998. Roxane Gilmore researched and toured dozens of homes across Virginia and the South to gather ideas that could be used in the renovations, including Monticello, Kenmore, Wickham House, and the John Marshall House in Richmond, Virginia. Gilmore and her family moved out in April 1998 once construction began and returned to governor's residence in November 1999 following its $5 million renovation. In 2012, Gilmore published a book, "Restoring the Virginia Governor’s House," describing her efforts to restore the mansion.

Additionally, as first lady, Gilmore worked with the Jamestown Foundation and its excavations of colonial Jamestown, Virginia. She also collaborated with the Virginia Tourism Corporation to promotion the state's cultural and recreational attractions.

Roxane Gilmore died following a lengthy illness on August 7, 2024, at the age of 70, just one day after her 47th wedding anniversary. She was buried in Henrico County on August 17, 2024.
