= Susan Brown Allen =

Former First Lady of Virginia

Susan Allen
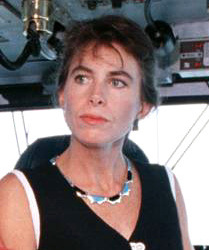
- Susan Allen in July 1996

First Lady of Virginia
- In role January 15, 1994 – January 17, 1998
- Governor: George Allen
- Preceded by: Office Vacant (1990–1994)
- Succeeded by: Roxane Gilmore

Personal details
- Born: Susan Brown; 1964 (age 61–62) Florida, U.S.
- Spouse: George Allen (m. 1986)
- Children: 3
- Education: University of South Carolina

Susan Allen (née Brown; born 1964) is an American author, political consultant, and talk radio host. She served as First Lady of Virginia from 1994 to 1998 as the wife of Governor George Allen.

== Early life and family ==
Allen was born Susan Brown in 1964 in Florida. She was raised in Virginia, with her family moving to Albemarle County after her father's service as a Marine Corps pilot during the Vietnam War. She graduated from the University of South Carolina.

In 1986, she married George Allen. They have three children and reside in the Virginia Beach area.

== Career ==
Allen worked in the hospitality industry, including as a hotel marketing director. Allen actively supported and campaigned for her husband throughout his political career and various campaigns for Congress, Governor, and the U.S. Senate, and has been described as his "secret weapon." She also authored an illustrated children's picture book about the life and career of Ronald Reagan, published by Regnery Publishing.

=== First Lady of Virginia ===
Allen became First Lady of Virginia in January 1994 upon her husband becoming the 67th governor of Virginia. As first lady, Allen was an active advocate for tourism in the state, children's issues, and drug intervention programs. As first lady, she appeared in national television commercials to promote family getaways in Virginia. Allen created the "Celebrate Virginia" campaign which promoted historic sites, main streets, and small towns in Virginia.

While First Lady, Allen also established the "First Lady's Breast Cancer Awareness Initiative," and co-chaired the Governor's Council on Physical Fitness with Denise Austin.

In 1994, Allen represented Virginia on a trade and tourism mission to South Africa. Allen represented Virginia on other trade missions in Asia, Europe, Canada, and Mexico. While First Lady, Allen chaired the Virginia Capitol Foundation and led the effort to place women's statues on the Capitol Grounds.

=== Post-First Lady ===
In the 2008 Presidential Election, Allen chaired "Women for McCain" in Virginia. During the Republican Party of Virginia convention in May 2008, Allen gave the nominating speech for John Hager for state party chair. In 2008, Allen hosted a weekly talk radio program on WDBT and has written and co-written political editorials.

She is an active campaigner and owns and operates SBA Concepts, LLC, a political consultancy. Her clients have included Anne Ferrell Tata, the Campaign for Honest Change, and her husband's campaign committees. In 2010, she was the chairwoman of the Republican Women's Federal Forum.

Allen served as co-chair on the inaugural committee for Virginia governor Bob McDonnell in 2009–10. She was also a founding member of the Jennifer Byler Institute. In 2012, Allen was appointed to the board of James Madison University. In the 2012 presidential election, she chaired "Women for Romney" in Virginia.

In 2013, Governor McDonnell appointed Allen to the Citizens' Advisory Council on Furnishing and Interpreting the Executive Mansion. In 2014, Allen was a member of a delegation led by the Center for Strategic and International Studies that traveled to Taiwan to compile the report "Taiwan's Marginalized Role in International Security."

In 2023, Allen was appointed to the board of visitors of Old Dominion University by Governor Glenn Youngkin. In the same year, she was also appointed to the Virginia Board of Conservation and Recreation. Allen also serves on the board of the Virginia Beach Rescue Squad Foundation and the American Veterans Center.

During the 2024 United States presidential election, Allen served on the board of "Moms for Safe Neighborhoods," a PAC supporting Donald Trump.

== Published works ==
- The Remarkable Ronald Reagan: Cowboy and Commander in Chief, 2013
