= J. J. Williams =

J. J. Williams may refer to:

- John J. Williams (soldier) (1843–1865), last soldier killed in Civil War
- James J. Williams (1853–1926), English-born photographer in Kingdom of Hawaii
- J. J. Williams (Oklahoma politician) (1867–1928), American politician from Oklahoma
- John James Williams (poet) (1869–1954), Welsh poet, pen name J.J. Williams
- John J. Williams (politician) (1904–1988), American Republican senator from Delaware
- J. J. Williams Jr. (1905–1968), American legislator from Virginia
- J. J. Williams (rugby union) (1948–2020), Welsh rugby union winger
- JJ Williams (soccer) (born 1998), American soccer forward
