= Paolo Zampolli =

Italian businessman (born 1970)

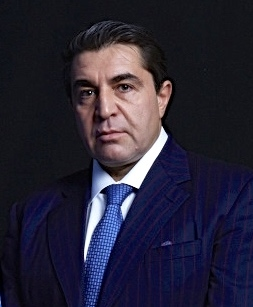

United States Special Representative for Global Partnerships
- In office March 11, 2025 – October 15, 2026
- President: Donald Trump
- Preceded by: Dorothy McAuliffe
- Succeeded by: Vacant

Personal details
- Born: March 5, 1970 (age 56) Milan, Italy
- Party: Republican
- Children: 1

Paolo Zampolli (born March 5, 1970) is an Italian-American socialite, businessman and former modeling agent. After migrating to the United States and founding a modeling agency, Zampolli became a close friend of Donald Trump, whom he introduced to his future wife, Melania Knauss, in 1998.

After moving out of modeling, Zampolli founded a real estate firm and held roles representing Dominica at the United Nations. In 2020, Trump named Zampolli to the Kennedy Center's board of trustees. In March 2025, during the second Trump administration, Zampolli was named special envoy for global partnerships, in which capacity he represented the United States in varied settings until he was fired amid conflicts with his superiors in October 2026.

== Early life and business career ==
Zampolli was born in Milan to a wealthy family. He claims to be distantly related to Pope Paul VI, and spent part of his youth at the castle of Azzate, which was owned by his family. His father, the owner of the toy company Harbert, died in a ski accident when Zampolli was 18. Zampolli dropped out of college to take over Harbert, but soon sold the company to a group controlled by Silvio Berlusconi in order to work in the fashion and modeling industries. Elite Model Management founder, John Casablancas, encouraged Zampolli to move to the United States after attending a 1994 fashion show Zampolli had organized in Ibiza, Spain.

In New York, Zampolli rented an apartment in Union Square and began working for Metropolitan Models. He soon befriended Donald Trump. On a scouting trip to Milan for Metropolitan in 1995, Zampolli met model Melania Knauss. In 1996, Zampolli sponsored her immigration to the United States via an H-1B visa. By then, he had founded his own modeling agency, ID Model Management. Knauss moved into Zampolli's building at Zeckendorf Towers, and Zampolli introduced her to Trump at a September 1998 party he hosted at the Kit Kat Club.

Zampolli attended Donald Trump and Melania Knauss's wedding in January 2005, and became acquainted with Bill and Hillary Clinton and Bill Clinton's advisers, including Doug Band and Democratic fundraiser Ron Burkle. Zampolli's relationship with Burkle deteriorated in 2006 after Zampolli arranged a failed meeting between Burkle and a columnist from the New York Post's Page Six, which had been covering Burkle critically. Zampolli and his agency appeared on Page Six "close to 54 times" in one year, and Zampolli hoped to improve Burkle's media coverage through a quid pro quo relationship with the column. The meeting ultimately resulted in claims of extortion and a criminal complaint.

In 2004, Zampolli made an unsuccessful bid to buy Elite Model Management at public auction, and ID Model's top model left the agency. Donald Trump invited him to join the Trump Organization, where he became Director of International Development in December 2004. In this role, he sold apartments at Trump Park Avenue. Zampolli soon left the Trump Organization to found his own real estate agency, Paramount Group, which used fashion models—mostly from his former agency, ID—as brokers to sell properties in Manhattan.

In 2008, Zampolli hosted an event at the UN headquarters to raise money for the International Renewable Energy Organization. In an interview with Diario de Ibiza a year later, Zampolli claimed that he was working as an advisor to the United Nations on climate change and was involved in negotiations surrounding the Kyoto Protocol, on which he was an "expert." In a 2010 article, Zampolli described himself as "United Nations Associations Brazil Ambassador at Large."

In 2011, Zampolli was named Minister-Counsellor to the Permanent Mission of the Commonwealth of Dominica at the United Nations. In October 2013, Prime Minister Roosevelt Skerrit, appointed Zampolli as United Nations Ambassador and Ambassador for Oceans and Seas for the Commonwealth of Dominica. In June 2014, Keith Mitchell, Prime Minister of Grenada, appointed Zampolli's wife Amanda Ungaro as United Nations Ambassador for Youth Affairs. Ungaro has worked under the 69th United Nations Vice President of the UN General Assembly for the Blue Economy. Zampolli has publicly used the title of "Ambassador" since his 2011 appointment.

== Trump administration positions ==
Zampolli (left) in Milan with Secretary of State Marco Rubio (February 2026)

In December 2020, Trump appointed Zampolli to the board of trustees of the John F. Kennedy Center for the Performing Arts. Zampolli remained on the board through the Biden Administration, and advocated for the addition of amenities to the center, such as a marina, a Cipriani restaurant, and a bridge connecting the center to Theodore Roosevelt Island. Zampolli also called for the establishment of overseas franchises of the center. In a February 2025 interview with Politico, Zampolli praised David Rubenstein, whom Trump removed from the center's chairmanship, and said that the Center "is not going anywhere". In January 2021, Zampolli was appointed to the President's Council on Sports, Fitness & Nutrition.

In February 2025, Zampolli represented himself as "Special Envoy to Italy", and was referred to as such by Matteo Salvini. However, the appointment was not official. Zampolli was instead named Trump's special envoy for global partnerships in March. In this capacity, he controversially advocated for Russia's reentry into global sports competition, including the Paralympic Games, which were hosted in Italy in 2026. He was also involved in the negotiation of mineral and airplane deals with Uzbekistan. He claimed to be "Boeing's number-two salesperson in the world, right after the president", which the company did not confirm.

In January 2026, Zampolli joined the American delegation to the World Economic Forum in Davos, where he brought a miniature of Arturo Di Modica's Charging Bull to the building hosting the delegation. Zampolli accompanied Vice President JD Vance to Hungary on April 7 to meet with Viktor Orbán ahead of the 2026 Hungarian parliamentary election. In April 2026, it was reported that Zampolli had asked FIFA and Trump to replace Iran with Italy in the 2026 FIFA World Cup. This was part of an effort by Zampolli to repair the relationship between Italian Prime Minister Giorgia Meloni and Trump after the two fell out over Pope Leo XIV's criticism of the Iran war.

Zampolli was fired on October 15, 2026, after it was reported that he and deputy Secretary of State Christopher Landau had had an extended, contentious email feud over what Landau said was Zampolli's regular failure to confine his work to cultural relationships. Zampolli claimed in response that he was accountable only to Trump and that business deals he had negotiated had been beneficial to American companies.

== Personal life ==
Zampolli moved to New York with Edit Molnar, a Hungarian model, and lived with her until at least 1996. In 2002, in Manhattan, he met Amanda Ungaro, a teen model from Londrina, Brazil. Ungaro had been brought to New York from Paris on Jeffrey Epstein's "Lolita Express". Her agent at the time was Jean-Luc Brunel, an alleged procurer of women for Epstein. When they met, Ungaro was 17 and Zampolli was 32.

According to Folha de S.Paulo, Zampolli and Ungaro married, and had a son, Giovanni Zampolli. The couple attended the first Trump inauguration, where they sat at Melania's table during dinner. The couple split in 2018, and permanently separated in 2021, with Zampolli claiming that a marriage never occurred. In 2025, Ungaro was arrested in Florida for conducting unlicensed cosmetic surgery procedures. She was subsequently deported from the United States, after Zampolli allegedly asked a senior Immigration and Customs Enforcement (ICE) official to detain her, in an effort to gain sole custody of their son. On January 21, 2025, Zampolli appeared at Trump's Starlight Inaugural Ball with model Maria Borges.

=== Relationship with Jeffrey Epstein ===
Zampolli's social circle overlapped with that of Jeffrey Epstein. Epstein patronized Zampolli's ID Model Management, and was a partner in Zampolli's 2004 bid to purchase Elite Model Management. Zampolli's name appears several times in the Epstein files. In one 2011 email, Epstein warned an Emirati businessman that "zampoli [sic] is trouble". In 2013, Zampolli was named as one of four partners in Ghislaine Maxwell's charity, the TerraMar Project.

On October 26, 2026, a report was released by Democrats on the House of Representative's Judiciary Committee examining Trump's ties to Epstein. According to the report, Zampolli was “an active participant” in the Epstein's alleged sex trafficking, citing multiple FBI reports included in the Epstein files. It alleges that Zampolli arranged U.S. visas for young female models, many of whom had sexual relationships with Zampolli, before they met Epstein. One FBI report mentioned that Zampolli arranged an 18-year-old model’s visa before she was recruited to give a massage at Epstein’s house, where Epstein allegedly raped her.

Zampolli himself has also been accused of rape and sexual assault in a separate case brought by model Victoria Drake, who alleges in an ongoing civil lawsuit that Zampolli drugged and raped her in 2023, an allegation which Zampolli has denied.
