= Edwina P. Dalton =

American politician

Eddy Dalton
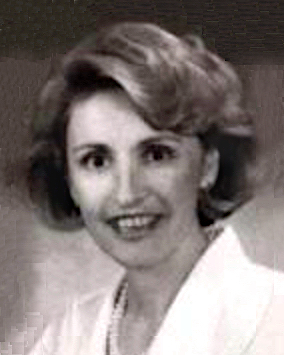
- Dalton in 1988

Member of the Virginia Senate from the 12th district
- In office January 13, 1988 – January 8, 1992
- Preceded by: Bill Parkerson
- Succeeded by: Walter Stosch

First Lady of Virginia
- In role January 14, 1978 – January 16, 1982
- Governor: John N. Dalton
- Preceded by: Katherine Godwin
- Succeeded by: Lynda Bird Johnson Robb

Second Lady of Virginia
- In role January 12, 1974 – January 14, 1978
- Governor: Mills Godwin
- Preceded by: Elizabeth McCarty Howell
- Succeeded by: Lynda Bird Johnson Robb

Personal details
- Born: Edwina Jeanette Panzer; June 12, 1936 (age 90) New York City, New York, U.S.
- Party: Republican
- Spouse: John Nichols Dalton (m. 1956; died 1986)
- Education: Radford University

Edwina Panzer "Eddy" Dalton (born June 12, 1936) is a former First Lady of Virginia. After the death of her husband, John N. Dalton, she ran as a Republican for the Senate of Virginia, serving one term from 1988 to 1992. In 1989, she ran unsuccessfully against Don Beyer for Lieutenant Governor of Virginia.

Senate of Virginia
Preceded by William F. Parkerson, Jr.	Virginia Senator for the 12th District; 1988–1992	Succeeded by Walter Stosch
Party political offices
Preceded by John Chichester	Republican nominee for Lieutenant Governor of Virginia; 1989	Succeeded by Michael Farris
