= Amanda Ungaro =

Brazilian model (born 1984)

Amanda Ungaro (born 1984) is a Brazilian former model. In the 2000s, she worked with Ford Models, Karin Models, and ID Models. In 2010, she left the fashion industry and served as a diplomat for the island of Grenada for several years. She was formerly the partner of Donald Trump confidant Paolo Zampolli; they separated in 2021.

== Early life ==
Amanda Ungaro was born in February 1984 in the city of Londrina, in Southern Brazil. She is a Brazilian citizen. Her father worked as a public clerk in the city. She left her hometown at age 13 to begin her modeling career. She traveled to São Paulo, Milan, Germany, Japan, and South Korea and was initially accompanied by her mother.

== Career ==
Ungaro had been represented by Ford Models in France. In 2002 she changed agencies and signed with Karin Models in Paris. In June 2002, as a 17-year-old teenage model, Ungaro boarded a flight from Paris to New York City on a plane owned by Jeffrey Epstein. She was accompanied by her modeling agent, Jean-Luc Brunel, who introduced her to Epstein and Ghislaine Maxwell. She said there were about 30 young girls on the plane, and that many appeared to be between the ages of 14 to 16 years old. She said Brunel repeatedly offered her a packet of drugs before they got off the plane, telling her to "put this in your bag" which she refused to do. In New York, she was signed to ID Models, an agency founded by the Italian businessman Paolo Zampolli. Ungaro said that months after ariving in New York, she began a relationship with Zampolli.

In 2010, Ungaro left the fashion industry. For several years, she served as a diplomat for the island of Grenada. In June 2014, Keith Mitchell, Prime Minister of Grenada, appointed Ungaro as United Nations Ambassador for Youth Affairs. Ungaro has worked under a 69th United Nations Vice President, of which there were 21, of the UN General Assembly for the Blue Economy, and served—at least pro forma—as Grenada's representative at the International Criminal Court and at Nuclear Non-Proliferation Treaty sessions.

Ungaro and Zampolli split in 2018, and permanently separated in 2021, with Zampolli claiming that a marriage had never occurred. After separating from Zampolli, she married a doctor from Brazil and lived in Aventura, Florida. Ungaro and her husband ran a medical spa that offered cosmetic surgery and Botox injections. In June 2025, Ungaro and her husband were arrested in Miami and charged with fraud, practicing medicine without a license, and other charges. They both pleaded not guilty.

Ungaro was placed in ICE custody (at Paolo Zampolli's behest) in Miami-Dade where she was detained for three and a half months. She requested of an immigration judge to be deported back to Brazil, where she had previous residency. Ungaro and Zampolli were engaged in a custody dispute over their teenage son, "G". On 7 April 2026, a series of tweets emerged threatening legal action, which had been sent in Ungaro's name to Melania Trump in the second term of the Trump presidency. Melania Trump held a surprise press announcement the next day denying any ties with Epstein. As of April 2026, Ungaro resides in Rio de Janeiro.
