= Dorothy McAuliffe =

American attorney (born 1963)

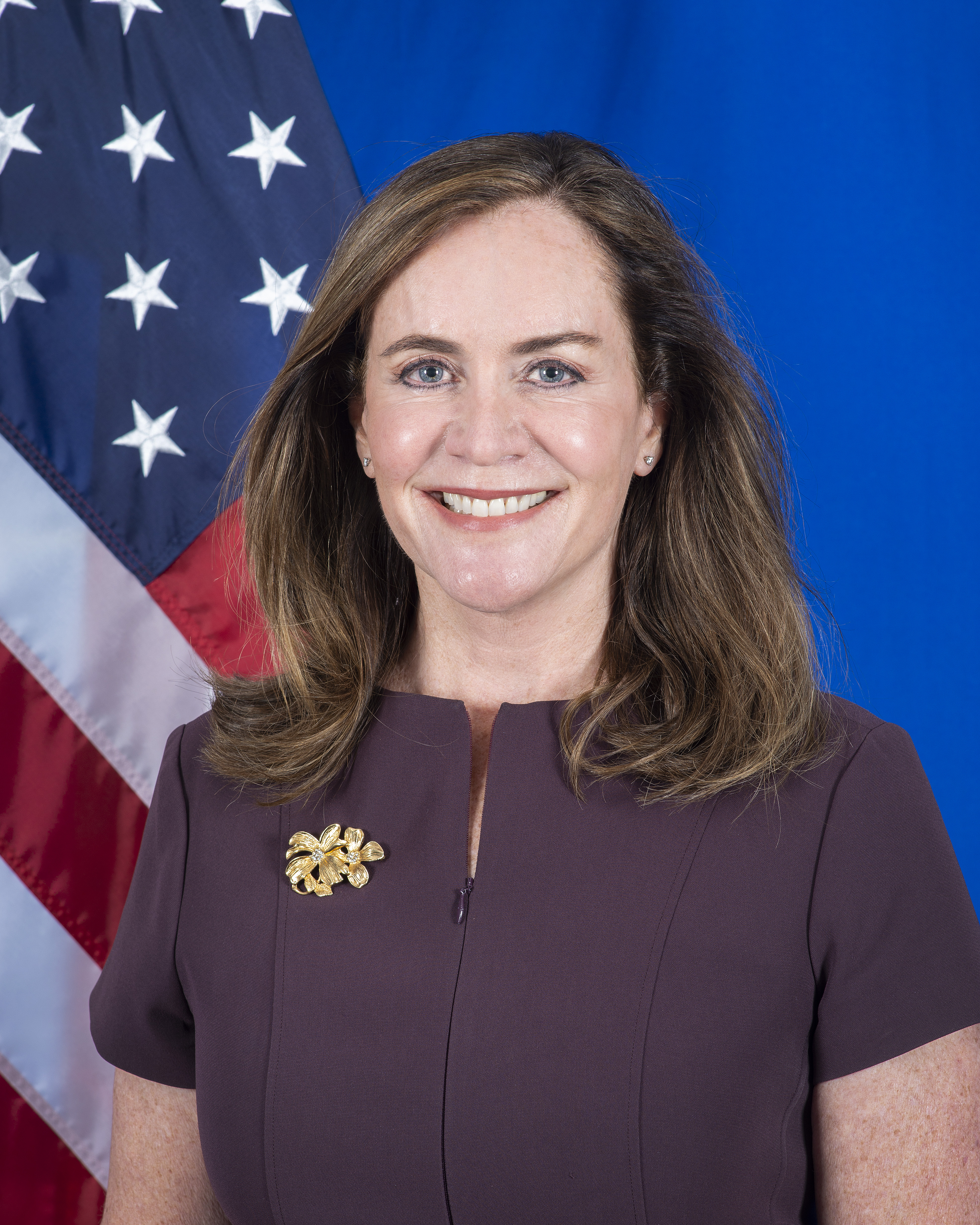
- Official portrait, 2022

Special Representative for Global Partnerships
- In office June 3, 2022 – January 20, 2025
- President: Joe Biden
- Preceded by: Position established
- Succeeded by: Paolo Zampolli

First Lady of Virginia
- In role January 11, 2014 – January 13, 2018
- Governor: Terry McAuliffe
- Preceded by: Maureen McDonnell
- Succeeded by: Pamela Northam

Personal details
- Born: Dorothy Swann; May 2, 1963 (age 63)
- Party: Democratic
- Spouse: Terry McAuliffe (m. 1988)
- Children: 5
- Education: Catholic University (BA); Georgetown University (JD)

Dorothy McAuliffe (née Swann; born May 2, 1963) is an American attorney who served as the U.S. State Department's Special Representative for Global Partnerships from 2022 to 2025. She previously was the First Lady of the Commonwealth of Virginia from January 2014 to January 2018.

== Early life and education ==
McAuliffe was born Dorothy Swann on May 2, 1963, to Richard and Doris Swann. She graduated from the Catholic University of America with a Bachelor of Arts in political science in 1985 and from the Georgetown University Law Center.

== Career ==
=== Early career ===
McAuliffe practiced banking and security law for several years and worked for the law firms of Thompson & Mitchell and Heron Burchette Ruckerett & Rothwell.

=== First Lady of Virginia ===
McAuliffe was the first Virginia first lady to set up an office in the Patrick Henry Building, where cabinet secretaries and agency heads work.

As First Lady of Virginia, McAuliffe launched and advocated for anti-hunger programs and food access initiatives in the state. In 2014, Terry McAuliffe created the Commonwealth Council on Bridging the Nutritional Divide and named Dorothy McAuliffe head of the council.

She also advocated for several programs to feed hungry children in schools, including a Breakfast after the Bell program, which made breakfast part of the school day, and programs that provided summer and after school meals for students with food insecurity.

McAuliffe also advocated for the creation of the Virginia Grocery Investment Fund, a fund set up to attract supermarkets to food deserts across the state.

McAuliffe served on the Virginia Council on the Interstate Compact on Educational Opportunity for Military Children, which helps military children integrate into new schools due to frequent moves while their parents are serving in the military.

In 2016, she initiated and led the effort for the addition of a disability ramp to Virginia's Governor's Executive Mansion.

=== Later career ===
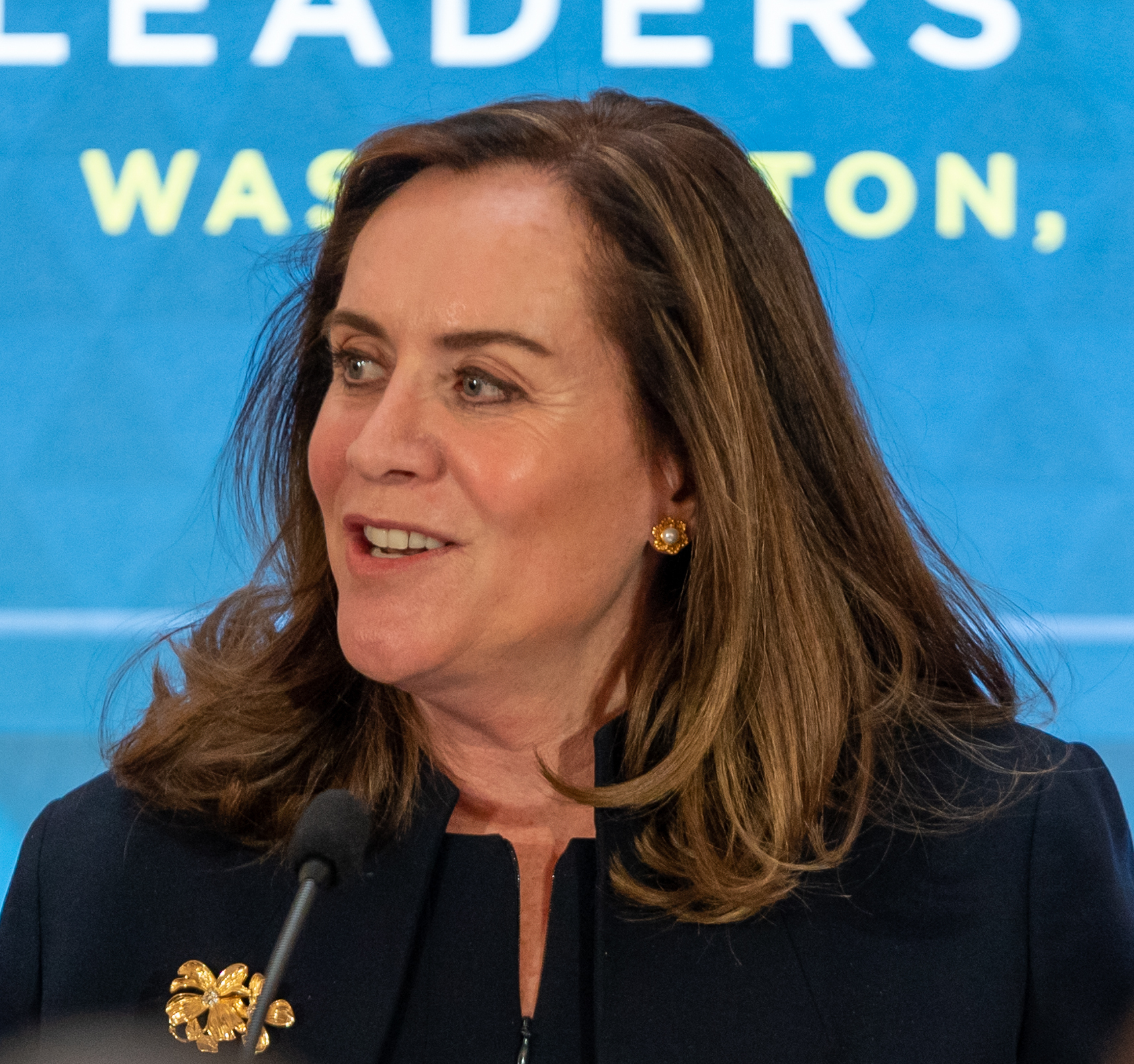
McAuliffe speaking at the U.S.-Africa Leaders Summit in 2022.

==== Non-profit work ====
She served on the boards of FoodCorps, the John F. Kennedy Center for the Performing Arts, and the Smithsonian Institution. After her term as First Lady of Virginia ended, McAuliffe joined Share Our Strength as the National Policy Advisor for the No Kid Hungry VA campaign.

==== Politics ====
In 2018, McAuliffe considered running for the Democratic nomination to challenge Rep. Barbara Comstock (R) for the U.S. House of Representatives in Virginia's 10th congressional district, but ultimately decided not to.

In 2020, McAuliffe advocated for the passage of a bill in Virginia that would allow workers up to 12 weeks of paid leave after the birth or adoption of a child, or to take care of a sick family member.

On June 3, 2022, it was announced that McAuliffe was appointed the Special Representative for Global Partnerships by President Joe Biden.

In March 2026, McAuliffe said she would run for Congress in Virginia's 7th congressional district. She dropped out on May 17, 2026 after the U.S. Supreme Court struck down the redistricting map which was approved in the 2026 Virginia redistricting referendum.

==== Academics ====
She was a spring 2018 fellow at the Georgetown Institute of Politics and Public Service.

== Personal life ==
McAuliffe married Terry McAuliffe on October 8, 1988. They have five children.

Honorary titles
Preceded by Maureen McDonnell	First Lady of Virginia; 2014–2018	Succeeded by Pamela Northam
