= Pamela Northam =

First Lady of Virginia from 2018 to 2022

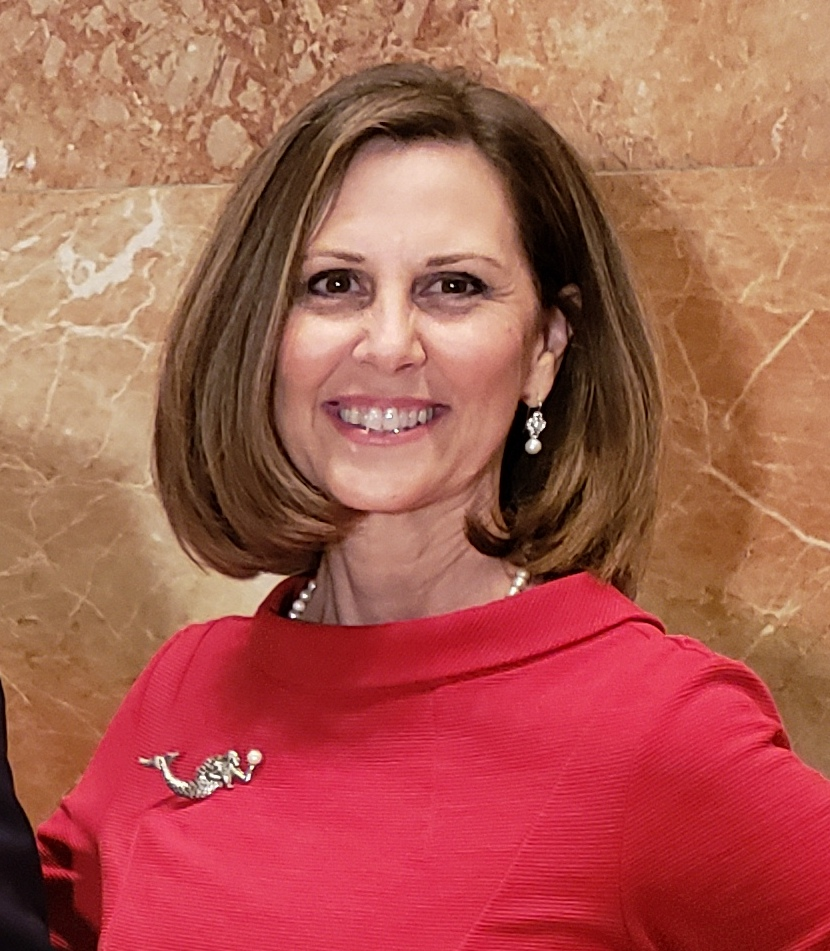
- Northam in 2018

First Lady of Virginia
- In role January 13, 2018 – January 15, 2022
- Governor: Ralph Northam
- Preceded by: Dorothy McAuliffe
- Succeeded by: Suzanne Youngkin

Second Lady of Virginia
- In role January 11, 2014 – January 13, 2018
- Preceded by: Jean Kincaid Bolling
- Succeeded by: Cerina Fairfax

Personal details
- Born: Pamela Thomas; June 18, 1963 (age 63)
- Party: Democratic
- Spouse: Ralph Northam (m. 1986)
- Children: 2
- Education: Baylor University (BS); University of Texas, Galveston (MD)
- Occupation: Educator; environmentalist

Pamela Northam (née Thomas; born June 18, 1963) is an American educator and environmentalist who served as First Lady of Virginia from 2018 to 2022 and Second Lady of Virginia from 2014 to 2018 as the wife of Governor Ralph Northam.

== Early life and education ==
Northam was born on June 18, 1963, the daughter of Robert Neil Thomas and Betty Rae McCloskey. She was educated at Baylor University and the University of Texas Medical Branch.

== Career ==
Northam worked as a pediatric occupational therapist and a high school science teacher. She also served as the community outreach coordinator for the environmental nonprofit Lynnhaven River NOW.

=== First Lady (2018-2022) ===
Upon becoming Virginia's first lady in 2018, Northam chaired the Virginia Children's Cabinet and led efforts to expand upon and improve early childhood education in Virginia. Northam maintained an office in the Patrick Henry Building along the Governor and his cabinet secretaries, and also chaired the Virginia STEM Education Commission during her tenure as First Lady.

The Washington Post described her as "a political force in her own right" and she was widely credited for increased enrollment in childcare programs, the first enrollments of three year old children in state childcare programs, and the state doubling its funding for public pre-K programs. Northam also led the effort to enact legislation forming a new Division of Early Childhood Education at the Virginia Department of Education, and chaired the Home Visiting Leadership Council.

In 2018, Northam served on a newly formed state commission to study the possibility of offering child care to state employees in Richmond. During her tenure as First Lady, Northam expanded the historical tour and educational programs at the Virginia Governor's Mansion to tell the full history of the enslaved African Americans who worked in the home's history. In the same year, she also served as a member of the Host Committee for the Virginia Women Veterans Summit. In 2018, Northam also dedicated the first electric vehicle charging station in a Virginia State Park and the newly erected Virginia Women's Monument.

In 2018, Northam was selected as commencement speaker for Virginia Wesleyan University's first formal graduation ceremony as a university. In 2020, the First Lady and Governor both tested positive for COVID-19 after one of their staff members became infected. The governor was asymptomatic while Northam suffered mild symptoms. In the aftermath of the COVID-19 pandemic, Northam launched a statewide "Resiliency Tour" to visit health centers, community organizations, and small businesses who were engaged in community recovery and relief efforts.

In 2019, Northam received widespread criticism after an incident where she handed cotton to some African American students and asked them to imagine what it was liked to be enslaved. In response, Northam apologized and stated that she had "provided the same educational tour to Executive Mansion visitors over the last few months and used a variety of artifacts and agricultural crops with the intention of illustrating a painful period of Virginia history."

In 2021, Northam was a guest on multiple episodes of the VPM series Fitness DAWGS.

In 2022, Northam was a contributor to the cookbook The Red Truck Bakery Farmhouse Cookbook. Northam has served on the board of trustees of the Science Museum of Virginia and the Elevate Early Education (E3) School in Norfolk, Virginia. A portrait of Northam is included in her husbands official gubernatorial portrait which is on display in the Virginia State Capitol.

Upon the completion of her husband's term in office, the Virginia General Assembly passed a bipartisan joint resolution commending Northam for being an "advocate for expanded access to quality early childhood education," "expanding and unifying Virginia’s early childhood system to reach more than 50,000 students," and "always encouraging bipartisanship throughout her work."

=== Post-First Lady (2022-present) ===
After serving as First Lady, Northam was appointed as a senior advisor at the Hunt Institute and a member of the board of Wetlands Watch. She also joined the steering committee of the "Minus 9 to 5" network of Old Dominion University.

In 2023, Northam became the honorary chairwoman of the "Roe Your Vote Virginia" reproductive freedom PAC, which focuses on electing abortion-rights candidates to the General Assembly.

Northam was considered a potential candidate to challenge Jen Kiggans in Virginia's 2nd congressional district in the 2026 midterms, but ultimately did not run.

== Personal life ==
Northam and her husband were married in 1986 and reside in Norfolk, Virginia. They have two adult children, Wes and Aubrey.

Honorary titles
Preceded by Maureen Patricia Gardner	Second Lady of Virginia; 2014–2018	Succeeded by Cerina Fairfax

Honorary titles
Preceded by Dorothy McAuliffe	First Lady of Virginia; 2018–2022	Succeeded by Suzanne Youngkin
