= Mark Emblidge =

- Born: 1953 (age 72–73); Upstate New York, U.S.
- Education: Gordon College B.A. 1975; University of Virginia M.Ed. 2004; University of Virginia Ph.D. 2005
- Occupations: Associate Professor, Teaching and Learning, Virginia Commonwealth University; Director, Literacy Institute; Executive Director, Virginia Literacy Foundation; Executive Director, Communities in Schools, Virginia; Member of the board, The Library of Virginia
- Political party: Democrat
- Board member of: Library Board of Virginia
- Spouse: Roberta (Robbie)
- Children: Catherine, Caroline
- Website: Profile at VCU (archive)

Mark E. Emblidge (born 1953) is a college professor and political activist who has focused his career on policy issues related to literacy in the United States for at-risk populations from childhood through adulthood.

== Early life and education ==
Emblidge was born in Upstate New York in 1953. His family is of Dutch Irish descent. He graduated from Oakton High School in Vienna, Virginia, and received a BA in political science at Gordon College, Massachusetts, and a master's degree and doctorate in education from the University of Virginia.

== Career ==
=== Politics and government ===
Beginning in the 1980s, Emblidge has worked for the Democratic Party on the state and national levels. He worked as the financial director of Chuck Robb's Virginia gubernatorial campaign in 1981 and as the Democratic Party's national finance director from 1982 to 1983. In 1983 and 1984, he worked on John Glenn's campaign in the 1984 Democratic presidential primary.

In 1985, he served as the transition director for Virginia's Attorney General-elect Mary Sue Terry and on the education transition team for Virginia Governor-elect Timothy M. Kaine (November 2005-January 2006). In 1987, Emblidge was the founding Executive Director of the Virginia Literacy Foundation (VLF) in Richmond, Virginia, which he established with Virginia's former first lady, Jeannie Baliles, a position he continues to hold to this day. The VLF provides grants and technical advice and training to Virginia's community-based and faith-based literacy organizations.

In 1995, President Bill Clinton appointed Emblidge to the advisory board of the National Institute for Literacy (NIFL), now known for its LINCS (Literacy Information and Communication System) resources, on which he served as chair from 1998 to 2002. NIFL was a federally funded organization that provided information to literacy programs about literacy rates and learning techniques for adults and children.

In 1999, he oversaw a Bill and Melinda Gates Foundation grant, and became the founding director of Communities in Schools (CIS) of Virginia, which he started with U.S. Senators Mark Warner and George Allen. CIS develops alternative remedies for at-risk juvenile students who are in danger of dropping out of high school.

In 2002, Emblidge was appointed President of the Board of Education in Virginia by Governor Mark R. Warner, and held that position until January 2010. "The fact that we have 92 percent of our schools fully accredited is wonderful, but there are still students who are not passing the tests. We also want to take a look at those students who have no difficulty passing the SOL tests and figure out how we can continually challenge them, so that when they graduate they can compete with anyone in the world.", Emblidge said about his work.

In 2009, outgoing Governor Timothy M. Kaine appointed Emblidge to the board of trustees of the Library of Virginia, and he became its chair in 2013.

In 2010, Emblidge was a Fellow with the U.S. Department of States, where served in the Office of the United States Special Envoy to Sudan as a special education advisor and worked with General Scott Gration in designing education programs for Sudan. While there, he urged the Sudanese government to seek contributions to education from the private sector and other countries, and to invite Sudanese dispersed throughout the world to return to their country to use their talents to develop education. From 1987 to 1990, during Margaret Thatcher's tenure, he worked as a consultant with the Communities in Schools of Great Britain.

=== Virginia Commonwealth University ===
Emblidge currently serves as an affiliate professor at the School of Education at Virginia Commonwealth University (VCU) in Richmond, Virginia.

In 2004, he became the Director of the Literacy Institute at VCU. Established to provide research and development projects that study the problems of illiteracy, the Literacy Institute has attracted three Early Reading First grants from the U.S. Department of Education from 2004 through 2011, totaling over $12 million. The grants, which focused on children and adults in poverty, resulted in a project called "Excell" (Excellence in Children's Early Language and Literacy), which promotes early language and literacy acquisition for pre-K students in various communities and schools throughout Richmond, Virginia. Emblidge served as the three grants' principal investigator.

== Personal life ==
Emblidge is married to Roberta (Robbie) née Banning. They have two daughters, Catherine and Caroline. He lives in Richmond, Virginia.
