= 1989 Virginia lieutenant gubernatorial election =

- November 7, 1989
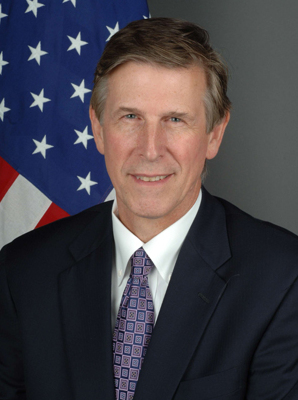

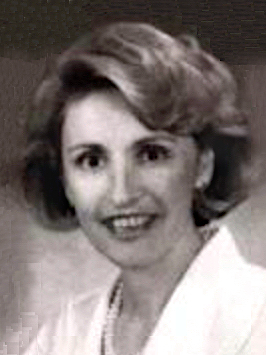
| Nominee | Don Beyer | Edwina P. Dalton |
| Party | Democratic | Republican |
| Popular vote | 934,377 | 791,360 |
| Percentage | 54.14% | 45.86% |
- Beyer: 50–60% 60–70% 70–80% Dalton: 50–60% 60–70%
Lieutenant Governor before election
Douglas Wilder
Democratic
Elected Lieutenant Governor
Don Beyer
Democratic

The 1989 Virginia lieutenant gubernatorial election was held on November 7, 1989. As incumbent Lieutenant Governor Douglas Wilder chose to not seek re-election and instead ran successfully for 1989 Virginia gubernatorial election. Democratic nominee Don Beyer defeated Republican nominee Edwina P. Dalton with 54.14% of the vote.

== General election ==
=== Candidates ===
- Don Beyer, Democratic, Businessman
- Edwina P. Dalton, Republican, State Senator

=== Results ===
1989 Virginia lieutenant gubernatorial election
| Party | Candidate | Votes | % | ±% |
|---|---|---|---|---|
| Democratic | Don Beyer | 934,377 | 54.14% | |
| Republican | Edwina P. Dalton | 791,360 | 45.86% | |
| Majority | | 143,017 | | |
| Turnout | | | | |
| Democratic hold | | Swing | | |
