= Robert P. Dean =

American politician and farmer

Member of the Maryland Senate from the Queen Anne's County district
- In office 1954–1967

Member of the Maryland Senate from the 15th district
- In office 1967–1971

Personal details
- Born: 1909 Ridgely, Maryland
- Died: 1984 (aged 74–75)
- Party: Democratic
- Education: Washington College

Robert P. Dean (1909–1984) was an American farmer, Merchant Marine, and Democratic politician born in Ridgely, Maryland, in Caroline County. He graduated from Washington College in 1931. Dean was a four-term Maryland State Senator representing the Upper Eastern Shore from Queen Anne's County starting in 1954 through 1967. Following a redistricting in 1967, Dean represented District 15 until his defeat in 1971. served on committees that included Judicial Proceedings, Finance, Banking and Insurance, Agriculture and Natural Resources, and the Chesapeake Bay and its Tributaries. He was instrumental in the organization of Chesapeake College and Tuckahoe State Park in his district.

His brother was three-term Caroline County Commissioner Charles T. Dean Sr.

== Resources ==
- Baltimore Sun, February 24, 1984 (accessed June 19, 2008).
