= Joseph A. Wickes =

American politician and judge (1826–1915)

Joseph Augustus Wickes
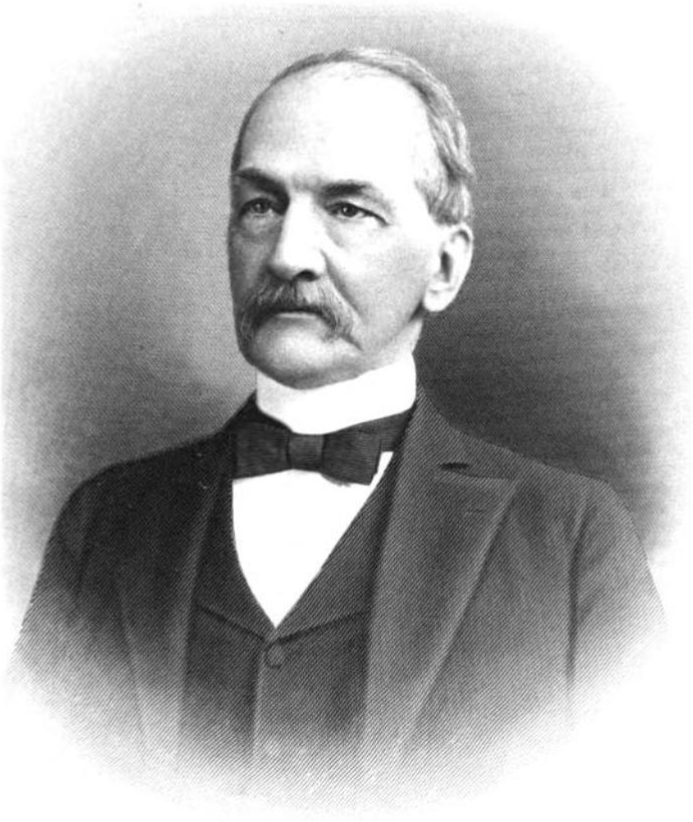
- Portrait of Wickes in 1912 book

Judge of the Second Judicial Circuit Court of Maryland
- In office 1869–1897

Member of the Maryland House of Delegates
- In office 1856

Personal details
- Born: September 27, 1826 Chestertown, Maryland, U.S.
- Died: May 18, 1915 (aged 88) Chestertown, Maryland, U.S.
- Party: Democratic
- Spouses: Anna Maria Tilghman (m. 1848; died 1864) Anna Rebecca Wickes (m. 1865; died 1889) Gladys Robinson (m. 1893)
- Children: 9
- Education: Washington College; Princeton University; University of Maryland
- Occupation: Politician; judge; lawyer
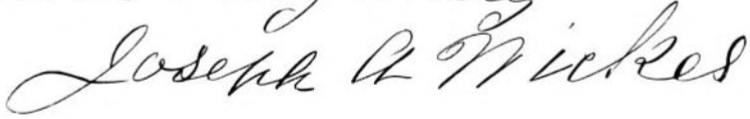
- Signature

Joseph Augustus Wickes (September 27, 1826 – May 18, 1915) was an American politician and judge. He served in the Maryland House of Delegates, representing Allegany County, in 1856. He served as a judge in Maryland's Second Judicial Circuit Court from 1869 to 1897.

== Early life ==
Joseph Augustus Wickes was born on September 27, 1826, in Chestertown, Maryland, to Elizabeth (née Chambers) and Joseph Wickes. His father was a soldier in the War of 1812 and participated in the Battle of Cork's Hill. He was also the deputy attorney general for Kent and Cecil Counties. Wickes is a descendant of Major Joseph Wickes who came to America from England in 1650 and served as a judge in Kent County.

Wickes attended Washington College in Chestertown. He graduated from Princeton University in 1845. He then studied medicine at the University of Maryland and graduated in 1848. Wickes then studied law under his father and was admitted to the bar in 1852.

== Career ==
Wickes was a Democrat. He was an elector at the 1852 Democratic National Convention. In 1854, Wickes moved to Cumberland to pursue a law career. He was elected to the Maryland House of Delegates, representing Allegany County in 1855. He served in 1856 and was a member of the judiciary committee.

In 1858, Wickes health declined and he moved back to Chestertown. In 1859, he started a law practice in Chestertown. He continued practicing until 1866, when he was appointed as a delegate to the 1866 National Union Convention. He was then elected as a delegate from Kent County for a constitutional convention, resulting in the Maryland Constitution of 1867.

Wickes was nominated as a judge for the Second Judicial Circuit Court, representing Cecil, Kent, Queen Anne, Caroline and Talbot counties, under the new constitution. He was elected for a term of fifteen years in 1869, alongside John Mitchell Robinson and Frederick Stump. He was re-elected for another term of fifteen years again in 1882. In 1896, when he had reached the age limit, a joint resolution was passed in the Maryland legislature to extend his term to its expiration (two years beyond the constitutional age limit). He retired in 1897.

For more than thirty years, Wickes was president of the board of visitors and governors of Washington College.

== Personal life ==
Wickes married Anna Maria Tilghman in 1848. They had five children, including Mrs. Thomas Hines, Mrs. Louise Houston and Mrs. Carrie Kennard. She died on April 2, 1864. Wickes married Anna Rebecca Wickes, daughter of Colonel Simon Wickes, in November 1865. They had two children, including Mrs. Joseph Wilkins. She died on October 17, 1889. In November 1893, Wickes married Gladys Robinson, daughter of Doctor Porter Robinson. They had two children: Gladys and Joseph. His brother was Judge Pere L. Wickes.

Wickes died on May 18, 1915, at his home in Chestertown.
