= William F. Parkerson Jr. =

American politician

Bill Parkerson
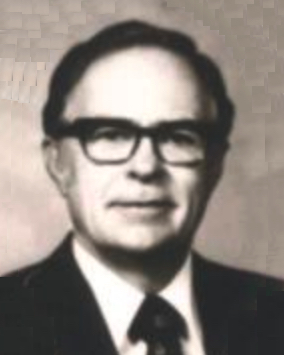

President pro tempore of the Virginia Senate
- In office July 17, 1986 – January 13, 1988
- Preceded by: Edward E. Willey
- Succeeded by: Stanley C. Walker

Member of the Virginia Senate
- In office January 8, 1964 – January 13, 1988
- Succeeded by: Eddy Dalton
- Constituency: 34th district (1964‍–‍1966); 31st district (1966‍–‍1972); 12th district (1972‍–‍1988)

Member of the Virginia House of Delegates from Henrico County
- In office January 10, 1962 – January 8, 1964
- Preceded by: J. J. Williams Jr.
- Succeeded by: T. Dix Sutton

Commonwealth's Attorney for Henrico County
- In office February 1, 1957 – December 31, 1961
- Preceded by: Edmund W. Hening Jr.
- Succeeded by: H. Ratcliffe Turner

Personal details
- Born: William Francis Parkerson Jr. June 16, 1920 Rocky Mount, North Carolina, US
- Died: January 23, 2003 (aged 82) Henrico, Virginia, US
- Party: Democratic
- Spouses: Nancy Ellen Davis (m. 1943; died 1973); Joyce Louise Haithcock (m. 1975)
- Education: University of Richmond; Washington & Lee University

Military service
- Branch/service: United States Army
- Rank: Colonel
- Battles/wars: World War II

William Francis Parkerson Jr. (June 16, 1920 – January 23, 2003) was an American lawyer and politician who served in both houses of the Virginia General Assembly, rising to become the president pro tempore of the Virginia Senate (where he had served for two decades).

== Early life, education and military service ==
Born in Rocky Mount, Edgecombe County, North Carolina in 1920 to the former Kathleen Murill and her husband, who became William F. Parkerson Sr. after naming his firstborn son after himself. Several generations of Parkersons were from the Hampton Roads area of Virginia and his mother's family from North Carolina. After earning an undergraduate degree from the University of Richmond in 1941, Parkerson became an officer in the U.S. Army during World War II. He rose to the rank of captain, then served in the Judge Advocate General Corps of the U.S.Army Reserve and rose to the rank of colonel. Using the GI Bill, after his wartime service, Parkerson attended the Washington and Lee University Law School, graduating in 1947.

== Career ==
Admitted to the Virginia bar in 1946, Parkerson served as Commonwealth's Attorney for Henrico County. After leaving for private legal practice, he won election as a Democrat to the Virginia House of Delegates in 1961, during the state's Massive Resistance crisis. In 1963 he won election to the Virginia Senate, and would win re-re-election multiple times, as well as became the Senate's president pro tempore, following the death of Edward E. Willey in 1986. However, that position proved brief, as former First Lady of Virginia Eddy Dalton (a Republican) defeated his reelection bid in 1987, She retired after one term.

Parkerson described himself as a conservative, and served as chair of the Senate Courts of Justice Committee as well as was a member of the Finance, Rules, Local Government and Commerce and Labor committees. He repeatedly introduced bills to create merit-based judicial selection procedure, which several times passed the senate but never the house. He considered his most significant contribution as an elected official to be creation of the Science Museum of Virginia. He later served as chairman of the Virginia Lottery board.

== Personal life ==
Parkerson married Nancy Ellen Davis in 1943, and they raised two sons and two daughters before she died in 1973. In 1975 Parkerson remarried, to the former Joyce Haithcock.

Senate of Virginia
Preceded by	Virginia Senator for the 12th District; 1972–1988	Succeeded by Edwina P. Dalton
