= Jo Parkerson =

British broadcast journalist

Jo Parkerson is a British journalist and entertainment director known for her role at Bauer Media Group, where she leads the Entertainment Hub. Her work involves managing a team to create and distribute celebrity and entertainment content for popular brands like KISS, heat, and Magic Radio

== Career ==
Parkerson began her career in radio, working as a "Showbiz" editor at LBC and as a host for Galaxy Digital, where she covered celebrity news and major events. Her move to Bauer Media Group allowed her to leverage her experience on a broader scale. As the Entertainment Content Director, she oversees the production of celebrity interviews, multimedia projects, and lifestyle content.
