= Jeannie Baliles =

First Lady of Virginia

First Lady of Virginia
- In role January 18, 1986 – January 13, 1990
- Governor: Gerald Baliles
- Preceded by: Lynda Bird Johnson Robb
- Succeeded by: Office Vacant (1990–1994)

Personal details
- Born: Jeannie McPherson Patterson North Carolina, U.S.
- Spouse: Gerald Baliles (m. 1965; div. 1996)
- Children: Laura Baliles; Jonathan Baliles
- Education: Washington College; Wesleyan University

Jeannie P. Baliles (born Jeannie McPherson Patterson) founded the Virginia Literacy Foundation, which was incorporated in 1987. She is the former wife of Gerald Baliles, the 65th Governor of Virginia, and served as First Lady of Virginia from 1986 to 1990.

== Early life and education ==
Jeannie McPherson Patterson Baliles was born in North Carolina and raised near Baltimore. She took her undergraduate and graduate degrees in history from Washington College (1962), and taught history until the birth of her first child. Ms. Baliles went on to earn a M.A.T. in history from Wesleyan University. She was inducted into the Delta Kappa Gamma honor society (education).

== Personal life ==
Ms. Baliles, who was divorced from Governor Baliles in 1996, has two children from the marriage, Laura and Jonathan.

== First Lady of Virginia and founder of Virginia Literacy Foundation ==
When Jeannie Baliles became First Lady of Virginia in 1986, she immediately named fighting adult illiteracy as a major societal issue that needed to be addressed. In 1987, she oversaw the founding of the Virginia Literacy Foundation (VLF) with founding director Mark Emblidge and has served as its chair ever since. Under her leadership, the VLF donates $200,000 per year in matching grants ($4 million so far) to grass roots literacy organizations that taught literacy skills to adults who read at or below basic literacy levels. Ms. Baliles was also instrumental in creating a public-private partnership that would oversee and prevent overlapping services among all community-based literacy organizations throughout the state. During her tenure as the nation's First Lady, Barbara Bush had publicized the plight of the millions of adults in America with low literacy skills, and had influenced the formation of many new grass roots adult literacy programs in the nation, and influential people like Jeannie Baliles. On page 330 of her 1995 Memoir, Mrs. Bush wrote about Ms. Baliles, "She is a ball of fire and has done a real job in her state and has shown real leadership in the field." The Foundation also partnered with the State Department of Education in the Virginia Literacy Initiative to encourage the spread of family and workplace literacy programs in the commonwealth. During the 1980s, this model was unprecedented in the nation. Each year the Jeannie P. Baliles Awards recognized the outstanding contributions of students, volunteers and program staff of Virginia's literacy organizations. In 1989, the Virginia Press Women voted Jeannie P. Baliles the Newsmaker of the Year as first lady of Virginia and leader in literacy programs.

== Other public service activities ==
In addition to continuing as chairman of the Virginia Literary Foundation and Baliles served as the Chairman of the Virginia Opera, and as a trustee on the Virginia Environmental Endowment, the Community Foundation of Central Virginia, and the Jenkins Foundation. She has also served on the board of Wolf Trap, the Nature Conservancy, the Jamestown-Yorktown Trust, YMCA, the Historic Richmond Foundation, and on the Board of Trustees of Virginia Union University and the Richmond Ballet. In 2008, Richmond Mayor Douglas Wilder appointed her to a charter-study commission to review the City Charter.
