= J. J. Williams Jr. =

American lawyer, banker, and politician

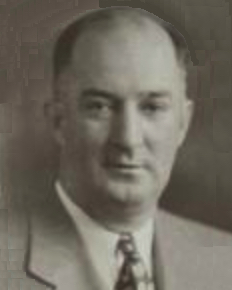

Member of the Virginia House of Delegates from Henrico County
- In office January 12, 1938 – March 28, 1960
- Preceded by: Harrison C. Eacho
- Succeeded by: Bill Parkerson

Personal details
- Born: Joseph Judson Williams Jr. July 20, 1905 Cold Harbor, Virginia
- Died: August 3, 1968 (aged 63) Gloucester County, Virginia
- Party: Democratic
- Spouse: Nellie Ruth Hoover
- Children: Betty Ann
- Education: University of Richmond; T. C. Williams School of Law
- Profession: Lawyer

Joseph Judson Williams Jr. (July 20, 1905 – August 3, 1968) was a Virginia lawyer and banker, who served part-time for more than two decades representing Henrico County, Virginia, in the Virginia House of Delegates. A member of the Byrd Organization, Williams participated in its Massive Resistance to racial integration, but left that political crisis to serve as a member of the Federal Home Loan Bank Board for the three years before his death.

== Early and family life ==
Williams was born in 1905 on a farm in Cold Harbor in Hanover County, Virginia, that had been contested during the American Civil War. His paternal grandfather, George Hugh Williams of Charlotte County, had served in the Confederate Army and was wounded during the Battle of Antietam near Sharpsburg, Maryland. After the war, he became a farmer in rural Hanover county, fathering ten children including this Williams' father and namesake Joseph J. Williams. The younger Williams' family included this J.J. Williams Jr. and seven siblings.

J.J. Williams Jr. attended Cold Harbor's public schools and graduated from Washington and Henry High School in 1922. He then attended the University of Richmond, receiving a B.A. in history and teaching that subject in Highland Springs High School for several years. He also played varsity baseball at the University of Richmond and later semi-professional baseball on the Everett-Waddey team that won the Virginia state championship in 1933. Williams also coached the Masonic Orphans Home team that won the American Legion junior state championship in 1930. In that year, Williams also received an LLB degree from the University of Richmond's T. C. Williams School of Law.

On June 30, 1928, Williams married Nellie Ruth Hoover, daughter of the minister of Newbridge Baptist Church, and they had a daughter Betty Ann. The family joined the Gethsemane Christian Church of Hanover.

== Career ==
Upon graduating law school and being admitted to the bar, Williams practiced under Charles W. Crowder and helped organize the Federal Savings & Loan Association in Sandston. He later served as director and General Counsel of the Franklin Federal Savings and Loan Association of Richmond. Williams also was active in his Presbyterian church, the Freemasons, Acca Temple Shrine, Odd Fellows, Elks, Eagles and Ruritans social organizations.

Throughout his life, Williams was active in Democratic party politics, becoming president of the Young Democratic Club of Fairfield district, a delegate to the state Democratic convention in Norfolk in 1936 and the third district secretary. He was elected to the Virginia House of Delegates on August 3, 1937, from Henrico County and re-elected many times.

After Senator Harry F. Byrd declared a policy of Massive Resistance to racial integration of Virginia's public schools, Virginia's legislators including Williams participated in a special section of the Virginia General Assembly called by Governor Thomas B. Stanley in August 1956. The legislation they enacted exceeded the recommendations of the Gray Commission on which State Senator Garland Gray and other Byrd loyalists sat, and for which David J. Mays served as counsel. Seven laws were directed against the NAACP and other organizations challenging racial segregation within the Commonwealth. Legislators overwhelmingly adopted them on September 29, 1956, despite Mays' opinion that courts would declare them unconstitutional, as eventually happened.

The Speaker of the House of Delegates appointed Williams (who was then chair of the Court and Justice Committee) and relative newcomer William F. Stone to serve on a new joint committee chaired by veteran delegate John B. Boatwright called the "Committee on Offenses against the Administration of Justice." The President of the Senate appointed E. Almer Ames Jr. of Onancock and Earl A. Fitzpatrick of Roanoke, to the committee (the latter becoming Vice-Chairman). As the session began in January 1957, it issued letters requesting information from the NAACP as well as the Defenders of State Sovereignty and Individual Liberties and other segregationist organizations. These activities prompted NAACP motions to quash the subpoenas in Richmond and several Virginia counties. In March 1957, the Boatwright Committee in March opined that various segregationist organizations did not commit the expanded legal offenses of champerty, maintenance, barratry, running and capping, nor the unauthorized practice of law. However, the commission's first report issued November 13, 1957, recommended enforcement of the laws against various named NAACP lawyers. The subpoenas and other activities soon reduced NAACP membership in Virginia by half. In the report issued in 1959 Boatwright again complained that the Virginia State Bar was spending $5000 on a Jamestown commemoration and $6350 on a new continuing legal education program, but not "punishing those guilty of unprofessional conduct and those engaged in the unauthorized practice of law" under the Stanley plan's 1956 ethics law expansion.

In 1960, Williams was nominated to the Federal Home Loan Bank Board and confirmed.

== Death ==
Williams died in Gloucester County, Virginia, on August 3, 1968.
