= J. T. Williams =

American football coach

Coaching career (HC unless noted)
- 1928–1930: Kentucky State

Head coaching record
- Overall: 9–9–3

J. T. Williams was an American football coach. He was the fifth head football coach at Kentucky State University in Frankfort, Kentucky, and he held that position for three seasons, from 1928 until 1930. His career coaching record at Kentucky State was 9–9–3.
