= Virginia Literacy Foundation =

American nonprofit organization

- Abbreviation: VLF
- Formation: 1987
- Type: 501(c)(3) organization
- Headquarters: Richmond, VA, United States
- Executive Director: Mark Emblidge
- Key people: Jeannie P. Baliles; Ruth Hazel Little; Troilen Gainey Seward
- Revenue: $674,974 (2015)
- Expenses: $780,541 (2015)
- Website: Official website

The Virginia Literacy Foundation (VLF), is an organization whose mission is to reduce adult illiteracy in Virginia by providing funding and technical support to private, volunteer adult literacy organizations that teach low level literacy adults to read and write with one-on-one instruction and tutoring. The VLF was founded by Jeannie Baliles, Virginia's First Lady from 1986 to 1990, and founding director Mark Emblidge, and was incorporated as a 501(c)(3) organization in 1987. The VLF supports grass roots organizations via challenge grants, direct consultation, and program development training with public partners like The Virginia Adult Learning Resource Center. The VLF also works in partnership with public institutions, corporations, and private literacy organizations in Virginia to address adult illiteracy in the workplace and to provide family literacy training to teachers and parents. The VLF is governed by the founding executive director, Mark E. Emblidge, and a board of directors chaired by Jeannie Baliles.

== Reducing illiteracy in Virginia ==
=== Adults ===
Despite a 25-year effort by the VLF and the organizations it supports to teach literacy skills to adults, Virginia still has 853,786 adults who never completed high school (2006 US Census American Community Survey). One out of five adults is considered functionally illiterate, and 662,715 lack basic prose literacy skills. These adults learn to read and write best through the customized one-on-one tutoring provided by the private community-based literacy organizations that the VLF supports through grants and training. The VLF's mission also supports developing workforce skills, at first through the Workforce Improvement Network in partnership with James Madison University, and with PluggedIn Virginia through its partnership with The Literacy Institute at Virginia Commonwealth University. In 2001, 34.1% of job applicants lacked the literacy skills needed to do the job they sought. Functionally illiterate adults have a profound impact on Virginia’s economy. Regions where adult illiteracy rates soar above 25-30% are unable to attract and retain businesses. Coincidentally, these regions also have the highest poverty rates in Virginia. Plugged In, which relies heavily on local business and community support is designed to help adults acquire literacy and workforce skills as they work towards a GED credential or community college credits.

=== Children ===
Knowing that children are 5 times more likely to drop out of high school if their parents are unemployed and lack a high school diploma, thereby perpetuating the cycle of intergenerational illiteracy, the VLF has concentrated its efforts on family literacy and working with parents, starting with Toyota Family Literacy Grants in the 1990s. ExCELL (Excellence in Children's Early Language and Literacy), one of the VLF's projects that resulted from a 2008 community partnership in Richmond's northside, helps pre-K children to get ready to learn to read through the development of early language and literacy skills.

== In support of Virginia's adult literacy organizations ==
=== Grant giving ===
Since it was established, the Foundation has funded grass roots literacy programs that have helped 200,000 adult Virginians learn to read. When the VLF was started, the organization supported 34 community- and faith-based literacy organizations across Virginia who served a total of 1,400 adults. In 2008, the number of adult students served per year by VLF supported organizations has jumped to 14,000 adult learners. The VLF has disbursed over $3.4 million in challenge grants since 1987 to fund data collections systems, program expansion and improvement, operating costs, staff salaries, and the purchase of equipment and supplies. The VLF has collaborated with important public/private partners such as the Virginia Department of Education and the Verizon Foundation, who have consistently awarded funds to help the VLF achieve its mission.

=== Training and workshops ===
In addition to the grants, the VLF provides technical support and advice and direct assistance with tutor training, board development, and strategic planning through its public partner, the Virginia Adult Learning Resource Center (VALRC). With a yearly grant budget of $200,000, the VLF funds from 26-32 non-profit adult literacy organizations per year. In order to qualify for VLF funds and workshops through the VALRC, these organizations must serve a minimum of 30 clients per year within their communities, follow promising practices in non-profit management, and demonstrate a willingness to strengthen and improve their programs through active collaborations and partnerships with community groups.

=== Annual conference ===
Each year, the VLF has sponsored an annual 2-day conference for all literacy programs in Virginia, including those that are too small to qualify for VLF grants. This conference, held in Richmond, provides workshops in program management, tutor training, EL/Civics, and learning disabilities and basic literacy teaching techniques.

== Public/private partnerships ==
The VLF's public/private partnerships have increased the organization's ability to address illiteracy in Virginia. While the VLF's mission primarily addressed the adult learner, the organization recognizes that the parent is the child's first teacher and that illiteracy must be addressed across an individual's lifespan from pre-K to adulthood. By partnering with other agencies with similar missions, the VLF has been able to work with a larger number of individuals through partner programs and their staff.

=== The Virginia Literacy Initiative ===
The initiative, which brought the public and private sectors together, was one of the first public-private partnerships of its kind in the nation. Founded in 1987 by the VLF and the Virginia Council for Adult Education and Literacy, the partnership increased the number of Virginians participating in literacy instruction from 24,309 in 1987 to over 55,000 in 1992.

=== The Virginia Adult Learning Resource Center ===
The VLF also partnered with the Centers for Professional Development (now the Virginia Adult Learning Resource Center (VALRC) at Virginia Commonwealth University and the Virginia Office of Adult Education at the Virginia Department of Education to establish the Literacy Training Office. Training consisted of free professional development and program development workshops and technical assistance training for private volunteer groups. In 2000, four literacy support coordinators representing four regions in Virginia, offered regional technical advice and support to over eighty non-profit literacy organizations through the Literacy Support Center, a unique collaborative public/private project that helped to strengthen literacy programs through training and mentoring. These four positions were consolidated into one, and today a literacy specialist, who works with both the VLF and the VALRC, ensures that training and technical services for nonprofit organizations are coordinated.

=== Regional Literacy Coordinating Committees ===
The VLF, along with the Office of Adult Education and Literacy at the Virginia Department of Education (OAEL VADOE), was also instrumental in organizing and facilitating cooperation among the many private and public adult literacy agencies and social services through fourteen Regional Literacy Coordinating Committees, which served the state through 2017, after the Workforce Innovation and Opportunity Act (WiOA) was passed and local public adult education and literacy programs were combined into 22 regions to meet the act's requirements for a one-stop delivery system.

=== The Literacy Institute ===
In 2002, the VLF partnered with Virginia Commonwealth University’s School of Education and Center for Public Policy to form The Literacy Institute. The Institute ensures that Virginia’s public policy makers are kept aware of the problem of illiteracy in the Commonwealth and to directly combat that problem through research and development projects.

== Promoting literacy across the lifespan ==
In the early 1990s, the VLF received a Toyota Family Literacy Grant, which allowed the organization to partner with Richmond Public Schools, Richmond Public Libraries, the Department of Social Services and other public entities in order to provide family literacy services for at-risk families. Since that time, the VLF has actively promoted family literacy, encouraging literacy programs to teach parents the literacy skills they need to obtain jobs or seek promotions and help their children with school work. Through its partnership with The Literacy Institute, the VLF has benefited from the expertise gained from three Early Reading First grants that totaled $12 million. In collaboration with the Robins Foundation and Richmond Public Schools, the VLF founded NoRF, now named Excell, a project that addressed the literacy needs of at-risk pre-K children who live in Richmond's north side. This research-based program has continued and expanded in Richmond, and is now named Excell.
