= Anne Holton =

American lawyer and judge (born 1958)

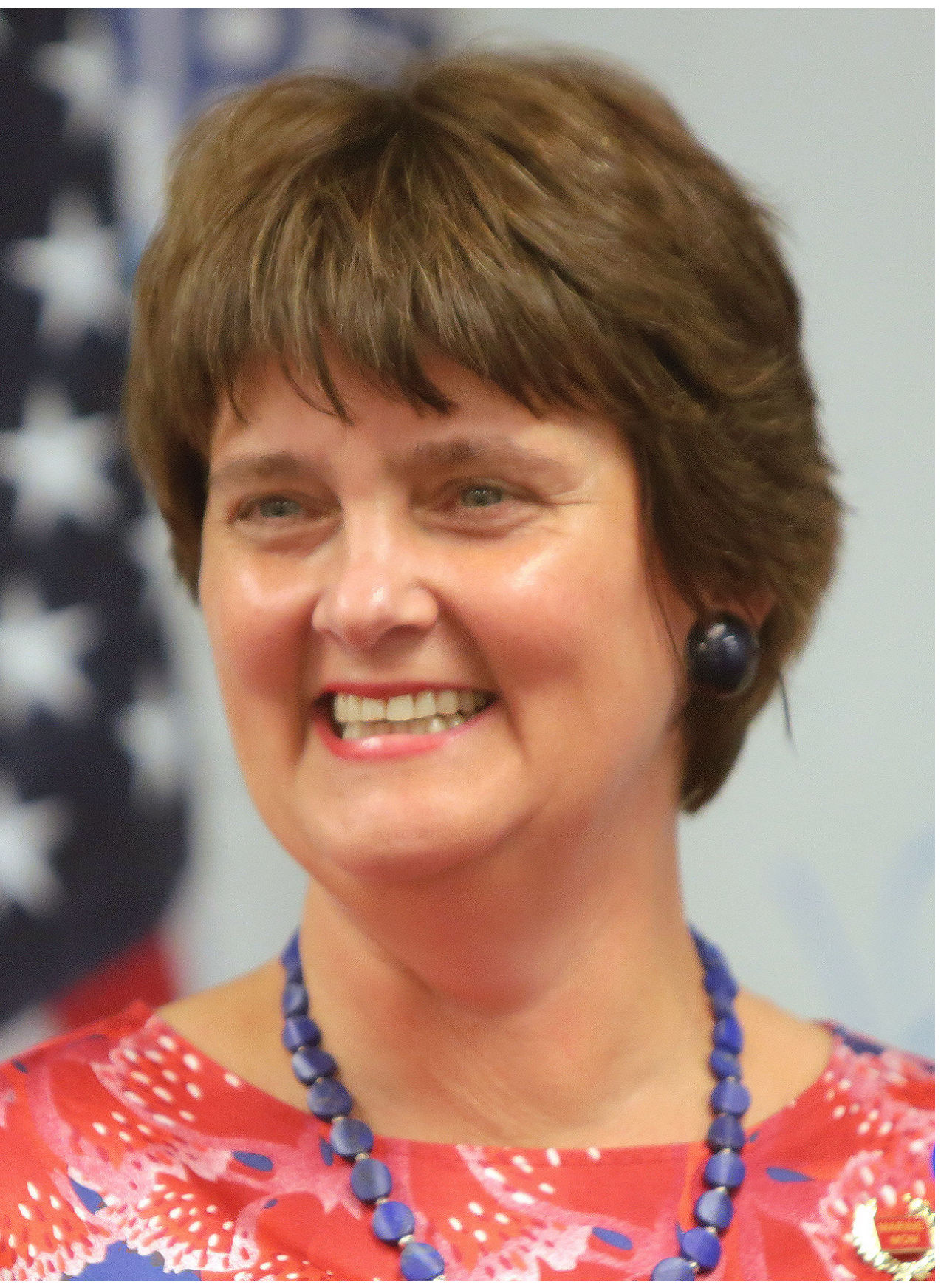
- Holton in 2016

President of George Mason University
- Acting; June 20, 2019 – June 30, 2020
- Preceded by: Ángel Cabrera
- Succeeded by: Gregory Washington

17th Virginia Secretary of Education
- In office January 11, 2014 – July 25, 2016
- Governor: Terry McAuliffe
- Preceded by: Javaid Siddiqi
- Succeeded by: Dietra Trent

First Lady of Virginia
- In role January 14, 2006 – January 16, 2010
- Governor: Tim Kaine
- Preceded by: Lisa Collis
- Succeeded by: Maureen McDonnell

Second Lady of Virginia
- In role January 12, 2002 – January 14, 2006
- Preceded by: Margaret Hager
- Succeeded by: Jean Bolling

Chief Judge of the Richmond Juvenile and Domestic Relations Court
- In office 2000–2003

Judge of the Richmond Juvenile and Domestic Relations Court
- In office June 30, 1998 – 2005

Personal details
- Born: Anne Bright Holton; February 1, 1958 (age 68) Roanoke, Virginia, U.S.
- Party: Democratic
- Spouse: Tim Kaine (m. 1984)
- Children: 3
- Parents: Linwood Holton; Jinks Rogers Holton
- Relatives: Woody Holton (brother); Dwight Holton (brother)
- Education: Princeton University (BA); Harvard University (JD)

Anne Bright Holton (born February 1, 1958) is an American lawyer and judge who served as the Secretary of Education for the Commonwealth of Virginia from 2014 to 2016. She is married to United States Senator and former Virginia Governor Tim Kaine, the vice presidential running mate of Hillary Clinton in the 2016 election. Holton served as First Lady of Virginia from 2006 to 2010. She served as interim president of George Mason University from 2019 to 2020.

== Early life ==
Born in Roanoke, Virginia, Holton is the daughter of Virginia Harrison "Jinks" (Rogers) and Linwood Holton, a lawyer and Republican Party politician. Her paternal grandfather was an executive at a small coal-hauling railroad. As a child, Holton started a club dedicated to service and good deeds. In 1969, her father was elected as governor of Virginia, as a Republican serving from 1970 to 1974.

When her father became governor, he first enrolled Holton in a prestigious grade school. In response to a federal court decision desegregating Richmond Public Schools, she and her siblings attended predominantly black schools, including Mosby Middle School, near the Virginia Executive Mansion. Holton attended Open High School, and graduated from Langley High School in 1976.

One of Holton's brothers is Woody Holton, a professor of history at the University of South Carolina. Another one of her brothers, Dwight Holton served as United States Attorney for the District of Oregon from February 2010 to October 2011.

== Education, marriage and children ==
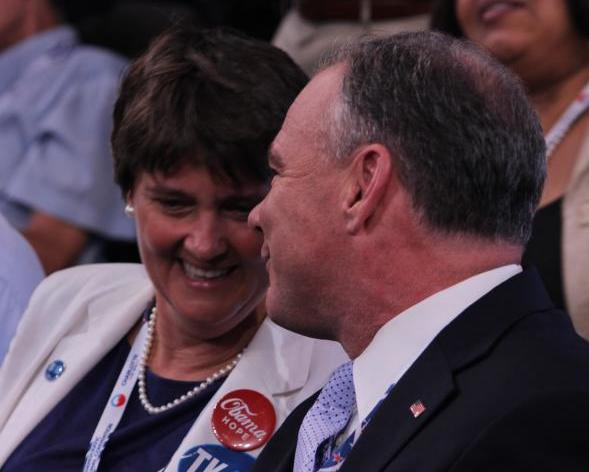
Holton with her husband at the 2012 Democratic National Convention

Holton graduated magna cum laude from Princeton University with a degree from the Woodrow Wilson School of Public and International Affairs in 1980. At Princeton, Holton was a member of Colonial Club.

Holton then attended Harvard Law School, where she met her future husband, Tim Kaine. The future couple met as students in a legal assistance program focusing on prisoners' civil rights. While a law student, Holton also served on the Mental Health Legal Advisors Committee. Both Holton and Kaine earned their law degrees from Harvard in 1983.

They married in November 1984 at a Roman Catholic church in Richmond. Holton decided to keep her maiden name, a decision Kaine supported. They moved to the North Side neighborhood of Richmond, where they have lived ever since. The couple has three children: Nat (b. 1990), Woody (b. 1992), and Annella (b. 1995).

== Career ==
=== Law clerk and legal aid attorney ===
Following graduation from law school, Holton served as a law clerk for Judge Robert R. Merhige Jr. of the Richmond-based United States District Court for the Eastern District of Virginia. From 1985 to 1998, she worked as an attorney for the Central Virginia Legal Aid Society, where she helped create an award-winning volunteer lawyers' program in Richmond.

=== Judge ===
In the mid-1990s, Holton occasionally served as a substitute judge for the Juvenile and Domestic Relations District Court for the City of Richmond. When the court expanded to a fifth permanent judgeship, Holton applied for the post and was appointed. Holton was sworn in as a judge on June 30, 1998, one day before Kaine was sworn in as mayor. Holton served as chief judge of the court from 2000 to 2003.

Holton administered the oath of office at her husband's inauguration as Lieutenant Governor of Virginia in 2002. Holton was not allowed to participate in her husband's campaign for governor in 2005 because of her position as a judge. Holton resigned from the bench in late 2005, following her husband's election as governor.

=== Education Secretary of Virginia ===
After Kaine's term as governor ended, Holton served as director of the Great Expectations program, an initiative that helped foster children attend schools in the Virginia Community College System. In 2014, Virginia governor-elect Terry McAuliffe appointed Holton to be the state's Education Secretary.

As Education Secretary, Holton wrote in 2015 that high-stakes testing in Virginia resulted in "teaching to the test" and made it difficult to attract good teachers to low-income schools. Holton supported increases in teacher pay and changes to the state's high school curriculum. She said she supported increased professional development for teachers. She also indicated her support for McAuliffe's 2016 legislative proposals to change high school graduation requirements and focus on early college courses and industry credentials. Holton resigned as Education Secretary on July 25, 2016, in order to focus on her husband's campaign for vice president.

In February 2017, Governor McAuliffe appointed Holton to the Virginia State Board of Education. As a member of the Board of Education, Holton stated that she was in favor of charter schools along with other forms of education innovation, positing that strong charter school proposals help provide children with a pathway to life success. Holton also stated that Virginia's tradition of charter schools requiring approval by local school boards, as enshrined in the Constitution of Virginia, has served Virginia well, encouraging charter school proposals to make their case to local school boards.

=== Visiting professor at George Mason University ===
In May 2017, George Mason University announced that Holton would join the faculty as a visiting professor at the School of Public Policy and Management and at the College of Education and Human Development, and as a visiting Fellow at the Center for Education Policy and Evaluation.

=== Interim President of George Mason University ===
In June 2019, George Mason University announced that Holton would serve as the interim President of George Mason University beginning August 1, 2019. She remained in that role until Gregory Washington took office on July 1, 2020.

== First Lady of Virginia ==
Following Thomas Jefferson's daughter, Martha Jefferson Randolph, Holton was the second daughter of a Virginia Governor to become First Lady of Virginia. Holton was the only person to live in the Virginia Governor's Mansion as a child and as an adult.

As First Lady, she launched the "For Keeps: Families for all Virginia Teens" initiative in January 2007. The initiative focused on finding stable families willing to take in Virginia children in foster care, especially older or difficult-to-place children. In doing so she said was motivated by an urge to fix some of the problems she had witnessed in the foster care system during her stint as a judge in the juvenile court.

During the 2008 presidential election, her husband was an early endorser of Barack Obama and Holton headed the state's Women for Obama group.

== Role during the 2016 presidential campaign ==
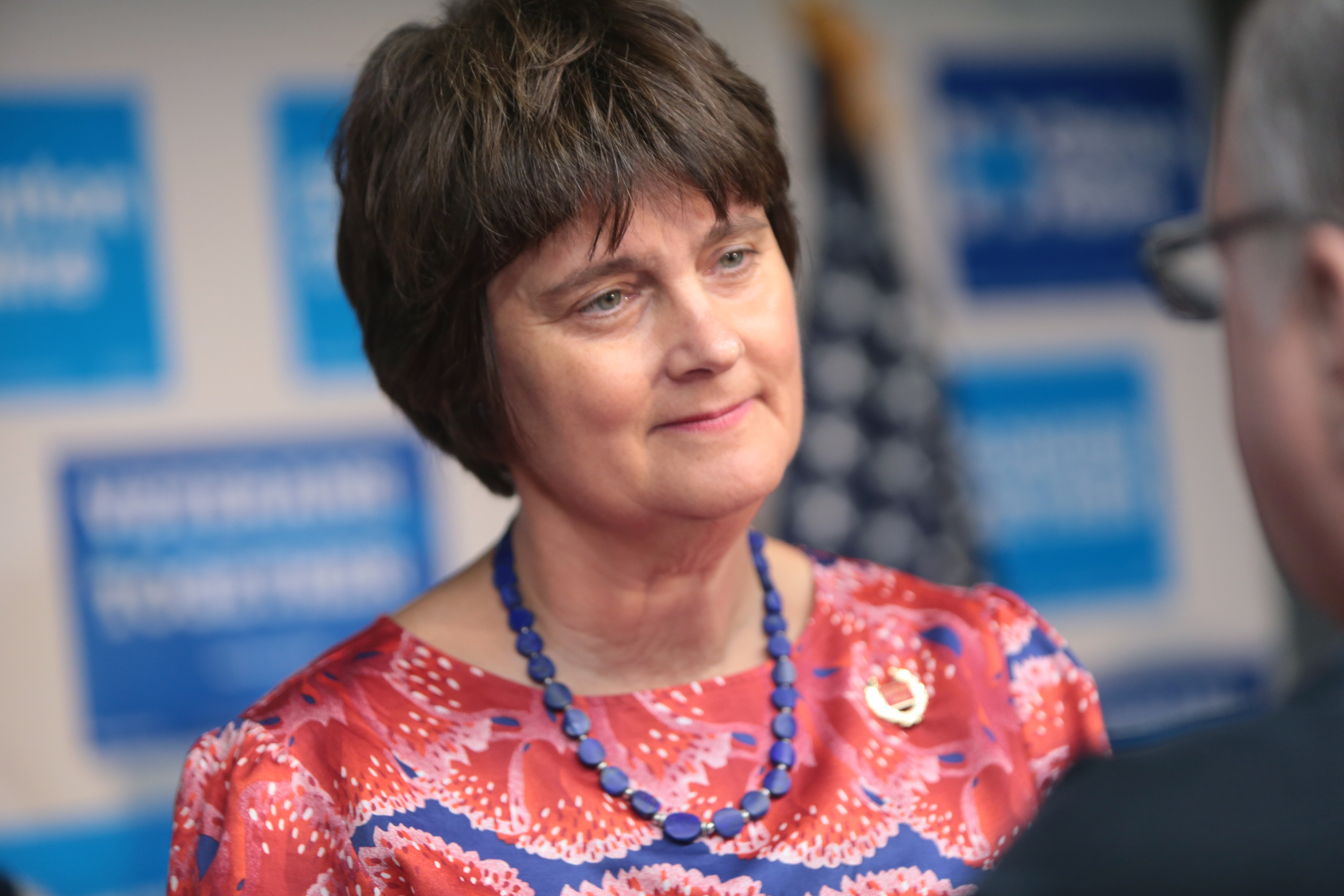
Holton in 2016, campaigning for Hillary Clinton and her husband, Tim Kaine, in Phoenix, Arizona.

In 2016, Democratic Party presidential nominee Hillary Clinton selected Holton's husband Tim Kaine to serve as her running-mate. Following her husband's selection as Clinton's running mate, Holton began traveling the country campaigning for the 2016 Democratic ticket. Immediately after the 2016 Democratic National Convention, Holton joined Clinton and Kaine on a bus trip through Pennsylvania and Ohio. She continued campaigning, sometimes appearing with her husband and sometimes alone, in several states. Holton discussed policy surrounding childcare and initiatives for small businesses when campaigning.

During the campaign, there was speculation that if her husband were to become vice-president, Holton might fill the vacancy that would be left in Kaine's senate seat. Holton denied having any interest in the position, saying, in reference to the Vice President's role as President of the Senate, "I will never let (my) husband be my boss".

== Civic involvements and personal life ==
Holton sits on numerous boards, including Voices of Virginia's Children, the Richmond Public Schools Education Foundation, and the advisory board of Youth-Nex, the University of Virginia Center to Promote Effective Youth Development at the School of Education and Human Development (formerly the Curry School of Education). She has also been active in school PTAs. Holton has received the Metropolitan Richmond Women's Bar Association's Women of Achievement Award (1995), the YWCA of Richmond's Outstanding Woman of the Year in Law award (2006), and the Annie E. Casey Foundation's Life Award of Distinction.

Holton and Kaine are congregants of the St. Elizabeth Catholic Church in Richmond, a mostly African American congregation.

Holton is a longtime clog dancer, taking up the hobby in high school.

Honorary titles
Preceded by Margaret Hager	Second Lady of Virginia; 2002–2006	Succeeded by Jean Bolling
Preceded by Lisa Collis	First Lady of Virginia; 2006–2010	Succeeded by Maureen McDonnell
Political offices
Preceded by Laura Fornash	Virginia Secretary of Education; 2014–2016	Succeeded by Dietra Trent
