= Ben Kaplan =

Ben Kaplan may refer to:

- Ben Kaplan (author) (born 1977), economist and public commentator
- Ben Kaplan (producer), Canadian music producer and recording engineer
- Benjamin Kaplan (1911–2010), American copyright scholar and jurist
- Benjamin J. Kaplan, historian
- Ben Kaplan, a character in the British spy series Spooks
