= Cleveland High School (Portland, Oregon) =

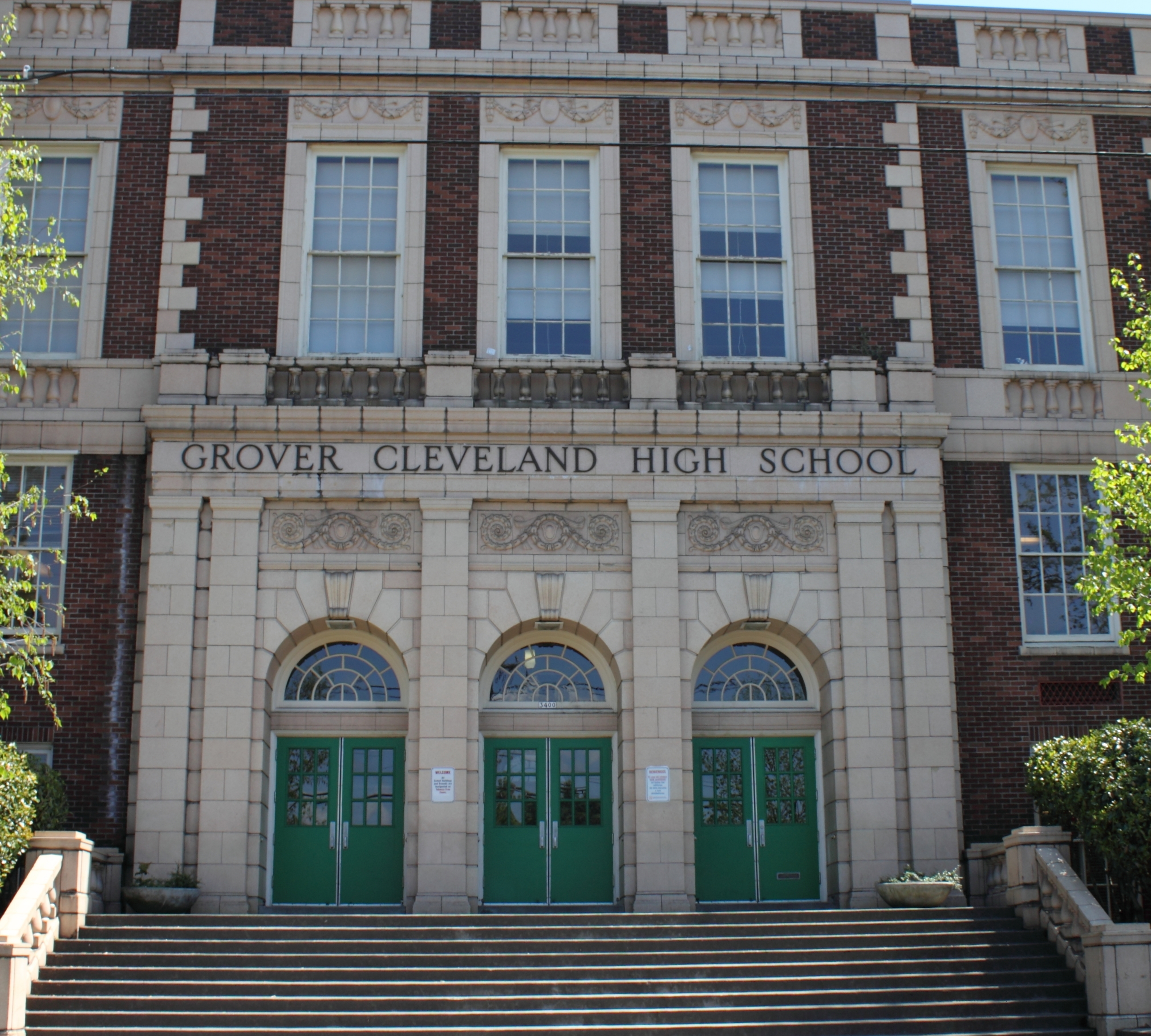

Location
- 3400 SE 26th Avenue; Portland, Oregon 97202; United States; 45.4985°N 122.6385°W

Information
- Type: Public
- Opened: 1916 (as Commercial High School); 1948 (as Cleveland High School)
- School district: Portland Public Schools
- Principal: Jo Ann Wadkins
- Teaching staff: 76.32 (on an FTE basis)
- Grades: 9–12
- Enrollment: 1,472 (2023–2024)
- Student to teacher ratio: 19.29
- Colors: Kelly green and yellow
- Athletics conference: OSAA Portland Interscholastic League 6A-1
- Team name: Warriors
- Rival: Franklin High School
- Newspaper: The Clarion
- Feeder schools: Hosford Middle School; Lane Middle School; Sellwood Middle School
- Website: cleveland.pps.net

Cleveland High School (CHS, formally Grover Cleveland High School) is a public high school in inner southeast Portland, Oregon, United States. It is part of the Portland Public Schools district. Its attendance boundary covers much of the western part of Southeast Portland.

== History ==
Cleveland High School was established in 1916 as Commercial High School, changing its name to the High School of Commerce in 1917. The school was originally located on what is now the Portland State University campus, but moved to its current location in 1929 and expanded its name to Clinton Kelly High School of Commerce. The 1929 building was designed by the architect George Howell Jones. Cleveland's focus during this period was on students pursuing a business education, so it offered courses in bookkeeping, stenography, and other related business subjects. Charlotte Plummer Owen worked at the school prior to World War II.

The High School of Commerce gradually increased its course offerings, and eventually became a comprehensive high school in the fall of 1948. The school's name was changed to Grover Cleveland High School the same year, and a new athletic field house and science laboratories were added to the school. This expansion was funded by a $25 million building levy passed by the Portland school board in 1947 that was aimed at renovating and expanding schools across Portland in response to the post-war baby boom.

In the late 1970s and early 1980s, the school district faced declining enrollment, and targeted Cleveland for closure. The CHS property was made up of two parcels: the school building site and the athletic field, originally the site of the Clinton Kelly home. Clinton Kelly, an early Portland settler and minister, specified that the property was to be used solely for a public school. If the property was used for any other purpose, or put up for sale, the property would revert to the Kelly estate, and to the living heirs of Clinton Kelly. The school district ultimately decided to close Washington-Monroe High School instead, and keep Cleveland open.

During 1990 and 1991 the school auditorium was equipped with a large theater pipe organ. The instrument was removed from Benson High School near the Lloyd Center, enlarged, and installed in the Cleveland Auditorium by the Oregon Chapter of the American Theatre Organ Society (now called the Columbia River Theatre Organ Society), which maintains it and presents events open to the public.

Cleveland joined the International Baccalaureate program in 2000, and is one of two high schools that offer the program in Portland.

In 2005, Cleveland was the setting for the music video for "16 Military Wives" by local indie rock band The Decemberists.

In April 2019, Cleveland was the site of a controversy involving culinary arts students making a cake resembling blackface. This was four days after a small noose was found hanging in one of Cleveland's entry points and six months after swastikas and other antisemitic graffiti was found on Cleveland's walls and even on a flier advertising Cleveland's Jewish Student Union.

Due to the age and layout of the school, Portland Public Schools examined proposals to replace or update it as recently as 2023, when the district's real estate team held talks with Kroger regarding a potential purchase of the Fred Meyer corporate offices abutting Powell Park despite the latter party's lack of interest in a sale.

The district has received criticism for their decision to demolish the entire school in and replace it with a new school. In December 2025, a Change.org petition was begun to gather support for preserving the school and to urge the district to place a hold on demolition.

Work began on the deconstruction of the historic building and construction of a new school in its place in June 2026. The new school is expected to be complete in time for instruction to begin in fall 2029. During construction, Cleveland students will learn at the former site of Marshall High School.

== Student profile ==
In the 2018–2019 school year, Cleveland's student population was 68% European American, 10% Hispanic/Latino, 9% Asian, 3% African American, 1% Native American, 1% Pacific Islander, and 8% mixed race. In 2009–2010, the school was locally known for having "an incredibly vocal, motivated and organized parent community".

In 2008, 85% of the school's seniors received a high school diploma. Of 310 students, 262 graduated, 26 dropped out, nine received a modified diploma, and 13 were still in high school the following year. In 2009, 28% of Cleveland students were transfers into the school.

== Athletics ==
Cleveland competes in the Portland Interscholastic League under 6A classification.

=== State championships ===
- Girls swimming: 1954, 1955, 1956, 1957
- Dance/drill: 1990, 1991, 1996, 1997
- Speech and Debate: 2012, 2013, 2014, 2015, 2016, 2018, 2022, 2023, 2024

== Notable alumni ==
- Hazel Ying Lee, first Chinese-American woman to become a US military pilot
- John Bryson, retired CEO of Edison International; 37th Secretary of Commerce
- Jeffrey Grayson, co-founder of Capital Consultants
- The Hudson Brothers, musical group and television act; recorded hit song "So You Are a Star"; all three brothers, including Bill Hudson (b. 1947), ex-husband of Goldie Hawn and father of Kate and Oliver Hudson
- Phil Knight, co-founder and chairman of Nike, Inc.
- Kathie L. Olsen, former Chief Scientist for NASA and deputy director, neuroscience, of the National Science Foundation
- Dennis Patera, former football player for the San Francisco 49ers
- Ken Patera, professional wrestler
- Jaime St. James, lead singer of Black 'N Blue and former lead singer of Warrant
- Natalie K. Wight, U.S. Attorney for District of Oregon

== Notes and references ==
=== References ===
- Polich, Edward L. (1950). A history of Portland's secondary school system with emphasis on the superintendents and the curriculum (PDF) (M.A.). University of Portland. OCLC 232551057.
