= Jinks Holton =

American public servant

Virginia "Jinks" Holton

First Lady of Virginia
- In role January 17, 1970 – January 12, 1974
- Governor: A. Linwood Holton
- Preceded by: Katherine Godwin
- Succeeded by: Katherine Godwin

Personal details
- Born: Virginia Harrison Rogers; October 21, 1925 Roanoke, Virginia, U.S.
- Died: December 16, 2022 (aged 97) Irvington, Virginia, U.S.
- Spouse: Linwood Holton (m. 1953; died 2021)
- Children: 4, including Anne Holton, Woody Holton, and Dwight Holton
- Education: Wellesley College

Virginia Harrison "Jinks" Rogers Holton (October 21, 1925 – December 16, 2022) was an American public servant who was the First Lady of Virginia from 1970 to 1974. She was a strong supporter of civil rights and integration during her tenure in the role.

== Early life and education ==
Holton was born Virginia Rogers in 1925 in Roanoke, Virginia, the daughter of Frank Waters Rogers and Anne Newton Jett Rogers. Her grandfather Rev. Robert Carter Jett was bishop of the Episcopal Diocese of Southwestern Virginia. In 1942, she graduated from Stuart Hall School, and in 1946 she graduated from Wellesley College with a Bachelor of Arts degree in French.

== Career ==
In the late 1940s, Holton worked for two years in the Central Intelligence Group at the American Embassy in Brussels, Belgium. After returning from Belgium, she worked for two years at the Central Intelligence Agency in Washington, D.C., reporting to James Jesus Angleton.

In November 1969, Governor-elect Holton and First Lady-designate Holton were guests of President Richard Nixon at the White House. In 1970, Holton became the First Lady of Virginia upon the election of her husband to the Governor's office. Holton and her husband made national headlines when, after moving to the Virginia Executive Mansion, they enrolled their children in Richmond Public Schools, which had recently been integrated.

As First Lady, Holton's primary causes included child nutrition and daycare programs, civil rights, and the integration of public schools. She also restored public tours of the Virginia Executive Mansion. In 1974, Holton led the first Virginia Conference on Reading. Holton moved with her family to northern Virginia in 1974, when her husband accepted a job as Richard Nixon's Assistant Secretary of State for Congressional Relations.

After serving as First Lady, Holton was the founder of Northern Neck Court Appointed Special Advocates, a program that assists the court system in juvenile abuse cases. She was also an active volunteer with Habitat for Humanity. Holton also served as a co-founder and board member of Voices for Virginia's Children, and as the president of the Virginia Environmental Endowment.

In 1986, Holton was appointed as a trustee of Washington and Lee University, becoming the first woman to serve on the university's board. She remained on the board until 1995. Holton's other board service included serving as a trustee at the University of Virginia Medical School Foundation, the board of directors of Mount Vernon, the Chesapeake Bay Foundation board, and as a member of the University of Virginia Board of Visitors.

== Personal life ==
In 1953, she married Linwood Holton. They were married for 67 years. They had four children, including Tayloe Loftus, Virginia Secretary of Education and Virginia First Lady Anne Holton, historian Woody Holton, and former U.S. Attorney for the District of Oregon, Dwight Holton.

Holton spoke four other languages, including French, German, Italian, and Russian.

== Death ==
Holton died on December 16, 2022, in Irvington, Virginia at the age of 97. After her death, Holton's son-in-law, Senator Tim Kaine, delivered a tribute speech to her on the United States Senate floor.
