= Dwight Holton =

American lawyer (born 1965)

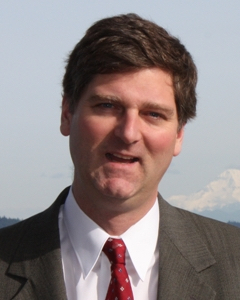
- Portrait of Holton, c. 2010

United States Attorney for the District of Oregon
- In office February 4, 2010 – October 7, 2011
- President: Barack Obama
- Preceded by: Karin Immergut
- Succeeded by: Amanda Marshall

Personal details
- Born: Dwight Carter Holton; December 18, 1965 (age 60) Roanoke, Virginia, U.S.
- Party: Democratic
- Spouse: Mary Ellen Glynn (m. 2000)
- Parents: Linwood Holton; Jinks Rogers Holton
- Education: Brown University (AB); University of Virginia (JD)
- Occupation: Lawyer
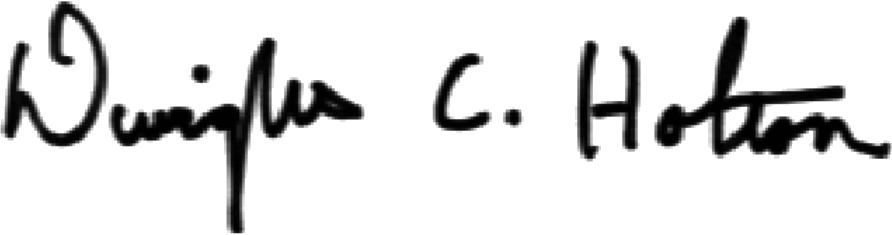
- Signature

Dwight Carter Holton (born December 18, 1965) is an American lawyer and politician from Oregon. Born in Roanoke, Virginia, he was approximately four years old when his father, Linwood Holton, was elected governor, becoming the first Republican in one-hundred years to hold that office. The elder Holton, who ran on a platform of racial reconciliation, famously sent his children to majority-Black public schools in Richmond, following court-ordered integration.

After earning a degree at Brown University and spending a number of years working on Democratic political campaigns, Holton entered the University of Virginia School of Law. Following his graduation, he joined the United States Department of Justice as an Assistant United States Attorney. He spent over a decade prosecuting cases in Brooklyn and, later, Portland, Oregon, before being named interim United States Attorney for the District of Oregon in 2010. After a year-and-a-half in office, he left federal government service to seek the Democratic nomination for Oregon Attorney General in 2012. Despite being an early frontrunner in campaign fundraising, he lost his party's primary to Ellen Rosenblum.

== Early life and family ==
=== Childhood and education ===
Holton was born on December 18, 1965, in Roanoke, Virginia, the fourth and youngest child of Virginia Harrison "Jinks" Holton (née Rogers; 1925–2022) and Abner Linwood Holton Jr. (1923–2021), a prominent local attorney and Republican Party politician. He was named for former President Dwight D. Eisenhower, who had campaigned for his father during his unsuccessful gubernatorial run against Mills Godwin earlier in the year, and Episcopal bishop Robert Carter Jett, his great-grandfather.

In 1969, Holton's father ran for Governor again, this time defeating William C. Battle, former United States Ambassador to Australia and son of former Governor John S. Battle. Shortly after he and his family moved to the state capital, Richmond, U.S. district court judge Robert R. Merhige Jr. decided the case Bradley v. Richmond School Board, ordering a limited busing program to integrate the city's public schools. Holton's parents made national headlines when they sent his older siblings: Tayloe, Anne, and Woody, to majority-Black schools near the Executive Mansion, in a show of public support for the move. Holton started kindergarten at John B. Cary Elementary School the following year, to little fanfare.

Holton moved with his family to northern Virginia in 1974, when his father accepted a job as Richard Nixon's Assistant Secretary of State for Congressional Relations. While in high school, he served as a congressional page. He graduated from Langley High School in 1983, after which he entered Brown University. He received a Bachelor of Arts in U.S. History in 1987.

=== Marriage ===
On September 22, 2000, Holton married Mary Ellen Glynn, a spokesperson for Ambassador Richard Holbrooke and former White House deputy press secretary under Bill Clinton, at Mary, Star of the Sea Catholic Church in La Jolla, California. The couple eventually settled in Southeast Portland, Oregon, in 2002, after Governor-elect Ted Kulongoski appointed Glynn as his communications director. They have two children, a son and a daughter.

== Career ==
=== Democratic campaigns ===
Leaving Brown, Holton worked on Michael Dukakis's 1988 presidential campaign and Doug Wilder's successful 1989 gubernatorial campaign, after which he continued on as an aide to Wilder.

=== Campaign for Attorney General ===
Political offices
Preceded by Karin Immergut	United States Attorney for the District of Oregon; 2010–2011	Succeeded by Amanda Marshall
