= Charlotte Plummer Owen =

American clarinetist and bandleader

Charlotte Louise Plummer Owen (January 13, 1918 – December 18, 2004) was an American clarinetist and bandleader.

Owen was born in Minneapolis into a family which had a dance band, with which she would play weekly while growing up. She studied piano and saxophone, and at Eugene High School in Oregon was an award-winning clarinetist. At the University of Oregon she studied music education, concurrently being hired to direct the band at University High School. She graduated in 1939 and moved to take a position as an assistant band director in La Grande, Oregon, soon she moved again, to lead the instrumental and vocal ensembles at Commerce High School in Portland. In 1943 she enlisted in the Marine Corps Women's Reserve as a band clarinetist; appointed director, at the rank of Master Technical Sergeant, she became the first woman band director in the Marine Corps; she was also the first woman to guest-conduct the United States Marine Corps Band, and remained the only woman so to do until 2003. On September 12, 1945, in Falls Church, Virginia, she married Charles Owen, a percussionist and fellow musician in the Marines, and raised a family while working as an orchestral clarinetist, teaching privately as well for over sixty years. In 1986 she became founder and director of the Ann Arbor Civic Band, remaining in the post until 2001. In 1997 she participated in the dedication of the Women in Military Service for America Memorial by leading a band of women veterans. Owen died in Ann Arbor, Michigan. For her work Owen received the Distinguished Alumni Award from the University of Oregon School of Music and the Woman of the Year Award from the Daughters of the American Revolution. Women Band Directors International offers a scholarship in her name.
