= Woody Holton =

American historian

- Born: Abner Linwood Holton III; May 15, 1959 (age 67)
- Education: University of Virginia (BA); Duke University (PhD)
- Occupation: Historian
- Spouse: Gretchen Schoel
- Children: 2
- Parents: Linwood Holton; Jinks Rogers Holton
- Relatives: Anne Holton (sister); Dwight Holton (brother); Tim Kaine (brother-in-law)

Abner Linwood Holton III (born May 15, 1959), known as Woody Holton, is an American historian who is the McCausland Professor of History at the University of South Carolina.

== Early life and education ==
Abner Linwood Holton III is the son of former Virginia Governor Linwood Holton. His sister, former Virginia First Lady Anne Holton, is the wife of U.S. Senator and former Virginia Governor Tim Kaine, the Democratic Party nominee for vice president in 2016. He earned a B.A. in English at the University of Virginia, where he wrote for The Cavalier Daily, in 1981. He received his Ph.D. in history from Duke University in 1990.

== Career ==
Holton worked for several years on behalf of environmental causes. In 1990, he created Clean Up Congress (CUC), a political action committee described by OpenSecrets.org as "Democrat/liberal" group. In 1994, CUC waged a campaign to defeat Oliver North's bid for Virginia's Senate seat (North lost by 3% of the vote to Chuck Robb).

From 1981 to 1983, he served as a legislative aide in the Virginia General Assembly for Delegate Robert T. Andrews (R-McLean). Characterized in the Washington Post as an energetic "young tiger", he helped Andrews draft and win the enactment of Virginia's first child safety seat law, changes to the Alcohol Safety Action Program (ASAP) for post-conviction referral, and other legislation.

He began teaching at the University of Richmond in 2000 as an assistant professor, rising to professor in 2011. His essay titled "Divide et Impera: The Tenth Federalist in a Wider Sphere" was selected for inclusion in Best American History Essays 2006 by the Organization of American Historians. He published Unruly Americans in 2007. Holton's Abigail Adams was awarded the Bancroft Prize for 2010. The book focuses on the role of creditors and bond speculators in the creation of the US Constitution by examining the financial acumen of one of America's earliest and most aggressive female investors.

In July 2012, Holton became the McCausland Professor of History at the University of South Carolina, though he remained in Richmond for another year on a fellowship from the National Endowment for the Humanities.

== Personal life ==
Holton is married to Gretchen Schoel, a student of the impact of the internet on intercultural communication. They have a daughter, Beverly Holton and a son, Henry Holton.

== Awards ==
- 2000 Merle Curti Award from the Organization of American Historians for Forced Founders
- 2007 National Book Award finalist for Unruly Americans and the Origins of the Constitution
- 2008 Guggenheim Fellowship
- 2010 Bancroft Prize for Abigail Adams

== Writings ==
- —— (1999). Forced Founders: Indians, Debtors, Slaves and the Making of the American Revolution in Virginia (paperback 1st ed.). Chapel Hill: University of North Carolina Press. ISBN 9780807847848.
- —— (2007). Unruly Americans and the Origins of the Constitution (hardcover 1st ed.). New York: Macmillan. ISBN 9780809080618.
- —— (2009). Abigail Adams (hardcover 1st ed.). New York: Simon and Schuster. ISBN 9781416546801.
- —— (2009). Black Americans in the Revolutionary Era: A Brief History with Documents (paperback 1st ed.). Boston: Bedford/St. Martin's. ISBN 9780312413590.
- —— (2021). Liberty Is Sweet: The Hidden History of the American Revolution (hardcover 1st ed.). New York: Simon & Schuster. ISBN 9781476750378.
