= South Eugene High School =

Public school in Oregon, United States

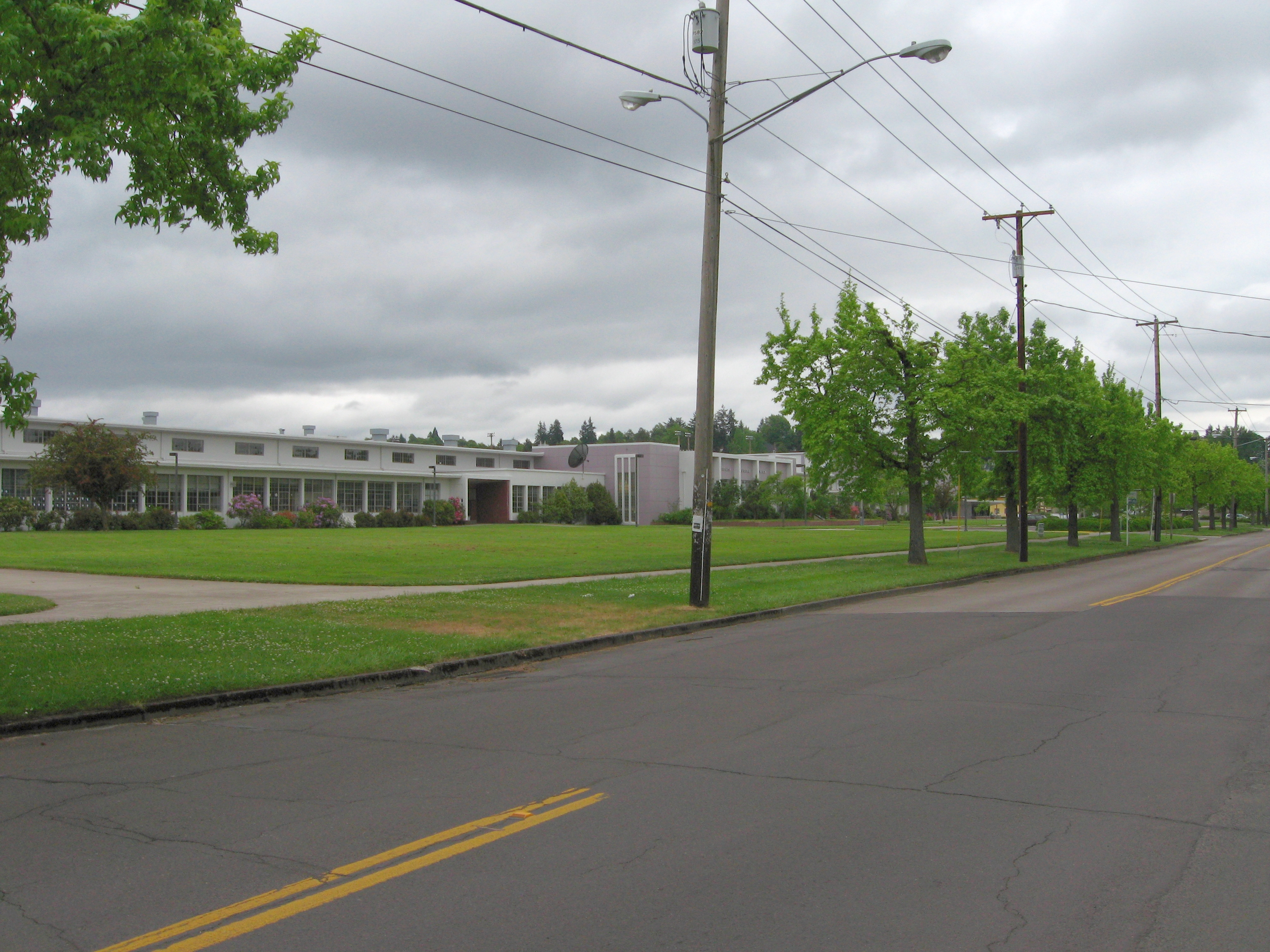

Location
- 400 East 19th Ave. Eugene, (Lane County), Oregon 97401; United States; 44.0388°N 123.087°W

Information
- Type: Public
- Established: 1903
- Status: Open
- School district: Eugene School District
- Principal: Kee Zublin
- Teaching staff: 66.51 (FTE)
- Grades: 9-12
- Enrollment: 1,499 (2024-2025)
- Student to teacher ratio: 22.54
- Colors: Purple and white
- Mascot: The Axe
- Newspaper: The Axe
- Website: www.sehs.lane.edu

South Eugene High School is a public high school located in Eugene, Oregon, United States. Its Latin motto, Futura in praesenti iacent, means "The future lies in the present".

== History ==
The school was founded as Eugene High School in 1903, and was located at Willamette Street and West 11th Avenue in a brick building that later served as Eugene's city hall. The Eugene school district in 1915 built a new high school on a one-block site on West 17th Avenue between Lincoln and Charnelton Streets.

By 1943, the Eugene School District had outgrown the cramped old high school, and voters approved a bond measure to build a new facility. World War II and other factors delayed construction for a decade, but the current building at 400 E. 19th Avenue was completed and occupied in September 1953. The old high school then served as Woodrow Wilson Junior High School until 1967 (the previous Wilson building was converted to Lincoln Elementary School in 1953).

In the fall of 1957, Eugene High was renamed South Eugene High School, when North Eugene High School opened in the River Road area north of the city.

In April 2018, after more than 90 years as the Axemen, the name of the school mascot was officially changed to The Axe.

== Academics ==
In 1983, South Eugene High School was honored in the Blue Ribbon Schools Program, the highest honor a school can receive in the United States.

In 2008, 89% of the school's seniors received a high school diploma. Of 410 students, 363 graduated, 40 dropped out, and seven were still in high school the following year.

The school has regularly received a silver ranking in U.S. News & World Report's "America's Best High Schools" survey.

In 2010, a student at the school was honored as a Presidential Scholar, one of three from Oregon. A student at the school won the Intel Science Talent Search in 2009 after another South Eugene student placed third in 2007; other students have been named finalists or semifinalists in recent years.

South Eugene High School hosts a branch of the Eugene International High School, which offers International Baccalaureate courses as well as the International Baccalaureate Diploma. The main campus of South Eugene High School offers numerous Advanced Placement courses as well as honors courses.

South Eugene High School offers 14 Advanced Placement (AP) classes and opportunities for college credit through Lane Community College and the University of Oregon.

== Activities ==
The school has many athletic teams (men's and women's ultimate frisbee, volleyball, football, lacrosse, cheerleading, men's and women's soccer, men's and women's basketball, wrestling, men's and women's golf, men's and women's tennis, men’s and women’s swimming, softball, baseball, cross country and track and field) and other student activities, such as band, choir, theater, orchestra and visual arts, as well as various student clubs.

South Eugene competes in the 6A Southwest Conference, except for football, which competes in the 5A Midwestern Conference. The school has experienced difficulty fielding a football team in the past due to a lack of participants.

South Eugene High School also offers a wide variety of clubs and programs. These include Speech and Debate, Alpine and Nordic Ski teams, National Honor Society, Rowing Club, Red Cross Club, Rotary Interact, Black Student Union, Feminist Union, Jewish Student Union, Latino Student Union, Model United Nations, Gender & Sexuality Alliance, and Mock Trial. The South Eugene Robotics Team (FIRST Robotics Competition Team 2521) also meets at South Eugene High School, but is unaffiliated with the school itself.

=== State championships ===
- Baseball: 1961, 1962
- Boys basketball: 1927, 1946, 1955
- Boys soccer: 1998, 2002
- Boys track and field: 1971, 1972, 1973, 1974, 1976, 1977, 1979, 1980, 1981, 1982, 1983
- Football: 1936
- Girls basketball: 1987, 1999
- Girls track and field: 1975, 2019
- Gender diverse ultimate frisbee: 2024, 2023, 2022

== Notable alumni ==
- Sam Adams (Class of 1982), former mayor of Portland, Oregon
- Cecil Andrus (Class of 1948), Governor of Idaho (1971–1977, 1987–1995) and U.S. Secretary of the Interior (1977–1981)
- Garner Ted Armstrong (Class of 1947), televangelist for the Worldwide Church of God
- Phil Barnhart (Class of 1964), Oregon state representative
- John Beckett (Class of 1912), member of the College Football Hall of Fame
- Bryce Boettcher (Class of 2021), college football linebacker and professional baseball outfielder
- Tracy Bonham (Class of 1984), musician
- Richard Brautigan (Class of 1953), counterculture author and poet
- Liya Brooks (Class of 2023), college soccer player
- Chris Carter (Class of 1991), record producer
- Phoebe Cole Gordon, artist
- E. Max Frye (Class of 1973), screenwriter and director
- Neil Goldschmidt (Class of 1958), mayor of Portland (1973–1979), Governor of Oregon (1987–1991), and United States Secretary of Transportation (1979–1981)
- Tim Hardin (Class of 1960), anti-war folk singer
- Rick Hawn (Class of 1994), mixed martial arts fighter
- The Hunches (Class of 1999), rock band
- Jonh Ingham (Class of 1968), pop music journalist
- Nate Jaqua (Class of 2000), MLS soccer player
- Gerald R. Johnson (Class of 1938), United States Army Air Forces pilot and the fourth ranking USAAF flying ace in the Pacific during World War II
- Ben Kaplan (Class of 1995), author
- Mat Kearney (Class of 1997), singer and songwriter
- John Kitzhaber (Class of 1965), Governor of Oregon (1995–2003, 2011–2015)
- Mike Lafferty (Class of 1966), World Cup alpine ski racer, 1972 Olympian
- Dustin Lanker (Class of 1993), keyboardist for the Cherry Poppin' Daddies and the Mad Caddies
- Boseko Lokombo, professional football player
- Bill McChesney (Class of 1977), 1980 Olympian in track and field
- Miguel McKelvey (Class of 1992), co-founder of WeWork
- Jason Moss (Class of 1986), guitarist for the Cherry Poppin' Daddies
- Charlotte Plummer Owen, bandleader and clarinetist
- Abraham Palmer, (Class of 1988), behavior geneticist
- Julie Payne (Class of 1964), actress
- Edwin J. Peterson (Class of 1947), Oregon Supreme Court Chief Justice
- Paul Pierson (Class of 1977), political scientist, author
- Rock n Roll Soldiers (Class of 2001), rock band
- Brian Rowe (Class of 2006), MLS goalkeeper
- Heidi Schellman (Class of 1975), physicist, head of Department of Physics at Oregon State University
- Dan Siegel (Class of 1972), pianist, composer and record producer
- Paul Simon(Class of 1945), United States senator
- Holly Goldberg Sloan (Class of 1976), film director, screenwriter, novelist
- Blake Stepp (Class of 2000), professional basketball player
- Corin Tucker (Class of 1990), lead singer of Sleater-Kinney
- Theresa Wayman (Class of 1998), Calvin Klein model, movie actress, keyboardist and singer for Warpaint
- Abraham Wickelgren (Class of 1987), law and economics professor, University of Texas at Austin
- Michelle Zauner (Class of 2007), musician and author
