= Amanda Marshall (attorney) =

American attorney

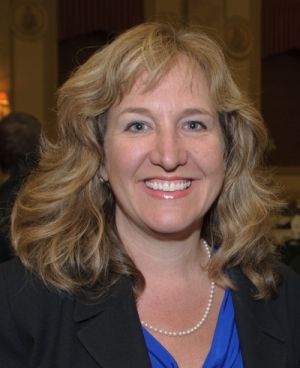

United States Attorney for the District of Oregon
- In office October 7, 2011 – May 15, 2015
- Nominated by: Barack Obama
- Preceded by: Dwight Holton
- Succeeded by: Billy J. Williams

Personal details
- Spouse: Ladd Wiles
- Education: University of Oregon; Willamette University College of Law

Sally Amanda Marshall is an American lawyer in the U.S. state of Oregon. She was, most immediately, the United States Attorney for the United States District Court for the District of Oregon, the top federal prosecutor position in the state. She resigned her position on April 24, 2015, amid an internal review, citing unspecified health issues.

== Early and personal life ==
Sally Amanda Marshall was born to William Gray Marshall and Patricia Faye Marshall about 1970. Her parents separated when she was five years old when they were living in Puerto Rico. Growing up, Marshall lived in Washington, D.C., the Chicago area, and finally Mill Valley, California, where she graduated from Tamalpais High School in 1987.

Marshall earned a bachelor's degree in 1992 in rhetoric and communication from the University of Oregon. In 1995, she graduated with a Juris Doctor from Willamette University College of Law in Salem, Oregon. She clerked for the tribal court of the Confederated Tribes of the Grand Ronde Community while still in law school.

She married Yamhill County Circuit Court Judge Ladd Wiles in 1999, whom she met in college. The couple live in McMinnville, Oregon, which is in Yamhill County, and have three sons.

== Legal career ==
Following law school, she was a deputy district attorney for five years in Coos County, Oregon, along the Oregon Coast. Marshall then worked as an assistant attorney general at the Oregon Department of Justice. She spent about 10 years there, primarily in child advocacy. In November 2010, President Barack Obama nominated her to serve as the United States Attorney for the District of Oregon to permanently replace Karin Immergut. Dwight C. Holton had served as the interim U.S. Attorney after Immergut left the position in 2009. The United States Senate confirmed Marshall's appointment in September 2011, and she was sworn in on October 7, 2011.

=== Misconduct investigation and resignation ===
In March 2015, Marshall announced she was taking a leave of absence for health-related reasons. A subsequent inquiry by Willamette Week found she had been suspended by the United States Department of Justice (DOJ) pending investigation she had been in a romantic relationship with a co-worker. Media reports in The Oregonian and Willamette Week claimed that Marshall had been sending numerous text messages and emails to a federal prosecutor under police protection due to threats against his life from the Mexican Mafia. The reports also incorrectly alleged Marshall had been following the prosecutor and his bodyguards outside of working hours. The U.S. Department of Justice later released the full report from the investigation indicated that news reports from Willamette Week were misleading and that Marshall had had an affair with a subordinate in an on again off again nature for over a year. According to Willamette Week, the incidents had been an open secret in Portland, Oregon, for some time; its discovery by DOJ officials in Washington, D.C., prompted the suspension of Marshall and revocation of her security clearance. The following month, Marshall resigned citing unspecified health issues. According to Marshall, she had been receiving treatment for her unspecified health issues but "it was not sufficient."

=== Suspension by Oregon Bar Association ===
In March 2018 the Oregon Bar Association and former U.S. Attorney Amanda Marshall reached an agreement in which her law license was suspended for 90 days followed by 2 years of probation for lying to investigators during the investigation of the misconduct charges against her. During her probation Marshall agreed to see a mental health care professional.

Political offices
Preceded by Dwight Holton	United States Attorney for the District of Oregon; 2011–2015	Succeeded by Billy J. Williams
