= Gregory Washington =

American academic

8th President of George Mason University
- Incumbent
- Assumed office July 1, 2020
- Preceded by: Anne Holton (acting)

Dean of Engineering at the University of California, Irvine
- In office August 1, 2011 – July 1, 2020
- Preceded by: Dimitri Papamoschou (acting)
- Succeeded by: Magnus Egerstedt

Personal details
- Education: North Carolina State University (BS, MS, PhD)
- Scientific career
- Fields: Mechanical engineering
- Institutions: Ohio State University; University of California, Irvine; George Mason University
- Thesis: Modal control of reflector surfaces for far-field power maximization (1994)
- Doctoral advisor: Lawrence Michael

Gregory Nathaniel Washington is an American mechanical engineer currently serving as the 8th president of George Mason University in Northern Virginia since July 2020. He previously served as dean of engineering at the University of California, Irvine from August 2011 to July 2020.

Washington's field of research is on dynamical systems, smart materials, and related devices.

== Early life and education ==
Washington was born in New York City. He attended William G. Enloe High School in Raleigh, North Carolina, graduating in 1984.

Washington studied mechanical engineering at North Carolina State University, where he received a bachelor's degree in 1989 and a doctorate in 1994. His doctoral dissertation was titled Modal control of reflector surfaces for far-field power maximization (1994). He was the first person in his family to obtain a college degree.

== Career ==
In 1995, Washington joined Ohio State University as an assistant professor of mechanical engineering. He was promoted to associate professor in 2000 and professor in 2004. At Ohio State University, he led the Institute for Sustainable Energy and the Environment, He assumed the role of associate dean for research in the college of engineering in 2005, and in 2008, was promoted to interim dean of the college of engineering. He has been involved with the design of lightweight, structurally active antenna, self-driving vehicles and smart materials that can provide vibrational control.

=== UC Irvine ===
In 2011, Washington was appointed dean of engineering at the Henry Samueli School of Engineering at the University of California, Irvine (UCI). He was the first African-American to be made of dean of any engineering school in the University of California system. In his capacity as dean, Washington has expanded the engineering school and created research opportunities with the Middle East and China. He designed an engineering induction program that introduced freshmen to product design.

In 2015, he chaired the UCI Task Force on Ensuring Positive Campus Climate for the African American community. The task force was established after the UCI Black Students Union sent a letter outlining the "structural deficiencies in institutional support for Black students on this campus". The task force looked to establish a Black Resource Center, similar to the one at the University of California, San Diego, which looks to help with the recruitment and retention of students who identify as part of the Black African diaspora. The center has since become the Center for Black Cultures, Resources & Research. Washington secured a $9.5 million grant to engage students from more diverse backgrounds through science and engineering outreach. He was awarded a second term in 2016.

=== George Mason University ===
On February 24, 2020, Washington was announced as the 8th president of George Mason University in Fairfax, Virginia. Effective July 1 of that year, at the height of the global COVID-19 pandemic, Washington became the university's first African-American president. He led the university during the pandemic and launched the university-wide task force on anti-racism and inclusive excellence to identify and correct inequities in university policies and practices.

In August 2025, the United States Department of Education under the second Trump administration found that Gregory Washington had unlawfully discriminated during hiring practices in the name of "diversity, equity and inclusion" when serving as president of George Mason University.

== Board membership ==
Washington serves on the Air Force Research Laboratory and National Science Foundation Directorate for Engineering Advisory Committees.
