= Dietra Trent =

American politician (born 1963)

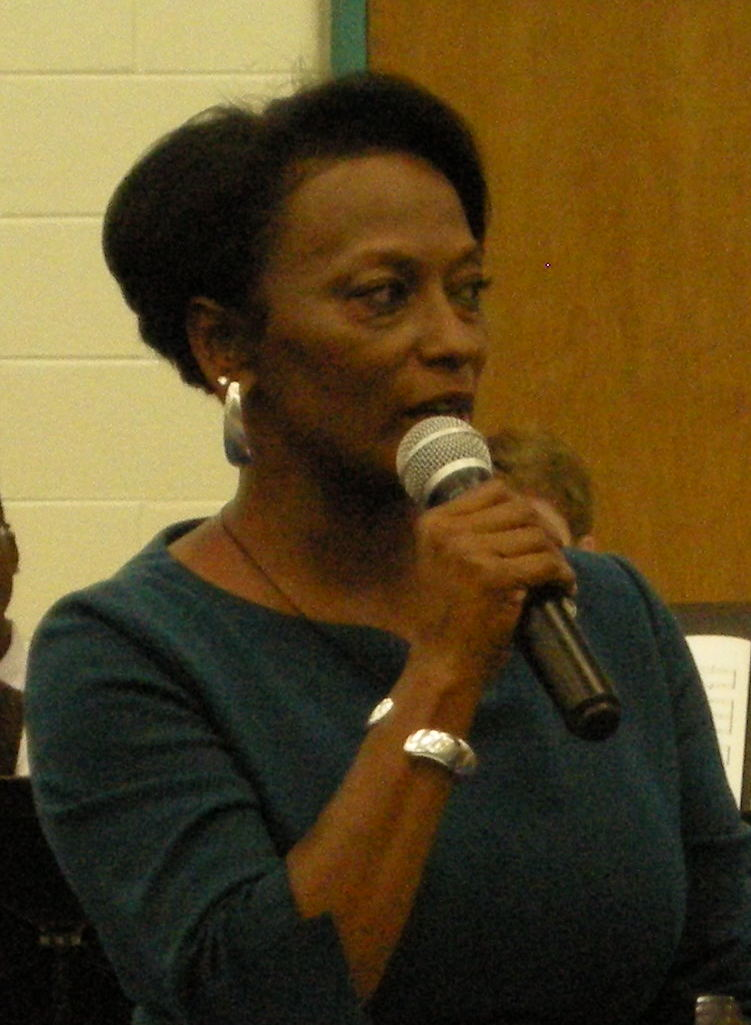
- Trent in 2017

18th Virginia Secretary of Education
- In office July 26, 2016 – January 13, 2018
- Governor: Terry McAuliffe
- Preceded by: Anne Holton
- Succeeded by: Atif Qarni

Personal details
- Born: Dietra Yvette Trent; December 17, 1963 (age 62) Halifax County, Virginia, U.S.
- Party: Democratic
- Education: Hampton University (BS); Virginia Commonwealth; University (MPA, PhD)
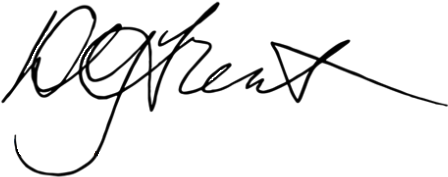
- Signature

Dietra Yvette Trent (born December 17, 1963) served as the Virginia Secretary of Education under Governor Terry McAuliffe. She previously served as Deputy Secretary of Education from 2006 to 2010 and again from 2014 to 2016 and was elevated after Anne Holton's resignation as Secretary to campaign for her husband, Tim Kaine's vice presidential bid in 2016.

Political offices
Preceded by Anne Holton	Virginia Secretary of Education; 2016–present	Succeeded by Incumbent
