= Gerald R. Johnson =

American World War II flying ace

Gerald Richard Johnson
- Born: June 23, 1920; Kenmore, Ohio, U.S.
- Died: October 7, 1945 (aged 25)
- Military career
- Allegiance: United States
- Branch: United States Army Air Corps; United States Army Air Forces
- Service years: 1941–1945
- Rank: Colonel
- Nickname: "Jerry"
- Units: 54th Pursuit Group; 329th Fighter Group; 49th Fighter Group
- Commands: 9th Fighter Squadron; 49th Fighter Group; Atsugi Air Base
- Conflicts: World War II
- Awards: Distinguished Service Cross (2); Silver Star; Legion of Merit; Distinguished Flying Cross (6); Soldier's Medal; Air Medal (12)

Gerald Richard Johnson (June 23, 1920 – October 7, 1945) was a World War II flying ace who flew for the United States Army Air Forces. Johnson commanded the 9th Fighter Squadron and 49th Fighter Group, and became the fourth ranking fighter ace in the Pacific during World War II. He ended his war career with 22 kills.

== Early life ==
Johnson was born in Kenmore, Ohio on June 23, 1920, one of five children born to parents Harold Victor Johnson, Sr. and Hazel Irene Johnson. He was a twin to Harold Victor Johnson, Jr. born on the same day. In 1936, the family moved to Eugene, Oregon. Johnson graduated from Eugene High School in 1938. After graduation, he worked as an attendant with the Department of Agriculture in the summer of 1940. He earned the rank of Eagle Scout in the Boy Scouts of America.

Johnson was married to Barbara Hall on June 1, 1944.

== Military career ==
In 1941, he joined the U.S. Army Aviation Cadet Program at Luke Field. He received his pilot wings in the fall of 1941 and was commissioned a second lieutenant.

=== World War II ===
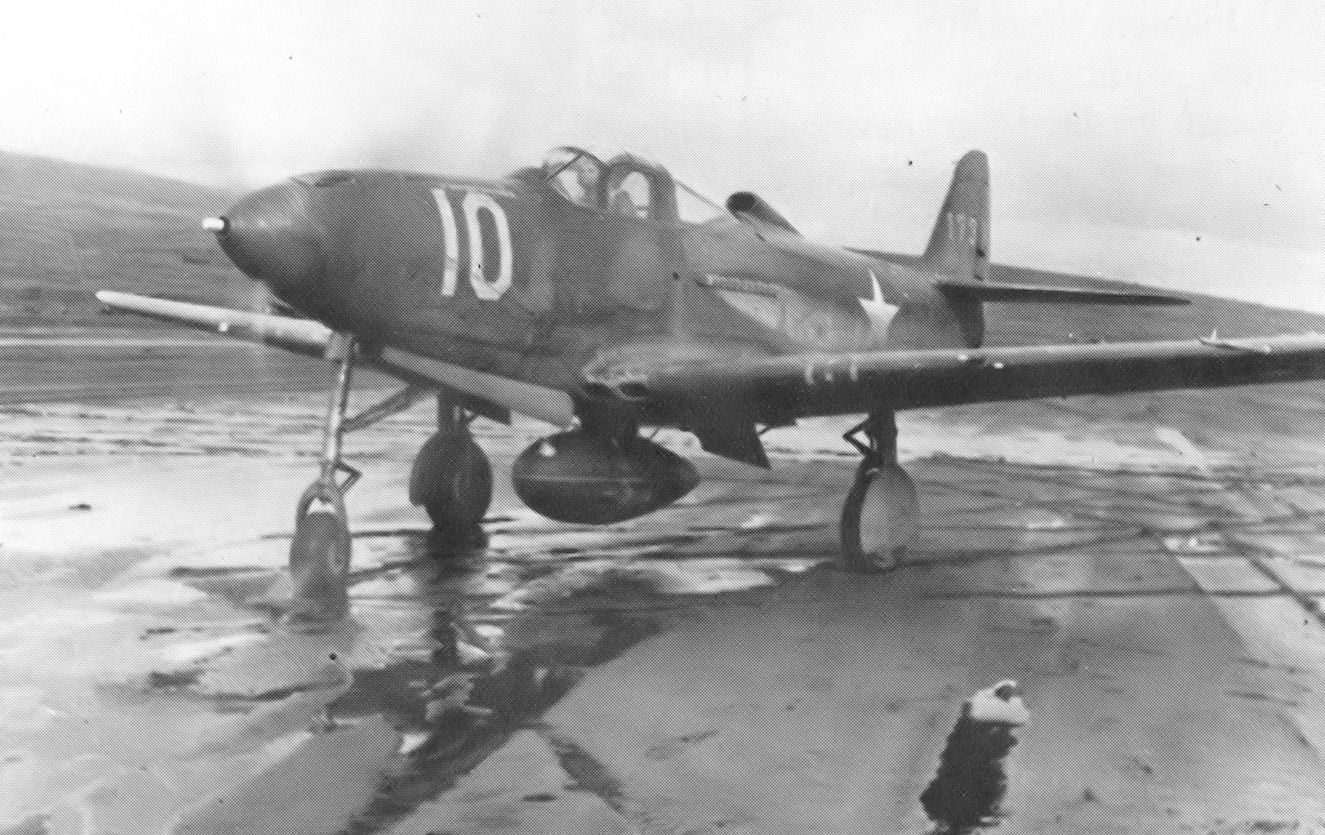
P-39 of 54th FG at Adak, Alaska

Johnson was then assigned to the 57th Pursuit Squadron of the 54th Pursuit Group at Everett, Washington, from November 1941 to February 1943 and went with the group to Alaska from June to October 1942, where he flew the Bell P-39 Airacobra and Curtiss P-40 Warhawk. During the Aleutian Campaign, on 58 combat missions he scored probable two enemy aircraft kills while flying the P-39.

Johnson served with the 332d Fighter Squadron of the 329th Fighter Group at Ontario Army Air Field, California, from February to April 1943. He then moved to Australia and was assigned to the 49th Fighter Group of the Fifth Air Force, flying the Lockheed P-38 Lightnings. Johnson was assigned his P-38, which he named "Barbara" after his future wife. He scored his first confirmed aerial victories on July 23, when he shot down a Nakajima Ki-43 "Oscar" and a Kawasaki Ki-61 "Tony", over Markham Valley, New Guinea.

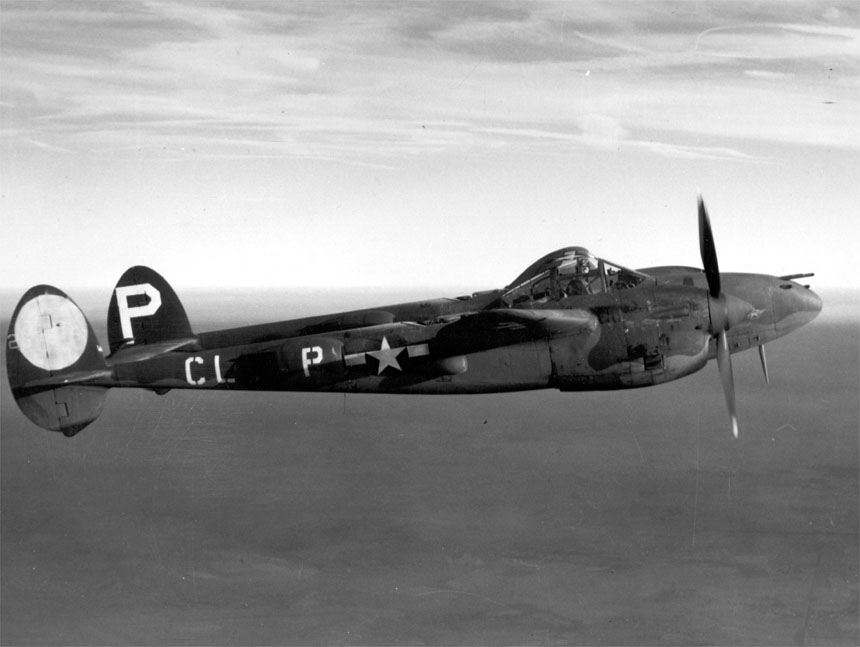
P-38 Lightning

On October 15, 1943, while defending the allied shipping at Oro Bay, he and other aircraft from the 348th Fighter Group intercepted twenty Japanese aircraft. As they maneuvered into position, one of the aircraft in Johnson's formation could not drop its auxiliary fuel tanks, while another blew a supercharger. Unable to fight effectively, these aircraft were escorted back home, leaving Johnson and a few other aircraft alone. During the dogfight, Johnson chased an enemy aircraft off his wingman's tail and destroyed it. Johnson's aircraft was then attacked by the enemy. His heavy fire tore the wing off a Japanese fighter and sent it spiraling, in the process ripping off Johnson's port (left) tail boom assembly. Johnson managed to regain control of his aircraft and was escorted back to base by the remaining friendly planes. Johnson shot down an Oscar and two Aichi D3A "Vals", on that day and successfully managed to disperse the enemy formation and divert it from the target, making him a flying ace but at the cost of his own aircraft. For his heroic actions, he received his first Distinguished Service Cross.

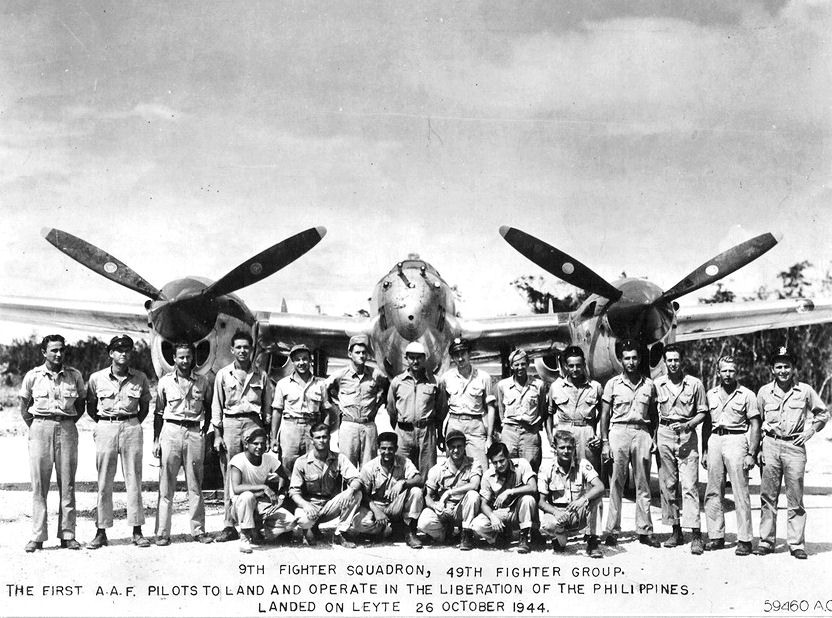
Pilots of the 9th Fighter Squadron posing in front of a P-38 Lightning commemorating the first USAAF pilots to land and operate in the Philippines, October 1944

While providing an escort for B-17 Flying Fortresses bombers, Johnson scored another kill when a Japanese aircraft, concentrating on the bombers, flew straight into his line of fire. Opening fire, he quickly swooped behind another enemy aircraft and sent it down in a ball of flames. In October, Johnson was promoted to the rank of major and served as commander of the 9th FS from October 1943 to January 1944. On November 15, 1943 while flying a P-38, Johnson attacked a formation of two Royal Australian Air Force CAC Boomerangs and two Curtiss P-40 Warhawks who were returning to base. He shot down Boomerang serial number A46-136 piloted by Flying Officer Robert McColl Stewart, who survived the subsequent crash and fire. Later, an Australian flag indicating this Boomerang was painted on Johnson's P-38 Lightning. In late 1943, the 9th Fighter Squadron received the Republic P-47 Thunderbolt, due to the losses suffered by the squadron in the aerial battles over Rabaul and Lockheed being unable to quickly ship replacement P-38s. Johnson shot down a Tony and an A6M Zero, while flying the P-47. He scored a total of 11 aerial victories before going back to the US for a three month shore leave.

Returning to the Pacific in October 1944, he was one of the first USAAF fighter pilots to arrive at Tacloban on Leyte in the Philippines, as P-38s from the 49th FG touched down on the freshly carved airstrip. The strip was under attack night and day as the Japanese tried to destroy the American foothold on Leyte. Four hours later, Johnson shot down two enemy planes, over Balikpapan, in Borneo. 13 days later, he shot down two more enemy planes, on the lead up to the Philippines campaign. During the spring of 1945, the 49th Fighter Group occupied Clark Field and were concentrating on providing ground support roles. They were particularly effective in delivering napalm bombs which devastated enemy installations and made an invasion of the Luzon unnecessary.

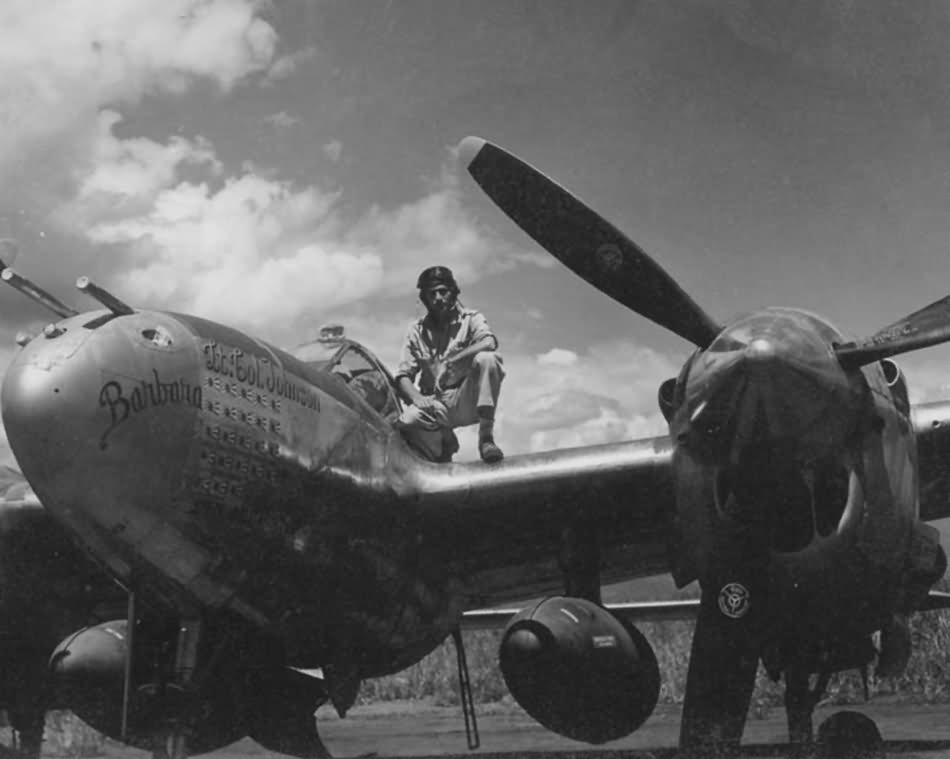
Johnson with his P-38

On November 11, he downed two more Zeros over Ormoc Bay, and on December 7, the third anniversary of the attack on Pearl Harbor, he shot down three Oscars and one Nakajima Ki-49 "Helen" bomber over Cebu, for which he received his second Distinguished Service Cross. These victories brought him to a total of 21 aerial victories, a quadruple ace, and he was promoted to the rank of lieutenant colonel. He became deputy commander of the 49th Fighter Group until March 1945. Johnson served as 49th FG commander from March to July 1945, and became one of the youngest colonels in the USAAF. He scored his last aerial victory on April 2, when he shot down a Nakajima Ki-44 "Tojo", during a fighter sweep over Hong Kong. During World War II, Johnson flew a total of 265 combat missions. He was credited with the destruction of 22 enemy aircraft in aerial combat plus 2 probables and 1 damaged, which includes 20 in P-38 Lightning and 2 in P-47 Thunderbolt.

== Death and legacy ==
A few weeks after World War II ended, Johnson was assigned as commander of Atsugi Air Base, Japan.

On 7 October 1945, Johnson was flying a B-25 Mitchell from Ie Shima Airfield to Atsugi AB, when it flew into a typhoon and was hopelessly lost in the black skies. He ordered everyone to bail out, but one person neglected to bring a parachute. Johnson gave up his parachute to allow the other crew members to bail out of the aircraft, while he and the co-pilot 2nd Lt. James B. Noland attempted to guide the aircraft back to the airfield. Both men were killed when the B-25 crashed on approach to Irumagawa Airfield. The four crew members who bailed out were successfully rescued. Johnson posthumously received the Soldier's Medal for his heroism. His remains have never been located and he is listed on the Tablets of the Missing at the Honolulu Memorial, in the National Memorial Cemetery of the Pacific in Hawaii. Lt. General George C. Kenney, commander of the Fifth Air Force during World War II, told Johnson's father, "You are the father of the bravest man I ever knew and the bravest thing he ever did was the last thing, when he did not need to be brave."

The Irumagawa Airfield, which is located in the city of Sayama, north of western Tokyo, Japan, was renamed Johnson Air Base, in honor of him.

== Awards and decorations ==
His awards and decorations include:

USAAF Pilot Badge
| Distinguished Service Cross w/ 1 bronze oak leaf cluster | Silver Star | Legion of Merit |
| Distinguished Flying Cross w/ 1 silver oak leaf cluster | Soldier's Medal | Air Medal w/ 2 silver and 1 bronze oak leaf clusters |
| American Defense Service Medal | American Campaign Medal | Asiatic-Pacific Campaign Medal w/ 1 silver and 4 bronze campaign stars |
| World War II Victory Medal | Army of Occupation Medal w/ 'Japan' clasp | Philippine Liberation Medal w/ 2 service stars |

| Army Presidential Unit Citation w/ 3 bronze oak leaf clusters | Philippine Republic Presidential Unit Citation |

=== Distinguished Service Cross citation (1st Award) ===

Johnson, Gerald R.
Major (Air Corps), U.S. Army Air Forces
9th Fighter Squadron, 49th Fighter Group, 5th Air Force
Date of Action: October 15, 1943

Citation:

The President of the United States of America, authorized by Act of Congress July 9, 1918, takes pleasure in presenting the Distinguished Service Cross to Major (Air Corps) Gerald Richard Johnson, United States Army Air Forces, for extraordinary heroism in connection with military operations against an armed enemy while serving as Pilot of a P-38 Fighter Airplane in the 9th Fighter Squadron, 49th Fighter Group, Fifth Air Force, in aerial combat against enemy forces on 15 October 1943, during an air mission in the Southwest Pacific Area. When a large enemy force of 18 dive bombers accompanied by 20 fighters approached the area to attack shipping at Oro Bay, Major Johnson courageously led his squadron of eight airplanes to intercept the enemy flight. Against these overwhelming odds, he unhesitatingly attacked. During the fierce engagement which followed, Major Johnson shot down two enemy bombers and one enemy fighter. By this daring strike, he dispersed the enemy formation and diverted it from the target. Supporting squadrons of allied fighters then entered the combat and turned back the enemy force with no damage to our shipping or installations. In addition to destroying three enemy aircraft on this occasion, Major Johnson, by his heroism, diverted the enemy attack and saved much valuable cargo. Major Johnson's unquestionable valor in aerial combat is in keeping with the highest traditions of the military service and reflects great credit upon himself, the 5th Air Force, and the United States Army Air Forces.

=== Distinguished Service Cross citation (2nd Award) ===

Johnson, Gerald R.
Lieutenant Colonel (Air Corps), U.S. Army Air Forces
9th Fighter Squadron, 49th Fighter Group, 5th Air Force
Date of Action: December 7, 1944

Citation:

The President of the United States of America, authorized by Act of Congress July 9, 1918, takes pleasure in presenting a Bronze Oak Leaf Cluster in lieu of a Second Award of the Distinguished Service Cross to Lieutenant Colonel (Air Corps) Gerald Richard Johnson, United States Army Air Forces, for extraordinary heroism in connection with military operations against an armed enemy while serving as Pilot of a P-38 Fighter Airplane in the 9th Fighter Squadron, 49th Fighter Group, Fifth Air Force, in aerial combat against enemy forces on 7 December 1944, during an air mission in the Southwest Pacific Area. On this date Major Johnson shot down four enemy aircraft in a single engagement. Major Johnson's unquestionable valor in aerial combat is in keeping with the highest traditions of the military service and reflects great credit upon himself, the 5th Air Force, and the United States Army Air Forces.

== Aerial victory credits ==
Chronicle of aerial victories
| Date | # | Type | Location | Aircraft flown | Unit Assigned |
|---|---|---|---|---|---|
| July 26, 1943 | 1; 1 | Nakajima Ki-43; Kawasaki Ki-61 | Markham Valley, New Guinea | P-38 Lightning | 9 FS, 49 FG |
| September 2, 1943 | 1 | unknown twin-engine fighter (possibly Kawasaki Ki-45) | Cape Gloucester, New Guinea | P-38 | 9 FS, 49 FG |
| October 15, 1943 | 2; 1 | Aichi D3A; Nakajima Ki-43 | Oro Bay, New Guinea | P-38 | 9 FS, 49 FG |
| October 23, 1943 | 1 | Mitsubishi A6M | Rabaul, New Guinea | P-38 | 9 FS, 49 FG |
| November 2, 1943 | 2 | Mitsubishi A6M | Simpson Harbour, New Guinea | P-38 | 9 FS, 49 FG |
| December 10, 1943 | 1 | Kawasaki Ki-61 | Gusap, New Guinea | P-47 Thunderbolt | 9 FS, 49 FG |
| January 18, 1944 | 1 | Mitsubishi A6M | Wewak, New Guinea | P-47 | 9 FS, 49 FG |
| October 14, 1944 | 1; 1 | Nakajima Ki-43; Nakajima Ki-44 | Balikpapan, Dutch East Indies | P-38 | 9 FS, 49 FG |
| October 27, 1944 | 1; 1 | Nakajima Ki-43; Aichi D3A | Tacloban, Philippines; Carigara Bay, Philippines | P-38 | 9 FS, 49 FG |
| November 11, 1944 | 2 | Mitsubishi A6M | Ormoc Bay, Philippines | P-38 | 9 FS, 49 FG |
| December 7, 1944 | 3; 1 | Nakajima Ki-43; Nakajima Ki-49 | Cebu, Philippines | P-38 | 9 FS, 49 FG |
| April 2, 1945 | 1 | Nakajima Ki-44 | Hong Kong | P-38 | 9 FS, 49 FG |

SOURCES: Air Force Historical Study 85: USAF Credits for the Destruction of Enemy Aircraft, World War II

== Bibliography ==
- Bruning, John (2004). Jungle Ace: Col. Gerald R. Johnson, the USAAF's Top Fighter Leader of the Pacific War. Potomac Books. ASIN B00FBBV2R8.
- Holmes, Tony (2013). 'Twelve to One' V Fighter Command Aces of the Pacific. Bloomsbury Publishing. ISBN 9781472800862.
