= Natalie K. Wight =

American lawyer

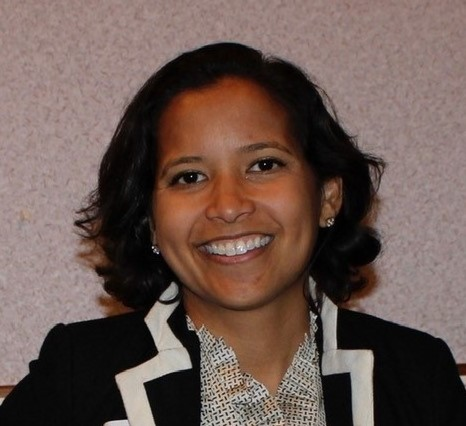

United States Attorney for the District of Oregon
- In office September 12, 2022 – February 18, 2025
- President: Joe Biden; Donald Trump
- Preceded by: Billy J. Williams
- Succeeded by: William Narus

Personal details
- Born: 1974 or 1975 (age 51–52)
- Education: College of Idaho (BS); California State University, Chico (MS); University of Notre Dame (JD)

Natalie K. Wight (born 1974/1975) is an American lawyer who was the United States attorney for the District of Oregon.

== Education ==
Wight is a 1992 graduate of Cleveland High School of Portland, Oregon. She received a Bachelor of Science from the College of Idaho in 1996, a Master of Science from California State University, Chico in 2000 and a Juris Doctor from the University of Notre Dame Law School in 2003.

== Career ==
Wight was an attorney at the Federal Bureau of Prisons from 2003 to 2008. From 2008 to 2012, she served as an assistant United States attorney in the United States Attorney's Office for the Northern District of California. From 2012 to 2022, she served as an assistant United States attorney in the United States Attorney's Office for the District of Oregon.

=== U.S. attorney for the District of Oregon ===
On June 6, 2022, President Joe Biden nominated Wight to be the United States attorney for the District of Oregon. Her nomination was supported by Senators Ron Wyden and Jeff Merkley. On September 8, 2022, she was confirmed in the Senate by voice vote. She assumed office on September 12, 2022. On February 18, 2025, she was fired by the Second Trump administration and replaced by her first assistant, William Narus.

Legal offices
Preceded by Billy J. Williams	United States Attorney for the District of Oregon; 2022–2025	Succeeded by William Narus
