= Dennis Patera =

American football player (born 1945)

No. 14, 90
- Position: Placekicker

Personal information
- Born: October 17, 1945 (age 81); Portland, Oregon, U.S.
- Listed height: 6 ft 0 in (1.83 m)
- Listed weight: 214 lb (97 kg)

Career information
- High school: Cleveland (Portland)
- College: BYU (1967)
- NFL draft: 1968: 17th round, 449th overall pick

Career history
- San Francisco 49ers (1968); Portland Loggers (1969)

Career NFL statistics
- Field goals: 2/8
- Field goal %: 25
- Longest field goal: 21
- Extra points: 10/13
- Extra point %: 76.9
- Stats at Pro Football Reference

Dennis Allen Patera (born October 17, 1945) is an American former professional football player who was a placekicker for one season with the San Francisco 49ers of the National Football League (NFL). He was selected by the 49ers in the seventeenth round of the 1968 NFL/AFL draft. He first enrolled at Columbia Basin College before transferring to play college football for the BYU Cougars.

== Early life ==
Patera was a two-year letterman in football and a three-year letterman in track and field at Cleveland High School in Portland, Oregon. He earned All-PIL Honorable Mention honors in football. He was also the PIL Discus champion and State Meet Discus champion in track. Patera was inducted into the PIL Hall of Fame in 2011.

== College career ==
Patera initially attended Columbia Basin College. He transferred to Brigham Young University and was a letterman in football and track for the BYU Cougars. He set school records in football for most points scored and longest field goal with a 53 yarder. Patera was also 2nd place in WAC Discus in track.

== Professional career ==
Patera was selected in the 17th round by the San Francisco 49ers of the NFL with the 449th pick in the 1968 NFL/AFL draft. He played in five games for the team during the 1968 season.

== Personal life ==
Patera is the brother of professional wrestler Ken Patera and American football player and coach Jack Patera.
