= Billy J. Williams =

American lawyer (born 1956)

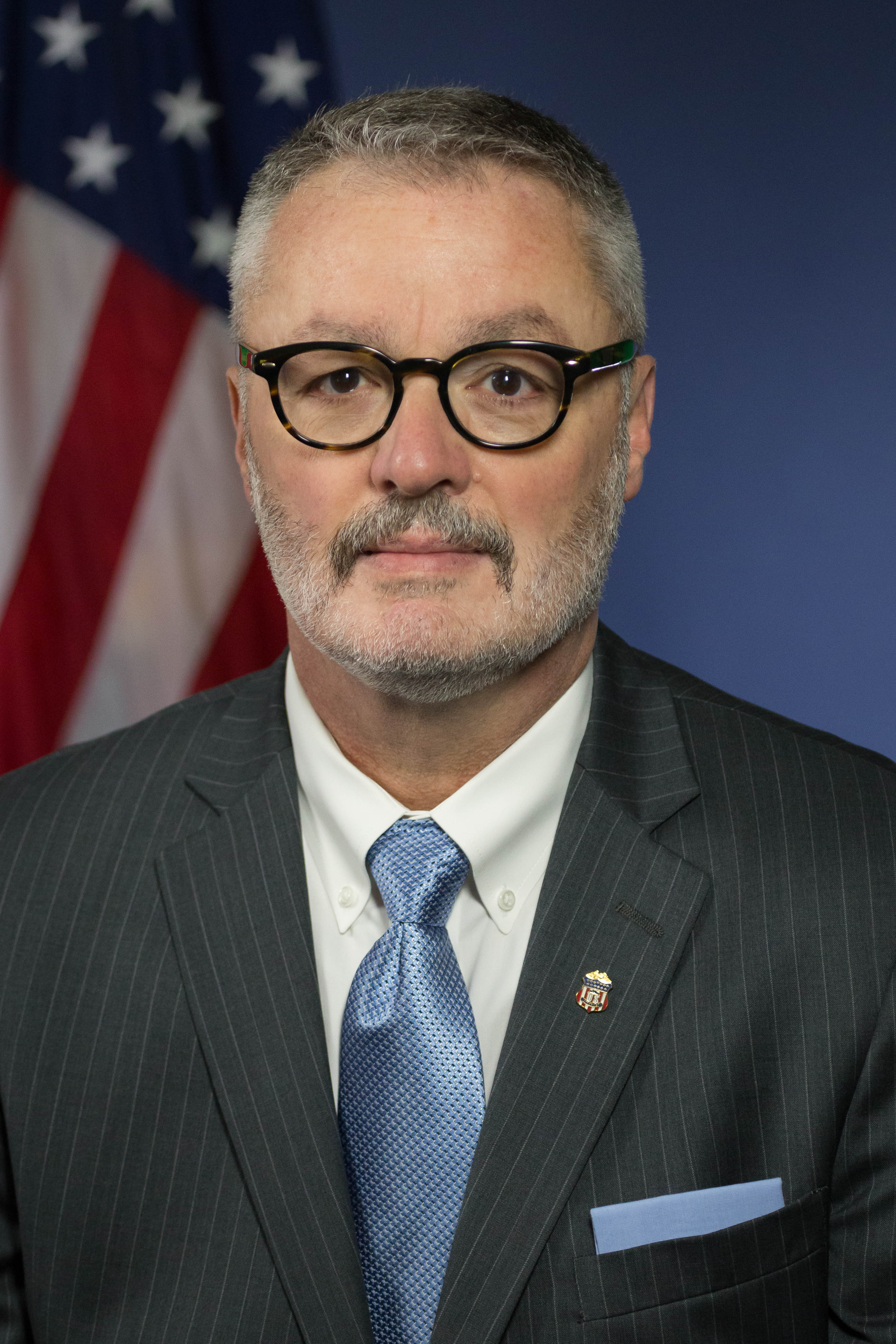

United States Attorney for the District of Oregon
- In office December 18, 2015 – February 28, 2021
- President: Barack Obama; Donald Trump; Joe Biden
- Preceded by: Amanda Marshall
- Succeeded by: Natalie K. Wight

Personal details
- Born: 1956 (age 69–70) Toppenish, Washington, U.S.
- Education: Washington State University (AB); Willamette University (JD)

Billy John Williams (born 1956) is an American attorney who served as the United States attorney for the District of Oregon from 2015 to 2021. He was most recently confirmed to the position by the U.S. Senate in March 2018. Williams was originally named Acting U.S. Attorney of the district in April 2015 and was appointed to the position by Chief U.S. District Judge Michael W. Mosman in February 2016. In November 2017, Williams was nominated by President Donald Trump to retain the position. His nomination was supported by Jeff Merkley and Ron Wyden, Oregon's U.S. Senators.

== Early life and education ==
Williams received a Bachelor of Arts in 1981 from Washington State University and his Juris Doctor in 1989 at the Willamette University College of Law. Before entering federal service, he was a Deputy District Attorney in Multnomah County, Oregon.

== Career ==
In 2017, he wrote an opinion piece in The Oregonian stating that "Oregon's sanctuary status declaration directly contravenes federal immigration law and threatens public safety".

In February 2018, Williams convened a federal law enforcement summit in Portland at which he stated Oregon has a "formidable marijuana overproduction and diversion problem". Oregon's Governor Kate Brown said that Williams told her "lawful Oregon businesses remain stakeholders in this conversation and not targets of law enforcement." That and other comments were taken as "reassurances for rule-following Oregon [cannabis] businesses" in the wake of the January 2018 rescission of the Cole Memorandum.

In August 2020, he announced that 74 people would be charged "for crimes committed adjacent to or under the guise of peaceful demonstrations in Portland", including for assault, destruction of federal property, failing to obey lawful orders, and disorderly conduct.

On February 12, 2021, he announced his resignation, effective February 28.

Legal offices
Preceded by Amanda Marshall	United States Attorney for the District of Oregon; 2015–2021	Succeeded by Natalie K. Wight
