= Phoebe Cole =

American artist (1955–2017)

- Born: July 15, 1955; Eugene, Oregon
- Died: January 14, 2017 (aged 61); Eugene
- Education: University of Oregon

Phoebe Cole Gordon (July 15, 1955 – January 14, 2017) was an American artist.

== Early life ==
Gordon was born Phoebe Cole in Eugene, Oregon on July 15, 1955, the second child of Nonnie and Paul Cole. As a child, she was not allowed to sit and watch television without doing something her mother deemed "constructive," so she was provided drawing paper and colored pencils. From this, Gordon learned to doodle while she watched cartoons. She attended South Eugene High School and Oregon Episcopal School (Portland). Her college education included one year at Colorado University. After returning to Eugene she worked at Cole Artist Supply as a picture framer and met her future husband, Doug Wilson. Returning to her studies, she graduated from the University of Oregon with a Bachelor of Fine Arts in Printmaking in 1981.

== Career ==
Gordon studied printmaking at the University of Oregon with LaVerne Krauss. Her cohort included Jennifer Guske and Libby Unthank. Following her completion of a BFA in Printmaking, Gordon produced multicolored linoleum cuts and sold them to galleries around the United States. Gordon's prints were exhibited widely during the 1980s and 1990s. Soon after, she moved on from printmaking to creating papier-mâché altarpieces and dioramas, which were featured in two solo exhibitions in San Francisco in 1990 and 1993. From 2008, she created ceramic sculptures, acknowledging the influence of Mexican folk art and making Day of the Dead pieces.

== Notable artwork ==
- The Famous Fandango (1981), screenprint on paper (Smithsonian American Art Museum)
- We're Having a Heat Wave (1982), color linocut on wove paper (National Gallery of Art)
- Shu Shu Wah (1984), color linocut on paper (Smithsonian American Art Museum)
