= Linwood Holton =

American politician (1923–2021)

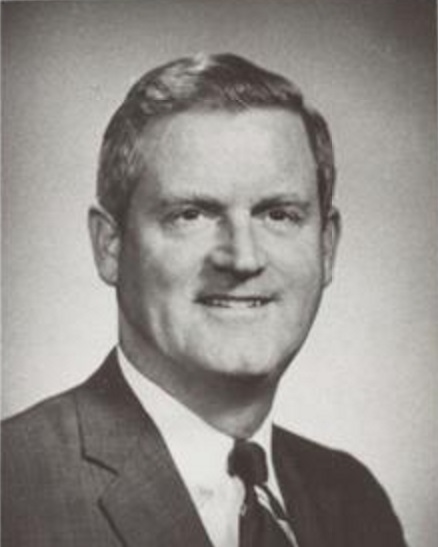
- Holton, circa 1970

13th United States Assistant Secretary of State for Legislative Affairs
- In office February 28, 1974 – January 31, 1975
- President: Richard Nixon; Gerald Ford
- Preceded by: Marshall Wright
- Succeeded by: Robert J. McCloskey

61st Governor of Virginia
- In office January 17, 1970 – January 12, 1974
- Lieutenant: Sargeant Reynolds; Henry Howell
- Preceded by: Mills Godwin
- Succeeded by: Mills Godwin

Personal details
- Born: Abner Linwood Holton Jr. September 21, 1923 Big Stone Gap, Virginia U.S.
- Died: October 28, 2021 (aged 98) Kilmarnock, Virginia U.S.
- Party: Republican
- Spouse: Jinks Rogers (m. 1953)
- Children: 4; including Anne, Woody, and Dwight
- Education: Washington and Lee University (BS); Harvard University (LLB)

Military service
- Allegiance: United States
- Branch/service: United States Navy
- Years of service: 1942–1969
- Rank: Captain
- Battles/wars: World War II; Korean War

Abner Linwood Holton Jr. (September 21, 1923 – October 28, 2021) was an American politician and attorney. He served as the 61st governor of Virginia, from 1970 to 1974, and was the first Republican governor of Virginia since the Reconstruction era. He was known for supporting civil rights, integration, and public investment.

== Early life ==
Abner Linwood Holton Jr. was born on September 21, 1923, in Big Stone Gap, Virginia, the son of Edith (Van Gorder), a homemaker, and Abner Linwood Holton, the executive of a small coal-hauling railroad. In his 2008 memoir, he wrote that could not remember a time as a youth when the goal of a Virginia governorship was not at the back of his mind. At his Stone Gap High School reunion in 1990, a childhood friend joked that he had sought the governorship since the 4th grade.

Holton entered Washington and Lee University in Lexington, Virginia, in 1941. After the Japanese Attack on Pearl Harbor, he enlisted in the United States Navy on July 4, 1942. He received a commission after graduating in 1944 with B.S. degree in commerce, cum laude, and served on active duty submarine service throughout World War II and in the Navy Reserve for more than two decades afterwards. He graduated from Harvard Law School in 1949.

Prior to entering politics, he was an attorney in Roanoke, Virginia.

== Political career ==
Holton was active in the Republican Party when it was weak in Virginia, being one of the leading Republicans who fought the Byrd Organization during the four decades it dominated Virginia politics.

In 1965, Holton ran for governor as the Republican candidate and was defeated by Democrat Mills E. Godwin Jr. In 1969, Holton won 52.51% of the vote in the gubernatorial election, defeating Democrat William C. Battle, Virginia Conservative Beverly B. McDowell, American Independent William A. Pennington, and Independent George R. Walker. He became the first Republican governor of Virginia since 1869.

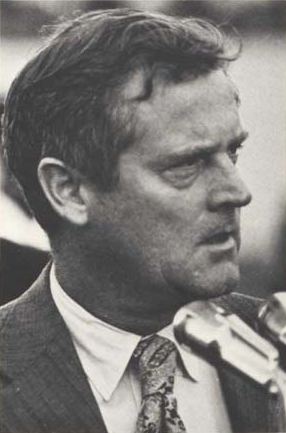
Holton at Virginia Tech in 1971

In 1970, when desegregation was an issue in Virginia, Holton voluntarily placed his children, including future First Lady Anne Holton, in the mostly-black Richmond Public Schools, garnering much publicity.

As governor, he increased employment of blacks and women in state government, created the Virginia Governor's Schools Program in 1973, provided the first state funds for community mental health centers, and supported environmental efforts.

A moderate Republican, Holton was against welcoming conservative Byrd Democrats into the Virginia Republican Party. As the GOP moved increasingly rightward, it turned its back on Holton. When Harry F. Byrd Jr. broke ranks with the increasingly liberal national Democrats and ran as an independent for the Senate in 1970, Holton insisted on running a Republican candidate rather than endorsing Byrd. That eventually led to the nomination of Ray Garland. Byrd went on to win the three-way election with an absolute majority.

Holton also encouraged a moderate Republican to run in the 1971 special election to choose a successor for deceased Lieutenant Governor J. Sargeant Reynolds, an election that was won by another independent, populist Henry Howell.

As Virginia does not allow governors to serve consecutive terms, Holton was not eligible to run in 1973, so Mills Godwin, the conservative former Democrat who had defeated Holton in the 1965 election, became the Republican nominee. Godwin had supported massive resistance to racial integration and had first identified himself as a Republican in his speech accepting the Virginia Republican convention's nomination for governor.

== Later life ==
Following his term as governor, Holton served one year in the Nixon Administration as the Assistant Secretary of State for Congressional Relations. (Note: The position was later renamed as the Assistant Secretary of State for Legislative Affairs) After leaving Washington, he practiced law as a shareholder at McCandlish Holton, P.C.

Holton later unsuccessfully sought the Republican nomination for the United States Senate in 1978, finishing third in a race against Richard D. Obenshain, John Warner, and Nathan H. Miller. Warner subsequently became the nominee after Obenshain's death in a plane crash.

Under Gerald Baliles (1986–1990), he served as interim president of the Center for Innovative Technology in Northern Virginia, where he guided it through managerial difficulties.

After his retirement, Holton supported moderate Republicans, including John Warner. As the Virginia Republican Party became more conservative, however, he found himself more in line with the state Democratic Party and endorsed several Democrats for statewide office, including his son-in-law, Governor Tim Kaine. Holton endorsed Barack Obama in the 2008 presidential election.

The Holtons had four children: Tayloe, Anne, Woody, and Dwight. Anne is married to U.S. Senator and former Virginia Governor Tim Kaine, the nominee of the Democratic Party for Vice President of the United States in 2016. She was the first First Lady of Virginia to live in Virginia's Executive Mansion both as a child and as a First Lady. (Note: Thomas Jefferson's daughter Martha Jefferson Randolph, known as "Patsy", was married to Virginia Governor Thomas Mann Randolph Jr. but never lived in the Mansion.) In January 2014, Anne Holton was named Virginia Secretary of Education. Woody Holton (Abner Linwood Holton III) has published three books, including Unruly Americans and the Origins of the Constitution (2007), a finalist for the National Book Award, and Forced Founders: Indians, Debtors, Slaves and the Making of the American Revolution in Virginia (1999). His third book, a biography of Abigail Adams, won the Bancroft Prize in 2010. Dwight Holton served as acting U.S. Attorney for Oregon from 2010 to 2011. He later lost to Ellen Rosenblum in the May 2012 primary in the race for Oregon Attorney General.

In 1999, Linwood Holton Elementary School, in Richmond, Virginia, was named in his honor.

In November 2005, Holton underwent surgery for bladder cancer. In 2006, Holton, his wife Jinks, daughter Anne and son-in-law Tim Kaine opposed a proposed constitutional ban on same-sex marriage in Virginia.

The University of Virginia Press published his memoir, Opportunity Time, in March 2008. He was a long-time member of the Governing Council of the University of Virginia's Miller Center of Public Affairs.

In 2017, the City of Roanoke hosted Holton for the dedication of a plaza named in his honor.

On the day of Ralph Northam's inauguration in January 2018, Holton sat front and center for a photograph with Northam and nine other former governors who had followed Holton, including Bob McDonnell, Jim Gilmore, Tim Kaine, Terry McAuliffe, George Allen, Mark Warner, L. Douglas Wilder, Chuck Robb, and Gerald Baliles.

== Personal life ==
Holton married Virginia "Jinks" Rogers on January 10, 1953. She was a CIA intelligence analyst and the daughter of a leading Roanoke Democratic Party figure. Together, they had four children, Anne, Tayloe, Woody, and Dwight. Anne is married to Tim Kaine, who served as governor of Virginia from 2006 through 2010, and has served as a United States Senator from Virginia since 2013. Kaine was the 2016 Democratic vice presidential nominee.

== Death, memorial, and legacy ==
Linwood Holton died of natural causes at his home in Kilmarnock on October 28, 2021, at age 98. The memorial service for Holton in December 2021 at Second Presbyterian Church in Richmond included tributes to his belief in civil rights and school desegregation. In attendance were Gov. Ralph Northam, the other eight living governors of the state, and Gov.-elect Glenn Youngkin. Ann Compton noted that when Holton took office, there were only 31 Republicans among the 141 members of the state legislature.

Holton's tenure as governor ushered in a new era, bringing seven Republican governors elected compared to seven Democratic governors.

== Notes ==
Party political offices
Preceded by H. Clyde Pearson	Republican nominee for Governor of Virginia; 1965, 1969	Succeeded by Mills Godwin
Preceded by William Milliken	Chair of the Republican Governors Association; 1972–1973	Succeeded by Winfield Dunn
Political offices
Preceded by Mills Godwin	Governor of Virginia; 1970–1974	Succeeded by Mills Godwin
Preceded by Marshall Wright	Assistant Secretary of State for Legislative Affairs; 1974–1975	Succeeded by Robert J. McCloskey
