= Governor of Virginia =

Head of government of Virginia

Governor of the Commonwealth of Virginia
- Commonwealth seal

- State flag

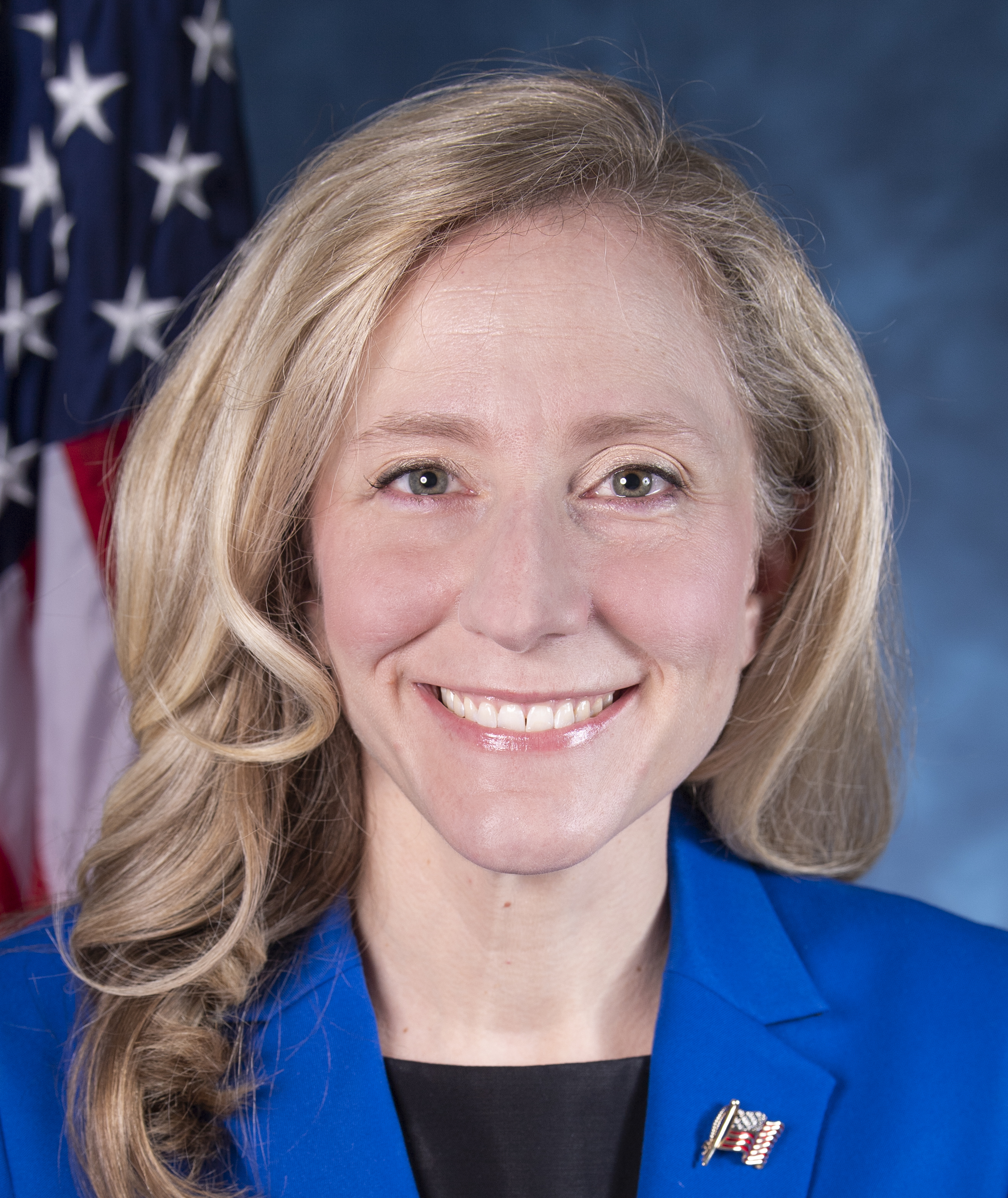
- Incumbent; Abigail Spanberger since January 17, 2026
- Government of Virginia
- Style: Governor (informal); The Honorable (formal)
- Status: Chief executive; Head of government; Commander-in-chief
- Residence: Virginia Executive Mansion
- Term length: Four years, not eligible for immediate re-election
- Precursor: Governor of the Colony of Virginia
- Formation: July 5, 1776
- First holder: Patrick Henry
- Succession: Line of succession
- Deputy: Lieutenant Governor of Virginia
- Salary: $175,000 (2024)
- Website: Official website

The governor of the Commonwealth of Virginia is the head of government of the Commonwealth of Virginia. The governor is head of the executive branch of the government of Virginia and is the commander-in-chief of the Virginia National Guard and Virginia Defense Force.

Three signatories of the Declaration of Independence served as governor of Virginia and three governors became president of the United States: Thomas Jefferson, James Monroe, and John Tyler.

The current officeholder is Abigail Spanberger, a member of the Democratic Party who took office on January 17, 2026. She is Virginia's first female governor.

== Oath of office ==
On inauguration day, the governor-elect takes the following oath of office: "I do solemnly swear (or affirm) that I will support the Constitution of the United States, and the Constitution of the Commonwealth of Virginia, and that I will faithfully and impartially discharge all the duties incumbent upon me as Governor of the Commonwealth of Virginia, according to the best of my ability. (So help me, God.)"

== Qualifications ==
Article V, Section 3 of the Virginia Constitution lists the following qualifications for a person to be elected Governor of Virginia:

- Be a citizen of the United States
- Be at least thirty years old
- Be a resident and a registered voter in the Commonwealth of Virginia for at least five years before the election

Unlike other state governors, Virginia governors are not allowed to serve consecutive terms. They have been barred from immediate re-election since the adoption of Virginia's second constitution, in 1830. However, a former governor is permitted to run for a second term in a future election. Only two governors since 1830, William Smith and Mills Godwin, have been elected to additional terms. Smith's second term came after Virginia seceded from the Union, while Godwin became the first ever governor in American history to be elected by both major parties when the former Democrat was elected in 1973 as a Republican. The only other governors to serve non-consecutive terms in office are Patrick Henry and James Monroe, with George William Smith serving twice as acting governor before becoming official governor.

To get on the ballot for governor of Virginia, each candidate must file 10,000 signatures, including the signatures of at least 400 qualified voters from each of the 11 congressional districts in the Commonwealth.

== Duties ==
The governor is the head of government in Virginia. At the beginning of every regular session, they must report the state of the Commonwealth to the Virginia General Assembly (both the House of Delegates and the Senate). They must convene the legislature when two-thirds of each house calls for a special session. The governor must ensure that the laws of the Commonwealth are faithfully executed by either signing, or allowing it to come into law, or vetoing, not allowing it to become law. They are responsible for the safety of the state, as they serve as commander-in-chief of the Virginia Militia.

== Powers ==
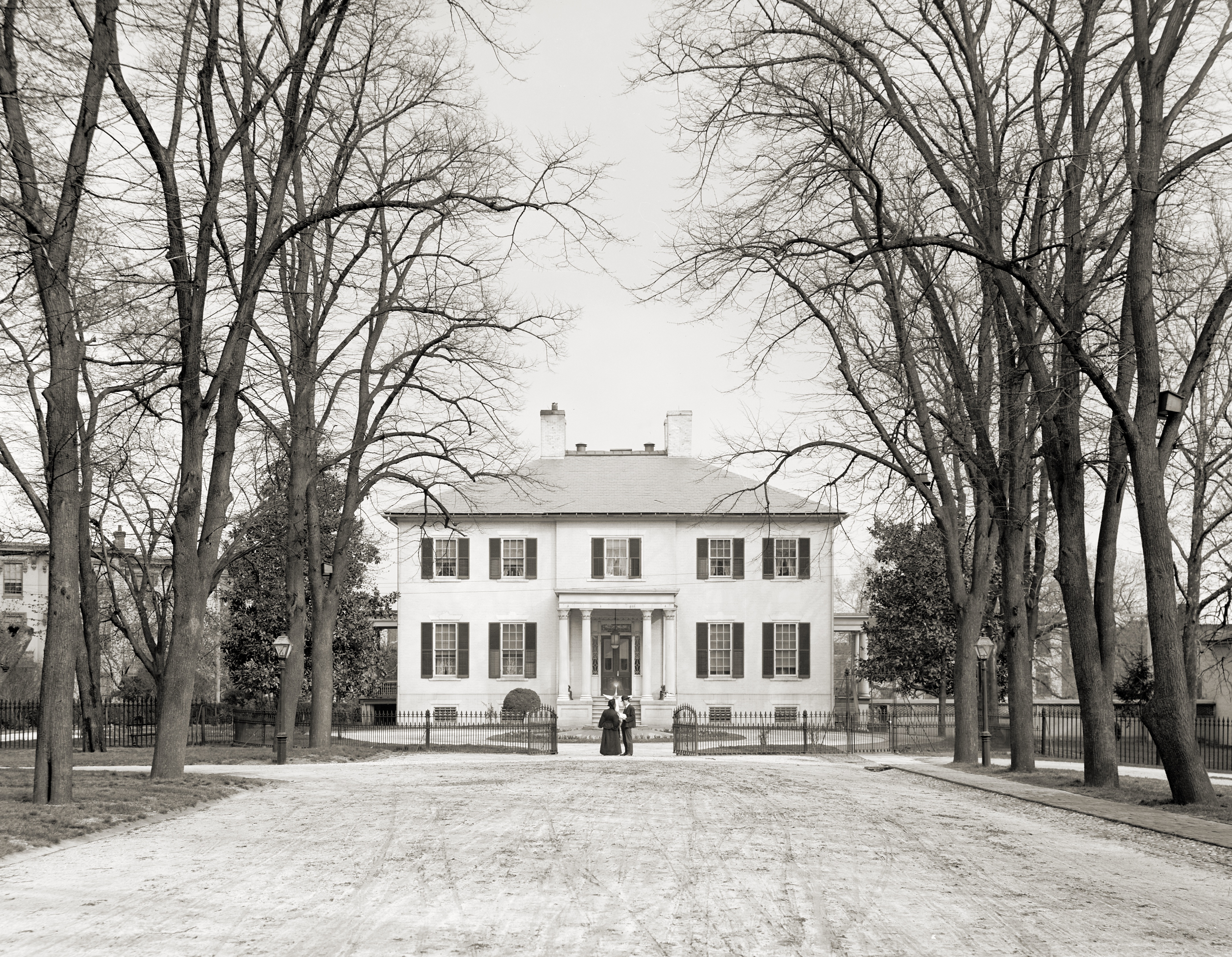
The Governor's Mansion in Virginia, 1905

- The governor has the legislative power to submit recommendations and to call special sessions when deemed necessary.
- The governor has veto powers. All bills must be sent to the governor before becoming law. The governor may sign the bill, let it sit unsigned for seven days, after which it becomes law, or veto the legislation. After a veto, the bill returns to its house of origin and may be overridden by two-thirds of the vote in each house.
- The governor also has the power to use a line-item veto. The governor may send legislation back to the legislature with recommendations and amendments. The legislature must either approve the changes by a majority in each house or override the veto with a two-thirds majority in each house.
- The governor is commander-in-chief of Virginia's militia forces.
- The governor may also communicate with other states and foreign powers.
- The governor has the power to fill vacancies in positions unless the position is appointed by the legislature.
- The governor may commute fines or sentences and issue pardons. The governor may also restore voting rights and overturn other political penalties on individuals.

== Succession ==
Established by Article V, Section 16 of the Constitution of Virginia.

Succession order	Office	Current officeholder
0	Governor of Virginia	Abigail Spanberger (D)
1	Lieutenant Governor	Ghazala Hashmi (D)
2	Attorney General	Jay Jones (D)
3	Speaker of the House of Delegates	Don Scott (D)
4	House of Delegates convenes to fill the vacancy	

== History ==
=== Colony and province ===
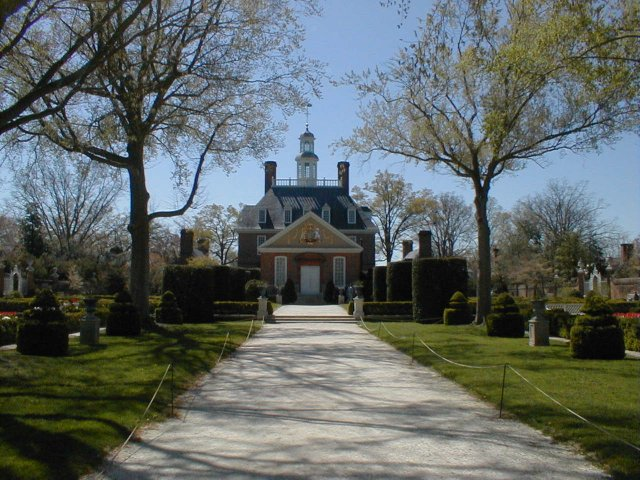
The reconstructed colonial Governor's Palace in Williamsburg, Virginia

The position of governor of Virginia dates back to the 1607 first permanent English settlement in America, at Jamestown on the north shore of the James River upstream from Hampton Roads harbor at the mouth of the Chesapeake Bay. The Virginia Company of London set up a government-run by a council. The president of the council served as a governor. The council was based in London and controlled the colony from afar. Nominally, Thomas Smith was the first president of the council, but he never left England. Edward Maria Wingfield was the first president of the council in residence in the new province, making him the first to exercise the actual authority of governing Virginia. The Virginia Company soon abandoned governance by council two years after the landing on May 23, 1609, and replacing it with a governor, John Smith (1580–1631).

In 1624, the English monarchy of King James I (1566–1625, reigned 1603–1625), in the last year of his reign, of the royal House of Stuart took control from the Virginia Company and its stockholders and made Virginia a crown colony. Governors continued to be appointed by the monarch for many years. Most often, the appointed governor would reside in England while a deputy or lieutenant governor exercised authority. The royal rule was interrupted during the English Civil War (1642–1646 / 1648–1649), after which governors were appointed by the Protectorate under Richard Cromwell (successor to Oliver Cromwell) in the interim Commonwealth of England until the English Restoration of the monarchy with King Charles II in 1660.

=== Commonwealth ===
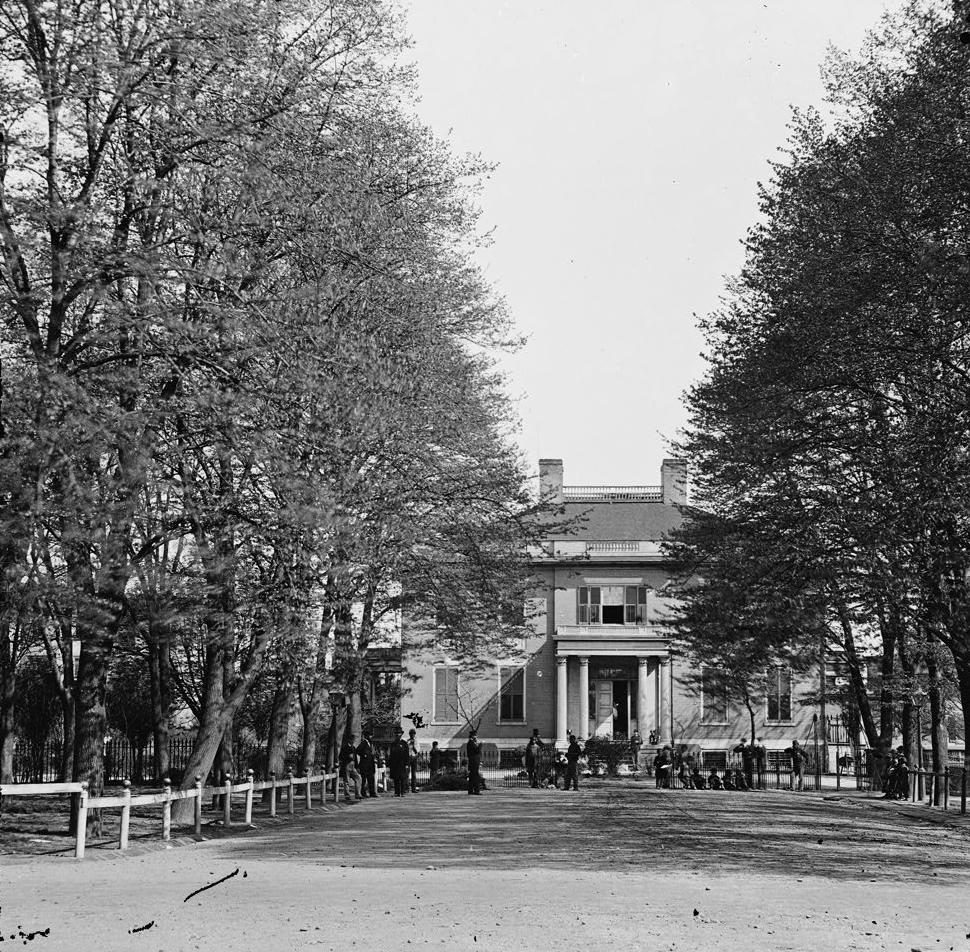
Executive Mansion of Virginia (Governor's Mansion) in Richmond, (adjacent to the Virginia State Capitol, also the second capitol of the southern Confederacy), at the end of the American Civil War, 1865

Virginia became an independent sovereign state and Commonwealth during the American Revolutionary War (1775–1783), with Patrick Henry (1736–1799, served 1776–1779 and 1786–1789) as its first governor (and also later sixth). From the Revolution until 1851, the governor was elected by the General Assembly of Virginia (commonwealth/state legislature). After 1851, in a democratic trend spreading across the Union, the state turned to popular elections for office holders.

During the American Civil War (1861–1865), Francis Harrison Pierpont was the governor of the Union-controlled parts of the state, later of which emerged the new state in the northwest of West Virginia. Pierpont also served as one of the provisional governors during the post-war Reconstruction era. These governors were appointed by the Federal government of the President and U.S. Congress, both controlled by Radical Republicans for a decade. In 1874, Virginia regained its right to self-governance and elected James L. Kemper (1823–1895), a Democrat and temporary Conservative Party member and former Confederate general as governor. After the Radical Republican appointees of the post-war Reconstruction era, Virginia would not actually elect another regular Republican as governor until A. Linwood Holton Jr. in 1969. However, in 1881 William E. Cameron was elected governor under the banner of the Readjuster Party, a coalition of Republicans and populist Democrats. Douglas Wilder became the first elected and only the second African American Governor of any U.S. state. He served as governor from 1990 to 1994.

Since 1851, Virginia's gubernatorial elections have been held in "off-years"—years in which there are no national (presidential, senatorial, or House) elections; Virginia's gubernatorial elections are held one year after U.S. presidential elections (2021, 2025, 2029, etc.) (Most states hold gubernatorial elections either on presidential-election years or midterm-election years, when there are congressional elections.) In every Virginia gubernatorial election starting with 1977, the governor elected had been from the opposite party as the president elected by the nation in the previous year, even when Virginia had voted for the president in office, as with Ronald Reagan and Barack Obama. The only exception being in 2013 with the election of Democrat Terry McAuliffe, following the re-election of President Obama in 2012.

Tim Kaine was inaugurated on January 14, 2006. Due to renovations on the Capitol in Richmond, his inauguration was held in Williamsburg, making him the first governor to be inaugurated in Williamsburg since Thomas Jefferson in 1779. The current governor of Virginia is Abigail Spanberger who was inaugurated on January 17, 2026.

== Styles ==
The governor of Virginia is addressed as "The Honorable" but may occasionally be referred to as "Excellency" if ceremonially appropriate.

== Timeline ==
Timeline of Virginia governors

== See also ==
- List of colonial governors of Virginia
- List of governors of Virginia
