= Virginia Juvenile and Domestic Relations District Court =

A Juvenile and Domestic Relations District Court, in Virginia, handles all cases involving juvenile crime, child abuse or child neglect, disputes involving custody and visitation, and other family-related matters, as well as cases in which a child or family member is an alleged victim (it can try misdemeanors, but only preliminary hearings in adult felonies). A judge hears all cases. Appeals from J&DR court go to Circuit Court.

The court also has authority to allow minors, under certain circumstances, to seek abortions. It may also emancipate a child.
