= Young Women's Christian Association (Richmond, Virginia) =

Historic building in Virginia, US

- U.S. National Register of Historic Places
- Virginia Landmarks Register
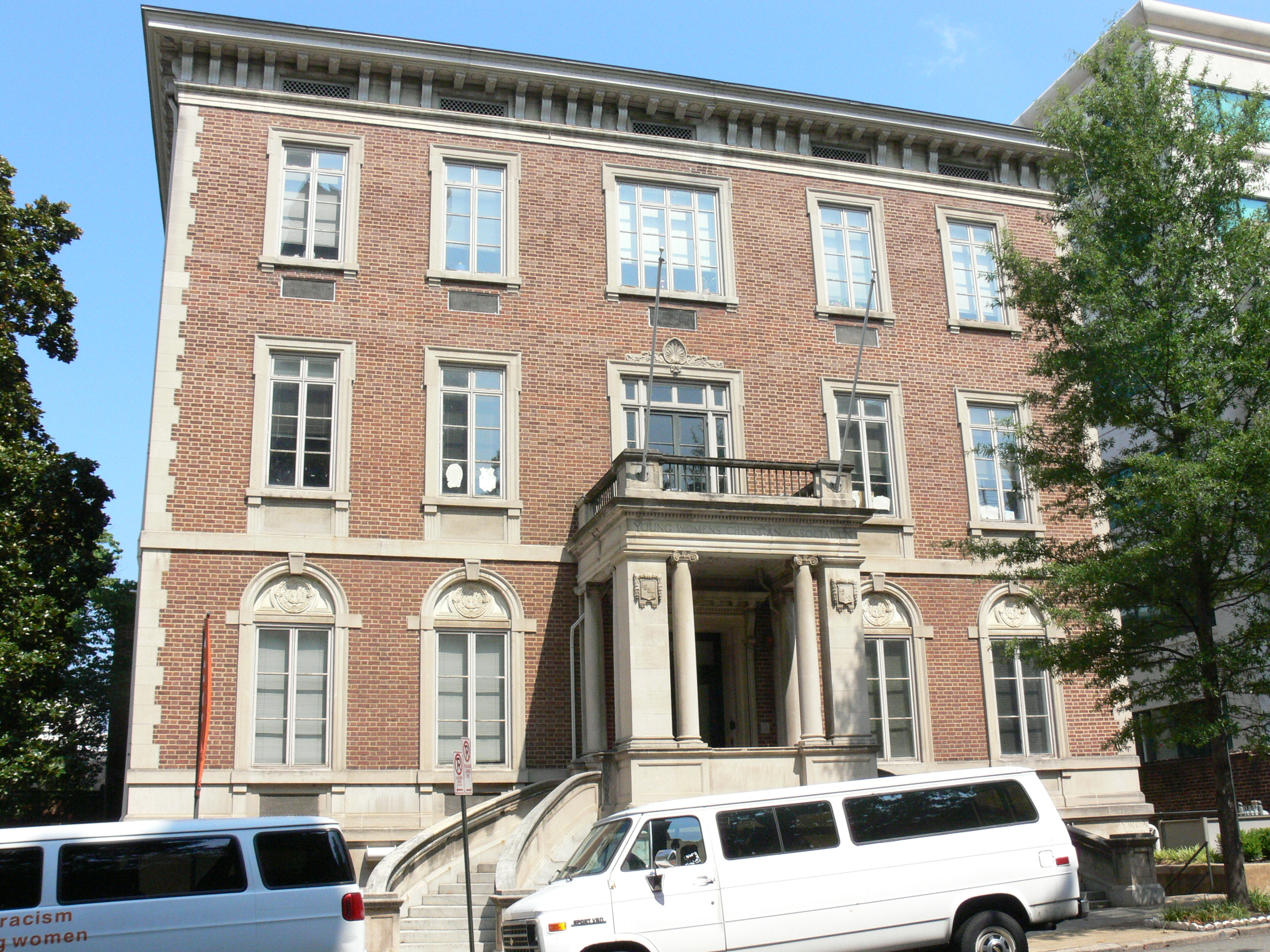
- Young Women's Christian Association, July 2011

- Location within Virginia Location within the United States
- Location: 6 N. 5th St., Richmond, Virginia
- Coordinates: 37°32′26″N 77°26′25″W
- Area: 0.3 acres (0.12 ha)
- Built: 1913-1914
- Architect: Noland & Baskervill
- Architectural style: Renaissance
- NRHP reference No.: 84003578
- VLR No.: 127-0300

Significant dates
- Added to NRHP: May 3, 1984
- Designated VLR: March 20, 1984

Young Women's Christian Association is a historic YWCA building in Richmond, Virginia. It was built in 1913–1914, and is a three-story, five-bay, brick and stone Renaissance Revival-style building. The two-story rear block contains the gymnasium. The building features an elaborately designed entry portico with a curved exterior staircase.

It was listed on the National Register of Historic Places in 1984.
