= Powell Park =

Public park in Portland, Oregon, U.S.

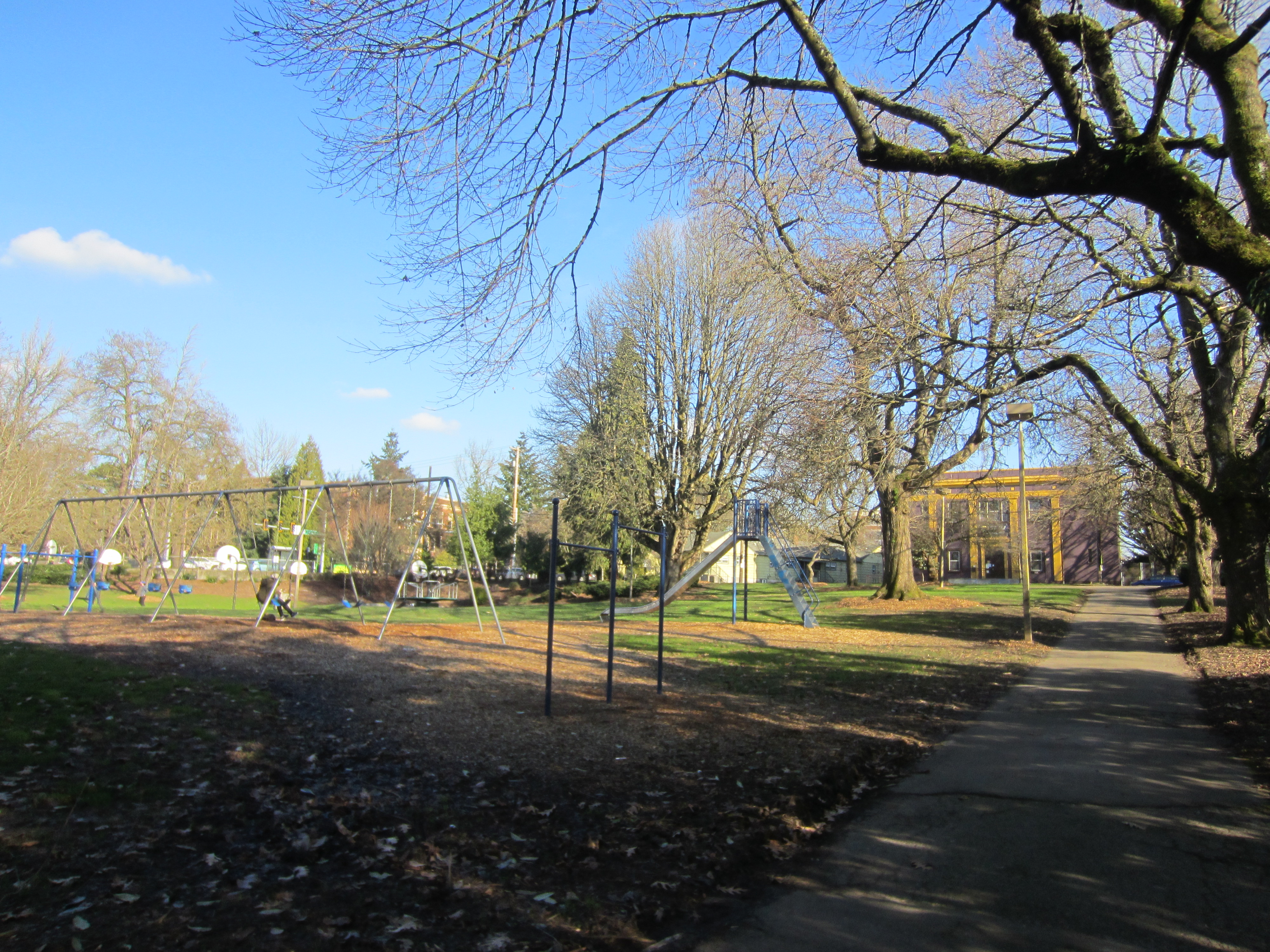
- Part of the park in 2021

- Location within Portland, Oregon
- Location: SE 26th Ave. and Powell Blvd. Portland, Oregon
- Coordinates: 45°29′52″N 122°38′30″W
- Area: 8.09 acres (3.27 ha)
- Operator: Portland Parks & Recreation

Powell Park is a 8.09-acre (3.27 ha) public park in southeast Portland, Oregon's Brooklyn neighborhood, in the United States. The space was acquired in 1921.
