= Ben Kaplan (author) =

American economist and author (born 1977)

Benjamin R. Kaplan (born 1977) is a Harvard-trained economist, public commentator specializing in education, scholarships and economics, and author of the books How to Get to College Almost for Free and The Scholarship Scouting Report, published by HarperCollins. He has written columns for The New York Times, Time, and U.S. News & World Report. His "Scholars & Dollars" education column was launched in The Oregonian (Portland's daily newspaper) in 2006. In 2008, he launched a companion radio feature on KMOX-AM in St. Louis. He is a graduate of South Eugene High School in Oregon.

== Career and book ==
Kaplan obtained over two dozen scholarships totaling $90,000 from programs including the Coca-Cola Scholars Foundation, the Hugh O'Brian Youth Leadership Foundation, and the United States Senate Youth Program. This allowed him to finance most of his Harvard education, and led him to write the book How to Get to College Almost for Free, which was published by HarperCollins, after Kaplan successfully self-published. He was selected the "Top Student Leader in America" by the National Association of Secondary School Principals.

== Media ==
Kaplan has provided media commentary for numerous outlets, including interviews on The Oprah Winfrey Show, Good Morning America, Nightline, NBC, CBS, CNN. In 2012, he was interviewed on Attack of the Show by comedian Ben Schwartz.
