= Executive Mansion (Virginia) =

Historic house in Virginia, United States

- Virginia Governor's Mansion
- U.S. National Register of Historic Places
- U.S. National Historic Landmark
- Virginia Landmarks Register
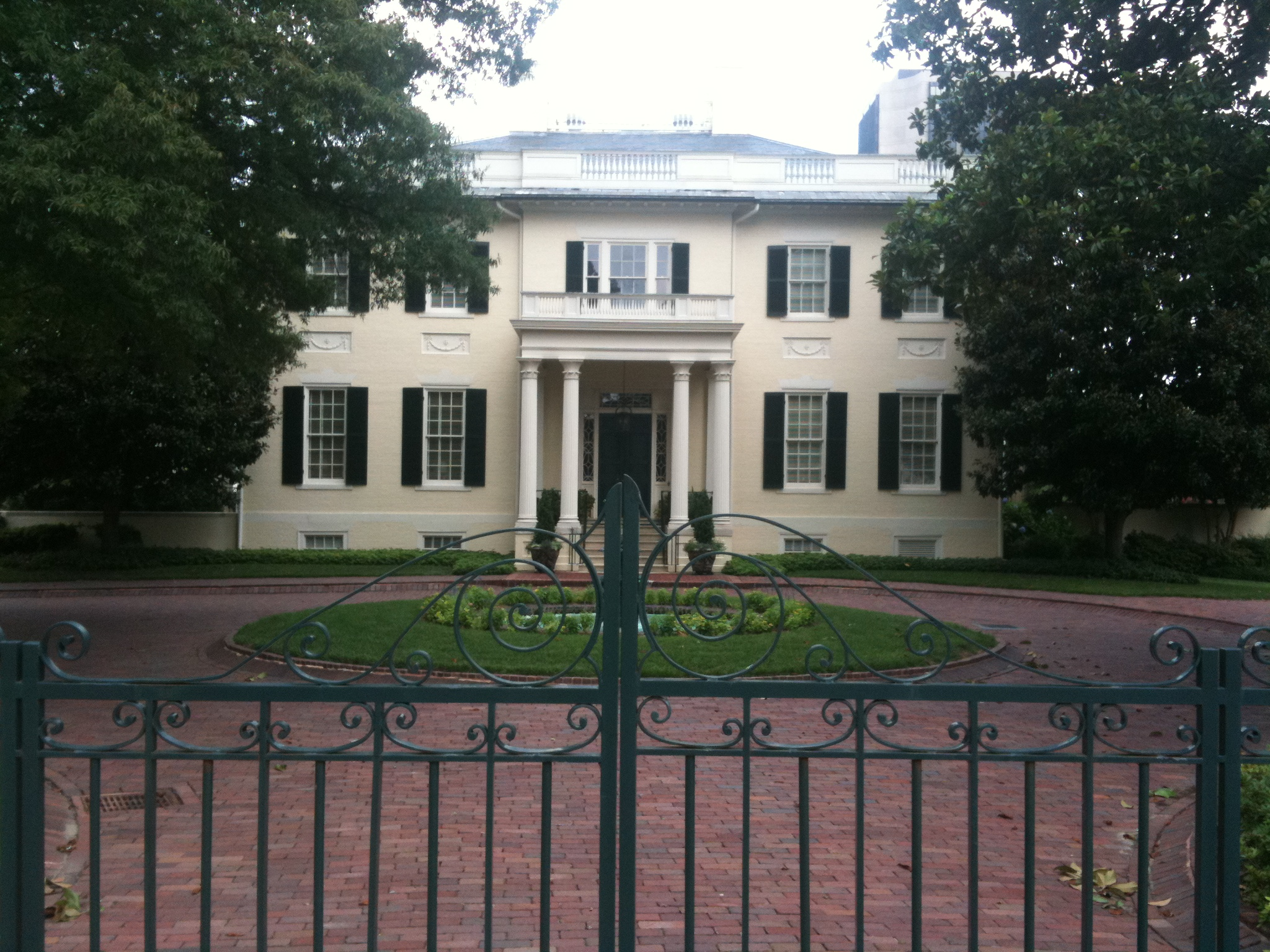
- Virginia Executive Mansion in 2011

- Location within Virginia Location within the United States
- Interactive map showing the location of Virginia Governor’s Mansion
- Location: Capitol Square, Richmond, Virginia
- Coordinates: 37°32′19″N 77°25′57″W
- Built: 1811
- Architect: Alexander Parris; Christopher Thompkins
- Architectural style: Federal
- NRHP reference No.: 69000360
- VLR No.: 127-0057

Significant dates
- Added to NRHP: June 4, 1969
- Designated NHL: June 7, 1988
- Designated VLR: November 5, 1968

The Virginia Governor's Mansion, better known as the Executive Mansion, is located in Richmond, Virginia, on Capitol Square and serves as the official residence of the governor of the Commonwealth of Virginia. Designed by Alexander Parris, it is the oldest occupied governor's mansion in the United States. It has served as the home of Virginia governors and their families since 1813. This mansion is both a Virginia and a National Historic Landmark and has had a number of renovations and expansions during the 20th century.

Adjacent and immediately north of Capitol Square is the Court End neighborhood, which houses the White House of the Confederacy. During the Civil War, the Virginia State Capitol, also in Richmond, housed offices of the Confederacy. Tours of the mansion are offered several days a week.

== History ==
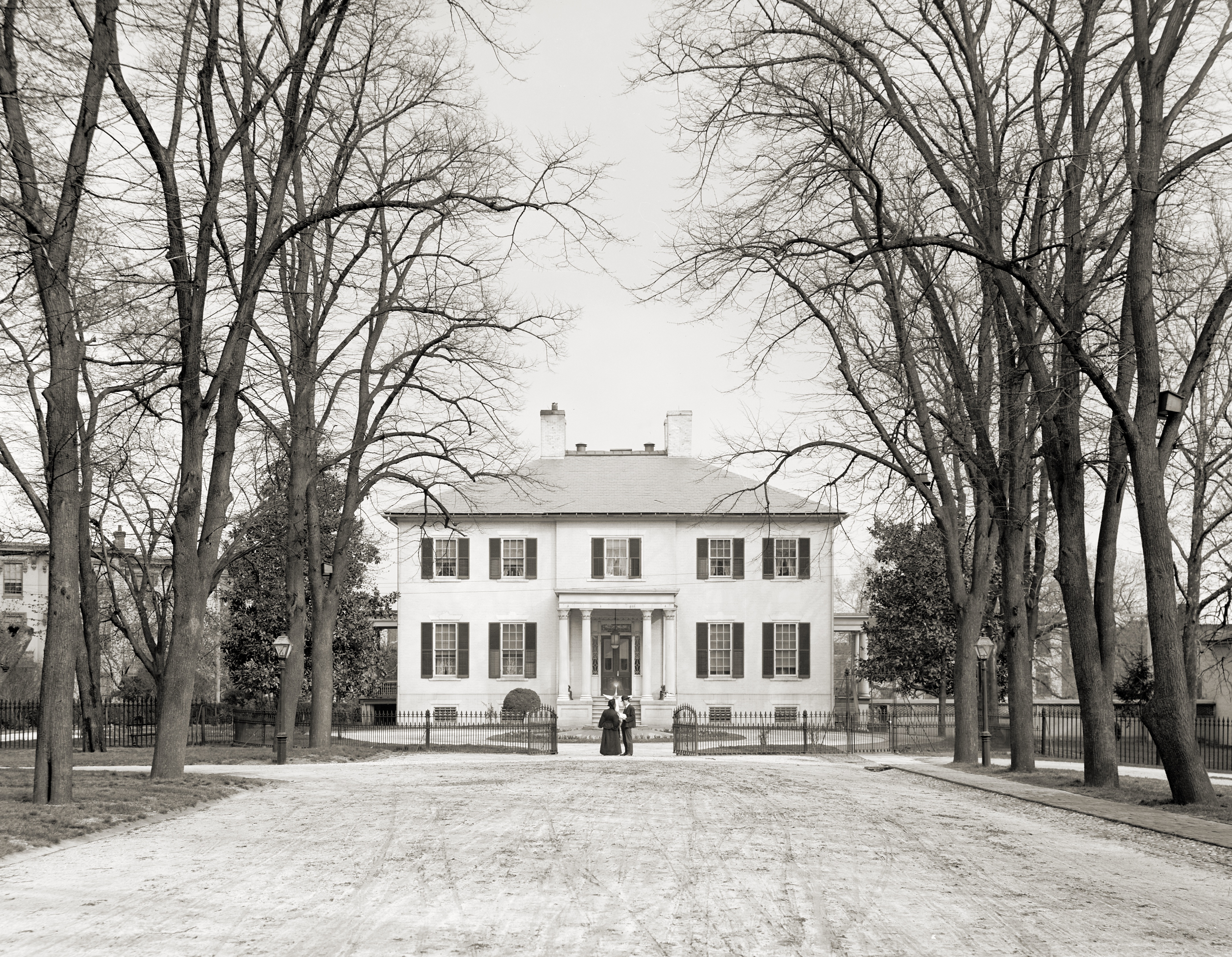
The Executive Mansion in 1905

When Richmond became the capital of Virginia in 1779, there was no residence for the governor, but Thomas Jefferson rented one. The state was so poor that it could not pay the rent in time and blamed Jefferson for the problem. The state finally paid its rent and built a residence for the governor on the site of the present building.

The law that provided for the construction of the current building was signed on February 13, 1811, by James Monroe, with the building being completed in 1813. Monroe was succeeded by George William Smith in 1811, but Smith was not the first governor to live in the mansion because he lost his life in the Richmond Theatre fire while he was saving others on December 26, 1811. His successor, James Barbour, was the first governor to live in the mansion. The term "mansion" was not used in the law authorizing it to be built, but it has been used ever since.

The gardens were redesigned in the 1950s, at the request of Governor Thomas B. Stanley, by noted landscape architect Charles Gillette.

Anne Holton lived in the mansion twice: during the 1970s when her father, A. Linwood Holton Jr., was governor, and returned to the home as Virginia's first lady when her husband, Tim Kaine, served as governor from 2006 to 2010.

Thomas Jefferson's daughter Martha Jefferson Randolph, known as "Patsy", was also the daughter and wife (to Thomas Mann Randolph Jr.) of Virginia governors, but never lived in the Mansion.

Under First Lady Roxane Gilmore, the mansion was renovated and expanded in an effort to restore the home to its historical appearance and to bring the Mansion into compliance with the Americans with Disabilities Act, while providing additional living space for the First Family.

=== In the media ===
It was featured on American Idol (season 5) when Tim Kaine and his wife, Anne Holton, welcomed Richmond-native and Idol-finalist Elliott Yamin and his family to the mansion on national television.

Restoration and remodeling work on the Mansion was shown on Bob Vila's Home Again television show's tenth season, which aired in early 2000.

The Mansion's most notable television appearance occurred on January 31, 2006, when recently inaugurated Governor Tim Kaine delivered the Democratic response to the 2006 State of the Union address. The address was delivered from the Mansion's historic ballroom.

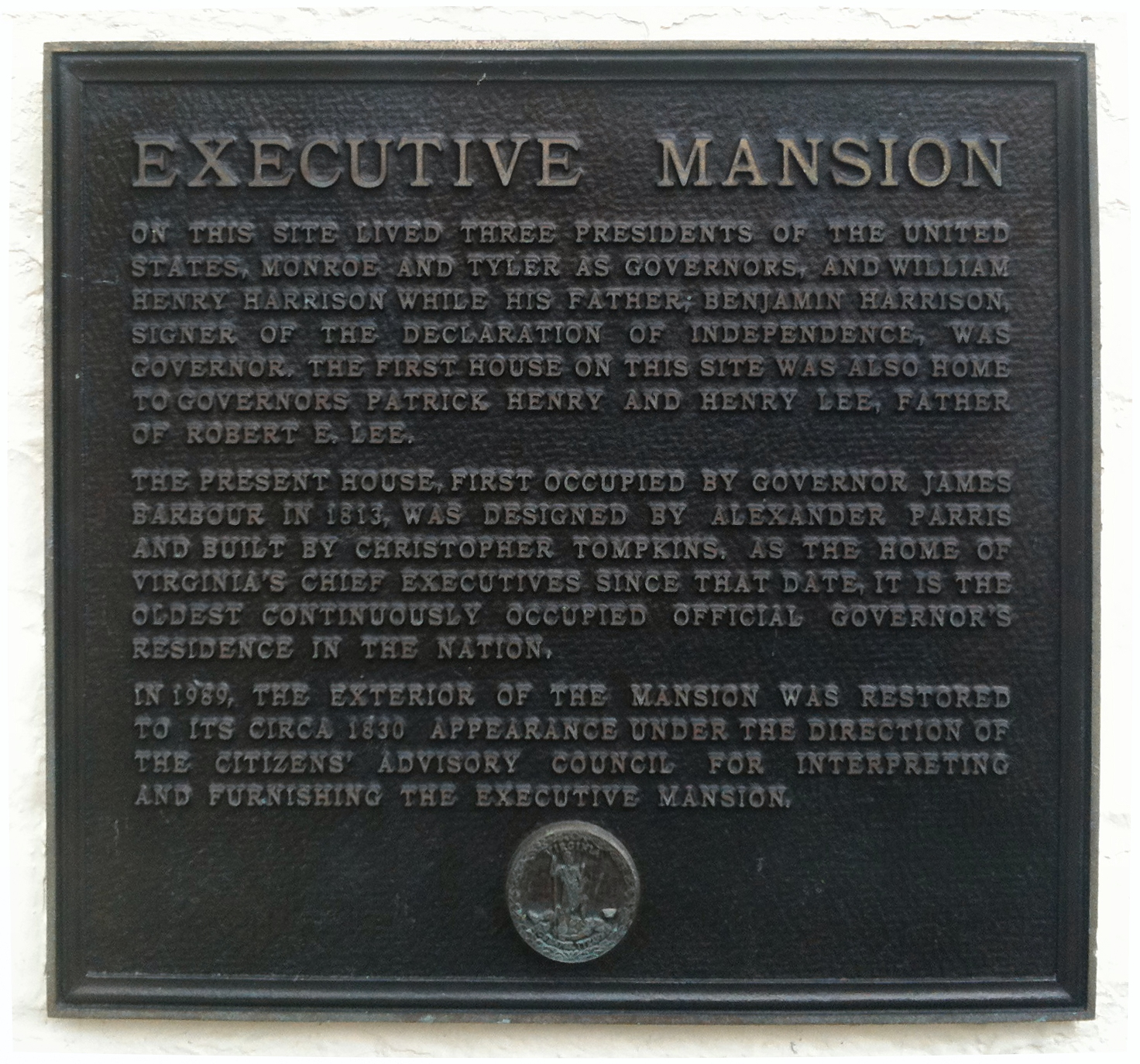
Plaque that is at the gate of the mansion, describing its history.

== Distinguished visitors ==
- Albert Edward, Prince of Wales (later King Edward VII)
- Queen Elizabeth II
- Rutherford B. Hayes
- Grover Cleveland
- William McKinley
- Theodore Roosevelt
- William Howard Taft
- Arthur Balfour
- Ferdinand Foch
- Winston Churchill
- Charles Lindbergh
- Richard Evelyn Byrd

== See also ==
- List of National Historic Landmarks in Virginia
- National Register of Historic Places listings in Richmond, Virginia
