= 1969 United States gubernatorial elections =

- November 4, 1969; January 7, 1969 (MD)

4 governorships 3 states; 1 territory (Note: including a special election in Maryland)
	Majority party	Minority party
Party	Republican	Democratic
Seats before	31	19
Seats after	32	18
Seat change	▲1	▼1
Seats up	1	2
Seats won	2	1
- Republican gain Democratic gain

United States gubernatorial elections were held on November 4, 1969, in two states and one territory, with a January 7 special election held in Maryland. Republicans achieved a net gain of one in these elections. This was the last election until 1994 where the Republicans held a majority of governorships nationwide.

== Race summary ==
State	Incumbent	Party	First elected	Result	Candidates
Maryland	Spiro Agnew	Republican	1966	Incumbent elected Vice President of the United States. New governor elected. (Note: Special election was conducted by the Maryland General Assembly.)Democratic gain.	✓ Marvin Mandel (Democratic) 70.00%; Rogers Morton (Republican) 14.44%; Francis Gallagher (Democratic) 8.33%; William S. James (Democratic) 7.22%
New Jersey	Richard J. Hughes	Democratic	1961	Incumbent term-limited. New governor elected. Democratic gain.	✓ William T. Cahill (Republican) 59.66%; Robert B. Meyner (Democratic) 38.49%; James E. Johnson (Independent) 0.45%; Jack D. Alvino (Independent) 0.43%; Winifred O. Perry (Conservative) 0.43%; Louis Vanderplate (Independent) 0.28%; Julius Levin (Socialist Labor) 0.26%
Virginia	Mills Godwin	Democratic	1965	Incumbent term-limited. New governor elected. Republican gain.	✓ Linwood Holton (Republican) 52.51%; William C. Battle (Democratic) 45.40%; Beverly B. McDowell (Virginia Conservative) 1.16%; William A. Pennington (American Independent) 0.81%; George R. Walker (Independent) 0.13%

== Closest races ==
States where the margin of victory was under 10%:

1. Virginia, 7.1%

== Maryland ==
1969 Maryland special gubernatorial election
- January 7, 1969
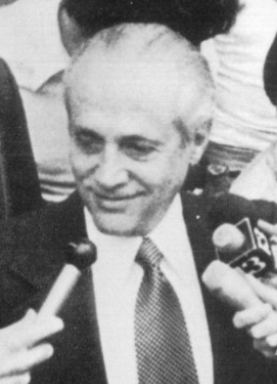

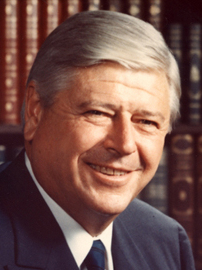
Nominee	Marvin Mandel	Rogers Morton
Party	Democratic	Republican
Electoral vote	126	26
Percentage	70.00%	14.44%
Nominee	Francis X. Gallagher	William S. James
Party	Democratic	Democratic
Electoral vote	15	13
Percentage	8.33%	7.22%
Governor before election
Spiro Agnew
Republican
Elected Governor
Marvin Mandel
Democratic

== New Jersey ==
1969 New Jersey gubernatorial election
- November 4, 1969
- Turnout: 74.2% of eligible voters (▲1.5 pp)
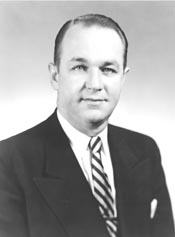

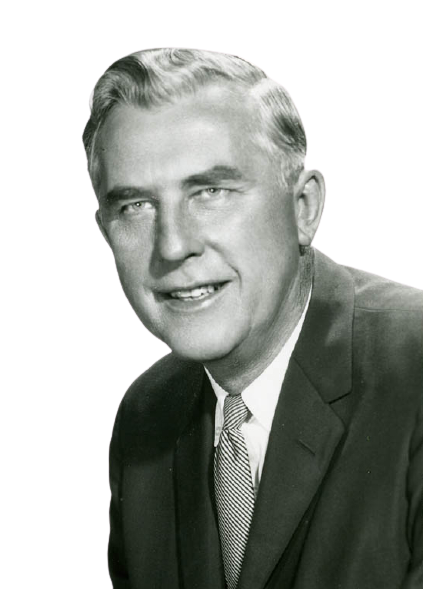
Nominee	William T. Cahill	Robert B. Meyner
Party	Republican	Democratic
Popular vote	1,411,905	911,003
Percentage	59.66%	38.49%
- County results Cahill: 50–60% 60–70% Meyner: 50–60%
Governor before election
Richard J. Hughes
Democratic
Elected Governor
William T. Cahill
Republican

The 1969 New Jersey gubernatorial election was held on November 4, 1969. Republican nominee William T. Cahill defeated Democratic nominee Robert B. Meyner with 59.66% of the vote. This was the only gubernatorial election that Republicans won between 1949 and 1981.

== Virginia ==
1969 Virginia gubernatorial election
- November 4, 1969
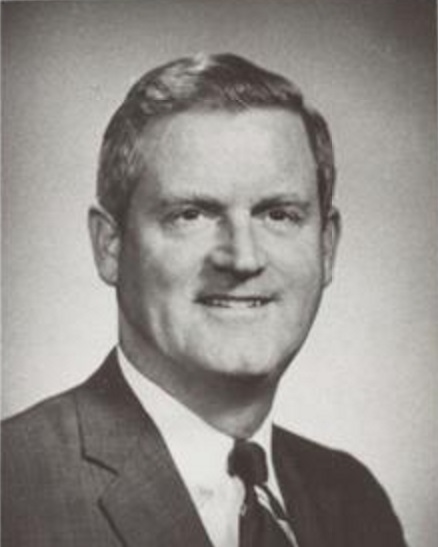

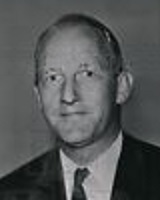
Nominee	Linwood Holton	William C. Battle
Party	Republican	Democratic
Popular vote	480,869	415,695
Percentage	52.5%	45.4%
- County and independent city results Holton: 40–50% 50–60% 60–70% 70–80% Battle: 40–50% 50–60% 60–70%
Governor before election
Mills Godwin
Democratic
Elected Governor
Linwood Holton
Republican
