= 1977 United States gubernatorial elections =

← 1976	November 8, 1977	1978 →

4 governorships 2 states; 2 territories
	Majority party	Minority party
Party	Democratic	Republican
Seats before	37	12
Seats after	37	12
Seat change	Steady	Steady
Seats up	1	1
Seats won	1	1
- Republican hold Democratic hold

United States gubernatorial elections were held November 8, 1977, in two states and two territories.

== Election results ==
State	Incumbent	Party	First elected	Result	Candidates
New Jersey	Brendan Byrne	Democratic	1973	Incumbent re-elected.	✓ Brendan Byrne (Democratic) 55.71%; Ray Bateman (Republican) 41.81%; Francis Flowers (Declare Your Independence) 0.41%
Virginia	Mills Godwin	Republican	1965 (Note: Godwin was elected to his first term as a Democrat. He won his second nonconsecutive term as a Republican.); 1969 (term-limited); 1973	Incumbent term-limited. New governor elected. Republican hold.	✓ John N. Dalton (Republican) 55.90%; Henry Howell (Democratic) 43.27%; Alan Ogden (Independent) 0.81%

== New Jersey ==
1977 New Jersey gubernatorial election
← 1973	November 8, 1977	1981 →
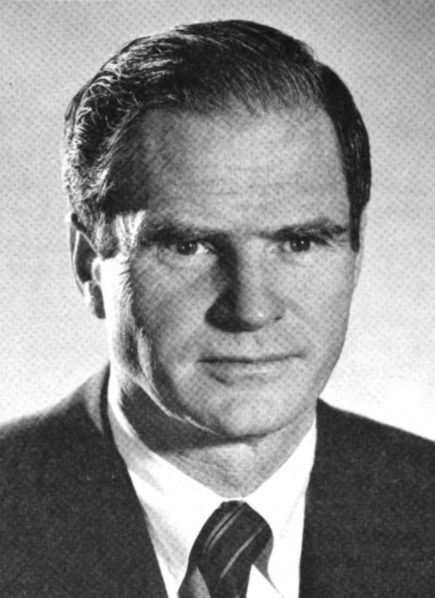

Nominee	Brendan Byrne	Raymond Bateman
Party	Democratic	Republican
Popular vote	1,184,564	888,880
Percentage	55.7%	41.8%
- Byrne: 40–50% 50–60% 60–70% 70–80% Bateman: 50–60%
Governor before election
Brendan Byrne
Democratic
Elected Governor
Brendan Byrne
Democratic

The 1977 New Jersey gubernatorial election was held on November 8, 1977. Incumbent Democratic governor Brendan Byrne defeated Republican State Senator Raymond Bateman with 55.71% of the vote.

== Virginia ==
1977 Virginia gubernatorial election
← 1973	November 8, 1977	1981 →
- Turnout: 62.7% (voting eligible)
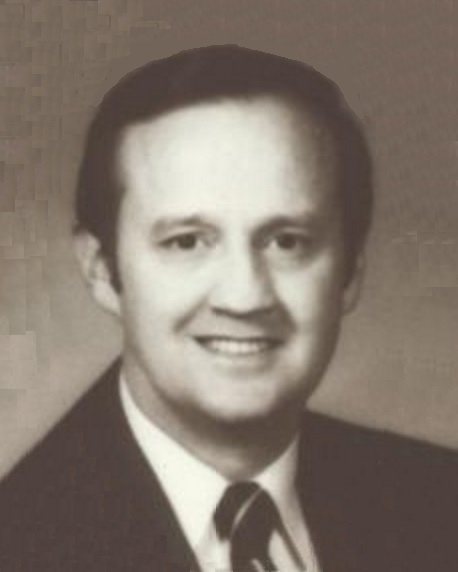

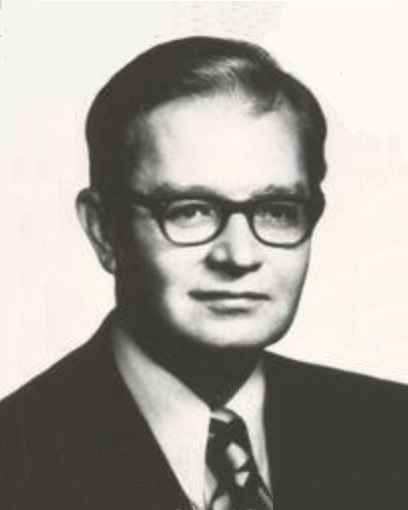
Nominee	John N. Dalton	Henry Howell
Party	Republican	Democratic
Popular vote	699,302	541,319
Percentage	55.9%	43.3%
- County and independent city results Dalton: 40–50% 50–60% 60–70% 70–80% Howell: 40–50% 50–60% 60–70% 70–80%
Governor before election
Mills E. Godwin, Jr.
Republican
Elected Governor
John N. Dalton
Republican

In the 1977 Virginia gubernatorial election, incumbent Governor Mills E. Godwin, Jr., a Republican, was unable to seek re-election due to term limits. John N. Dalton, the Lieutenant Governor of Virginia, was nominated by the Republican Party to run against the Democratic nominee, former Lieutenant Governor of Virginia Henry Howell.
