= 1969 Virginia gubernatorial election =

- November 4, 1969
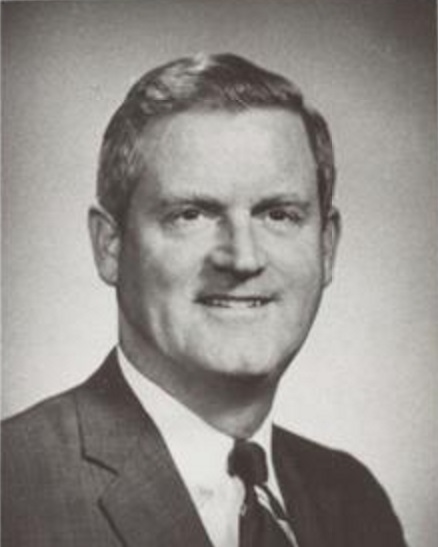

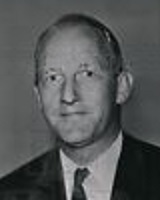
Nominee	Linwood Holton	William C. Battle
Party	Republican	Democratic
Popular vote	480,869	415,695
Percentage	52.51%	45.39%
- County and independent city results Holton: 40–50% 50–60% 60–70% 70–80% Battle: 40–50% 50–60% 60–70%
Governor before election
Mills Godwin
Democratic
Elected Governor
Linwood Holton
Republican

In the 1969 Virginia gubernatorial election, incumbent Governor Mills E. Godwin, Jr., a Democrat, was unable to seek re-election due to term limits. Godwin would later successfully run for election as a Republican in 1973.

A. Linwood Holton, Jr., an attorney from Roanoke, was nominated again by the Republican Party to run against former United States Ambassador to Australia, Democratic candidate William C. Battle.

== Background ==
During the late 1960s, Virginia politics was being radically transformed by the numerical growth of an electorate that for six decades was relatively the smallest in the nation due to cumulative poll taxes and literacy tests excluding almost all blacks and poor whites. The Twenty-Fourth Amendment, aided by subsequent drives to register blacks, and the Voting Rights Act greatly expanded Virginia's electorate. Consequently, the statewide Democratic party was severely divided into conservative, moderate and liberal factions, despite Godwin having united those factions behind him in the 1965 gubernatorial election.

=== Intractable Democratic divisions ===
By the time of the 1969 primaries, however, the divisions within the party were becoming irreconcilable. Whereas the 1965 gubernatorial primary was the first uncontested one for over half a century, each of the three factions would nominate its own candidate in 1969. Incumbent Lieutenant Governor Fred G. Pollard would be the conservative nominee, whilst the liberals nominated Henry Howell of Norfolk – long a center of liberal opposition to the Byrd machine — and the moderates descended from the "Young Turks" of the 1950s backed William C. Battle, son of a former governor.

==== Primary campaigns ====
Howell, opposed even by the relatively liberal Senator Spong, would by the first to begin his campaign in the primary during June, relying on Hubert Humphrey's support base of blacks and members of the United Mine Workers. Pollard and Battle, who announced their candidacies somewhat later, would campaign against Howell mainly in the "urban corridor" between Virginia Beach and the Washington metropolitan area. Both Pollard and Battle attacked Howell as an extremist oriented against big business, Whilst mostly focused upon their opposition to Howell, Battle reiterated his claim that Pollard was oriented toward Byrd conservatism, whilst Pollard challenged Battle on lack of experience.

Pollard's failure to win more than 23 percent of the vote in the first primary would mark the final demise of the Byrd machine within the state Democratic party. Battle continued his attacks on Howell in the runoff primary (Note: Unlike other former Confederate states, Virginia did not have a runoff primary provision until 1952, and after that it would be held only when requested.) and, aided by the endorsement of sitting Governor Godwin, managed to narrowly defeat him.

=== Weakening and splitting of conservative opposition ===
The 1965 gubernatorial election had seen the Conservative Party split from both major parties in opposition to President Johnson's civil rights and welfare programs. However, the Conservative Party's role in the demise of the Byrd machine in the 1966 Senatorial elections alienated most of its core base. Bickering within the Conservative Party, due to Virginia's unusually liberal ballot access laws (Note: Virginia as of 1968 allowed any party to qualify for ballot access in a statewide election based upon the signature of one thousand qualified voters, regardless of the total number of voters in the state.) and debates over how to nominate electors pledged to American Independent presidential nominee George Wallace, however, meant that the party was severely divided by the time of the presidential election, and by the summer of 1969 it was clear that there was no possibility of reconciliation between the two parties, especially after one member of the Conservatives alleged the American Independent Party was campaigning to elect sitting Lieutenant Governor Pollard to the governorship.

Conservative opposition to the major parties became further divided when George Walker, who sought the American Independent nomination for Governor in January, but former "states' rights" nominee and AIP state president T. Coleman Andrews said that Walker had no authority to run under the party's label soon after. In August Andrews – initially expected to run himself – would nominate William Pennington of Buckingham County as the party's candidate, whilst Walker would run as an independent.

=== GOP unites behind second-time nominee ===
Amidst the splitting of the right and of the state Democratic Party, Virginia's Republican Party, which remained under the control of moderates from the southwestern valleys, united behind 1965 nominee A. Linwood Holton at a very early stage: Holton had been nominated as early as March 1. He would be able to combine his "progressive" reputation with his ties to the Nixon administration in such a manner as to avoid alienating voters. He would focus on the putative advantages ties to Nixons' administration would provide for voters and upon Battle's connections with the liberal national Democratic party.

== Democratic nomination ==
=== Candidates ===
- William C. Battle, former U. S. Ambassador to Australia and son of former Governor John S. Battle
- Henry Howell, State Senator from Norfolk
- Fred G. Pollard, Lieutenant Governor of Virginia and former State Delegate from Richmond

=== Results ===
Primary results by county and independent city Battle: Battle 30–40%; Battle 40–50%; Battle 50–60%; Battle 60–70%; Battle 70–80%; Battle 80–90%; Battle 90–100%; Howell: Howell 30–40%; Howell 40–50%; Howell 50–60%; Howell 60–70%; Pollard: Pollard 40–50%; Pollard 50–60%; Pollard 60–70%

Democratic primary results
Party	Candidate	Votes	%
Democratic	William C. Battle	158,956	39.6%
Democratic	Henry Howell	154,617	37.0%
Democratic	Fred G. Pollard	95,057	23.4%
Total votes		408,630	100.00%

==== Primary results by county or independent city ====
1969 Virginia gubernatorial Democratic first primary by county or independent city
	William Cullen Battle Democratic		Henry Evans Howell Democratic		Frederick Gresham Pollard Democratic		Margin		Total votes cast
	#	%	#	%	#	%	#	%	Total votes cast
Accomack County	2,039	50.28%	831	20.49%	1,185	29.22%	854 (Note: In this county or city where Howell ran third behind both Battle and Pollard, margin given is Battle vote minus Pollard vote and percentage margin Battle percentage minus Pollard percentage.)	21.06%	4,055
Albemarle County	1,699	57.77%	557	18.94%	685	23.29%	1,014	34.48%	2,941
Alleghany County	394	43.54%	367	40.55%	144	15.91%	27	2.98%	905
Amelia County	152	14.76%	427	41.46%	451	43.79%	-24 (Note: In this county or city where Battle ran third behind both Howell and Pollard, margin given is Howell vote minus Pollard vote and percentage margin Howell percentage minus Pollard percentage.)	-2.33%	1,030
Amherst County	520	38.18%	451	33.11%	391	28.71%	69	5.07%	1,362
Appomattox County	314	21.61%	397	27.32%	742	51.07%	-345	-23.74%	1,453
Arlington County	4,521	37.62%	5,151	42.87%	2,344	19.51%	-630	-5.24%	12,016
Augusta County	710	49.93%	392	27.57%	320	22.50%	318	22.36%	1,422
Bath County	209	56.95%	62	16.89%	96	26.16%	113	30.79%	367
Bedford County	424	40.81%	392	37.73%	223	21.46%	32	3.08%	1,039
Bland County	170	41.16%	40	9.69%	203	49.15%	-33	-7.99%	413
Botetourt County	490	57.92%	246	29.08%	110	13.00%	244	28.84%	846
Brunswick County	473	19.89%	1,139	47.90%	766	32.21%	373	15.69%	2,378
Buchanan County	864	59.18%	80	5.48%	516	35.34%	348	23.84%	1,460
Buckingham County	323	19.27%	530	31.62%	823	49.11%	-293	-17.48%	1,676
Campbell County	642	34.15%	460	24.47%	778	41.38%	-136	-7.23%	1,880
Caroline County	431	27.58%	859	54.96%	273	17.47%	-428	-27.38%	1,563
Carroll County	716	83.26%	111	12.91%	33	3.84%	605	70.35%	860
Charles City County	60	9.00%	530	79.46%	77	11.54%	453	67.92%	667
Charlotte County	1,228	40.60%	818	27.04%	979	32.36%	249	8.23%	3,025
Chesterfield County	3,812	43.62%	2,898	33.16%	2,029	23.22%	914	10.46%	8,739
Clarke County	210	32.21%	138	21.17%	304	46.63%	-94	-14.42%	652
Craig County	169	63.30%	52	19.48%	46	17.23%	117	43.82%	267
Culpeper County	512	45.03%	225	19.79%	400	35.18%	112	9.85%	1,137
Cumberland County	282	20.70%	707	51.91%	373	27.39%	334	24.52%	1,362
Dickenson County	1,006	51.46%	324	16.57%	625	31.97%	381	19.49%	1,955
Dinwiddie County	1,223	42.38%	925	32.05%	738	25.57%	298	10.33%	2,886
Essex County	319	35.33%	373	41.31%	211	23.37%	-54	-5.98%	903
Fairfax County	7,843	36.84%	8,854	41.59%	4,592	21.57%	-1,011	-4.75%	21,289
Fauquier County	834	43.51%	497	25.93%	586	30.57%	248	12.94%	1,917
Floyd County	251	69.53%	88	24.38%	22	6.09%	163	45.15%	361
Fluvanna County	221	54.84%	94	23.33%	88	21.84%	127	31.51%	403
Franklin County	1,634	72.21%	350	15.47%	279	12.33%	1,284	56.74%	2,263
Frederick County	594	37.43%	647	40.77%	346	21.80%	-53	-3.34%	1,587
Giles County	1,031	71.65%	238	16.54%	170	11.81%	793	55.11%	1,439
Gloucester County	894	50.20%	541	30.38%	346	19.43%	353	19.82%	1,781
Goochland County	367	25.22%	657	45.15%	431	29.62%	226	15.53%	1,455
Grayson County	857	85.44%	74	7.38%	72	7.18%	783	78.07%	1,003
Greene County	166	61.48%	67	24.81%	37	13.70%	99	36.67%	270
Greensville County	435	24.63%	796	45.07%	535	30.29%	261	14.78%	1,766
Halifax County	1,572	47.46%	583	17.60%	1,157	34.93%	415	12.53%	3,312
Hanover County	1,189	37.16%	1,006	31.44%	1,005	31.41%	183	5.72%	3,200
Henrico County	8,242	45.51%	4,657	25.71%	5,213	28.78%	3,029	16.72%	18,112
Henry County	1,185	46.80%	766	30.25%	581	22.95%	419	16.55%	2,532
Highland County	90	60.81%	18	12.16%	40	27.03%	50	33.78%	148
Isle of Wight County	892	34.84%	1,172	45.78%	496	19.38%	-280	-10.94%	2,560
James City County	466	39.39%	499	42.18%	218	18.43%	-33	-2.79%	1,183
King and Queen County	208	28.03%	379	51.08%	155	20.89%	-171	-23.05%	742
King George County	125	33.97%	146	39.67%	97	26.36%	-21	-5.71%	368
King William County	239	25.48%	434	46.27%	265	28.25%	169	18.02%	938
Lancaster County	502	35.15%	488	34.17%	438	30.67%	14	0.98%	1,428
Lee County	1,462	93.54%	46	2.94%	55	3.52%	1,407	90.02%	1,563
Loudoun County	1,122	41.52%	614	22.72%	966	35.75%	156	5.77%	2,702
Louisa County	460	38.82%	422	35.61%	303	25.57%	38	3.21%	1,185
Lunenburg County	415	34.02%	462	37.87%	343	28.11%	-47	-3.85%	1,220
Madison County	394	47.87%	101	12.27%	328	39.85%	66	8.02%	823
Mathews County	303	44.76%	230	33.97%	144	21.27%	73	10.78%	677
Mecklenburg County	921	32.54%	1,020	36.04%	889	31.41%	-99	-3.50%	2,830
Middlesex County	346	40.05%	213	24.65%	305	35.30%	41	4.75%	864
Montgomery County	1,051	54.80%	550	28.68%	317	16.53%	501	26.12%	1,918
Nansemond County	1,553	37.95%	2,016	49.27%	523	12.78%	-463	-11.31%	4,092
Nelson County	657	58.50%	235	20.93%	231	20.57%	422	37.58%	1,123
New Kent County	136	30.84%	216	48.98%	89	20.18%	-80	-18.14%	441
Northampton County	565	34.28%	640	38.83%	443	26.88%	-75	-4.55%	1,648
Northumberland County	247	30.46%	373	45.99%	191	23.55%	-126	-15.54%	811
Nottoway County	852	46.41%	627	34.15%	357	19.44%	225	12.25%	1,836
Orange County	389	38.21%	184	18.07%	445	43.71%	-56	-5.50%	1,018
Page County	555	47.40%	276	23.57%	340	29.04%	215	18.36%	1,171
Patrick County	763	72.19%	108	10.22%	186	17.60%	577	54.59%	1,057
Pittsylvania County	3,614	40.28%	1,712	19.08%	3,647	40.64%	-33	-0.37%	8,973
Powhatan County	170	20.68%	471	57.30%	181	22.02%	290	35.28%	822
Prince Edward County	1,535	54.11%	491	17.31%	811	28.59%	724	25.52%	2,837
Prince George County	569	34.30%	754	45.45%	336	20.25%	-185	-11.15%	1,659
Prince William County	1,289	37.30%	1,059	30.64%	1,108	32.06%	181	5.24%	3,456
Pulaski County	1,056	50.94%	730	35.21%	287	13.84%	326	15.73%	2,073
Rappahannock County	156	36.28%	100	23.26%	174	40.47%	-18	-4.19%	430
Richmond County	203	38.01%	109	20.41%	222	41.57%	-19	-3.56%	534
Roanoke County	1,817	48.27%	1,311	34.83%	636	16.90%	506	13.44%	3,764
Rockbridge County	404	58.64%	149	21.63%	136	19.74%	255	37.01%	689
Rockingham County	829	58.55%	316	22.32%	271	19.14%	513	36.23%	1,416
Russell County	1,349	82.26%	129	7.87%	162	9.88%	1,187	72.38%	1,640
Scott County	768	84.86%	97	10.72%	40	4.42%	671	74.14%	905
Shenandoah County	611	57.97%	226	21.44%	217	20.59%	385	36.53%	1,054
Smyth County	687	61.61%	237	21.26%	191	17.13%	450	40.36%	1,115
Southampton County	902	42.33%	700	32.85%	529	24.82%	202	9.48%	2,131
Spotsylvania County	758	28.01%	1,600	59.13%	348	12.86%	-842	-31.12%	2,706
Stafford County	916	34.74%	1,318	49.98%	403	15.28%	-402	-15.24%	2,637
Surrey County	351	24.43%	712	49.55%	374	26.03%	338	23.52%	1,437
Sussex County	783	29.49%	1,042	39.25%	830	31.26%	212	7.98%	2,655
Tazewell County	1,174	36.28%	989	30.56%	1,073	33.16%	101	3.12%	3,236
Warren County	720	40.47%	763	42.89%	296	16.64%	-43	-2.42%	1,779
Washington County	984	57.38%	322	18.78%	409	23.85%	575	33.53%	1,715
Westmoreland County	341	36.05%	339	35.84%	266	28.12%	2	0.21%	946
Wise County	1,835	80.73%	186	8.18%	252	11.09%	1,583	69.64%	2,273
Wythe County	604	45.62%	191	14.43%	529	39.95%	75	5.66%	1,324
York County	980	39.44%	1,064	42.82%	441	17.75%	-84	-3.38%	2,485
Alexandria City	2,791	32.67%	3,599	42.13%	2,152	25.19%	-808	-9.46%	8,542
Bedford City	191	44.94%	132	31.06%	102	24.00%	59	13.88%	425
Bristol City	893	70.48%	145	11.44%	229	18.07%	664	52.41%	1,267
Buena Vista City	142	49.31%	70	24.31%	76	26.39%	66	22.92%	288
Charlottesville City	2,544	52.48%	1,432	29.54%	872	17.99%	1,112	22.94%	4,848
Chesapeake City	2,155	24.87%	4,713	54.38%	1,798	20.75%	-2,558	-29.52%	8,666
Clifton Forge City	272	52.31%	166	31.92%	82	15.77%	106	20.38%	520
Colonial Heights City	869	50.91%	303	17.75%	535	31.34%	334	19.57%	1,707
Covington City	444	39.12%	495	43.61%	196	17.27%	-51	-4.49%	1,135
Danville City	3,318	38.51%	2,191	25.43%	3,106	36.05%	212	2.46%	8,615
Emporia City	414	29.28%	423	29.92%	577	40.81%	-154	-10.89%	1,414
Fairfax City	393	29.80%	535	40.56%	391	29.64%	-142	-10.77%	1,319
Falls Church City	322	32.14%	428	42.71%	252	25.15%	-106	-10.58%	1,002
Franklin City	308	33.66%	315	34.43%	292	31.91%	-7	-0.77%	915
Fredericksburg City	957	35.55%	1,171	43.50%	564	20.95%	-214	-7.95%	2,692
Galax City	285	71.97%	35	8.84%	76	19.19%	209	52.78%	396
Hampton City	3,843	31.26%	6,704	54.53%	1,748	14.22%	-2,861	-23.27%	12,295
Harrisonburg City	433	56.60%	80	10.46%	252	32.94%	181	23.66%	765
Hopewell City	926	44.24%	654	31.25%	513	24.51%	272	13.00%	2,093
Lexington City	309	54.02%	122	21.33%	141	24.65%	168	29.37%	572
Lynchburg City	952	27.90%	1,300	38.10%	1,160	34.00%	140	4.10%	3,412
Martinsville City	935	43.73%	691	32.32%	512	23.95%	244	11.41%	2,138
Newport News City	4,492	37.28%	5,587	46.37%	1,971	16.36%	-1,095	-9.09%	12,050
Norfolk City	10,206	32.46%	17,030	54.17%	4,201	13.36%	-6,824	-21.71%	31,437
Norton City	219	68.44%	28	8.75%	73	22.81%	146	45.63%	320
Petersburg City	1,689	28.01%	3,030	50.24%	1,312	21.75%	-1,341	-22.24%	6,031
Portsmouth City	5,509	33.66%	8,840	54.01%	2,017	12.32%	-3,331	-20.35%	16,366
Radford City	512	59.12%	285	32.91%	69	7.97%	227	26.21%	866
Richmond City	8,906	26.32%	16,206	47.90%	8,724	25.78%	-7,300	-21.57%	33,836
Roanoke City	2,825	44.27%	2,396	37.55%	1,160	18.18%	429	6.72%	6,381
Salem City	473	38.80%	421	34.54%	325	26.66%	52	4.27%	1,219
Staunton City	656	46.76%	322	22.95%	425	30.29%	231	16.46%	1,403
South Boston City	647	53.92%	117	9.75%	436	36.33%	211	17.58%	1,200
Suffolk City	980	49.02%	553	27.66%	466	23.31%	427	21.36%	1,999
Virginia Beach City	5,351	37.13%	5,332	37.00%	3,728	25.87%	19	0.13%	14,411
Waynesboro City	450	56.39%	169	21.18%	179	22.43%	271	33.96%	798
Williamsburg City	465	48.59%	266	27.80%	226	23.62%	199	20.79%	957
Winchester City	535	39.81%	348	25.89%	461	34.30%	74	5.51%	1,344
Totals	158,956	38.90%	154,617	37.84%	95,057	23.26%	4,339	!1.06%	408,630

=== Runoff results ===
Runoff primary results by county and independent city Battle: Battle 50–60%; Battle 60–70%; Battle 70–80%; Battle 80–90%; Battle 90–100%; Howell: Howell 50–60%; Howell 60–70%; Howell 70–80%; Howell 80–90%; Howell 90–100%; Tie: Tie 50%

Democratic runoff primary results
Party	Candidate	Votes	%
Democratic	William C. Battle	226,108	51.7%
Democratic	Henry Howell	207,505	48.3%
Total votes		433,613	100.00%

==== Runoff results by county or independent city ====
1969 Virginia gubernatorial Democratic runoff primary by county or independent city
	William Cullen Battle Democratic		Henry Evans Howell Democratic		Margin		Total votes cast
	#	%	#	%	#	%	Total votes cast
Accomack County	2,387	60.75%	1,542	39.25%	845	21.51%	3,929
Albemarle County	2,098	67.74%	999	32.26%	1,099	35.49%	3,097
Alleghany County	469	40.50%	689	59.50%	-220	-19.00%	1,158
Amelia County	514	51.66%	481	48.34%	33	3.32%	995
Amherst County	827	53.98%	705	46.02%	122	7.96%	1,532
Appomattox County	1,254	71.53%	499	28.47%	755	43.07%	1,753
Arlington County	7,101	54.28%	5,980	45.72%	1,121	8.57%	13,081
Augusta County	1,082	57.49%	800	42.51%	282	14.98%	1,882
Bath County	321	71.49%	128	28.51%	193	42.98%	449
Bedford County	640	48.71%	674	51.29%	-34	-2.59%	1,314
Bland County	316	76.51%	97	23.49%	219	53.03%	413
Botetourt County	590	55.50%	473	44.50%	117	11.01%	1,063
Brunswick County	1,129	47.14%	1,266	52.86%	-137	-5.72%	2,395
Buchanan County	1,623	87.68%	228	12.32%	1,395	75.36%	1,851
Buckingham County	840	56.11%	657	43.89%	183	12.22%	1,497
Campbell County	1,196	62.39%	721	37.61%	475	24.78%	1,917
Caroline County	726	37.06%	1,233	62.94%	-507	-25.88%	1,959
Carroll County	966	84.00%	184	16.00%	782	68.00%	1,150
Charles City County	123	11.99%	903	88.01%	-780	-76.02%	1,026
Charlotte County	880	57.59%	648	42.41%	232	15.18%	1,528
Chesterfield County	5,843	56.54%	4,491	43.46%	1,352	13.08%	10,334
Clarke County	616	70.72%	255	29.28%	361	41.45%	871
Craig County	229	69.18%	102	30.82%	127	38.37%	331
Culpeper County	930	67.29%	452	32.71%	478	34.59%	1,382
Cumberland County	489	39.72%	742	60.28%	-253	-20.55%	1,231
Dickenson County	1,755	77.18%	519	22.82%	1,236	54.35%	2,274
Dinwiddie County	1,443	56.26%	1,122	43.74%	321	12.51%	2,565
Essex County	635	54.37%	533	45.63%	102	8.73%	1,168
Fairfax County	12,224	50.46%	12,002	49.54%	222	0.92%	24,226
Fauquier County	1,275	59.75%	859	40.25%	416	19.49%	2,134
Floyd County	343	65.21%	183	34.79%	160	30.42%	526
Fluvanna County	295	63.71%	168	36.29%	127	27.43%	463
Franklin County	1,785	76.87%	537	23.13%	1,248	53.75%	2,322
Frederick County	1,000	49.14%	1,035	50.86%	-35	-1.72%	2,035
Giles County	1,341	71.71%	529	28.29%	812	43.42%	1,870
Gloucester County	814	54.41%	682	45.59%	132	8.82%	1,496
Goochland County	920	49.78%	928	50.22%	-8	-0.43%	1,848
Grayson County	1,186	88.24%	158	11.76%	1,028	76.49%	1,344
Greene County	206	65.40%	109	34.60%	97	30.79%	315
Greensville County	552	35.66%	996	64.34%	-444	-28.68%	1,548
Halifax County	2,421	76.98%	724	23.02%	1,697	53.96%	3,145
Hanover County	1,965	56.21%	1,531	43.79%	434	12.41%	3,496
Henrico County	11,769	66.20%	6,009	33.80%	5,760	32.40%	17,778
Henry County	1,849	53.67%	1,596	46.33%	253	7.34%	3,445
Highland County	148	79.14%	39	20.86%	109	58.29%	187
Isle of Wight County	1,186	45.34%	1,430	54.66%	-244	-9.33%	2,616
James City County	656	43.79%	842	56.21%	-186	-12.42%	1,498
King and Queen County	338	41.73%	472	58.27%	-134	-16.54%	810
King George County	222	45.87%	262	54.13%	-40	-8.26%	484
King William County	552	50.18%	548	49.82%	4	0.36%	1,100
Lancaster County	924	55.97%	727	44.03%	197	11.93%	1,651
Lee County	2,000	96.85%	65	3.15%	1,935	93.70%	2,065
Loudoun County	1,738	63.76%	988	36.24%	750	27.51%	2,726
Louisa County	703	52.78%	629	47.22%	74	5.56%	1,332
Lunenburg County	768	55.13%	625	44.87%	143	10.27%	1,393
Madison County	479	67.75%	228	32.25%	251	35.50%	707
Mathews County	404	53.44%	352	46.56%	52	6.88%	756
Mecklenburg County	1,628	54.32%	1,369	45.68%	259	8.64%	2,997
Middlesex County	485	64.93%	262	35.07%	223	29.85%	747
Montgomery County	1,436	64.37%	795	35.63%	641	28.73%	2,231
Nansemond County	1,638	39.99%	2,458	60.01%	-820	-20.02%	4,096
Nelson County	677	60.45%	443	39.55%	234	20.89%	1,120
New Kent County	245	43.29%	321	56.71%	-76	-13.43%	566
Northampton County	908	55.16%	738	44.84%	170	10.33%	1,646
Northumberland County	505	45.33%	609	54.67%	-104	-9.34%	1,114
Nottoway County	1,168	56.95%	883	43.05%	285	13.90%	2,051
Orange County	767	62.56%	459	37.44%	308	25.12%	1,226
Page County	1,263	75.13%	418	24.87%	845	50.27%	1,681
Patrick County	1,587	88.07%	215	11.93%	1,372	76.14%	1,802
Pittsylvania County	3,495	64.72%	1,905	35.28%	1,590	29.44%	5,400
Powhatan County	359	35.76%	645	64.24%	-286	-28.49%	1,004
Prince Edward County	1,671	68.43%	771	31.57%	900	36.86%	2,442
Prince George County	771	44.70%	954	55.30%	-183	-10.61%	1,725
Prince William County	2,029	57.11%	1,524	42.89%	505	14.21%	3,553
Pulaski County	1,628	60.63%	1,057	39.37%	571	21.27%	2,685
Rappahannock County	240	57.01%	181	42.99%	59	14.01%	421
Richmond County	444	61.75%	275	38.25%	169	23.50%	719
Roanoke County	2,059	52.27%	1,880	47.73%	179	4.54%	3,939
Rockbridge County	511	65.51%	269	34.49%	242	31.03%	780
Rockingham County	1,294	65.85%	671	34.15%	623	31.70%	1,965
Russell County	1,943	88.76%	246	11.24%	1,697	77.52%	2,189
Scott County	1,043	83.78%	202	16.22%	841	67.55%	1,245
Shenandoah County	1,010	72.77%	378	27.23%	632	45.53%	1,388
Smyth County	971	66.55%	488	33.45%	483	33.10%	1,459
Southampton County	1,282	54.09%	1,088	45.91%	194	8.19%	2,370
Spotsylvania County	681	28.89%	1,676	71.11%	-995	-42.21%	2,357
Stafford County	737	33.08%	1,491	66.92%	-754	-33.84%	2,228
Surry County	505	42.76%	676	57.24%	-171	-14.48%	1,181
Sussex County	1,132	50.16%	1,125	49.84%	7	0.31%	2,257
Tazewell County	1,001	47.22%	1,119	52.78%	-118	-5.57%	2,120
Warren County	1,066	48.90%	1,114	51.10%	-48	-2.20%	2,180
Washington County	1,652	75.68%	531	24.32%	1,121	51.35%	2,183
Westmoreland County	528	48.13%	569	51.87%	-41	-3.74%	1,097
Wise County	3,047	87.01%	455	12.99%	2,592	74.01%	3,502
Wythe County	1,239	78.22%	345	21.78%	894	56.44%	1,584
York County	1,298	44.42%	1,624	55.58%	-326	-11.16%	2,922
Alexandria City	3,841	45.46%	4,609	54.54%	-768	-9.09%	8,450
Bedford City	320	61.42%	201	38.58%	119	22.84%	521
Bristol City	1,125	82.90%	232	17.10%	893	65.81%	1,357
Buena Vista City	213	63.20%	124	36.80%	89	26.41%	337
Charlottesville City	2,911	56.79%	2,215	43.21%	696	13.58%	5,126
Chesapeake City	3,979	36.64%	6,881	63.36%	-2,902	-26.72%	10,860
Clifton Forge City	357	56.67%	273	43.33%	84	13.33%	630
Colonial Heights City	1,210	67.18%	591	32.82%	619	34.37%	1,801
Covington City	503	37.62%	834	62.38%	-331	-24.76%	1,337
Danville City	4,756	64.86%	2,577	35.14%	2,179	29.71%	7,333
Emporia City	624	52.93%	555	47.07%	69	5.85%	1,179
Fairfax City	830	54.61%	690	45.39%	140	9.21%	1,520
Falls Church City	565	50.00%	565	50.00%	0	0.00%	1,130
Franklin City	590	58.36%	421	41.64%	169	16.72%	1,011
Fredericksburg City	1,084	44.92%	1,329	55.08%	-245	-10.15%	2,413
Galax City	525	88.09%	71	11.91%	454	76.17%	596
Hampton City	4,897	36.40%	8,558	63.60%	-3,661	-27.21%	13,455
Harrisonburg City	717	76.68%	218	23.32%	499	53.37%	935
Hopewell City	1,240	51.28%	1,178	48.72%	62	2.56%	2,418
Lexington City	384	68.94%	173	31.06%	211	37.88%	557
Lynchburg City	2,160	54.67%	1,791	45.33%	369	9.34%	3,951
Martinsville City	1,453	55.76%	1,153	44.24%	300	11.51%	2,606
Newport News City	5,886	44.90%	7,223	55.10%	-1,337	-10.20%	13,109
Norfolk City	11,113	34.83%	20,789	65.17%	-9,676	-30.33%	31,902
Norton City	292	87.43%	42	12.57%	250	74.85%	334
Petersburg City	2,684	42.19%	3,677	57.81%	-993	-15.61%	6,361
Portsmouth City	7,058	38.83%	11,118	61.17%	-4,060	-22.34%	18,176
Radford City	665	60.45%	435	39.55%	230	20.91%	1,100
Richmond City	13,524	41.99%	18,680	58.01%	-5,156	-16.01%	32,204
Roanoke City	4,094	50.04%	4,088	49.96%	6	0.07%	8,182
South Boston City	946	79.70%	241	20.30%	705	59.39%	1,187
Salem City	738	50.86%	713	49.14%	25	1.72%	1,451
Staunton City	1,184	65.49%	624	34.51%	560	30.97%	1,808
Suffolk City	1,123	65.40%	594	34.60%	529	30.81%	1,717
Virginia Beach City	7,207	46.86%	8,173	53.14%	-966	-6.28%	15,380
Waynesboro City	661	63.07%	387	36.93%	274	26.15%	1,048
Williamsburg City	632	60.83%	407	39.17%	225	21.66%	1,039
Winchester City	989	67.79%	470	32.21%	519	35.57%	1,459
Totals	226,108	52.15%	207,505	47.85%	18,603	4.29%	433,613

== General election ==
=== Candidates ===
- William C. Battle, former U. S. Ambassador to Australia and son of former Governor John S. Battle (Democratic)
- Linwood Holton, Roanoke attorney (Republican)
- Rev. Beverly McDowell, Richmond pastor (Conservative)
- William Pennington, Buckingham County physician (American Independent)
- George Walker, retired Navy officer from Portsmouth (Independent)

=== Results ===
1969 Virginia gubernatorial election
Party	Candidate	Votes	%	±%
Republican	A. Linwood Holton, Jr.	480,869	52.51%	+14.80%
Democratic	William C. Battle	415,695	45.39%	−2.50%
Conservative	Beverly McDowell	10,596	1.16%	−12.22%
American Independent	William Pennington	7,382	0.81%	+0.81%
Independent	George Walker	1,182	0.13%	
Write-ins		317	<0.01%	
Majority		65,174	7.12%	−7.86%
Turnout		915,764		
Republican gain from Democratic		Swing		

==== Results by county or independent city ====
1969 Virginia gubernatorial election by county or independent city
	Abner Linwood Holton jr. Republican		William C. Battle Democratic		Beverley B. McDowell Virginia Conservative		William A. Pennington American Independent		George R. Walker Independent		Various candidates Write-ins		Margin		Total votes cast
	#	%	#	%	#	%	#	%	#	%	#	%	#	%	Total votes cast
Accomack County	3,188	48.25%	3,207	48.54%	201	3.04%	8	0.12%	3	0.05%			-19	-0.29%	6,607
Albemarle County	3,001	48.05%	3,136	50.22%	50	0.80%	52	0.83%	6	0.10%			-135	-2.16%	6,245
Alleghany County	1,312	51.37%	1,224	47.92%	7	0.27%	10	0.39%	1	0.04%			88	3.45%	2,554
Amelia County	692	40.97%	841	49.79%	123	7.28%	26	1.54%	7	0.41%			-149	-8.82%	1,689
Amherst County	2,100	46.12%	2,264	49.73%	23	0.51%	159	3.49%	7	0.15%			-164	-3.60%	4,553
Appomattox County	1,072	37.13%	1,719	59.54%	9	0.31%	86	2.98%	1	0.03%			-647	-22.41%	2,887
Arlington County	18,418	50.51%	17,097	46.89%	702	1.93%	191	0.52%	51	0.14%	2	0.01%	1,321	3.62%	36,461
Augusta County	4,992	67.26%	2,365	31.86%	56	0.75%	6	0.08%	3	0.04%			2,627	35.39%	7,422
Bath County	547	47.28%	602	52.03%	0	0.00%	8	0.69%	0	0.00%			-55	-4.75%	1,157
Bedford County	2,254	48.45%	1,934	41.57%	91	1.96%	358	7.70%	15	0.32%			320	6.88%	4,652
Bland County	764	51.80%	702	47.59%	3	0.20%	1	0.07%	5	0.34%			62	4.20%	1,475
Botetourt County	2,244	58.27%	1,571	40.79%	4	0.10%	31	0.80%	1	0.03%			673	17.48%	3,851
Brunswick County	1,280	38.55%	1,776	53.49%	188	5.66%	68	2.05%	8	0.24%			-496	-14.94%	3,320
Buchanan County	3,379	43.78%	4,184	54.20%	103	1.33%	39	0.51%	14	0.18%			-805	-10.43%	7,719
Buckingham County	725	29.06%	1,319	52.87%	7	0.28%	442	17.72%	2	0.08%			-594	-23.81%	2,495
Campbell County	3,494	53.93%	2,436	37.60%	303	4.68%	231	3.57%	15	0.23%			1,058	16.33%	6,479
Caroline County	1,025	39.32%	1,530	58.69%	35	1.34%	14	0.54%	3	0.12%			-505	-19.37%	2,607
Carroll County	3,879	65.61%	1,988	33.63%	14	0.24%	18	0.30%	13	0.22%			1,891	31.99%	5,912
Charles City County	340	26.84%	911	71.90%	4	0.32%	8	0.63%	4	0.32%			-571	-45.07%	1,267
Charlotte County	988	41.22%	1,309	54.61%	21	0.88%	75	3.13%	4	0.17%			-321	-13.39%	2,397
Chesterfield County	17,261	67.46%	7,694	30.07%	419	1.64%	189	0.74%	24	0.09%			9,567	37.39%	25,587
Clarke County	853	46.28%	980	53.17%	3	0.16%	7	0.38%	0	0.00%			-127	-6.89%	1,843
Craig County	480	46.78%	543	52.92%	0	0.00%	3	0.29%	0	0.00%			-63	-6.14%	1,026
Culpeper County	1,642	50.32%	1,564	47.93%	7	0.21%	36	1.10%	14	0.43%			78	2.39%	3,263
Cumberland County	650	34.50%	1,173	62.26%	24	1.27%	31	1.65%	6	0.32%			-523	-27.76%	1,884
Dickenson County	3,377	51.54%	3,141	47.94%	12	0.18%	9	0.14%	13	0.20%			236	3.60%	6,552
Dinwiddie County	1,225	34.46%	2,172	61.10%	95	2.67%	56	1.58%	7	0.20%			-947	-26.64%	3,555
Essex County	555	38.78%	846	59.12%	5	0.35%	19	1.33%	6	0.42%			-291	-20.34%	1,431
Fairfax County	37,932	54.97%	30,370	44.01%	310	0.45%	363	0.53%	36	0.05%			7,562	10.96%	69,011
Fauquier County	2,345	48.85%	2,403	50.06%	15	0.31%	28	0.58%	9	0.19%			-58	-1.21%	4,800
Floyd County	1,607	67.15%	778	32.51%	3	0.13%	5	0.21%	0	0.00%			829	34.64%	2,393
Fluvanna County	620	52.23%	532	44.82%	12	1.01%	23	1.94%	0	0.00%			88	7.41%	1,187
Franklin County	2,018	40.53%	2,887	57.98%	8	0.16%	59	1.18%	7	0.14%			-869	-17.45%	4,979
Frederick County	3,553	65.60%	1,799	33.22%	16	0.30%	22	0.41%	26	0.48%			1,754	32.39%	5,416
Giles County	2,036	42.51%	2,660	55.54%	59	1.23%	25	0.52%	9	0.19%			-624	-13.03%	4,789
Gloucester County	1,599	52.27%	1,384	45.24%	58	1.90%	17	0.56%	1	0.03%			215	7.03%	3,059
Goochland County	1,023	38.37%	1,578	59.19%	28	1.05%	26	0.98%	9	0.34%	2	0.08%	-555	-20.82%	2,666
Grayson County	2,957	54.58%	2,442	45.07%	10	0.18%	6	0.11%	3	0.06%			515	9.51%	5,418
Greene County	699	59.90%	455	38.99%	4	0.34%	7	0.60%	2	0.17%			244	20.91%	1,167
Greensville County	803	39.38%	1,159	56.84%	46	2.26%	25	1.23%	6	0.29%			-356	-17.46%	2,039
Halifax County	2,361	45.38%	2,732	52.51%	30	0.58%	71	1.36%	9	0.17%			-371	-7.13%	5,203
Hanover County	4,593	61.87%	2,623	35.33%	138	1.86%	63	0.85%	7	0.09%			1,970	26.54%	7,424
Henrico County	25,779	65.78%	12,579	32.10%	625	1.59%	193	0.49%	8	0.02%	6	0.02%	13,200	33.68%	39,190
Henry County	3,139	44.98%	3,739	53.58%	23	0.33%	62	0.89%	16	0.23%			-600	-8.60%	6,979
Highland County	498	62.09%	301	37.53%	0	0.00%	0	0.00%	3	0.37%			197	24.56%	802
Isle of Wight County	2,199	56.11%	1,576	40.21%	75	1.91%	59	1.51%	10	0.26%			623	15.90%	3,919
James City County	1,416	48.51%	1,431	49.02%	46	1.58%	23	0.79%	3	0.10%			-15	-0.51%	2,919
King and Queen County	497	38.17%	766	58.83%	30	2.30%	5	0.38%	4	0.31%			-269	-20.66%	1,302
King George County	771	51.92%	702	47.27%	5	0.34%	7	0.47%	0	0.00%			69	4.65%	1,485
King William County	884	46.36%	979	51.34%	35	1.84%	5	0.26%	4	0.21%			-95	-4.98%	1,907
Lancaster County	1,382	49.84%	1,352	48.76%	21	0.76%	17	0.61%	1	0.04%			30	1.08%	2,773
Lee County	3,875	46.14%	4,455	53.05%	31	0.37%	18	0.21%	19	0.23%			-580	-6.91%	8,398
Loudoun County	3,190	46.49%	3,621	52.77%	11	0.16%	36	0.52%	4	0.06%			-431	-6.28%	6,862
Louisa County	1,303	49.43%	1,260	47.80%	42	1.59%	29	1.10%	2	0.08%			43	1.63%	2,636
Lunenburg County	1,221	47.14%	1,154	44.56%	101	3.90%	111	4.29%	3	0.12%			67	2.59%	2,590
Madison County	1,164	60.82%	725	37.88%	7	0.37%	17	0.89%	1	0.05%			439	22.94%	1,914
Mathews County	1,153	58.68%	784	39.90%	14	0.71%	9	0.46%	5	0.25%			369	18.78%	1,965
Mecklenburg County	2,480	40.91%	3,347	55.21%	96	1.58%	125	2.06%	14	0.23%			-867	-14.30%	6,062
Middlesex County	833	53.95%	669	43.33%	31	2.01%	10	0.65%	1	0.06%			164	10.62%	1,544
Montgomery County	5,107	61.68%	3,151	38.06%	11	0.13%	10	0.12%	1	0.01%			1,956	23.62%	8,280
Nansemond County	3,089	48.69%	3,084	48.61%	30	0.47%	135	2.13%	6	0.09%			5	0.08%	6,344
Nelson County	713	38.07%	1,116	59.58%	9	0.48%	32	1.71%	3	0.16%			-403	-21.52%	1,873
New Kent County	572	47.12%	593	48.85%	24	1.98%	25	2.06%	0	0.00%			-21	-1.73%	1,214
Northampton County	1,390	46.88%	1,541	51.97%	26	0.88%	8	0.27%	0	0.00%			-151	-5.09%	2,965
Northumberland County	1,172	53.71%	988	45.28%	14	0.64%	7	0.32%	1	0.05%			184	8.43%	2,182
Nottoway County	1,551	46.24%	1,680	50.09%	85	2.53%	33	0.98%	5	0.15%			-129	-3.85%	3,354
Orange County	1,529	57.39%	1,095	41.10%	20	0.75%	19	0.71%	1	0.04%			434	16.29%	2,664
Page County	2,682	53.43%	2,306	45.94%	20	0.40%	8	0.16%	4	0.08%			376	7.49%	5,020
Patrick County	1,759	46.44%	1,981	52.30%	9	0.24%	34	0.90%	5	0.13%			-222	-5.86%	3,788
Pittsylvania County	4,215	43.90%	5,250	54.68%	28	0.29%	80	0.83%	29	0.30%			-1,035	-10.78%	9,602
Powhatan County	912	41.91%	1,121	51.52%	48	2.21%	91	4.18%	4	0.18%			-209	-9.60%	2,176
Prince Edward County	1,783	48.24%	1,840	49.78%	37	1.00%	31	0.84%	5	0.14%			-57	-1.54%	3,696
Prince George County	1,249	46.66%	1,350	50.43%	55	2.05%	22	0.82%	1	0.04%			-101	-3.77%	2,677
Prince William County	6,004	52.65%	5,246	46.01%	21	0.18%	115	1.01%	17	0.15%			758	6.65%	11,403
Pulaski County	3,562	50.91%	3,399	48.58%	8	0.11%	21	0.30%	6	0.09%			163	2.33%	6,996
Rappahannock County	596	45.95%	688	53.05%	5	0.39%	6	0.46%	2	0.15%			-92	-7.09%	1,297
Richmond County	831	59.15%	559	39.79%	10	0.71%	5	0.36%	0	0.00%			272	19.36%	1,405
Roanoke County	12,124	64.12%	6,562	34.70%	22	0.12%	188	0.99%	11	0.06%	1	0.01%	5,562	29.42%	18,908
Rockbridge County	1,450	59.55%	957	39.30%	8	0.33%	16	0.66%	4	0.16%			493	20.25%	2,435
Rockingham County	5,481	67.92%	2,545	31.54%	19	0.24%	16	0.20%	9	0.11%			2,936	36.38%	8,070
Russell County	3,261	47.77%	3,438	50.36%	98	1.44%	17	0.25%	13	0.19%			-177	-2.59%	6,827
Scott County	3,869	54.19%	3,189	44.66%	24	0.34%	20	0.28%	38	0.53%			680	9.52%	7,140
Shenandoah County	4,528	66.20%	2,282	33.36%	13	0.19%	11	0.16%	6	0.09%			2,246	32.84%	6,840
Smyth County	4,212	58.23%	2,988	41.31%	8	0.11%	15	0.21%	10	0.14%			1,224	16.92%	7,233
Southampton County	1,393	40.55%	1,963	57.15%	46	1.34%	27	0.79%	6	0.17%			-570	-16.59%	3,435
Spotsylvania County	1,669	41.58%	2,153	53.64%	138	3.44%	24	0.60%	30	0.75%			-484	-12.06%	4,014
Stafford County	2,354	51.20%	2,212	48.11%	13	0.28%	3	0.07%	16	0.35%			142	3.09%	4,598
Surry County	556	33.72%	1,061	64.34%	16	0.97%	12	0.73%	4	0.24%			-505	-30.62%	1,649
Sussex County	1,577	53.40%	1,269	42.97%	42	1.42%	64	2.17%	1	0.03%			308	10.43%	2,953
Tazewell County	3,612	45.62%	4,186	52.87%	69	0.87%	23	0.29%	27	0.34%			-574	-7.25%	7,917
Warren County	2,102	50.76%	1,977	47.74%	25	0.60%	28	0.68%	9	0.22%			125	3.02%	4,141
Washington County	4,680	52.74%	4,138	46.64%	20	0.23%	23	0.26%	12	0.14%			542	6.11%	8,873
Westmoreland County	1,036	49.45%	1,040	49.64%	8	0.38%	10	0.48%	1	0.05%			-4	-0.19%	2,095
Wise County	5,149	46.14%	5,982	53.60%	12	0.11%	9	0.08%	8	0.07%			-833	-7.46%	11,160
Wythe County	2,810	51.80%	2,492	45.94%	104	1.92%	14	0.26%	5	0.09%			318	5.86%	5,425
York County	3,353	55.56%	2,543	42.14%	59	0.98%	64	1.06%	16	0.27%			810	13.42%	6,035
Alexandria City	8,987	50.52%	8,589	48.29%	62	0.35%	132	0.74%	18	0.10%			398	2.24%	17,788
Bedford City	689	43.64%	763	48.32%	55	3.48%	70	4.43%	2	0.13%			-74	-4.69%	1,579
Bristol City	1,113	38.71%	1,750	60.87%	1	0.03%	5	0.17%	6	0.21%			-637	-22.16%	2,875
Buena Vista City	636	52.82%	554	46.01%	4	0.33%	6	0.50%	4	0.33%			82	6.81%	1,204
Charlottesville City	3,826	44.13%	4,745	54.74%	40	0.46%	53	0.61%	4	0.05%	1	0.01%	-919	-10.60%	8,669
Chesapeake City	8,158	47.53%	8,214	47.86%	431	2.51%	318	1.85%	42	0.24%	1	0.01%	-56	-0.33%	17,164
Clifton Forge City	734	49.39%	720	48.45%	6	0.40%	25	1.68%	1	0.07%			14	0.94%	1,486
Colonial Heights City	1,923	53.85%	1,552	43.46%	61	1.71%	35	0.98%	0	0.00%			371	10.39%	3,571
Covington City	1,230	47.99%	1,309	51.07%	4	0.16%	16	0.62%	4	0.16%			-79	-3.08%	2,563
Danville City	5,040	46.11%	5,720	52.33%	100	0.91%	63	0.58%	7	0.06%			-680	-6.22%	10,930
Emporia City	713	45.97%	796	51.32%	20	1.29%	21	1.35%	0	0.00%	1	0.06%	-83	-5.35%	1,551
Fairfax City	1,872	51.68%	1,679	46.36%	28	0.77%	38	1.05%	5	0.14%			193	5.33%	3,622
Falls Church City	1,370	49.16%	1,393	49.98%	11	0.39%	12	0.43%	1	0.04%			-23	-0.83%	2,787
Franklin City	813	52.42%	720	46.42%	9	0.58%	6	0.39%	3	0.19%			93	6.00%	1,551
Fredericksburg City	1,748	42.60%	2,332	56.84%	9	0.22%	8	0.19%	6	0.15%			-584	-14.23%	4,103
Galax City	943	50.56%	911	48.85%	2	0.11%	7	0.38%	2	0.11%			32	1.72%	1,865
Hampton City	10,765	53.95%	8,946	44.83%	96	0.48%	120	0.60%	25	0.13%	2	0.01%	1,819	9.12%	19,954
Harrisonburg City	2,018	61.52%	1,251	38.14%	3	0.09%	7	0.21%	1	0.03%			767	23.38%	3,280
Hopewell City	2,214	49.64%	1,905	42.71%	303	6.79%	32	0.72%	6	0.13%			309	6.93%	4,460
Lexington City	817	58.11%	581	41.32%	1	0.07%	7	0.50%	0	0.00%			236	16.79%	1,406
Lynchburg City	5,694	54.50%	4,158	39.80%	341	3.26%	238	2.28%	17	0.16%			1,536	14.70%	10,448
Martinsville City	1,902	43.04%	2,482	56.17%	9	0.20%	22	0.50%	4	0.09%			-580	-13.13%	4,419
Newport News City	11,678	51.05%	10,776	47.11%	131	0.57%	258	1.13%	33	0.14%			902	3.94%	22,876
Norfolk City	20,311	45.15%	22,617	50.27%	1,795	3.99%	195	0.43%	57	0.13%	14	0.03%	-2,306	-5.13%	44,989
Norton City	477	47.75%	517	51.75%	2	0.20%	2	0.20%	1	0.10%			-40	-4.00%	999
Petersburg City	3,147	43.62%	3,896	54.01%	96	1.33%	48	0.67%	23	0.32%	4	0.06%	-749	-10.38%	7,214
Portsmouth City	9,638	40.61%	13,783	58.08%	122	0.51%	139	0.59%	49	0.21%			-4,145	-17.47%	23,731
Radford City	1,681	53.76%	1,436	45.92%	2	0.06%	7	0.22%	1	0.03%			245	7.83%	3,127
Richmond City	27,611	59.09%	18,377	39.33%	503	1.08%	197	0.42%	32	0.07%	4	0.01%	9,234	19.76%	46,724
Roanoke City	13,238	56.77%	9,860	42.28%	42	0.18%	165	0.71%	15	0.06%			3,378	14.49%	23,320
Salem City	3,356	64.66%	1,807	34.82%	4	0.08%	18	0.35%	3	0.06%	2	0.04%	1,549	29.85%	5,190
South Boston City	930	50.74%	894	48.77%	2	0.11%	7	0.38%	0	0.00%			36	1.96%	1,833
Staunton City	3,297	61.42%	2,051	38.21%	10	0.19%	9	0.17%	1	0.02%			1,246	23.21%	5,368
Suffolk City	1,183	49.17%	1,177	48.92%	6	0.25%	35	1.45%	5	0.21%			6	0.25%	2,406
Virginia Beach City	14,086	56.37%	10,210	40.86%	555	2.22%	119	0.48%	18	0.07%			3,876	15.51%	24,988
Waynesboro City	2,713	62.43%	1,587	36.52%	37	0.85%	6	0.14%	3	0.07%			1,126	25.91%	4,346
Williamsburg City	804	46.15%	884	50.75%	44	2.53%	10	0.57%	0	0.00%			-80	-4.59%	1,742
Winchester City	1,915	58.90%	1,318	40.54%	6	0.18%	5	0.15%	7	0.22%			597	18.36%	3,251
Totals	480,869	52.44%	415,695	45.34%	10,596	1.16%	7,382	0.81%	1,182	0.13%	1,182	0.13%	65,174	7.11%	916,906

Counties and independent cities that flipped from Conservative to Republican

- Chesterfield
- Lunenburg
- Sussex

Counties and independent cities that flipped from Republican to Democratic

- Greensville
- Russell
- Norton (independent city)
- Williamsburg (independent city)

Counties and independent cities that flipped from Conservative to Democratic

- Amelia
- Brunswick
- Charlotte
- Mecklenberg
- Nottoway
- Powhatan
- Prince Edward
- Surry

Counties and independent cities that flipped from Democratic to Republican

- Alleghany
- Bedford
- Bland
- Campbell
- Culpeper
- Dickenson
- Fluvanna
- Frederick
- Gloucester
- Hanover
- King George
- Lancaster
- Isle of Wight
- Lousia
- Madison
- Mathews
- Middlesex
- Nansemond
- Northumberland
- Orange
- Prince William
- Richmond
- Pulaski
- Stafford
- Warren
- Wythe
- York
- Clifton Forge (independent city)
- Buena Vista (independent city)
- Colonial Heights (independent city)
- Fairfax (independent city)
- Franklin (independent city)
- Galax (independent city)
- Hampton (independent city)
- Hopewell (independent city)
- Lynchburg (independent city)
- South Boston (independent city)
- Richmond (independent city)
- Staunton (independent city)
- Suffolk (independent city)
- Virginia Beach (independent city)
- Winchester (independent city)

== Analysis ==
The Democrats had held the governor's mansion for 84 years since 1885, and Holton's victory was considered a historic upset at the time. This was the first occasion when Republicans won a gubernatorial election in the state, and Holton even won 37 percent of the African American vote – a substantial share of which was won from blacks who had backed the liberal Howell in the two Democratic primaries. Holton was also helped by defections from Battle by supporters the conservative of Pollard in the first primary, although the Republican's largest gains were in the rapidly growing urban corridor, where Holton had been weakest in his previous gubernatorial run. Support from sitting President Nixon was another critical aspect of Holton's win.

As of 2025, this is the last occasion when the City of Alexandria voted Republican for Governor, but also the last when New Kent County, (Note: New Kent County and Prince George County backed independent Henry Howell in the following 1973 gubernatorial election, when Howell was supported by most Democrats as the party did not nominate a gubernatorial candidate.) Pittsylvania County, Powhatan County and Prince George County voted Democratic for Governor.
