= Barr McClellan =

American lawyer

Oliver Barr McClellan (born 1939) is an American entrepreneur, counsel and author who became widely known by his 2003 book Blood, Money & Power on the Kennedy assassination. He has also written on globalization.

== Life ==
Barr McClellan lived in Maracaibo, Venezuela, in 1944–1951. He spent time in the oilfield swamps and learned soccer. He also survived an airline crash in Mexico City in 1946. He graduated from Jefferson High School in San Antonio in 1957 (class president, graduation speaker), then enrolled at the University of Texas in Austin where he won the O. Henry and William Jennings Bryan literary awards. He graduated with honors, BA, with special honors in international studies, 1961, JD, 1964.

In 1966, McClellan joined a legal firm in Austin, Texas. At that time, the firm was run by a number of partners, including Edward A. Clark.

In 1972, McClellan became a full partner in the firm. After one year as University Attorney, McClellan established his own law firm in 1977. Some of McClellan's cases included litigation for exploding Ford Pintos, tobacco-caused expenses on the health care system and the licensing and regulation of cell phones."

McClellan was reported to be a "staunch conservative". He was a lobbyist for the Southern Union Gas Company.

McClellan's first wife was former Texas Comptroller of Public Accounts Carole Keeton Strayhorn. He is the father of Scott McClellan, former White House press secretary, and Mark McClellan, former Food and Drug Administration commissioner and former director of Medicare for the George W. Bush administration. Two other sons, Dudley McClellan and Bradley McClellan, are attorneys in Austin, Texas. McClellan is also related to Union General George McClellan, the Democrats' presidential candidate in 1864, and to George B. McClellan, New York City Mayor, 1903–07.

McClellan lives in Gulfport, Mississippi.

== Blood, Money & Power: How LBJ Killed JFK ==
External videos
- Presentation by McClellan on Blood, Money, & Power, November 19, 2003, C-SPAN

In 2003, McClellan's book Blood, Money & Power: How LBJ Killed JFK was published by Hanover House. The book presents the theory that McClellan's former employer, Edward A. Clark, and President Johnson conspired to have President Kennedy assassinated.

According to L. D. Meagher's review for CNN: "[McClellan] fabricates scenarios he never witnessed and invents conversations he was not party to in order to weave his yarn. Anything resembling evidence is relegated to sometimes-incomprehensible footnotes, and a jumble of photos and documents included as an appendix. And what evidence there is would be laughed out of any court in the world." Meagher added: "Blood, Money & Power is just the kind of book Warren Commission defenders point to when they issue blanket denunciations of all conspiracy theories." Publishers Weekly wrote that McClellan's "evidence is meager and murky, even by the standards of Kennedy conspiracy scholarship", and that "[t]he book offers many detailed accounts of conspiratorial meetings that turn out to be not fact but ... conjecture designed to distract readers from the lack of evidence." Their review concluded: "His confusingly structured, evasively argued, often nonsensical theories attest to the crime's continuing potency as a symbol of America's mythic heart of darkness."

After McClellan repeated his allegations against Johnson in an episode of the documentary series The Men Who Killed Kennedy titled "The Guilty Men", broadcast on The History Channel on November 18, 2003, former presidents Gerald Ford and Jimmy Carter protested, and former LBJ staffers Bill Moyers and Jack Valenti asked The History Channel to investigate the charges and subsequently threatened legal action against Arts & Entertainment Company, owner of the History Channel. On April 2, 2004, after having three historians examine the charges, The History Channel issued a press release stating that the claim of LBJ's complicity "is entirely unfounded and does not hold up to scrutiny. ... [The show] fell short of the high standards that the network use to set for itself. The History Channel apologizes to its viewers and to Mrs. [Lady Bird] Johnson and her family for airing the show."

== Books ==
- Blood, Money & Power: How L.B.J. Killed J.F.K, Hannover House, 2003, ISBN 0-9637846-2-5
- Made in the USA: Global Greed, Bad Tax Laws and The Exportation of America's Future, Hannover House, 2010, ISBN 978-0-963784-68-1

== External ==
- Addresses to the 2016 and 2021 JFK Assassination Conference.
