= Edward A. Clark =

American diplomat (1906–1992)

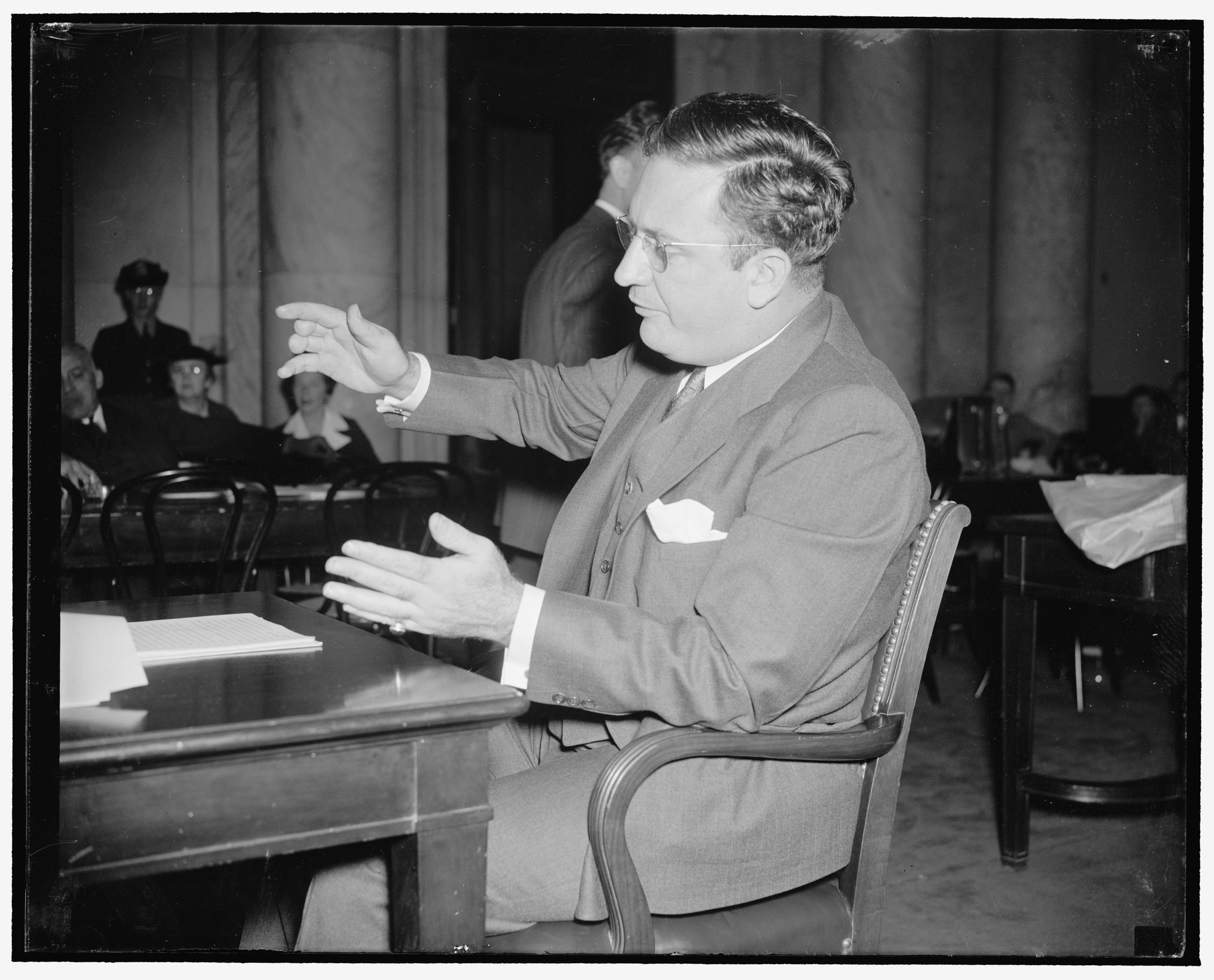

10th United States Ambassador to Australia
- In office 1965–1967
- President: Lyndon B. Johnson
- Preceded by: William C. Battle
- Succeeded by: William H. Crook

Personal details
- Born: July 15, 1906 San Augustine, Texas
- Died: September 16, 1992 (aged 86)
- Party: Democratic, then Republican
- Spouse: Anne Metcalfe
- Parent(s): John David; Leila Elizabeth Downs
- Education: Tulane University; University of Texas
- Profession: Lawyer, diplomat

Secretary of State of Texas
- In office 1937–1939
- Governor: James V. Allred
- Preceded by: B. P. Matocha
- Succeeded by: Tom Beauchamp

Edward Aubrey Clark (July 15, 1906 – September 16, 1992) was an American lawyer, politician, officer and diplomat. He served as the United States Ambassador to Australia from 1965 to 1968.

== Early life and education ==
Edward Aubrey Clark was born on July 15, 1906 in San Augustine, Texas, son of John David Clark and Leila Elizabeth Downs Clark. He obtained his first degree from Tulane University, in New Orleans.

In 1927, Clark married Anne Metcalfe of Greenville, Mississippi, the heir to the largest cotton plantation system in the South.

Clark received a law degree in 1928 from the University of Texas.

== Career ==
Clark became a county attorney in San Augustine and, in 1932, moved to Austin. He was assistant attorney general of Texas from 1932 to 1935.

In 1935, Clark became assistant to Governor James V. Allred. Soon afterward, he met Lyndon B. Johnson, and the two men became close friends.

Allred appointed Clark secretary of state in 1937. The following year, Clark opened a private law practice with Everett Looney. He also worked as a political lobbyist for the oil industry. One of his main clients was Big Oil, a company owned by Clint Murchison Sr., and Wofford Cain. He was also a member of the Texas State Guard.

=== Military service ===
After the Pearl Harbor attack, Clark joined the US Army. During the Second World War, he served as a captain in the Quartermaster Corps. Clark then returned to Austin.

=== Postwar ===
In 1944, Clark recruited Don Thomas and his law firm became known as Clark, Thomas and Winters. Over the next few years, it became one of the most influential and successful firms in Texas. Clark also served as chairman of Texas Commerce Bank of Austin and the First National Bank of San Augustine.

=== Politics and diplomacy ===
In 1948, Clark was appointed as Lyndon Johnson's legal counsel when Coke Stevenson contested Johnson's narrow victory in the primary. He remained active in the Democratic Party and was associated with those opposed to the liberal elements, led by Texas Senator Ralph Yarborough.

After the assassination of John F. Kennedy in 1963, Johnson became president. In 1965, Johnson appointed Clark as the US ambassador to Australia.

In 1972, Clark supported Richard Nixon for president over George McGovern. In 1974, President Nixon appointed Clark to the General Advisory Committee of the United States Arms Control and Disarmament Agency. Later, Clark supported Ronald Reagan, who became president.

== Death and legacy ==
Clark died on September 16, 1992.

The Edward A. Clark Center for Australian & New Zealand Studies is located within the University of Texas at Austin College of Liberal Arts. It was co-founded in 1988 by John Higley and Desley Deacon, and inaugurated by Prime Minister of Australia Bob Hawke.

=== Kennedy assassination conspiracy theories ===
In 2003, Barr McClellan, an attorney who had been employed by Clark's law firm in Austin, published Blood, Money & Power: How LBJ Killed JFK. The book alleged Johnson and Clark were conspirators in the assassination of Kennedy. According to McClellan, one of the senior partners in the firm had told him how Clark had arranged the assassination.

McClellan repeated his allegations in a 2003 episode of Nigel Turner's documentary television series, The Men Who Killed Kennedy titled "The Guilty Men", which was broadcast on The History Channel. Former US presidents Gerald Ford and Jimmy Carter protested, and former Johnson staffers Bill Moyers and Jack Valenti asked The History Channel to investigate the charges. On April 2, 2004, after having three historians examine the charges, The History Channel issued a press release stating the claim of Johnson's complicity "is entirely unfounded and does not hold up to scrutiny.... [The show] fell short of the high standards that the network sets for itself. The History Channel apologizes to its viewers and to Mrs. Lady Bird Johnson and her family for airing the show."

Diplomatic posts
Preceded by William C. Battle	United States Ambassador to Australia; 1965–1967	Succeeded by William H. Crook
