= Katherine Godwin =

First Lady of Virginia (1917–2015)

First Lady of Virginia
- In role January 12, 1974 – January 14, 1978
- Governor: Mills E. Godwin, Jr.
- Preceded by: Jinks Holton
- Succeeded by: Edwina P. Dalton
- In role January 15, 1966 – January 17, 1970
- Governor: Mills E. Godwin, Jr.
- Preceded by: Lacey Virginia Barkley
- Succeeded by: Jinks Holton

Second Lady of Virginia
- In role January 13, 1962 – January 15, 1966
- Lieutenant Governor: Mills E. Godwin, Jr.
- Preceded by: Anna Stephens
- Succeeded by: Pauline Pollard

Personal details
- Born: Katherine Thomas Beale; January 16, 1917 Southampton County, Virginia, U.S.
- Died: March 5, 2015 (aged 98) Williamsburg, Virginia, U.S.
- Spouse: Mills E. Godwin, Jr. (m. 1940; died 1999)
- Children: Becky Godwin (d. 1968)
- Parent(s): Fenton Parker and Dilla Bradshaw Beale
- Education: Madison College

Katherine Thomas Godwin (née Beale; January 16, 1917 – March 5, 2015) was the First Lady of Virginia from 1966 to 1970 and again from 1974 to 1978. She was born in Southampton County in 1917 and lost both parents to the 1918 flu epidemic. She graduated from Madison College in 1930 and taught elementary school in Chuckatuck, Virginia, before marrying Mills E. Godwin, Jr., in 1940. They adopted a daughter, Becky (b. 1954). In August 1968, while Governor Godwin was attending the 1968 Democratic National Convention in Chicago, Becky and her mother were vacationing at the Oceanfront area of Virginia Beach when Becky was killed in a lightning strike. Godwin died on March 5, 2015, in Williamsburg, Virginia, aged 98.
