= William C. Battle =

American lawyer

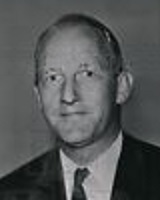

9th United States Ambassador to Australia
- In office July 13, 1962 – August 31, 1964
- President: John F. Kennedy; Lyndon B. Johnson
- Preceded by: William J. Sebald
- Succeeded by: Edward A. Clark

Personal details
- Born: William Cullen Battle; October 9, 1920 Charlottesville, Virginia, U.S.
- Died: May 31, 2008 (aged 87) Charlottesville, Virginia, U.S.
- Party: Democratic
- Spouse: Frances Barry Webb
- Children: 3
- Parent: John S.
- Education: University of Virginia
- Profession: Lawyer, Diplomat, Businessman

Military service
- Allegiance: United States
- Branch/service: United States Navy
- Rank: Lieutenant
- Battles/wars: World War II
- Awards: Silver Star Medal

William Cullen Battle (October 9, 1920 – May 31, 2008) was an American diplomat, lawyer, businessman, United States Ambassador to Australia, and president of the United States Golf Association.

== Early life and education ==
Battle was born in Charlottesville, Virginia on October 9, 1920. He was the son of John S. Battle, former Governor of Virginia (1950–54). While attending the University of Virginia, Battle played on the varsity golf team, until his graduation in 1941.

Battle served in the U.S. Navy during World War II and was awarded the Silver Star. He was in the same squadron in the South Pacific as John F. Kennedy and participated in Kennedy's rescue from the island on which he and his crew were marooned.

After the war, he returned to the University of Virginia, earned a law degree in 1947, and was admitted to the Virginia bar.

== Career ==
Battle worked in his father's law firm, as well as helped his father win election as Governor of Virginia in 1950. During the Massive Resistance crisis, both Battles represented the Albemarle County Public Schools, who were being sued by the NAACP on behalf of parents who wanted their children to attend integrated schools. After joint decisions of the Virginia Supreme Court and three-judge federal panel on January 19, 1959, undercut the Massive Resistance laws, known as the Stanley Plan (which, among other provisions, proposed closing any public school acceding to a court desegregation order), Battle ultimately negotiated a settlement with the NAACP, and Charlottesville public schools reopened.

The younger Battle later worked on Kennedy's 1960 presidential campaign and was appointed Ambassador to Australia, serving from 1962 to 1964.

In 1969, in an election that became known for the crumbling of the Massive Resistance and the Byrd Organization, Battle, the Democrats' gubernatorial candidate, lost to Linwood Holton. Holton who later put his children in Richmond's mostly African-American public schools, became the first Republican governor of the Commonwealth since the end of the Reconstruction Era.

Battle later became president and CEO of Fieldcrest Mills, a textile manufacturer, where he served as president from 1971 to 1981.

In 1978, Battle was elected to the executive committee of the United States Golf Association where he served until 1989. He served as USGA President from 1988 to 1989. He was also president of the Mid-Atlantic Golf Association in 1953.

== Personal life and death ==
Battle died in Charlottesville, Virginia after suffering a stroke. He was survived by his wife Barry (née Webb) Battle, three children, W. Cullen Battle, Jr., Dr. Robert (Bobby) W. Battle, and Janie Battle Richards, and six grandchildren.

Party political offices
Preceded by Mills Godwin	Democratic nominee for Governor of Virginia; 1969	Vacant Title next held by Henry Howell
Diplomatic posts
Preceded by William J. Sebald	U.S. Ambassador to Australia; 1962–1964	Succeeded by Ed Clark
