= 1969 Maryland gubernatorial special election =

1969 Maryland special gubernatorial election
- January 7, 1969
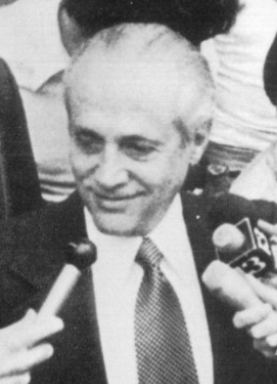

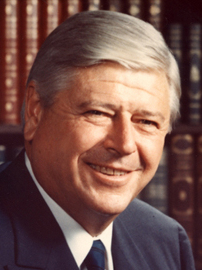
Nominee	Marvin Mandel	Rogers Morton
Party	Democratic	Republican
Electoral vote	126	26
Percentage	70.00%	14.44%
Nominee	Francis X. Gallagher	William S. James
Party	Democratic	Democratic
Electoral vote	15	13
Percentage	8.33%	7.22%
Governor before election
Spiro Agnew
Republican
Elected Governor
Marvin Mandel
Democratic

The 1969 Maryland gubernatorial special election was not a direct election, but a vote in the Maryland General Assembly to determine who would assume the governorship of Maryland after Spiro Agnew's resignation, following his election to the U.S. vice presidency.

At this time Maryland didn't have a position of lieutenant governor, and state law did not designate a person who would assume the office of governor in case of vacancy (unlike most states, when there is always a designated person such as lieutenant governor, Senate President or Secretary of State).

In case of vacancy, the General Assembly would choose a governor.

In 1969 the Assembly had a Democratic majority, so it was clear that Republican Agnew's successor would be a Democrat.

The election was held on January 7, 1969. State representative Marvin Mandel was elected governor. He took office that same day, upon Agnew's resignation.

== Candidates ==
- State Senator William S. James (D)
- State Delegate Francis X. Gallagher (D)
- State Delegate Marvin Mandel (D)
- U.S. Representative Rogers Morton (R)

== Vote ==
- Mandel (D) – 126 (70.00%):
- Morton (R) – 26 (14.44%)
- Gallagher (D) – 15 (8.33%)
- James (D) – 13 (7.22%)

Although there were three Democrats and only one Republican on the ballot, Mandel was elected easily. He was elected in the next regular direct election in 1970 and re-elected in 1974.
