= 1973 Virginia gubernatorial election =

- November 6, 1973
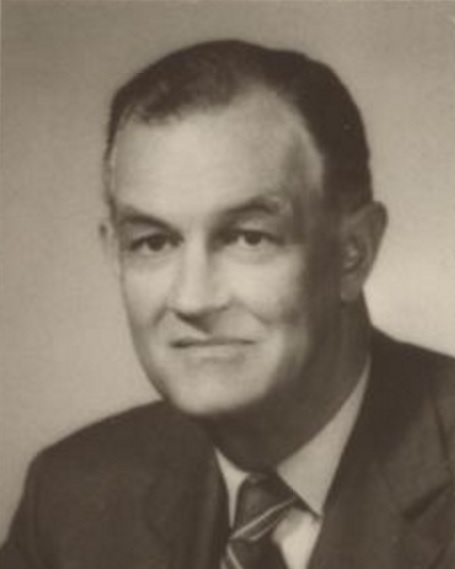

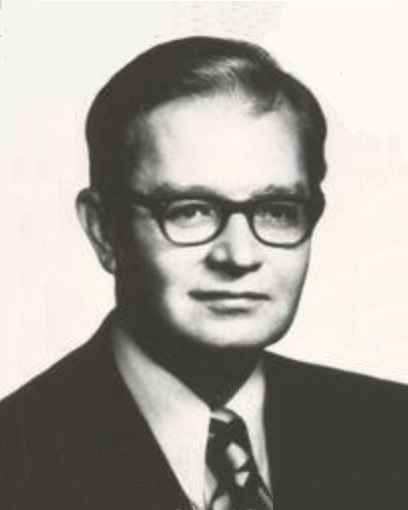
Nominee	Mills Godwin	Henry Howell
Party	Republican	Independent
Popular vote	525,075	510,103
Percentage	50.71%	49.26%
- County and independent city results Godwin: 50–60% 60–70% 70–80% Howell: 50–60% 60–70% 70–80%
Governor before election
Linwood Holton
Republican
Elected Governor
Mills Godwin
Republican

In the 1973 Virginia gubernatorial election, incumbent Governor A. Linwood Holton, Jr., a Republican, was unable to seek re-election due to term limits. Mills E. Godwin, Jr., former Democratic Governor of Virginia, was nominated by the Republican Party to run against Independent Lieutenant Governor of Virginia Henry Howell. The Democrats did not field a candidate, mostly choosing to support Howell's candidacy.

This was the last time until 2013 in which a member of the incumbent President's party was elected Governor of Virginia. It was also the last time a non-Democrat won the city of Alexandria.

== General election ==
=== Candidates ===
- Mills E. Godwin, Jr., former Governor of Virginia (Republican)
- Henry Howell, Lieutenant Governor of Virginia and candidate for Governor in 1969 (Independent)

=== Results ===
1973 Virginia gubernatorial election
Party	Candidate	Votes	%	±%
Republican	Mills Godwin	525,075	50.71%	▼1.80
Independent	Henry Howell	510,103	49.26%	N/A
Write-ins		317	0.03%	
Majority		14,972	1.45%	−5.67%
Turnout		1,035,495		
Republican hold		Swing		

==== Results by county or independent city ====
1973 Virginia gubernatorial election by county or independent city
	Mills Edwin Godwin Republican		Henry Evans Howell Independent		Various candidates Write-ins		Margin		Total votes cast
	#	%	#	%	#	%	#	%	Total votes cast
Accomack County	3,632	47.17%	4,066	52.81%	2	0.03%	-434	-5.64%	7,700
Albemarle County	5,225	52.48%	4,732	47.52%			493	4.95%	9,957
Alleghany County	1,180	39.40%	1,813	60.53%	2	0.07%	-633	-21.14%	2,995
Amelia County	1,277	58.02%	924	41.98%			353	16.04%	2,201
Amherst County	2,846	58.09%	2,052	41.89%	1	0.02%	794	16.21%	4,899
Appomattox County	1,699	64.36%	941	35.64%			758	28.71%	2,640
Arlington County	18,817	49.22%	19,406	50.76%	7	0.02%	-589	-1.54%	38,230
Augusta County	5,132	60.40%	3,356	39.50%	9	0.11%	1,776	20.90%	8,497
Bath County	555	41.29%	789	58.71%			-234	-17.41%	1,344
Bedford County	2,678	53.53%	2,324	46.45%	1	0.02%	354	7.08%	5,003
Bland County	765	53.50%	665	46.50%			100	6.99%	1,430
Botetourt County	1,857	47.02%	2,092	52.98%			-235	-5.95%	3,949
Brunswick County	1,950	49.32%	2,003	50.66%	1	0.03%	-53	-1.34%	3,954
Buchanan County	2,083	35.07%	3,856	64.93%			-1,773	-29.85%	5,939
Buckingham County	1,533	49.69%	1,551	50.28%	1	0.03%	-18	-0.58%	3,085
Campbell County	6,991	70.40%	2,939	29.60%			4,052	40.81%	9,930
Caroline County	1,246	39.77%	1,887	60.23%			-641	-20.46%	3,133
Carroll County	2,542	53.31%	2,226	46.69%			316	6.63%	4,768
Charles City County	335	25.38%	984	74.55%	1	0.08%	-649	-49.17%	1,320
Charlotte County	1,752	52.90%	1,560	47.10%			192	5.80%	3,312
Chesterfield County	15,868	71.24%	6,407	28.76%			9,461	42.47%	22,275
Clarke County	1,144	66.17%	584	33.78%	1	0.06%	560	32.39%	1,729
Craig County	357	37.27%	601	62.73%			-244	-25.47%	958
Culpeper County	2,401	62.54%	1,438	37.46%			963	25.08%	3,839
Cumberland County	987	49.23%	1,018	50.77%			-31	-1.55%	2,005
Dickenson County	2,140	37.09%	3,628	62.88%	2	0.03%	-1,488	-25.79%	5,770
Dinwiddie County	1,893	42.62%	2,547	57.34%	2	0.05%	-654	-14.72%	4,442
Essex County	1,023	64.66%	559	35.34%			464	29.33%	1,582
Fairfax County	50,583	51.91%	46,843	48.07%	12	0.01%	3,740	3.84%	97,438
Fauquier County	2,827	63.53%	1,623	36.47%			1,204	27.06%	4,450
Floyd County	1,048	52.06%	965	47.94%			83	4.12%	2,013
Fluvanna County	836	53.35%	731	46.65%			105	6.70%	1,567
Franklin County	2,250	38.09%	3,655	61.88%	2	0.03%	-1,405	-23.79%	5,907
Frederick County	2,644	57.69%	1,934	42.20%	5	0.11%	710	15.49%	4,583
Giles County	1,769	40.64%	2,584	59.36%			-815	-18.72%	4,353
Gloucester County	1,900	51.30%	1,802	48.65%	2	0.05%	98	2.65%	3,704
Goochland County	1,500	52.30%	1,368	47.70%			132	4.60%	2,868
Grayson County	1,530	45.28%	1,849	54.72%			-319	-9.44%	3,379
Greene County	567	47.61%	624	52.39%			-57	-4.79%	1,191
Greensville County	1,032	41.78%	1,438	58.22%			-406	-16.44%	2,470
Halifax County	2,869	56.05%	2,250	43.95%			619	12.09%	5,119
Hanover County	7,649	68.14%	3,576	31.85%	1	0.01%	4,073	36.28%	11,226
Henrico County	33,415	72.49%	12,641	27.42%	37	0.08%	20,774	45.07%	46,093
Henry County	4,107	42.63%	5,525	57.34%	3	0.03%	-1,418	-14.72%	9,635
Highland County	441	62.64%	263	37.36%			178	25.28%	704
Isle of Wight County	2,400	45.85%	2,833	54.12%	2	0.04%	-433	-8.27%	5,235
James City County	2,129	48.32%	2,277	51.68%			-148	-3.36%	4,406
King and Queen County	553	41.89%	767	58.11%			-214	-16.21%	1,320
King George County	810	52.19%	742	47.81%			68	4.38%	1,552
King William County	1,089	54.70%	900	45.20%	2	0.10%	189	9.49%	1,991
Lancaster County	1,760	55.26%	1,424	44.71%	1	0.03%	336	10.55%	3,185
Lee County	2,820	46.19%	3,285	53.81%			-465	-7.62%	6,105
Loudoun County	4,787	55.04%	3,908	44.93%	3	0.03%	879	10.11%	8,698
Louisa County	1,574	49.31%	1,616	50.63%	2	0.06%	-42	-1.32%	3,192
Lunenburg County	1,574	58.27%	1,127	41.73%			447	16.55%	2,701
Madison County	1,029	53.87%	877	45.92%	4	0.21%	152	7.96%	1,910
Mathews County	1,375	53.92%	1,155	45.29%	20	0.78%	220	8.63%	2,550
Mecklenburg County	3,825	62.91%	2,255	37.09%			1,570	25.82%	6,080
Middlesex County	1,050	57.63%	772	42.37%			278	15.26%	1,822
Montgomery County	4,924	49.88%	4,936	50.01%	11	0.11%	-12	-0.12%	9,871
Nelson County	1,051	48.19%	1,127	51.67%	3	0.14%	-76	-3.48%	2,181
New Kent County	715	45.98%	840	54.02%			-125	-8.04%	1,555
Northampton County	1,728	45.00%	2,111	54.97%	1	0.03%	-383	-9.97%	3,840
Northumberland County	1,394	53.64%	1,204	46.33%	1	0.04%	190	7.31%	2,599
Nottoway County	2,162	54.57%	1,800	45.43%			362	9.14%	3,962
Orange County	1,485	55.00%	1,215	45.00%			270	10.00%	2,700
Page County	1,720	48.42%	1,832	51.58%			-112	-3.15%	3,552
Patrick County	1,284	47.93%	1,394	52.03%	1	0.04%	-110	-4.11%	2,679
Pittsylvania County	5,733	55.01%	4,681	44.92%	7	0.07%	1,052	10.10%	10,421
Powhatan County	1,215	57.15%	908	42.71%	3	0.14%	307	14.44%	2,126
Prince Edward County	2,263	59.26%	1,552	40.64%	4	0.10%	711	18.62%	3,819
Prince George County	1,226	44.55%	1,526	55.45%			-300	-10.90%	2,752
Prince William County	8,159	52.29%	7,441	47.69%	3	0.02%	718	4.60%	15,603
Pulaski County	3,149	48.37%	3,361	51.63%			-212	-3.26%	6,510
Rappahannock County	633	55.72%	503	44.28%			130	11.44%	1,136
Richmond County	1,091	60.78%	702	39.11%	2	0.11%	389	21.67%	1,795
Roanoke County	9,357	52.65%	8,409	47.31%	7	0.04%	948	5.33%	17,773
Rockbridge County	1,492	48.77%	1,566	51.19%	1	0.03%	-74	-2.42%	3,059
Rockingham County	5,983	56.86%	4,538	43.13%	1	0.01%	1,445	13.73%	10,522
Russell County	3,109	41.64%	4,358	58.36%			-1,249	-16.73%	7,467
Scott County	2,612	46.06%	3,059	53.94%			-447	-7.88%	5,671
Shenandoah County	3,614	59.78%	2,427	40.14%	5	0.08%	1,187	19.63%	6,046
Smyth County	2,932	46.00%	3,438	53.94%	4	0.06%	-506	-7.94%	6,374
Southampton County	2,117	51.02%	2,031	48.95%	1	0.02%	86	2.07%	4,149
Spotsylvania County	1,507	40.43%	2,220	59.57%			-713	-19.13%	3,727
Stafford County	1,996	43.98%	2,542	56.02%			-546	-12.03%	4,538
Surry County	745	38.98%	1,166	61.02%			-421	-22.03%	1,911
Sussex County	1,512	45.54%	1,807	54.43%	1	0.03%	-295	-8.89%	3,320
Tazewell County	3,455	48.44%	3,676	51.54%	1	0.01%	-221	-3.10%	7,132
Warren County	1,719	46.42%	1,981	53.50%	3	0.08%	-262	-7.08%	3,703
Washington County	4,086	49.77%	4,123	50.23%			-37	-0.45%	8,209
Westmoreland County	1,461	54.88%	1,201	45.12%			260	9.77%	2,662
Wise County	2,966	39.94%	4,460	60.06%			-1,494	-20.12%	7,426
Wythe County	2,803	58.75%	1,968	41.25%			835	17.50%	4,771
York County	3,918	48.42%	4,174	51.58%			-256	-3.16%	8,092
Alexandria City	8,647	44.62%	10,720	55.32%	12	0.06%	-2,073	-10.70%	19,379
Bedford City	923	60.05%	614	39.95%			309	20.10%	1,537
Bristol City	1,258	54.89%	1,033	45.07%	1	0.04%	225	9.82%	2,292
Buena Vista City	596	46.86%	676	53.14%			-80	-6.29%	1,272
Charlottesville City	4,600	47.10%	5,162	52.85%	5	0.05%	-562	-5.75%	9,767
Chesapeake City	7,977	38.12%	12,946	61.86%	5	0.02%	-4,969	-23.74%	20,928
Clifton Forge City	684	46.95%	773	53.05%			-89	-6.11%	1,457
Colonial Heights City	3,011	69.65%	1,311	30.33%	1	0.02%	1,700	39.32%	4,323
Covington City	917	39.85%	1,384	60.15%			-467	-20.30%	2,301
Danville City	8,466	66.67%	4,233	33.33%			4,233	33.33%	12,699
Emporia City	934	57.98%	677	42.02%			257	15.95%	1,611
Fairfax City	2,336	54.35%	1,959	45.58%	3	0.07%	377	8.77%	4,298
Falls Church City	1,425	48.01%	1,543	51.99%			-118	-3.98%	2,968
Franklin City	964	51.11%	922	48.89%			42	2.23%	1,886
Fredericksburg City	1,593	46.89%	1,804	53.11%			-211	-6.21%	3,397
Galax City	771	50.69%	750	49.31%			21	1.38%	1,521
Hampton City	9,925	43.55%	12,861	56.43%	5	0.02%	-2,936	-12.88%	22,791
Harrisonburg City	2,491	62.76%	1,478	37.24%			1,013	25.52%	3,969
Hopewell City	2,894	53.95%	2,470	46.05%			424	7.90%	5,364
Lexington City	893	56.55%	683	43.26%	3	0.19%	210	13.30%	1,579
Lynchburg City	8,833	65.81%	4,584	34.16%	4	0.03%	4,249	31.66%	13,421
Martinsville City	2,876	54.95%	2,358	45.05%			518	9.90%	5,234
Nansemond City	3,725	42.00%	5,143	57.98%	2	0.02%	-1,418	-15.99%	8,870
Newport News City	13,165	46.72%	15,007	53.26%	4	0.01%	-1,842	-6.54%	28,176
Norfolk City	17,852	34.35%	34,118	65.65%	3	0.01%	-16,266	-31.30%	51,973
Norton City	538	49.31%	553	50.69%			-15	-1.37%	1,091
Petersburg City	4,308	43.35%	5,628	56.63%	2	0.02%	-1,320	-13.28%	9,938
Portsmouth City	8,724	32.24%	18,327	67.74%	5	0.02%	-9,603	-35.49%	27,056
Radford City	1,664	53.49%	1,446	46.48%	1	0.03%	218	7.01%	3,111
Richmond City	28,127	48.09%	30,328	51.85%	37	0.06%	-2,201	-3.76%	58,492
Roanoke City	8,912	45.15%	10,807	54.75%	20	0.10%	-1,895	-9.60%	19,739
Salem City	2,758	51.31%	2,610	48.56%	7	0.13%	148	2.75%	5,375
South Boston City	1,227	67.72%	585	32.28%			642	35.43%	1,812
Staunton City	3,482	64.60%	1,908	35.40%			1,574	29.20%	5,390
Suffolk City	1,807	54.43%	1,512	45.54%	1	0.03%	295	8.89%	3,320
Virginia Beach City	19,710	49.22%	20,327	50.76%	6	0.01%	-617	-1.54%	40,043
Waynesboro City	2,829	63.96%	1,590	35.95%	4	0.09%	1,239	28.01%	4,423
Williamsburg City	1,334	55.01%	1,091	44.99%			243	10.02%	2,425
Winchester City	3,149	66.74%	1,568	33.23%	1	0.02%	1,581	33.51%	4,718
Totals	525,075	50.71%	510,103	49.26%	317	0.03%	14,972	1.45%	1,035,495

Counties and independent cities that flipped from Democratic to Independent

- Accomack
- Bath
- Brunswick
- Buchanan
- Buckingham
- Caroline
- Charles City
- Craig
- Cumberland
- Dinwiddie
- Franklin
- Giles
- Greensville
- Henry
- King and Queen
- James City (no municipalities)
- Lee
- Nelson
- New Kent
- Northampton
- Patrick
- Prince George
- Russell
- Spotsylvania
- Surry
- Tazewell
- Wise
- Chesapeake (independent city)
- Charlottesville (independent city)
- Covington (independent city)
- Fredericksburg (independent city)
- Falls Church (independent city)
- Norfolk (independent city)
- Norton (independent city)
- Petersburg (independent city)
- Portsmouth (independent city)

Counties and independent cities that flipped from Democratic to Republican

- Albemarle
- Amelia
- Amherst
- Appomattox
- Charlotte
- Clarke
- Essex
- Fauquier
- Goochland
- Halifax
- King William
- Loudoun
- Mecklenberg
- Nottoway
- Pittsylvania
- Powhatan
- Prince Edward
- Rappahannock
- Southampton
- Westmoreland
- Bedford (independent city)
- Bristol (independent city)
- Danville (independent city)
- Emporia (independent city)
- Martinsville (independent city)
- Williamsburg (independent city)

Counties and independent cities that flipped from Republican to Independent

- Alleghany
- Arlington
- Botetourt
- Dickenson
- Greene
- Grayson
- Isle of Wight
- Lousia
- Montgomery
- Nansemond
- Page
- Pulaski
- Rockbridge
- Scott
- Smyth
- Stafford
- Sussex
- Warren
- Washington
- York
- Alexandria (independent city)
- Clifton Forge (independent city)
- Buena Vista (independent city)
- Hampton (independent city)
- Newport News (independent city)
- Richmond (independent city)
- Roanoke (independent city)
- Virginia Beach (independent city)
