= 1965 Virginia gubernatorial election =

- November 2, 1965
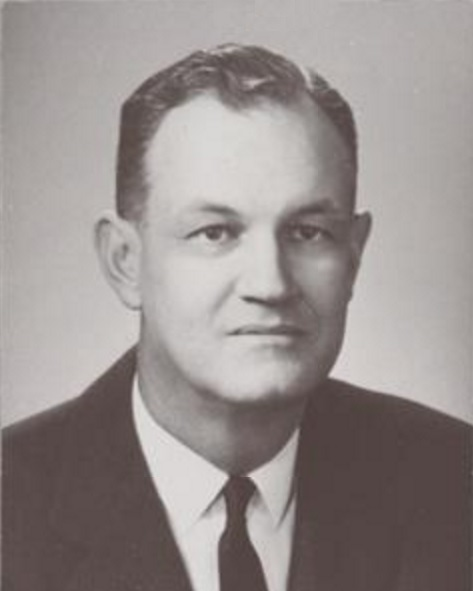

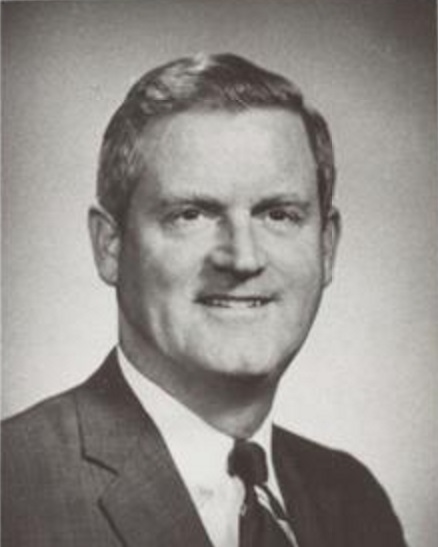

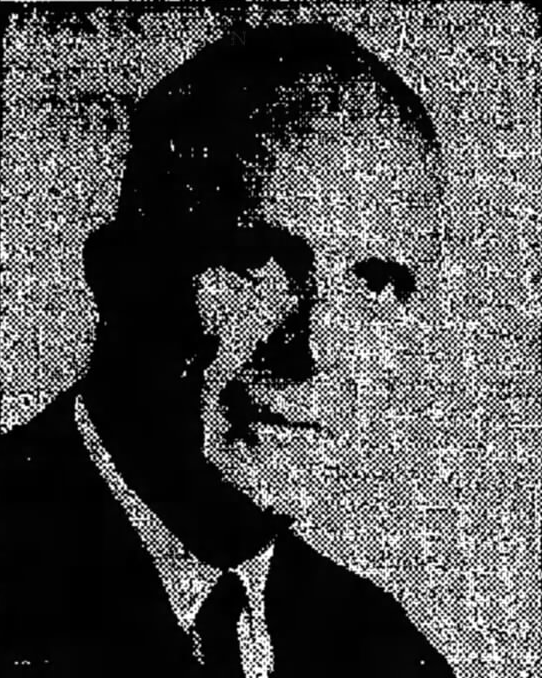
Nominee	Mills Godwin	Linwood Holton	William J. Story Jr.
Party	Democratic	Republican	Conservative
Popular vote	269,526	212,207	75,307
Percentage	47.89%	37.71%	13.38%
- County and independent city results Godwin: 30–40% 40–50% 50–60% 60–70% 70–80% Holton: 30–40% 40–50% 50–60% 60–70% Story: 30–40% 40–50% 50–60%
Governor before election
Albertis Harrison
Democratic
Elected Governor
Mills Godwin
Democratic

In the 1965 Virginia gubernatorial election, incumbent Governor of the U.S. state, Albertis Harrison, a Democrat, was unable to seek re-election due to term limits. For the first time in many decades there was an uncontested Democratic primary, in which incumbent Lieutenant Governor Mills Godwin was unopposed. Linwood Holton, an attorney from Roanoke, was nominated by the Republican Party, whilst the newly formed Virginia Conservative Party nominated William J. Story Jr. of Chesapeake.

This is the last time York County would vote Democratic in a gubernatorial election until 2025.

== Background ==
For the previous six decades, Virginia had had the most restricted electorate in the nation due to a cumulative poll tax and literacy tests, completely disenfranchising most blacks and poorer whites. This allowed for state politics to be dominated by the conservative Democratic "Byrd Organization", as "antiorganization" factions were rendered impotent by the inability of almost all their potential electorate to vote. Things would be substantially changed in the previous year's presidential election, as strong registration drives would almost double black voter registration from around 110,000 to 200,000 in a few years.

Incumbent lieutenant governor Mills E. Godwin was viewed as the leading Democratic candidate for Governor from the time of the previous year's elections, especially after Harry Byrd Jr. chose not to run in December. Godwin was a product of the Byrd Organization but not shackled to its traditional thinking: he sought alliances with unions, urban whites and the growing black electorate as well as Byrd stalwarts.

=== Right-wing challenges to the Byrd Democrats ===
Opposition to Holton's new strategies within the organization led to the formation of firstly the Conservative Council and then a "Conservative Party" led by John Birch Society member William Story. The Conservatives believed that the pay-as-you-go political system must be reinforced and federal control eliminated throughout the state. The Conservatives attacked Godwin as

Lyndon [Johnson]'s fair-headed boy backed by welfare payments funded by hardworking taxpayers.

Besides Story and his Conservatives, George Lincoln Rockwell, an avowed white supremacist and founder/leader of the American Nazi Party, ran as an independent candidate. Rockwell planned his run at least a year in advance, telling an associate that such a campaign would be useful to inflame the reaction of the Jewish population. He filed for governor as an independent on April 20 with a campaign that promoted white schools, law and order, taxes and welfare, anti-subversive commission, and relocation benefits. At the close of the campaign, Rockwell said that he would end NAACP meetings in the state.

== General election ==
=== Polls ===
Source	Ranking	As of
The Free Lance-Star	Likely D	November 1, 1965
The Evening Times	Likely D	November 2, 1965

=== Candidates ===
- Mills E. Godwin Jr., Lieutenant Governor of Virginia (Democratic)
- A. Linwood Holton Jr., Roanoke attorney (Republican)
- William J. Story Jr., assistant superintendent of Chesapeake City Public Schools (Conservative)
- George Lincoln Rockwell, founder of the American Nazi Party (Independent)

=== Results ===
1965 Virginia gubernatorial election
Party	Candidate	Votes	%	±%
Democratic	Mills E. Godwin Jr.	296,526	47.89%	−15.96%
Republican	A. Linwood Holton Jr.	212,207	37.71%	+1.56%
Conservative	William J. Story Jr.	75,307	13.38%	+13.38%
White Constitutional	George Lincoln Rockwell	5,730	1.02%	
Write-ins		19	<0.01%	
Majority		84,319	14.98%	−12.73%
Turnout		562,789		
Democratic hold		Swing		

==== Results by county or independent city ====
1965 Virginia gubernatorial election by county or independent city
	Mills Edwin Godwin jr. Democratic		Abner Linwood Holton jr. Republican		William J. Story Jr. Conservative		George Lincoln Rockwell Independent		Margin		Total votes cast
	#	%	#	%	#	%	#	%	#	%	Total votes cast
Accomack County	2,284	65.67%	892	25.65%	255	7.33%	47	1.35%	1,392	40.02%	3,478
Albemarle County	2,108	51.31%	1,495	36.39%	438	10.66%	66	1.61%	613	14.92%	4,107
Alleghany County	903	55.67%	583	35.94%	110	6.78%	26	1.60%	320	19.73%	1,622
Amelia County	627	40.14%	156	9.99%	762	48.78%	17	1.09%	-135 (Note: In this county or city where Holton ran third behind Godwin and Story, margin given is Godwin vote minus Story vote and percentage margin Godwin percentage minus Story percentage.)	-8.64%	1,562
Amherst County	1,553	52.01%	629	21.06%	759	25.42%	45	1.51%	794	26.59%	2,986
Appomattox County	1,216	59.43%	247	12.07%	559	27.32%	24	1.17%	657	32.11%	2,046
Arlington County	11,193	43.72%	13,079	51.09%	1,026	4.01%	303	1.18%	-1,886	-7.37%	25,601
Augusta County	2,503	43.95%	2,914	51.17%	211	3.71%	67	1.18%	-411	-7.22%	5,695
Bath County	411	57.32%	248	34.59%	51	7.11%	7	0.98%	163	22.73%	717
Bedford County	2,053	45.21%	1,513	33.32%	847	18.65%	128	2.82%	540	11.89%	4,541
Bland County	542	53.82%	410	40.71%	39	3.87%	16	1.59%	132	13.11%	1,007
Botetourt County	1,143	42.38%	1,367	50.69%	169	6.27%	18	0.67%	-224	-8.31%	2,697
Brunswick County	672	25.30%	518	19.50%	1,447	54.48%	19	0.72%	-775	-29.18%	2,656
Buchanan County	2,776	61.46%	1,557	34.47%	56	1.24%	128	2.83%	1,219	26.99%	4,517
Buckingham County	1,013	68.68%	205	13.90%	248	16.81%	9	0.61%	765	51.86%	1,475
Campbell County	1,662	39.43%	1,267	30.06%	1,194	28.33%	92	2.18%	395	9.37%	4,215
Caroline County	835	53.63%	225	14.45%	493	31.66%	4	0.26%	342	21.97%	1,557
Carroll County	1,439	32.18%	2,895	64.74%	92	2.06%	46	1.03%	-1,456	-32.56%	4,472
Charles City County	598	77.97%	88	11.47%	77	10.04%	4	0.52%	510	66.49%	767
Charlotte County	661	37.28%	238	13.42%	851	48.00%	23	1.30%	-190	-10.72%	1,773
Chesterfield County	4,314	29.40%	4,634	31.59%	5,656	38.55%	67	0.46%	-1,022 (Note: In this county or city where Godwin ran third behind both Holton and Story, margin given is Holton vote minus Story vote and percentage margin Holton percentage minus Story percentage.)	-6.97%	14,671
Clarke County	608	67.56%	255	28.33%	20	2.22%	17	1.89%	353	39.22%	900
Craig County	482	58.71%	319	38.86%	19	2.31%	1	0.12%	163	19.85%	821
Culpeper County	1,454	68.36%	552	25.95%	80	3.76%	41	1.93%	902	42.41%	2,127
Cumberland County	591	49.96%	110	9.30%	477	40.32%	5	0.42%	114	9.64%	1,183
Dickenson County	1,369	53.08%	1,153	44.71%	21	0.81%	36	1.40%	216	8.38%	2,579
Dinwiddie County	1,313	54.28%	267	11.04%	826	34.15%	13	0.54%	487	20.13%	2,419
Essex County	331	43.32%	142	18.59%	290	37.96%	1	0.13%	41	5.37%	764
Fairfax County	16,974	43.20%	20,917	53.23%	1,055	2.68%	346	0.88%	-3,943	-10.03%	39,292
Fauquier County	1,850	67.64%	809	29.58%	55	2.01%	21	0.77%	1,041	38.06%	2,735
Floyd County	623	32.05%	1,261	64.87%	48	2.47%	12	0.62%	-638	-32.82%	1,944
Fluvanna County	441	46.52%	195	20.57%	300	31.65%	12	1.27%	141	14.87%	948
Franklin County	2,298	53.13%	1,654	38.24%	283	6.54%	90	2.08%	644	14.89%	4,325
Frederick County	1,168	56.32%	827	39.87%	57	2.75%	22	1.06%	341	16.44%	2,074
Giles County	1,606	51.74%	1,348	43.43%	134	4.32%	16	0.52%	258	8.31%	3,104
Gloucester County	936	53.95%	485	27.95%	299	17.23%	15	0.86%	451	25.99%	1,735
Goochland County	859	51.19%	251	14.96%	557	33.19%	11	0.66%	302	18.00%	1,678
Grayson County	2,209	48.49%	2,240	49.17%	81	1.78%	26	0.57%	-31	-0.68%	4,556
Greene County	305	39.66%	370	48.11%	57	7.41%	37	4.81%	-65	-8.45%	769
Greensville County	1,068	28.34%	1,441	38.23%	1,182	31.36%	78	2.07%	259	6.87%	3,769
Halifax County	1,578	45.51%	954	27.52%	852	24.57%	83	2.39%	624	18.00%	3,467
Hanover County	1,636	40.78%	1,235	30.78%	1,099	27.39%	42	1.05%	401	10.00%	4,012
Henrico County	8,311	35.91%	8,814	38.08%	5,875	25.38%	137	0.59%	-503	-2.17%	23,137
Henry County	1,879	53.30%	1,229	34.87%	359	10.18%	58	1.65%	650	18.44%	3,525
Highland County	329	44.34%	381	51.35%	22	2.96%	10	1.35%	-52	-7.01%	742
Isle of Wight County	1,592	63.76%	511	20.46%	382	15.30%	12	0.48%	1,081	43.29%	2,497
James City County	607	49.84%	439	36.04%	151	12.40%	21	1.72%	168	13.79%	1,218
King and Queen County	328	52.40%	91	14.54%	187	29.87%	20	3.19%	141	22.52%	626
King George County	595	64.19%	278	29.99%	37	3.99%	17	1.83%	317	34.20%	927
King William County	630	54.83%	202	17.58%	308	26.81%	9	0.78%	322	28.02%	1,149
Lancaster County	688	48.66%	450	31.82%	261	18.46%	15	1.06%	238	16.83%	1,414
Lee County	2,583	67.62%	1,118	29.27%	33	0.86%	86	2.25%	1,465	38.35%	3,820
Loudoun County	1,847	58.41%	1,171	37.03%	87	2.75%	53	1.68%	676	21.38%	3,158
Louisa County	890	49.53%	307	17.08%	572	31.83%	27	1.50%	318	17.70%	1,796
Lunenburg County	993	40.58%	200	8.17%	1,247	50.96%	7	0.29%	-254	-10.38%	2,447
Madison County	500	50.15%	376	37.71%	97	9.73%	24	2.41%	124	12.44%	997
Mathews County	780	54.47%	482	33.66%	159	11.10%	11	0.77%	298	20.81%	1,432
Mecklenburg County	1,439	39.03%	663	17.98%	1,549	42.01%	36	0.98%	-110	-2.98%	3,687
Middlesex County	541	51.67%	193	18.43%	299	28.56%	14	1.34%	242	23.11%	1,047
Montgomery County	2,196	38.06%	3,263	56.55%	269	4.66%	42	0.73%	-1,067	-18.49%	5,770
Nansemond County	3,441	71.90%	697	14.56%	628	13.12%	20	0.42%	2,744	57.33%	4,786
Nelson County	793	67.43%	227	19.30%	121	10.29%	34	2.89%	566	48.13%	1,175
New Kent County	314	41.48%	188	24.83%	250	33.03%	5	0.66%	64	8.45%	757
Northampton County	958	56.62%	492	29.08%	237	14.01%	5	0.30%	466	27.54%	1,692
Northumberland County	549	47.86%	394	34.35%	197	17.18%	7	0.61%	155	13.51%	1,147
Nottoway County	1,054	39.91%	178	6.74%	1,391	52.67%	18	0.68%	-337	-12.76%	2,641
Orange County	892	54.59%	490	29.99%	228	13.95%	24	1.47%	402	24.60%	1,634
Page County	1,992	45.46%	2,250	51.35%	75	1.71%	65	1.48%	-258	-5.89%	4,382
Patrick County	935	60.17%	550	35.39%	57	3.67%	12	0.77%	385	24.77%	1,554
Pittsylvania County	2,334	45.68%	1,033	20.22%	1,644	32.18%	98	1.92%	690	13.51%	5,109
Powhatan County	546	41.74%	125	9.56%	636	48.62%	1	0.08%	-90	-6.88%	1,308
Prince Edward County	1,085	42.04%	236	9.14%	1,242	48.12%	18	0.70%	-157	-6.08%	2,581
Prince George County	1,169	52.26%	490	21.90%	564	25.21%	14	0.63%	605	27.05%	2,237
Prince William County	2,392	61.43%	1,364	35.03%	81	2.08%	57	1.46%	1,028	26.40%	3,894
Pulaski County	1,865	49.29%	1,669	44.11%	224	5.92%	26	0.69%	196	5.18%	3,784
Rappahannock County	355	65.26%	173	31.80%	8	1.47%	8	1.47%	182	33.46%	544
Richmond County	328	49.25%	197	29.58%	132	19.82%	9	1.35%	131	19.67%	666
Roanoke County	3,470	31.36%	7,032	63.56%	492	4.45%	70	0.63%	-3,562	-32.19%	11,064
Rockbridge County	1,206	43.76%	1,309	47.50%	223	8.09%	18	0.65%	-103	-3.74%	2,756
Rockingham County	2,302	40.79%	3,089	54.73%	189	3.35%	64	1.13%	-787	-13.94%	5,644
Russell County	1,797	45.15%	2,064	51.86%	75	1.88%	44	1.11%	-267	-6.71%	3,980
Scott County	1,909	37.39%	3,032	59.39%	76	1.49%	88	1.72%	-1,123	-22.00%	5,105
Shenandoah County	1,900	38.23%	2,896	58.27%	122	2.45%	52	1.05%	-996	-20.04%	4,970
Smyth County	1,843	41.68%	2,467	55.79%	72	1.63%	40	0.90%	-624	-14.11%	4,422
Southampton County	1,284	45.12%	289	10.15%	1,262	44.34%	11	0.39%	22	0.77%	2,846
Spotsylvania County	1,326	60.69%	586	26.82%	169	7.73%	104	4.76%	740	33.87%	2,185
Stafford County	1,719	55.98%	1,117	36.37%	97	3.16%	138	4.49%	602	19.60%	3,071
Surry County	472	27.60%	606	35.44%	623	36.43%	9	0.53%	-17	-0.99%	1,710
Sussex County	931	35.08%	584	22.00%	1,130	42.58%	9	0.34%	-199	-7.50%	2,654
Tazewell County	2,736	54.10%	2,153	42.57%	111	2.19%	57	1.13%	583	11.53%	5,057
Warren County	1,490	58.78%	903	35.62%	109	4.30%	33	1.30%	587	23.16%	2,535
Washington County	2,642	48.02%	2,772	50.38%	40	0.73%	48	0.87%	-130	-2.36%	5,502
Westmoreland County	509	53.69%	314	33.12%	108	11.39%	17	1.79%	195	20.57%	948
Wise County	3,175	58.81%	2,186	40.49%	15	0.28%	23	0.43%	989	18.32%	5,399
Wythe County	1,932	48.24%	1,844	46.04%	186	4.64%	43	1.07%	88	2.20%	4,005
York County	1,435	46.88%	1,289	42.11%	287	9.38%	50	1.63%	146	4.77%	3,061
Alexandria City	5,077	47.22%	5,269	49.00%	283	2.63%	122	1.13%	-192	-1.79%	10,751
Bristol City	1,156	61.46%	710	37.75%	12	0.64%	3	0.16%	446	23.71%	1,881
Buena Vista City	501	57.39%	310	35.51%	57	6.53%	5	0.57%	191	21.88%	873
Charlottesville City	2,705	50.36%	1,997	37.18%	613	11.41%	56	1.04%	708	13.18%	5,371
Chesapeake City	5,124	47.82%	2,124	19.82%	3,353	31.29%	114	1.06%	1,771	16.53%	10,715
Clifton Forge City	761	56.25%	483	35.70%	95	7.02%	14	1.03%	278	20.55%	1,353
Colonial Heights City	1,088	42.75%	604	23.73%	833	32.73%	20	0.79%	255	10.02%	2,545
Covington City	1,273	61.44%	669	32.29%	101	4.87%	29	1.40%	604	29.15%	2,072
Danville City	2,420	45.08%	1,247	23.23%	1,651	30.76%	50	0.93%	769	14.33%	5,368
Fairfax City	1,006	49.07%	962	46.93%	67	3.27%	15	0.73%	44	2.15%	2,050
Falls Church City	980	45.73%	1,090	50.86%	54	2.52%	19	0.89%	-110	-5.13%	2,143
Franklin City	838	59.43%	246	17.45%	317	22.48%	9	0.64%	521	36.95%	1,410
Fredericksburg City	1,584	58.86%	962	35.75%	104	3.86%	41	1.52%	622	23.11%	2,691
Galax City	634	49.65%	592	46.36%	47	3.68%	4	0.31%	42	3.29%	1,277
Hampton City	5,205	51.81%	4,025	40.07%	724	7.21%	92	0.92%	1,180	11.75%	10,046
Harrisonburg City	1,122	46.13%	1,245	51.19%	50	2.06%	15	0.62%	-123	-5.06%	2,432
Hopewell City	2,262	56.96%	1,109	27.93%	551	13.88%	49	1.23%	1,153	29.04%	3,971
Lynchburg City	3,864	43.80%	3,422	38.79%	1,422	16.12%	112	1.27%	442	5.01%	8,820
Martinsville City	1,581	52.11%	1,168	38.50%	257	8.47%	28	0.92%	413	13.61%	3,034
Newport News City	7,264	56.30%	4,405	34.14%	1,059	8.21%	174	1.35%	2,859	22.16%	12,902
Norfolk City	12,419	52.74%	7,315	31.07%	3,663	15.56%	150	0.64%	5,104	21.68%	23,547
Norton City	343	48.79%	355	50.50%	1	0.14%	4	0.57%	-12	-1.71%	703
Petersburg City	2,790	58.72%	897	18.88%	1,047	22.04%	17	0.36%	1,743	36.69%	4,751
Portsmouth City	7,206	60.28%	2,639	22.08%	1,997	16.71%	112	0.94%	4,567	38.20%	11,954
Radford City	1,307	47.42%	1,335	48.44%	97	3.52%	17	0.62%	-28	-1.02%	2,756
Richmond City	18,032	55.27%	8,798	26.97%	5,613	17.21%	180	0.55%	9,234	28.31%	32,623
Roanoke City	5,888	35.12%	9,947	59.33%	816	4.87%	114	0.68%	-4,059	-24.21%	16,765
South Boston City	490	46.85%	323	30.88%	224	21.41%	9	0.86%	167	15.97%	1,046
Staunton City	2,062	50.51%	1,804	44.19%	173	4.24%	43	1.05%	258	6.32%	4,082
Suffolk City	1,453	71.05%	382	18.68%	204	9.98%	5	0.24%	1,071	52.37%	2,044
Virginia Beach City	6,224	54.43%	3,718	32.51%	1,445	12.64%	48	0.42%	2,506	21.92%	11,435
Waynesboro City	1,275	43.80%	1,499	51.49%	116	3.98%	21	0.72%	-224	-7.69%	2,911
Williamsburg City	479	45.40%	483	45.78%	85	8.06%	8	0.76%	-4	-0.38%	1,055
Winchester City	1,100	59.91%	675	36.76%	49	2.67%	12	0.65%	425	23.15%	1,836
Totals	269,526	47.89%	212,207	37.71%	75,307	13.38%	5,730	1.02%	57,319	10.18%	562,770

Counties and independent cities that flipped from Democratic to Conservative

- Amelia
- Brunswick
- Chesterfield
- Charlotte
- Lunenburg
- Mecklenberg
- Nottoway
- Powhatan
- Prince Edward
- Surry
- Sussex

Counties and independent cities that flipped from Democratic to Republican

- Arlington
- Augusta
- Botetourt
- Charles City
- Greene
- Greenesville
- Henrico
- Highland
- Montgomery
- Page
- Russell
- Rockbridge
- Washington
- Falls Church (independent city)
- Alexandria (independent city)
- Harrisonburg (independent city)
- Radford (independent city)
- Waynesboro (independent city)
- Norton (independent city)
- Williamsburg (independent city)

== Analysis ==
Godwin won the election with a plurality over Holton and Story. Story's strength – around four points greater than expected in pre-election polls that gave him nine percent of the total – mainly came at the expense of the Democrats as counties in the Piedmont that had been won by Democrats with over seventy percent shrank to forty percent or less. Godwin did best in the Tidewater Region, while Holton ran best in the traditionally Republican Shenandoah Valley and Southwest Virginia. Increased turnout due to the Twenty-fourth Amendment helped Godwin. Whereas previous Republican gubernatorial candidates had typically won majorities of a limited black vote reaching up to ninety percent, Godwin is thought to have won seventy-five percent of a black vote estimated at seventy thousand. (Note: This is less than half the estimated black vote in the state in the 1964 presidential election, more than ninety-five percent of which went to Democrat Lyndon Johnson.) Despite the fact that Holton had opposed Massive Resistance, the association of the Republicans with Barry Goldwater was fatal for his chances of winning the newly enfranchised African-Americans.

Godwin's success was based on a very unlikely coalition of liberals and conservatives: he would even get people of radically different ideologies to work for him in different localities – Armistead Boothe in Arlington and William Tuck in Danville.

Rockwell received 5,730 votes, slightly less than 1% of the total. While he was initially disappointed and shocked by his showing, only weeks later at a speech he spun it as a positive result, saying that

with a budget of $15,000, with a total press blackout, and with a 'Kosher conservative' [splitting the vote] ... I got 7,000 people to vote for a Nazi.

== Sources ==
- Simonelli, Frederick J. (1999). American Fuehrer: George Lincoln Rockwell and the American Nazi Party. Urbana: University of Illinois Press. ISBN 978-0-252-02285-2.
- Schmaltz, William H. (2000) [1999]. Hate: George Lincoln Rockwell and the American Nazi Party. Washington, D.C.: Brassey's. ISBN 978-1-57488-262-9.
