= Mills Godwin =

American politician

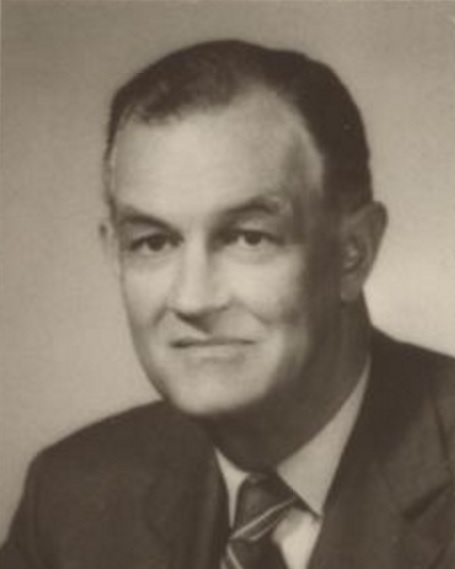
- Godwin in 1974

60th & 62nd Governor of Virginia
- In office January 12, 1974 – January 14, 1978
- Lieutenant: John N. Dalton
- Preceded by: Linwood Holton
- Succeeded by: John N. Dalton
- In office January 15, 1966 – January 17, 1970
- Lieutenant: Fred G. Pollard
- Preceded by: Albertis Harrison
- Succeeded by: Linwood Holton

28th Lieutenant Governor of Virginia
- In office January 13, 1962 – January 15, 1966
- Governor: Albertis Harrison
- Preceded by: Allie E. S. Stephens
- Succeeded by: Fred G. Pollard

Member of the Virginia Senate from the 5th district
- In office December 2, 1952 – January 10, 1962
- Preceded by: Allie E. S. Stephens
- Succeeded by: William V. Rawlings

Member of the Virginia House of Delegates for Nansemond and Suffolk
- In office January 14, 1948 – December 2, 1952
- Preceded by: Willis E. Cohoon
- Succeeded by: Willis E. Cohoon

Personal details
- Born: Mills Edwin Godwin Jr. November 19, 1914 Chuckatuck, Virginia, U.S.
- Died: January 30, 1999 (aged 84) Newport News, Virginia, U.S.
- Party: Republican (1973–1999)
- Other political affiliations: Democratic (before 1973)
- Spouse: Katherine Thomas Beale (m. 1940)
- Children: Becky Godwin
- Education: Old Dominion University; University of Virginia (LLB)
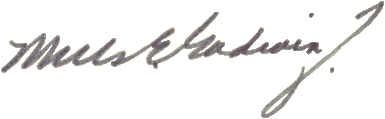
- Signature

Mills Edwin Godwin Jr. (November 19, 1914 – January 30, 1999) was an American politician who was the 60th and 62nd governor of Virginia for two non-consecutive terms, from 1966 to 1970 and from 1974 to 1978. Godwin was the first person to be elected governor of any state as a Democrat and a Republican. He is to date the last Virginia governor to serve two terms.

He was the last Virginia governor elected as a part of the Byrd Machine, the conservative Democratic establishment that dominated the state's politics for over three decades. He was succeeded by Linwood Holton, the first non-Democratic governor in over 80 years. By 1973, when he ran for a second term, Godwin had become a Republican, as the dominance of the Democrats in Virginia politics receded and the Byrd political machine had disintegrated.

== Early life and education ==
Godwin was born in the town of Chuckatuck in Nansemond County (now a neighborhood of Suffolk, Virginia), the son of Otelia Margaret (Darden) and Mills Edwin Godwin. He was educated at Old Dominion University and also received an LL.B. degree at the University of Virginia School of Law in 1940 .

== Career ==
Godwin served in the Senate of Virginia between 1952 and 1962 and as lieutenant governor between 1962 and 1966. In the state senate, Godwin was one of the leaders of the segregationist policy of "massive resistance", which aimed to prevent the implementation of federal court decisions requiring that black students be admitted to white schools under Brown v. Board of Education. However, during Virginia's cultural transition in the 1960s, he was one of many Byrd Democrats who distanced themselves from the extreme positions of Senator Harry F. Byrd Sr. and concluded that obstinate resistance to integration could not continue.

With an eye to the 1965 gubernatorial race, Godwin reached out to African American voters during the 1964 presidential campaign by campaigning for President Lyndon B. Johnson, who had led the movement for enactment of the Civil Rights Act of that year.

In 1965, Godwin took the Democratic nomination for governor unopposed, without a primary election. His support of President Johnson the previous year, however, lost him the support of the most die-hard segregationists, who bolted from the Democratic Party to support William J. Story Jr., the candidate of the short-lived Conservative Party of Virginia. Godwin's bid for governor in 1965 was endorsed by the local affiliates of both the NAACP and the AFL–CIO. Despite the third-party challenge, Godwin defeated Republican Linwood Holton, who would succeed him as governor in 1970, by a 48% to 36% margin. Story won 13 percent of the vote and American Nazi Party leader George Lincoln Rockwell won 1.02 percent as an independent.

After his first term ended in 1970, Godwin began to separate himself from the Democratic Party. He managed the U.S. Senate campaign of Harry F. Byrd Jr., who was running as an independent candidate. Godwin was denied a seat at the Democratic state convention in 1972, and he was a member in the Texas organization of "Democrats for Nixon", supporting Republican Richard Nixon over the Democratic presidential nominee, George McGovern.

Lieutenant Governor Henry Howell had been elected to his office against Democratic and Republican opposition as an independent in a 1971 special election following the death of incumbent J. Sargeant Reynolds; he ran as an independent for governor in 1973, as the Democrats failed to put up a candidate. Howell was a self-styled "populist", but many conservatives saw him simply as a liberal whose push to the governor's office they believed had to be stopped. Former governor Godwin was persuaded to run again by conservative Republicans who saw him as the most likely candidate to beat Howell. Although Godwin sought and won the Republican nomination, he did not declare that he had personally switched his party affiliation until his speech to the Republican convention in which he accepted his nomination "as one of you." Godwin narrowly defeated Howell by a margin of 14,972 votes, a 50.7% to 49.3% margin, to win his second term. The Virginia Constitution prohibits incumbent governors for running for consecutive reelection; Godwin became the only Virginia governor to be elected to two terms in the 20th century. In another historic note, Godwin became the last governor of Virginia for 40 years whose party held the Presidency at the time of election, a distinction that ended with the election of Democrat Terry McAuliffe as governor in 2013.

As governor, Godwin abandoned the state's "pay as you go" fiscal policy, which Virginia had followed since Harry F. Byrd's governorship, by having the state issue bonds to pay for capital projects.

In December 1975, Governor Godwin ordered the James River and its tributaries closed to fishing from Richmond to the Chesapeake Bay. This order was the result of improper handling of kepone and its dumping into the James. Kepone is a chemical pesticide that was produced by Allied Signal Company in Hopewell, Virginia and caused a nationwide pollution controversy.

In 1976, Governor Godwin supported the bid of President Gerald R. Ford Jr., for the Republican presidential nomination, against challenger Ronald Reagan. The Virginia Republican Party convention of that year, however, elected a largely pro-Reagan delegation to the 1976 Republican National Convention. However, as a courtesy Godwin was designated as co-chairman of the delegation, but was required to share the office with Reagan supporter Richard D. Obenshain. After the end of his second gubernatorial term, Godwin worked behind the scenes in the Virginia Republican Party until shortly before his death.

His personal papers, including papers from his time as governor, are held by the Special Collections Research Center at the College of William & Mary. His executive papers from his time as governor are held by the Library of Virginia.

== Personal life ==
He married Katherine Thomas Beale of Holland, also in Nansemond County. They adopted one child, Becky Godwin (1954–1968). In August 1968, while Governor Godwin was attending the Democratic National Convention in Chicago, Illinois, Becky and her mother were vacationing at the Oceanfront area of Virginia Beach when Becky was killed in a lightning accident.

The family resided in Godwin's hometown of Chuckatuck. In 1972, Nansemond County, including Chuckatuck, became the independent city of Nansemond. Only two years later, in 1974, Nansemond merged with neighboring Suffolk to form the modern city of Suffolk. It was the last of the cities of Hampton Roads to take their current form during a wave of political consolidations which began in 1952.

Godwin died in 1999 of pneumonia and is buried in Cedar Hill Cemetery in Suffolk.

== Legacy ==
His boyhood home, the Godwin–Knight House, was added to the National Register of Historic Places in 1985.

Two schools in Virginia were named for him, including Mills E. Godwin High School in suburban Henrico, where the Becky Godwin Memorial Award is given annually to a senior selected by classmates, and Godwin Middle School in Prince William County, which was later renamed to George Hampton Middle School amid much controversy in 2016. Godwin was a leader of the "massive resistance" movement, which used state laws to close schools rather than comply with federal orders to open them to black students. Godwin died in 1999, when he was 84, and never publicly apologized for his support of segregated schools.

Godwin Drive is located in the city of Manassas, Virginia. The administration building at Virginia Wesleyan University is named Katherine B. & Mills E. Godwin, Jr. Hall. The Psychology/Biology building on the campus of Old Dominion University is named Mills Godwin Life Science Building. The former student center at Norfolk State University was also named in his honor. The building was demolished in early 2010 as a modern student center opened on campus. The Godwin Building on the Northern Virginia Community College, Annandale campus is also named for him. A Becky Godwin Memorial Scholarship is also given to college students at Godwin's former church, Oakland Christian Church, in Chuckatuck, Virginia. The church also dedicated a section of the church to Godwin known as the Godwin Building. Godwin Hall on the campus of James Madison University was completed in 1972 and was dedicated in honor of Godwin and his wife Katherine, who was a graduate of the university.

Party political offices
Preceded by Albertis Harrison	Democratic nominee for Governor of Virginia; 1965	Succeeded by William C. Battle
Preceded by Linwood Holton	Republican nominee for Governor of Virginia; 1973	Succeeded by John N. Dalton
Political offices
Preceded by Allie E. S. Stephens	Lieutenant Governor of Virginia; January 13, 1962 – January 15, 1966	Succeeded by Fred G. Pollard
Preceded by Albertis S. Harrison Jr.	Governor of Virginia; January 15, 1966 – January 17, 1970	Succeeded by A. Linwood Holton Jr.
Preceded by A. Linwood Holton Jr.	Governor of Virginia; January 12, 1974 – January 14, 1978	Succeeded by John N. Dalton
