= 1989 United States elections =

- ← 1987 1988 1989 1990 1991 → Off-year elections
- Election day: November 7

House elections
- Seats contested: 8 mid-term vacancies
- Net seat change: Democratic +1

Gubernatorial elections
- Seats contested: 2
- Net seat change: Democratic +1
- 1989 gubernatorial election results map

Legend
- Democratic gain Democratic hold No election

Elections were held in the United States on November 7, 1989, consisting of two gubernatorial races, eight House special elections, and many local elections. No Senate special elections were held.

== Federal elections ==
=== United States House of Representatives special elections ===
In 1989, eight special elections were held to fill vacancies to the United States Congress. They were for Alabama's 3rd congressional district, Indiana's 4th congressional district, Wyoming's at-large congressional district, Florida's 18th congressional district, California's 15th congressional district, Texas's 12th congressional district, Texas's 18th congressional district and Mississippi's 5th congressional district.

District	Incumbent			This race	
District	Member	Party	First elected	Results	Candidates
Alabama 3	Bill Nichols	Democratic	1966	Incumbent died December 13, 1988. New member elected April 4, 1989. Democratic hold.	▌ ✓ Glen Browder (Democratic) 65.29%; ▌John Rice (Republican) 34.71%
Indiana 4	Dan Coats	Republican	1980	Incumbent resigned January 3, 1989, to become U.S. Senator. New member elected March 28, 1989. Democratic gain.	▌ ✓ Jill Long (Democratic) 50.69%; ▌Dan Heath (Republican) 49.31%
Wyoming at-large	Dick Cheney	Republican	1978	Incumbent resigned March 17, 1989, to become U.S. Secretary of Defense. New member elected April 26, 1989. Republican hold.	▌ ✓ Craig L. Thomas (Republican) 52.55%; ▌John Vinich (Democratic) 42.98%
Florida 18	Claude Pepper	Democratic	1962	Incumbent died May 30, 1989. New member elected August 29, 1989. Republican gain.	▌ ✓ Ileana Ros-Lehtinen (Republican) 53.14%; ▌Gerald Richman (Democratic) 46.85%
California 15	Tony Coelho	Democratic	1978	Incumbent resigned June 15, 1989. New member elected September 12, 1989. Democratic hold.	▌ ✓ Gary Condit (Democratic) 57.15%; ▌Clare L. Berryhill (Republican) 35.03%; ▌Robert J. Weimer (Republican) 3.26%; ▌Cliff Burris (Republican) 2.64%
Texas 12	Jim Wright	Democratic	1954	Incumbent resigned June 30, 1989. New member elected September 12, 1989. Democratic hold.	▌ ✓ Pete Geren (Democratic) 51.03%; ▌Bob Lanier (Democratic) 48.97%
Texas 18	Mickey Leland	Democratic	1978	Incumbent died August 7, 1989. New member elected December 9, 1989. Democratic hold.	▌ ✓ Craig Washington (Democratic) 56.8%; ▌Anthony Hall (Democratic) 43.2%
Mississippi 5	Larkin I. Smith	Republican	1988	Incumbent died August 13, 1989. New member elected October 17, 1989. Democratic gain.	▌ ✓ Gene Taylor (Democratic) 65%; ▌Tom Anderson (Republican) 35%

== State and local elections ==
Several statewide elections were held in 1989, most notably the gubernatorial elections in two U.S. States and one U.S. territory.

=== Gubernatorial elections ===
Two gubernatorial elections were held in 1989 in New Jersey and the Commonwealth of Virginia. The Democratic Party won both elections, flipping the New Jersey governor's office. A territorial gubernatorial race also was held in the Northern Mariana Islands, won by the Republican candidate.

State	Incumbent	Party	First elected	Result	Candidates
New Jersey	Thomas Kean	Republican	1981	Incumbent term-limited. New governor elected. Democratic gain.	✓ James Florio (Democratic) 61.2%; Jim Courter (Republican) 37.2%; Dan Karlan (Libertarian) .53%; Michael Ziruolo (Independent) .45%; Tom Fuscaldo (Independent) .31%; Catherine Renee Sedwick (Socialist Workers) .28%
Virginia	Gerald Baliles	Democratic	1985	Incumbent term-limited. New governor elected. Democratic hold.	✓ Douglas Wilder (Democratic) 50.1%; Marshall Coleman (Republican) 49.8%
