= 1989 United States gubernatorial elections =

- November 7, 1989

3 governorships 2 states; 1 territory
	Majority party	Minority party
Party	Democratic	Republican
Seats before	28	22
Seats after	29	21
Seat change	▲1	▼1
Seats up	1	1
Seats won	2	0
- 1989 gubernatorial election results: Democratic gain Democratic hold Republican hold

United States gubernatorial elections were held on November 7, 1989, in two states and one territory, as well as other statewide offices and members of state legislatures. Democrats picked up the open seat in New Jersey formerly held by a Republican, while keeping another open seat in Virginia which was held by a Democrat.

== Election results ==
State	Incumbent	Party	First elected	Result	Candidates
New Jersey	Thomas Kean	Republican	1981	Incumbent term-limited. New governor elected. Democratic gain.	✓ James Florio (Democratic) 61.2%; Jim Courter (Republican) 37.2%; Dan Karlan (Libertarian) .53%; Michael Ziruolo (Independent) .45%; Tom Fuscaldo (Independent) .31%; Catherine Renee Sedwick (Socialist Workers) .28%
Virginia	Gerald Baliles	Democratic	1985	Incumbent term-limited. New governor elected. Democratic hold.	✓ Douglas Wilder (Democratic) 50.1%; Marshall Coleman (Republican) 49.8%

== Close states ==
States where the margin of victory was under 1%:

1. Virginia, 0.38%

== New Jersey ==
1989 New Jersey gubernatorial election
- November 7, 1989
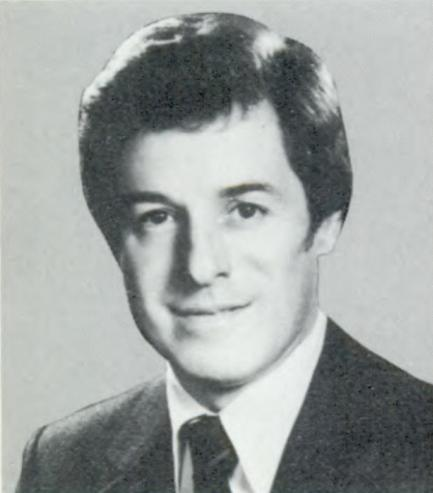

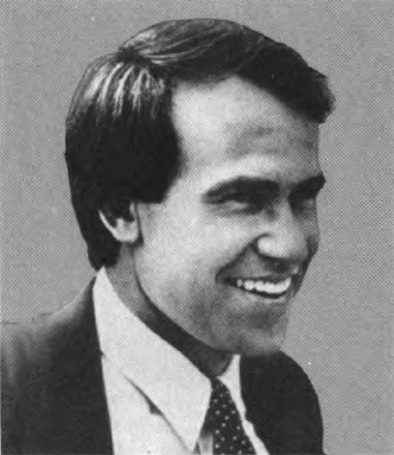
Nominee	James Florio	Jim Courter
Party	Democratic	Republican
Popular vote	1,379,937	838,553
Percentage	61.2%	37.2%
- Florio: 50–60% 60–70% 70–80% 80–90% Courter: 50–60%
Governor before election
Thomas Kean
Republican
Elected Governor
James Florio
Democratic

The 1989 New Jersey gubernatorial election was held on November 7, 1989. Incumbent Republican Governor Thomas Kean was term-limited after two consecutive terms. Democrat James Florio, a U.S. Representative from Camden County and a twice-unsuccessful candidate for Governor, defeated Republican U.S. Representative Jim Courter by the lopsided margin of 61.2%-37.2%.

== Virginia ==
1989 Virginia gubernatorial election
- November 7, 1989
- Turnout: 66.5% (voting eligible)
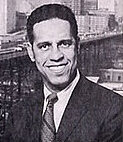

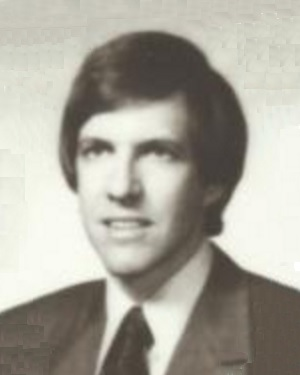
Nominee	Douglas Wilder	Marshall Coleman
Party	Democratic	Republican
Popular vote	896,936	890,195
Percentage	50.13%	49.76%
- Wilder: 50–60% 60–70% 70–80% Coleman: 50–60% 60–70% 70–80%
Governor before election
Jerry Baliles
Democratic
Elected Governor
Douglas Wilder
Democratic

The 1989 Virginia gubernatorial election was held on November 7, 1989. Incumbent Democratic governor Jerry Baliles was unable to seek a second term due to term limits. Democratic nominee and Lieutenant Governor L. Douglas Wilder went against former attorney general of Virginia J. Marshall Coleman in one of the closest elections in Virginia history. Upon taking the oath of office in January 1990, Governor Wilder became the first African-American governor of Virginia, and the first African-American governor of any state since Reconstruction more than one hundred years earlier.
