= 1988 Alabama Democratic presidential primary =

- March 8, 1988

65 Democratic National Convention delegates (56 pledged, 9 unpledged)
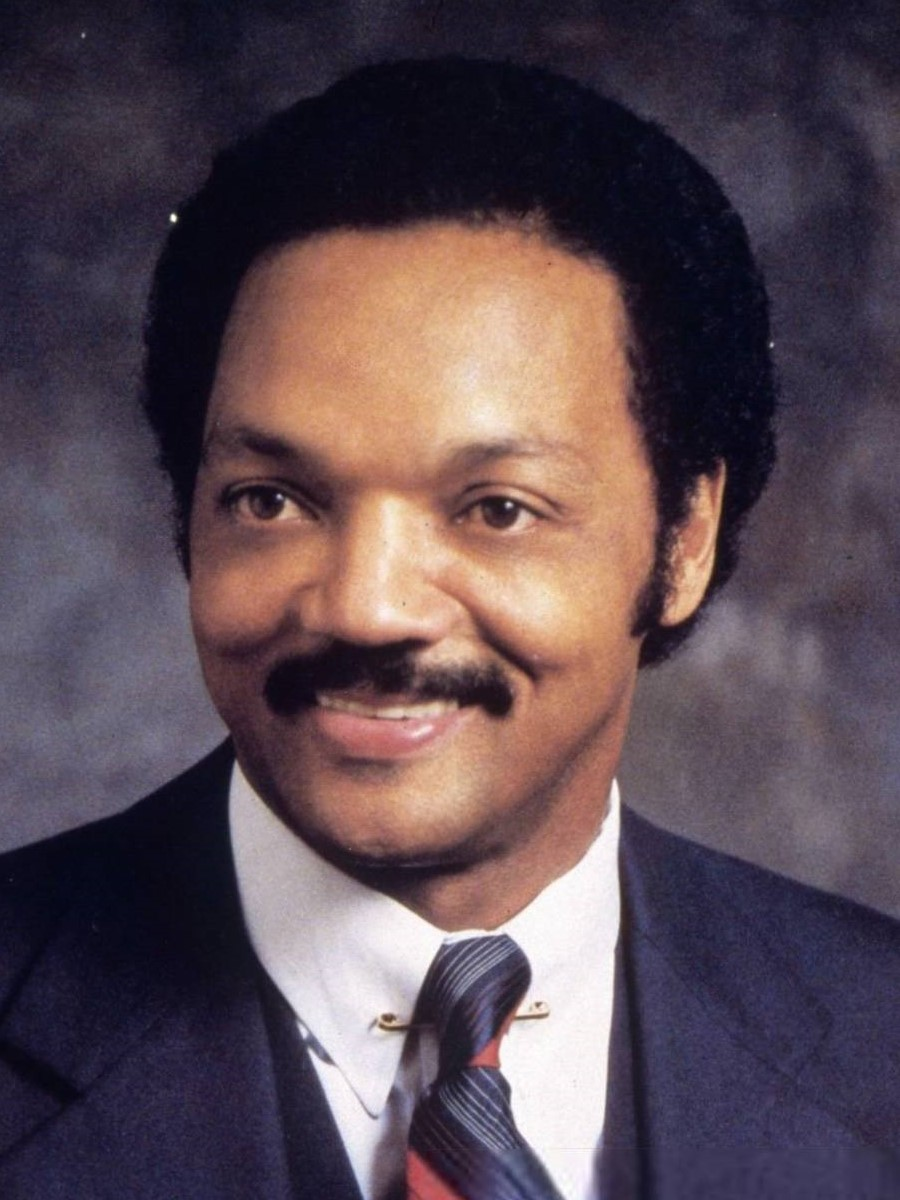

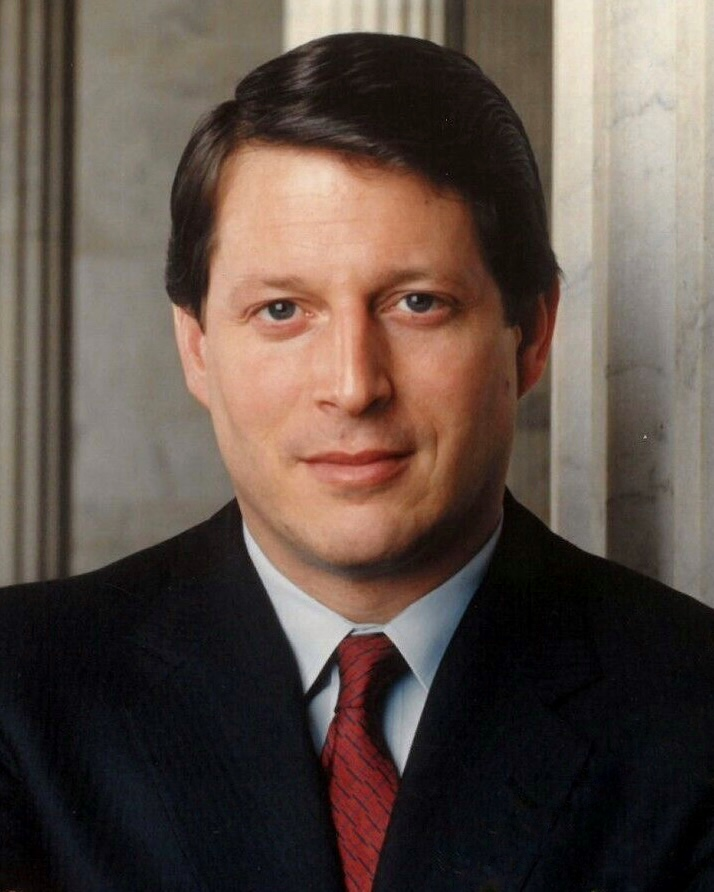

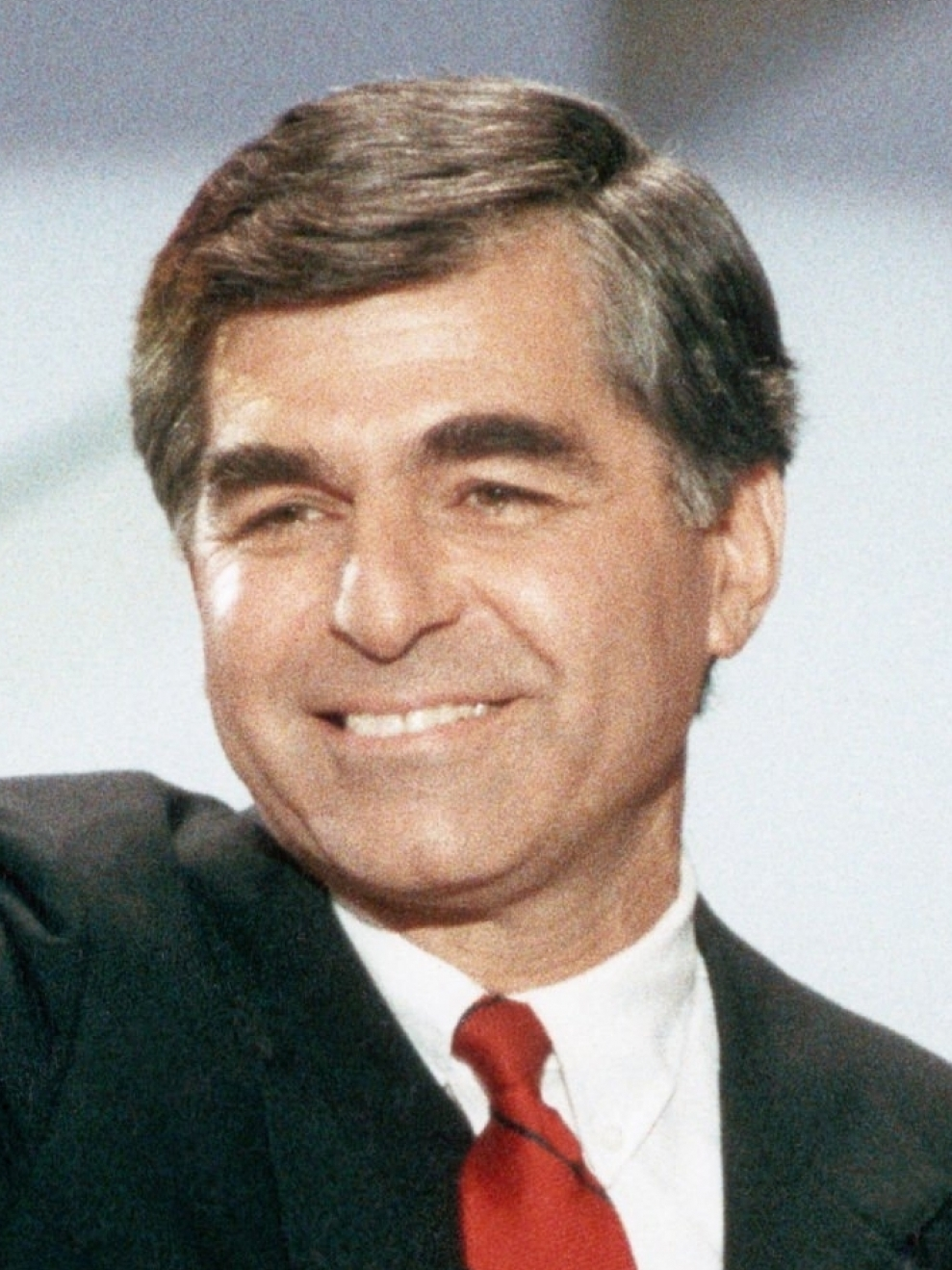

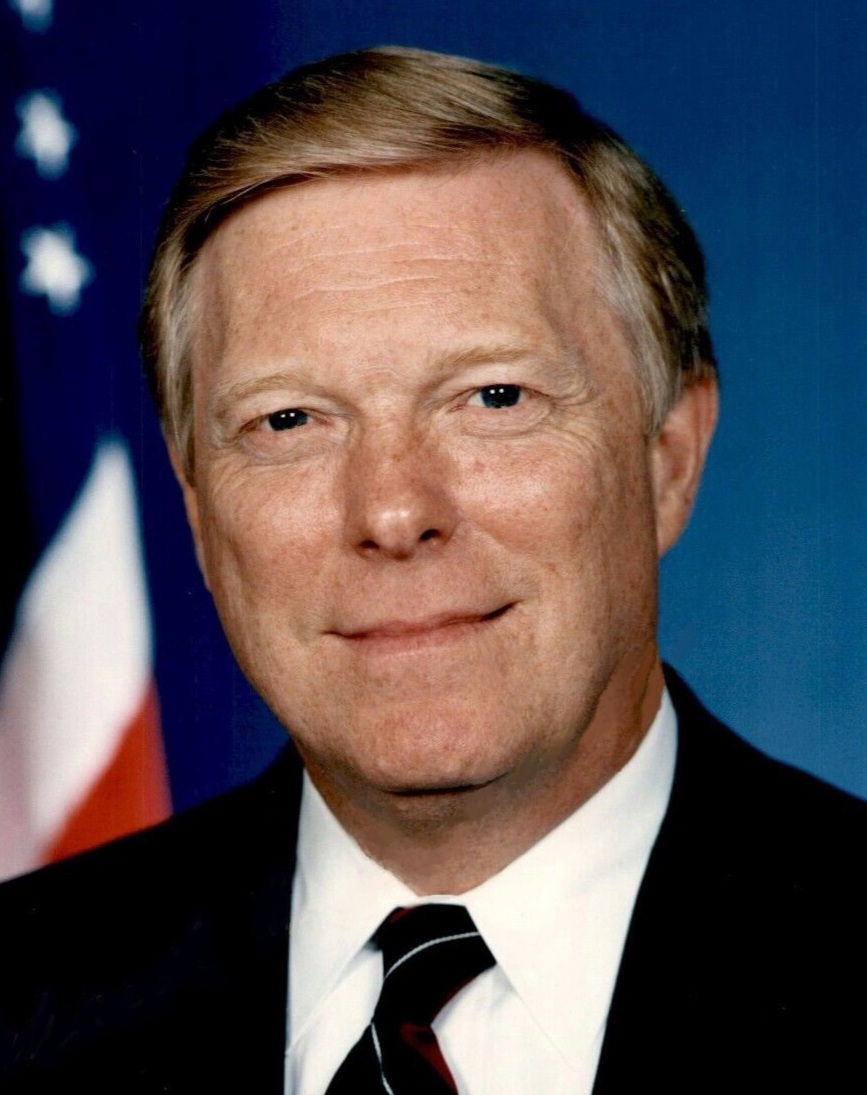
Candidate	Jesse Jackson	Al Gore
Home state	South Carolina	Tennessee
Delegate count	28	28
Popular vote	176,764	151,739
Percentage	43.56%	37.39%
Candidate	Michael Dukakis	Dick Gephardt
Home state	Massachusetts	Missouri
Delegate count	0	0
Popular vote	31,206	30,214
Percentage	7.69%	7.44%

Jackson
30–40%
40–50%
50–60%
60–70%
70–80%
80–90%
90–100%
Gore
30–40%
40–50%
50–60%
60–70%
70–80%

A presidential primary was held in the U.S. state of Alabama on March 8, 1988, to elect delegates representing Alabama to the 1988 Democratic National Convention. Alabama was allocated sixty-five delegates, fifty-six of which were pledged. Thirty-seven delegates were elected from the seven congressional districts and the remaining nineteen were chosen by the State Democratic Executive Committee to reflect candidates' statewide vote totals. Nine delegates were unpledged delegates, or "superdelegates," made up of five party officers and four congressmen.

Jesse Jackson of South Carolina won more statewide votes than Al Gore of Tennessee, but both took the same number of delegates, twenty-eight, to the Convention, due to Gore's strength in the state's congressional districts. Later in the campaign, Gore withdrew his bid for the nomination and released his delegates while urging them to support Massachusetts governor Michael Dukakis. Dukakis won the support of every superdelegate and Gore delegate, and at the Convention, Alabama cast thirty-seven votes for Dukakis to Jackson's twenty-eight.

== Results ==
Alabama Democratic presidential primary, 1988
Candidate	Popular vote		Delegates		
Candidate	#	%	Pledged	Unpledged	Total
Jesse Jackson	176,764	43.56%	28		0
Al Gore	151,739	37.39%	28		0
Michael Dukakis	31,206	7.69%	0		0
Dick Gephardt	30,214	7.44%	0		0
Gary Hart	7,518	1.85%	0		0
Paul Simon	3,063	0.75%	0		0
Bruce Babbitt	2,410	0.59%	0		0
Lyndon LaRouche	845	0.21%	0		0
Uncommitted	2,072	0.51%	0		0
Total	405,831	100.00%	56	9	65

=== Delegate allocation ===
District	Al Gore	Jesse Jackson	Total
1st	2	3	5
2nd	2	3	5
3rd	2	3	5
4th	6	0	6
5th	4	1	5
6th	1	4	5
7th	2	4	6
CD total	19	18	37
At-large	9	10	19
Total	28	28	56
Source: Associated Press

== See also ==
- 1988 Democratic Party presidential primaries
- 1988 United States presidential election
- 1988 United States presidential election in Alabama
- 1988 United States elections
