= Wyatt Durrette =

Wyatt Durrette may refer to:

- Wyatt Durrette (politician) (born 1938), American lawyer and politician
- Wyatt Durrette (songwriter) (born 1974), American country music songwriter and singer, son of the above
