= Ben McGee (politician) =

Former Arkansas politician

Ben McGee is a former state legislator in Arkansas. He was a Democrat. He supported Bill Clinton’s African American rival Douglas Wilder in his campaign for the Democrat Party's nomination for U.S. president.

He was first elected in 1988. In 1998, he resigned after pleading guilty to extortion charges.
