= 1994 United States Senate election in Virginia =

- November 8, 1994
- Turnout: 43.6% (voting eligible)
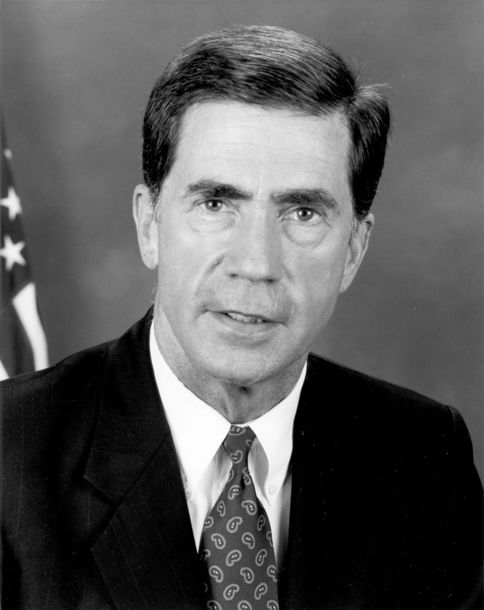

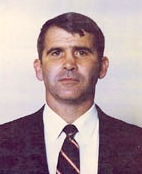

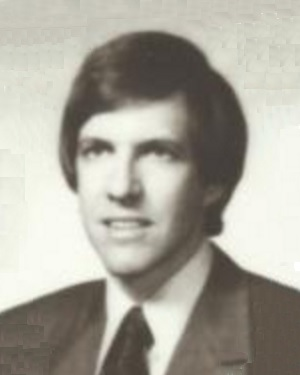
Nominee	Chuck Robb	Oliver North	Marshall Coleman
Party	Democratic	Republican	Independent
Popular vote	938,376	882,213	235,324
Percentage	45.61%	42.88%	11.44%
- Robb: 40–50% 50–60% 60–70% 70–80% North: 40–50% 50–60% 60–70%
U.S. senator before election
Chuck Robb
Democratic
Elected U.S. Senator
Chuck Robb
Democratic

The 1994 United States Senate election in Virginia was held November 8, 1994. Incumbent Democratic U.S. Senator Chuck Robb won re-election to a second term versus Republican nominee Oliver North, a Marine Corps veteran famous for his role in the Iran–Contra affair.

Robb ultimately won by a 45.6% to 42.9% margin, with Marshall Coleman, a former Republican state attorney general of Virginia, taking 11.4% as an independent candidate.

== Background and campaign ==
=== Campaign ===
Oliver North was a very controversial figure as he was involved in the Iran-Contra Affair, a scandal during Ronald Reagan's presidency where he had asserted that he was merely following orders from superiors. He faced James C. Miller III for the Republican nomination. On March 16, 1994, a letter was solicited by former Senator Paul Laxalt and released by Miller that came from Reagan, which stated among the following, "I'm getting pretty steamed about the statements coming from Oliver North." It was the only statement Reagan made on the race. North defeated Miller in June for the party nomination with over 55% of the vote. The questions about North's credibility would be a constant issue for the duration of the campaign. On the Democrat side however, Robb was not assured of an easy path to re-election, as he had admitted to questionable behavior before and during his term as Senator. Marshall Coleman, a former state Attorney General, attempted to seize the middle ground between Robb and North and ran as an independent. Republican Senator John Warner of Virginia endorsed Marshall Coleman, declaring North "unfit" for public service.

Douglas Wilder, the first black governor of Virginia, who served from 1990 to 1994, originally entered the Senate race in June as an independent before dropping out in September after polls showed him with favoring of less than 15% in a four-man ballot. In the last weeks of the election, Wilder started to campaign for Robb.

In his failed bid to unseat Robb, North raised $20.3 million in a single year through nationwide direct mail solicitations, telemarketing, fundraising events, and contributions from major donors. About $16 million of that amount was from direct mail alone. This was the biggest accumulation of direct mail funds for a statewide campaign to that date, and it made North the top direct mail political fundraiser in the country in 1994. In contrast, by late October, Robb had raised just $4.5 million, and Coleman had raised just over $400,000.

On October 27 (less than two weeks before the election), former First Lady Nancy Reagan made a rare public speaking appearance that was videotaped. When asked about North, she stated that North had lied to her husband when discussing Iran-Contra with the former president, which came with the polls showing North in a tie with Robb. North, labeled as usually combative in his rhetoric, stated the following soon after: "My mom told me a long time ago not to get into a fight with a lady. Nothing is going to change the fact that I think Ronald Reagan is the greatest president of my lifetime and maybe the greatest president we've ever had." The statement by Reagan was stated later as key in hurting North's image, particularly with Republican women.

North's candidacy was documented in the 1996 film A Perfect Candidate. In a race declared by one historian as "the two most unpopular party nominees in this state's history", Robb defeated North by a narrow margin.

== Democratic primary ==
=== Candidates ===
- Sylvia Clute
- Virgil Goode, state senator from Rocky Mount
- Chuck Robb, incumbent senator since 1989
- Nancy Spannaus, Lyndon LaRouche movement activist

=== Convention ===
1994 Virginia Democratic convention
Party	Candidate	Votes	%
Democratic	Chuck Robb (incumbent)	543	49.86%
Democratic	Virgil Goode	240	22.04%
Democratic	Douglas Wilder (draft effort)	189	17.36%
Democratic	Sylvia Clute	61	5.60%
Democratic	Nancy Spannaus	56	5.14%
Total votes		1,089	100.00%

There was an attempt to draft Governor Doug Wilder to run against Robb, but he chose to run as an independent candidate.

=== Primary ===
1994 Democratic U.S. Senate primary
Party	Candidate	Votes	%
Democratic	Chuck Robb (incumbent)	154,561	57.90%
Democratic	Virgil Goode	90,547	33.92%
Democratic	Sylvia Clute	17,329	6.49%
Democratic	Nancy Spannaus	4,507	1.69%
Total votes		266,944	100.00%

== Republican primary ==
=== Candidates ===
- James C. Miller III, former Director of the Office of Management and Budget
- Oliver North, Marine Corps veteran

=== Convention ===
North won a majority of the vote at the convention. He was not opposed in the primary.

== General election ==
=== Candidates ===
- J. Marshall Coleman, former Virginia attorney general and Republican candidate for governor in 1989 (Independent)
- Chuck Robb, incumbent senator (Democratic)
- Oliver North, Marine Corps veteran and figure in the Iran-Contra affair (Republican)
- Douglas Wilder, outgoing governor of Virginia (Independent) (withdrew)

=== Polling ===
Source	Date	Chuck Robb (D)	Oliver North (R)	Marshall Coleman (I)	Douglas Wilder (I)
Mason-Dixon	November 1–2, 1994	37%	36%	17%	
Richmond Times-Dispatch	October 31 – November 3, 1994	39%	31%	12%	
Roanoke College	October 27–30, 1994	39%	35%	14%	
Mason-Dixon	October 15–17, 1994	33%	37%	16%	
Mason-Dixon	September 22–24, 1994	33%	35%	18%	
Mason-Dixon	September 8–11, 1994	33%	28%	15%	12%
Virginia Commonwealth University	July 7–15, 1994	29%	29%	11%	16%

=== Results ===
United States Senate election in Virginia, 1994
Party	Candidate	Votes	%	±%
Democratic	Chuck Robb (Incumbent)	938,376	45.61%	−25.64%
Republican	Oliver North	882,213	42.88%	+14.18%
Independent	J. Marshall Coleman	235,324	11.44%	
Independent	L. Douglas Wilder (withdrew)	113	0.01%	
Write-ins		1,437	0.07%	+0.01%
Majority		56,163	2.73%	−39.83%
Turnout		2,057,463		
Democratic hold		Swing		

== See also ==
- 1994 United States Senate elections
