= Richmond Newspapers, Inc. v. Virginia =

Richmond Newspapers Inc. v. Virginia
- Supreme Court of the United States

Argued February 19, 1980 Decided July 2, 1980
- Full case name: Richmond Newspapers Inc. v. Virginia
- Docket no.: 79-243
- Citations: 448 U.S. 555 (more) 100 S. Ct. 2814; 65 L. Ed. 2d 973
- Argument: Oral argument

Case history
- Subsequent: None

Holding
- Closing of the trial to the public in this case was unconstitutional.

Court membership
- Chief Justice Warren E. Burger Associate Justices William J. Brennan Jr. · Potter Stewart; Byron White · Thurgood Marshall; Harry Blackmun · Lewis F. Powell Jr. William Rehnquist · John P. Stevens

Case opinions
- Plurality: Burger, joined by White, Stevens
- Concurrence: Brennan, joined by Marshall
- Concurrence: Stewart
- Concurrence: Blackmun
- Concurrence: White
- Concurrence: Stevens
- Dissent: Rehnquist
- Powell took no part in the consideration or decision of the case.

Laws applied
- First Amendment to the United States Constitution Sixth Amendment to the United States Constitution Fourteenth Amendment to the United States Constitution

Richmond Newspapers Inc. v. Virginia, 448 U.S. 555 (1980), is a United States Supreme Court case involving issues of privacy in correspondence with the First Amendment to the United States Constitution, the freedom of the press, the Sixth Amendment to the United States Constitution and the Fourteenth Amendment to the United States Constitution. After a murder case ended in three mistrials, the judge closed the fourth trial to the public and the press. On appeal, the Supreme Court ruled the closing to be in violation of the First Amendment and Fourteenth Amendment asserting that the First Amendment implicitly guarantees the press access to public trials.

== Background ==
At about 6:00pm on December 2, 1975, the body of Lillian M. Keller, the manager of the Holly Court Motel, was found stabbed to death in her apartment. Howard Franklin Bittorf, a resident in the motel at the time of the murder, and his brother-in-law, John Paul Stevenson were indicted on March 16, 1976, by the Commonwealth of Virginia grand jury for Hanover county for the murder.

== Prior litigation ==
On July 16, 1976, a Hanover County Circuit Court jury found Stevenson guilty of second-degree murder. On appeal, on October 7, 1977, Stevenson's conviction was overturned by the Virginia Supreme Court due to issues of hearsay and inconclusive forensic test results. On May 30, 1978, during Stevenson's second trial, a juror requested to be excused and no alternate was obtainable. Stevenson's second trial was declared a mistrial. On June 6, 1978, Stevenson's third trial was also declared a mistrial because a potential juror revealed information about Stevenson's previous trials to other potential jurors. On September 11, 1978, Stevenson's fourth trial began. The defense filed a motion for the trial to be closed to the press and public, in order to protect Stevenson's right to a fair trial, without any objections from the prosecution or the two Richmond Newspaper reporters present. Judge Richard H. C. Taylor acting in accordance with a state statute which "authorizes the court in its discretion to exclude from the trial any persons whose presence would impair the conduct of a fair trial" granted the motion and ordered the courtroom to be cleared of all unnecessary parties, including the Richmond reporters.

Later that same day, however, Richmond Newspapers requested "a hearing on a motion to vacate the closure order" arguing that there was no significant evidence supporting closure and that the judge did not consider any alternative measures to ensure a fair trial. The trial judge denied the motion and, therefore, ordered closure. Afterwards, Stevenson's fourth trial continued, without the presence of the public, press, or jury. The trial judge found Stevenson, not guilty.

On November 8, 1978, the newspaper filed an appeal with the Virginia Supreme Court, asking the court to find the closing of the Stevenson trial to be in error. The Virginia Supreme Court, on July 9, 1979, dismissed the appeal, citing a recent United States Supreme Court decision in Gannett v. DePasquale. Issued just a week prior, the decision held that there is "no public right to a public trial." Considering the confusion that the Gannett v. DePasquale ruling caused, along with an increase in courtroom closings, many other press organizations joined Richmond Newspapers as they brought their case to the United States Supreme Court.

== Supreme Court ==
=== Argument ===
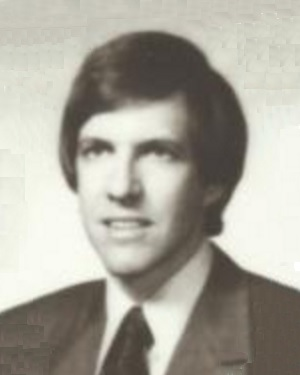
J. Marshall Coleman, Attorney General of Virginia, argued for the appellees before the Supreme Court.

Richmond Newspapers, Inc. appealed the Virginia Supreme Court's decision to the United States Supreme Court. Oral Argument took place on February 2, 1980, with Laurence H. Tribe arguing on behalf of Richmond Newspapers and J. Marshall Coleman, the Attorney General of Virginia at the time, arguing on behalf of Virginia, et al.

In his opening argument, Laurence Tribe asserted that the reasons given by the court to close the trial (including the layout of the courtroom and the possibility of prejudicial information affecting the impartiality of the jury) were not compelling enough to order closure. Additionally, Tribe argued that the trial judge had not utilized nor considered other, less drastic alternatives to ensure the fairness of the trial. Subsequently, Tribe claimed that the Virginia statute, which authorized the trial judge in this case to close off the entire trial to the press and public, was unconstitutional, violating the Sixth Amendment, which grants the right to a public trial, the Fourteenth Amendment, which protects citizenship rights, and the freedom of the press clause of the First Amendment.

In his oral argument, Coleman asserted that the amendments in question, particularly the Sixth Amendment, were in place to protect the accused, not the public. Furthermore, Coleman argued that the statute in question was, indeed, constitutional because, acting in accordance with the statute, the prosecutor, the judge, and the defense counsel, "two of whom are charged with representing the public interest," all agreed to the closure. He also went on to say that tapes of the fourth Stevenson trial became available to the public after the completion of the trial, although Tribe later refuted that "a violation of publicity is not rectified by the existence of a tape recording."

After Coleman concluded, Tribe returned to continue his oral argument. On the matter of overruling Gannett, Tribe contended that such a measure was unnecessary as the ruling in Gannett was applicable to pretrial suppression hearings, while the Richmond case referred to trials, not pretrials. He concluded his argument by stating that a "standard of compelling need" is needed in order for a judge to close a trial to the press and public.

=== Decision ===
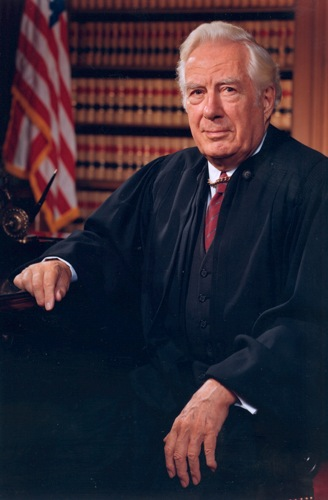
Chief Justice Warren E. Burger wrote the opinion of the Court.

In July 1980, the Court determined in a 7-1 decision in favor of Richmond Newspapers, Inc. Chief Justice Warren E. Burger wrote the opinion of the Court. Joined by Justice Byron White and Justice John Paul Stevens, Justice Burger began the opinion with a thorough review of the history and concept of a public trial, explaining that, traditionally, courts have been open to "all who care to observe." The Court then went on to discuss the merit of a Constitutional argument for a public trial:

The State argued that the Constitution and Bill of Rights do not contain any explicit provisions which guarantee the public a right to access. The Court said that the First and Fourteenth Amendment expressly guarantee freedom of speech, freedom of the press and the right to public assembly, share a common purpose of assuring freedom of communication on matters relating to the functioning of government and were enacted against the backdrop of the long history of trials being presumptively open. Therefore ‘the First Amendment guarantees of speech and press, standing alone, prohibit government from summarily closing courtroom doors which had long been open to the public at the time the Amendment was adopted.

Justice Burger chose not to make a case for the public's Sixth Amendment right to a public trial, unlike Justice Harry Blackmun in his Gannett decision. The Court concluded its opinion by stating "The right to attend criminal trials is implicit in the guarantees of the First Amendment; without the freedom to attend such trials, which people have exercised for centuries, important aspects of freedom of speech and of the press could be eviscerated."

==== Concurrences ====
Justice White, despite joining the majority opinion, wrote separately to state that this particular case would have been unnecessary had the Gannett decision been narrower, forbidding the exclusion of the public from criminal trials in more specifically tailored circumstances.

Justice Stevens, who also joined the majority opinion, wrote separately to "emphasize that until this decision the Court had accorded virtually absolute protection to the dissemination of information or ideas, but never before had it squarely held that the acquisition of newsworthy matter is entitled to any constitutional protection whatsoever."

Justice William J. Brennan also wrote a concurrence, which was joined by Justice Thurgood Marshall. Justice Brennan noted that there is a right for the public to attend trials implicitly stated in the Constitution and that alone signifies that a trial judge or other parties cannot constitutionally close off a trial to the public.

Justice Potter Stewart, on the other hand, concurred that the right of public access to trials is not always guaranteed and certain circumstances may justify a limitation on the unrestricted presence of the public at the trial. He continued to state, however, "in this case the trial judge failed to recognize the right of the press and public to be present."

Justice Harry Blackmun wrote separately, arguing that there is a Sixth Amendment argument to be made for the right of a public trial.

==== Dissent ====
Justice William Rehnquist filed a dissent finding that there is no explicit guarantee for public access to the courtroom in the Constitution and, therefore, "if the prosecution and the defense find that they have adequate reasons to close a trial to the public, this should be upheld by the Courts."

== See also ==
- Time, Inc. v. Hill (1967)
- Cox Broadcasting Corp. v. Cohn (1975)
- Florida Star v. B. J. F. (1989)
