= Wyatt Durrette (politician) =

American politician (1938–2025)

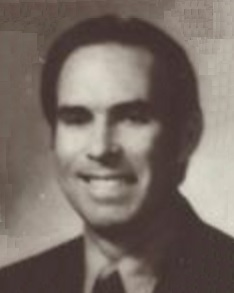

Member of the Virginia House of Delegates from the 18th district
- In office January 12, 1972 – January 11, 1978
- Preceded by: Clive L. DuVal II
- Succeeded by: Martin H. Perper

Personal details
- Born: Wyatt Beazley Durrette Jr. February 21, 1938 Richmond, Virginia, U.S.
- Died: September 30, 2025 (aged 87) Urbanna, Virginia, U.S.
- Party: Republican
- Spouse(s): Cheryn Durrette Monica Durrette (m. 1993)
- Children: 7, including Wyatt III
- Education: Virginia Military Institute (BS); Washington and Lee University (LLB); Johns Hopkins University (MA)

Military service
- Allegiance: United States
- Branch/service: United States Air Force
- Years of service: 1966–1968
- Rank: Captain
- Battles/wars: Vietnam War

Wyatt Beazley Durrette Jr. (February 21, 1938 – September 30, 2025) was an American attorney and politician. He served three terms in the Virginia House of Delegates as a Republican, from 1972 to 1978, and was the party's unsuccessful nominee for governor of Virginia in 1985.

== Early and family life ==
Born in Richmond, Virginia on February 21, 1938, Durrette was raised in Franklin (in the Hampton Roads area, and attended an all-white high school during Massive Resistance. He was captain of the baseball, basketball and football teams, but was kicked off the basketball team for working an afternoon before a game in a clothing store and refusing to follow the coach's order to apologize to his team.

While his father helped build chemical plants for DuPont, Durrette moved to Staunton and lived with aunts while attending the Virginia Military Institute. He graduated with a B.S. in Mathematics, but also remembered incurring many demerits for wearing his hair long and failing to shine his shoes. Durrette then attended the Washington and Lee University Law School and founded the school's Conservative Society as well as irregularly published a newspaper called The Southern Conservative. He received his LL.B. degree cum laude, and then planned to teach political science, attending the Johns Hopkins University and receiving a M.A. in political science.

During the Vietnam War, Captain Durrette served in the U.S. Air Force as a lawyer, assigned to California and SEA (1966–68). He later became active in the Veterans of Foreign Wars.

He married Cheryn Durrette and had seven children, living in Fairfax after his military service, then moving to the Richmond suburbs in 1985. His son, Wyatt Durrette III would drop out of VMI, but by 2012 became a successful country songwriter. Durette said that he was raised by strict Southern Baptist parents, later attended a Protestant church, and by 1985 occasionally attended Catholic services with his wife.

Durrette died on September 30, 2025, at the age of 87.

== Legal career ==
After admission to the Virginia bar and the end of his military service, Durrette established his private legal practice in Fairfax, Virginia. He became active in the Virginia State, American, Fairfax County and Northern Virginia Jr. Bar Associations, as well as Virginia Trial Lawyers Association. Durrette also became vice president and part owner of American Defense Systems Inc., a Northern Virginia Navy contractor supplying "sophisticated weaponry," and also became vice president of a property management company owning a newly refurbished Richmond hotel. He also was a past director of the Vienna Jaycees and legal counsel to that nonprofit. He also served on the boards of directors of Project Concern, Inc., Northern Virginia chapter of Reading is Fundamental, Inc., and the Northern Virginia Association for Retarded Children, as well as on the advisory committee of the State office on Volunteerism.

During his run for statewide office in 1985, as described below, Durrette moved to Richmond, where as of 2022, he worked on complex litigation for Durrette Crump PLC.

== Political career ==
Fairfax County voters elected Durrette to represent them (part time) in 1971, the first year in which Fairfax was divided into separate house districts (rather than a six-member district). He was re-elected twice, serving from 1972 until 1977.

Durrette ran for Attorney General twice, losing the Republican nomination in 1977 to Marshall Coleman and the general election in 1981 to Gerald Baliles. He challenged Baliles in 1985 for the Governorship but was unsuccessful and subsequently retired from politics.

Virginia House of Delegates
Preceded by	Virginia Delegate for the 18th District; 1972–1978; Served alongside: Vince Callahan, Dorothy S. McDiarmid, David A. Sutherland, Carrington Williams, Raymond E. Vickery Jr.	Succeeded by Martin H. Perper
Party political offices
Preceded by Marshall Coleman	Republican nominee for Attorney General of Virginia; 1981	Succeeded by William R. O'Brien
Preceded by Marshall Coleman	Republican nominee for Governor of Virginia; 1985	Succeeded by Marshall Coleman
