= Marshall Coleman =

American politician (born 1942)

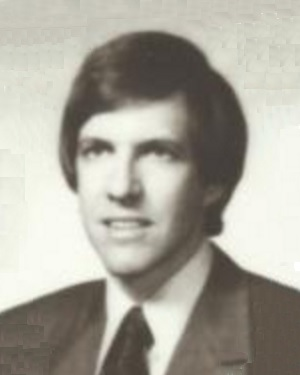

33rd Attorney General of Virginia
- In office January 14, 1978 – January 16, 1982
- Governor: John N. Dalton
- Preceded by: Anthony F. Troy
- Succeeded by: Gerald Baliles

Member of the Virginia Senate from the 24th district
- In office January 14, 1976 – December 2, 1977
- Preceded by: Frank W. Nolen
- Succeeded by: Frank W. Nolen

Member of the Virginia House of Delegates from the 15th district
- In office November 29, 1972 – January 14, 1976 Serving with Pete Giesen (1972‍–‍1974); Erwin S. Solomon (1974‍–‍1976)
- Preceded by: O. Beverley Roller
- Succeeded by: Pete Giesen

Personal details
- Born: John Marshall Coleman; June 8, 1942 (age 84) Staunton, Virginia, U.S.
- Party: Republican
- Other political affiliations: Independent (1994) (Note: Ran as in Independent in the 1994 United States Senate election in Virginia.)
- Spouses: Maureen Kelly (m. 1965, divorced); Niki Compton Fox (m. 1977, divorced)
- Children: 4
- Education: University of Virginia (BA, JD)

Military service
- Branch/service: United States Marine Corps
- Years of service: 1966–1969
- Battles/wars: Vietnam War

John Marshall Coleman (born June 8, 1942) is an American lawyer and Republican politician who served in both houses of the Virginia General Assembly during the 1970s. He was the first Republican elected as Attorney General of Virginia since Reconstruction (and of any former Confederate state since 1896) and served 1978–1982. His later campaigns for Governor of Virginia and U.S. Senate proved unsuccessful. In 1994, he mounted an unsuccessful independent campaign for the United States Senate, finishing third with 11% of the vote.

== Early and family life ==
Born in Staunton, Virginia to William Warren Coleman, a factory worker who had become a minister and his wife, Marguerite Louise Brooks. Coleman attended grammar schools during Virginia's Massive Resistance crisis. On January 15, 1952, he was shocked to find his father, who had become badly injured in an automobile accident the previous year, had committed suicide in their basement. Coleman finished his schooling nonetheless, graduating from the University of Virginia with a B.A., in 1964, and received his J.D. from the University of Virginia School of Law, in 1970. Between his studies in Charlottesville, Coleman served in the United States Marine Corps (1966–1969) during the Vietnam War, including 13 months in Vietnam.

He married Agnes Maureen Kelly of Staunton, and they had two sons. They separated during his Senate campaign in 1975. After their divorce became final, Coleman married Nicols Compton Fox in 1977. They separated in 1985 and later also divorced.

== Career ==
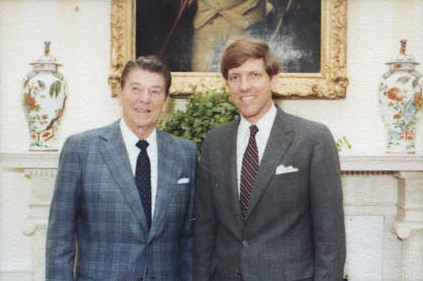
Coleman with President Ronald Reagan in 1981

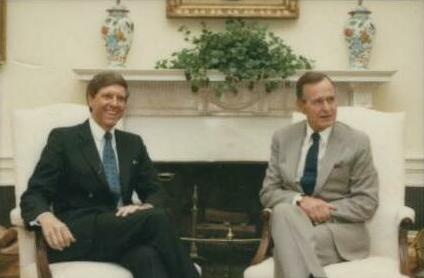
Coleman with President George H. W. Bush in 1989

Upon admission to the Virginia bar, Coleman practiced law, as well as nearly immediately ran for public office. One of the two Republicans elected in 1972 to represent District 15 (part-time) in the Virginia House of Delegates, O. Beverley Roller, resigned before the 1973 session. Coleman won the election to finish the term, so his legislative service began on November 29, 1972. He won re-election once before running (and winning) a seat in the Virginia Senate formerly held by fellow Republican H. Dunlop Dawbarn (before his resignation before the 1975 session and briefly held by Democrat Frank W. Nolen after the special election). The 15th District of the House of Delegates at the time included Augusta, Highland, and Bath Counties, as well as the cities of Staunton and Waynesboro. The 24th senatorial district between 1972 and 1980 included Augusta, Highland and Rockbridge counties, and the cities of Staunton, Waynesboro, Buena Vista and Lexington. Coleman resigned his Virginia Senate seat to run for Attorney General, and Democrat Nolen of Harrisonburg regained it in the resulting special election.

Virginia voters elected Coleman Attorney General of Virginia in 1977. He defeated Democrat Edward E. Lane, who Coleman pointed out during the campaign, had supported Massive Resistance. Coleman became the first Republican to hold the office since Reconstruction. While Attorney General, Coleman unsuccessfully argued four cases before the United States Supreme Court. Jackson v. Virginia, 443 U.S. 307 (1979) was a unanimous decision concerning review of habeas corpus petitions; Supreme Court of Virginia v. Consumer's Union, 444 U.S. 914 (1979) overturned certain regulations of attorney advertising (and allowed the winner attorney's fees), Richmond Newspapers, Inc. v. Virginia, 448 U.S. 555 (1979) upheld the right to open criminal trials under the First Amendment; Hodel v. Virginia Surface Mining and Reclamation Association, 452 U.S. 264 (1981), upheld federal regulation over surface mining.

As his term as Attorney General ended, Coleman won the GOP nomination for Governor of Virginia in 1981. However, Coleman lost to Democrat Charles S. "Chuck" Robb in the general election.

After his term as Virginia Attorney General ended (and Democrat Gerald L. Baliles succeeded to that statewide office), Coleman moved to northern Virginia to continue his private legal practice. He became a senior partner at a Washington DC law firm and Dwight C. Schar, a builder of luxury homes, became one of his clients. Schar persuaded Coleman to change firms, and he was a partner at the Tysons, Virginia office of Arent, Fox, Kintner, Plotkin & Kahn from 1985 until 1992. During this period, Coleman helped handle the merger of Schar's NV Homes with industry giant Ryan Homes, which created NVR, Inc., which was large enough to be in the Fortune 500.

While with Arent Fox and NV Homes, Coleman again ran for Virginia statewide office twice. In 1985, he sought the Republican nomination for Lieutenant Governor. However, he came in second in a five-way primary, losing to state Senator John Chichester, who later was defeated in the general election by Democrat L. Douglas Wilder.

In 1989, Coleman became the Republican nominee for governor, having upset the heavily favored former U.S. Senator Paul S. Trible, Jr., in the GOP primary. Coleman then lost a close election to Democrat L. Douglas Wilder, who became the first African-American ever elected governor of a U.S. state. Coleman had been leading in certain polls until two days before the election.

In 1994, Coleman ran for U.S. Senate as an independent, seeking to seize the middle ground between Democrat Chuck Robb (who had won election to the Senate in 1988), and the controversial GOP nominee, Oliver North. Coleman received the endorsement and support of Virginia's other U.S. Senator, Republican John Warner. However, he came in a distant third as Robb narrowly edged out North to win re-election. Coleman received only 11% of the votes cast, despite Warner's support and widespread dislike among voters for North (who had been convicted on three felony counts, later overturned, for his role in the Iran-Contra Affair) and Robb (who faced allegations of womanizing). Former First Lady Nancy Reagan openly opposed North in the election.

Coleman returned to private practice with Katten Muchin & Zavis, and managed the firm's Washington DC office from 1994 until 1996, when (already a major stockholder), he became chairman of the Board of Directors of The Fortress Group, Inc., where he remained as of 1999.

== Notes ==
Virginia House of Delegates
Preceded by O. Beverley Roller	Member from 15th district 1972–1976; Served alongside: Pete Giesen (1972–1974), Erwin S. Solomon (1974–1976)	Succeeded by Pete Giesen
Senate of Virginia
Preceded by Frank W. Nolen	Member from 24th district 1976–1977	Succeeded by Frank W. Nolen
Party political offices
Preceded by John N. Dalton	Republican nominee for Governor of Virginia; 1981	Succeeded by Wyatt Durrette
Preceded by Wyatt Durrette	Republican nominee for Governor of Virginia; 1989	Succeeded by George Allen
Legal offices
Preceded by Anthony F. Troy	Attorney General of Virginia; 1978–1982	Succeeded by Gerald L. Baliles
