= 1985 Virginia lieutenant gubernatorial election =

- November 5, 1985
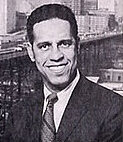

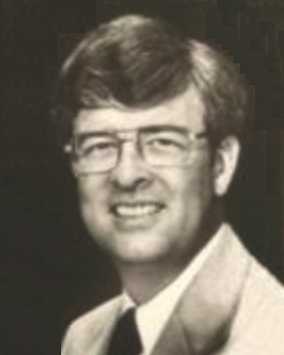
Nominee	Douglas Wilder	John Chichester
Party	Democratic	Republican
Popular vote	685,329	636,695
Percentage	51.84%	48.16%
- Wilder: 50–60% 60–70% 70–80% Chichester: 50–60% 60–70% 70–80%
Lieutenant Governor before election
Dick Davis
Democratic
Elected Lieutenant Governor
Douglas Wilder
Democratic

The 1985 Virginia lieutenant gubernatorial election was held on November 5, 1985. Democratic nominee Douglas Wilder defeated Republican nominee John Chichester with 51.84% of the vote.

== General election ==
=== Candidates ===
- Douglas Wilder, Democratic, State Senator
- John Chichester, Republican, State Senator

=== Debate ===
1985 Virginia lieutenant gubernatorial election debate
No.	Date	Host	Moderator	Link	Democratic	Republican
Key: P Participant A Absent N Not invited I Invited W Withdrawn						
Key: P Participant A Absent N Not invited I Invited W Withdrawn					Douglas Wilder	John Chichester
1	Oct. 4, 1985			C-SPAN	P	P

=== Results ===
1985 Virginia lieutenant gubernatorial election
Party	Candidate	Votes	%	±%
Democratic	Douglas Wilder	685,329	51.84%	
Republican	John Chichester	636,695	48.16%	
Majority		48,634	3.68%	
Turnout				
Democratic hold		Swing		
