= 1989 Virginia gubernatorial election =

- November 7, 1989
- Turnout: 66.5% (voting eligible)
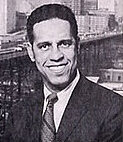

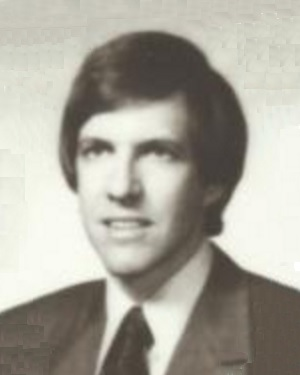
Nominee	Douglas Wilder	Marshall Coleman
Party	Democratic	Republican
Popular vote	896,936	890,195
Percentage	50.13%	49.76%
- Wilder: 50–60% 60–70% 70–80% Coleman: 50–60% 60–70% 70–80%
Governor before election
Jerry Baliles
Democratic
Elected Governor
Douglas Wilder
Democratic

The 1989 Virginia gubernatorial election was held on November 7, 1989. Incumbent Democratic governor Jerry Baliles was unable to seek a second term due to term limits. Democratic nominee and Lieutenant Governor L. Douglas Wilder went against former attorney general of Virginia J. Marshall Coleman in one of the closest elections in Virginia history. Upon taking the oath of office in January 1990, Governor Wilder became the first African-American governor of Virginia, the first African-American governor of any state since Reconstruction more than one hundred years earlier, and the first African-American elected as the governor of a U.S. state in a fully open election, as opposed to the unusual circumstances under which the Reconstruction governors were chosen.

This remains the last election in which a party won the governorship for a third consecutive term.

Coleman's perception as being far-right on the issue of abortion was a major deciding factor in swinging independents to Wilder in the election, which otherwise found little ideological separation between two candidates from the respective centrist wings of their parties.

== Republican primary ==
=== Candidates ===
- J. Marshall Coleman, former attorney general of Virginia and 1981 nominee for governor
- Stanford Parris, U.S. representative from Fairfax Station
- Paul S. Trible, Jr., former U.S. senator

Republican primary results
Party	Candidate	Votes	%
Republican	J. Marshall Coleman	147,941	36.81
Republican	Paul S. Trible, Jr.	141,120	35.11
Republican	Stanford Parris	112,826	28.07
Total votes		401,887	100.00

== General election ==
=== Candidates ===
- J. Marshall Coleman, former attorney general of Virginia and 1981 nominee for governor (Republican)
- L. Douglas Wilder, Lieutenant Governor of Virginia and former state senator from Richmond (Democratic)

=== Results ===
Virginia gubernatorial election, 1989
Party	Candidate	Votes	%	±%
Democratic	L. Douglas Wilder	896,936	50.13%	−5.04%
Republican	J. Marshall Coleman	890,195	49.76%	+4.97%
Write-ins		1,947	0.11%	
Majority		6,741	0.37%	−10.02%
Turnout		1,789,078		
Democratic hold		Swing		

==== Results by county and city ====
County	Wilder	Votes	Coleman	Votes	Others	Votes
Accomack	44.9%	4,767	55.0%	5,838	0.0%	3
Albemarle	51.7%	10,743	48.1%	9,998	0.2%	35
Alexandria	68.0%	22,451	31.8%	10,493	0.2%	77
Alleghany	49.7%	2,313	50.3%	2,342	0.0%	0
Amelia	43.8%	1,509	56.2%	1,937	0.1%	2
Amherst	44.6%	4,000	55.4%	4,965	0.0%	4
Appomattox	47.9%	2,321	52.1%	2,528	0.0%	0
Arlington	67.1%	35,716	32.8%	17,452	0.1%	44
Augusta	30.7%	4,502	69.2%	10,146	0.1%	16
Bath	46.1%	770	53.8%	900	0.1%	2
Bedford	42.0%	5,871	57.9%	8,094	0.1%	7
Bedford County	48.1%	961	51.8%	1,035	0.1%	2
Bland	33.9%	661	66.1%	1,287	0.0%	0
Botetourt	46.8%	3,998	53.1%	4,539	0.1%	5
Bristol	41.9%	2,109	58.0%	2,920	0.1%	4
Brunswick	56.1%	3,181	43.9%	2,493	0.0%	0
Buchanan	59.4%	5,678	40.6%	3,875	0.0%	0
Buckingham	44.4%	2,014	55.5%	2,515	0.0%	2
Buena Vista	51.2%	869	48.5%	823	0.4%	6
Campbell	38.6%	6,043	61.4%	9,611	0.0%	4
Caroline	54.9%	3,232	45.1%	2,658	0.0%	1
Carroll	32.5%	2,375	67.5%	4,926	0.0%	0
Charles City	78.7%	2,050	21.3%	554	0.0%	1
Charlotte	44.8%	2,072	55.2%	2,552	0.0%	2
Charlottesville	63.7%	6,892	36.1%	3,902	0.2%	24
Chesapeake	50.3%	21,384	49.6%	21,076	0.1%	24
Chesterfield	35.2%	23,799	64.6%	43,656	0.2%	151
Clarke	47.4%	1,394	52.6%	1,546	0.0%	0
Clifton Forge	57.4%	912	42.6%	676	0.0%	0
Colonial Heights	24.0%	1,568	75.9%	4,954	0.0%	1
Covington	57.3%	1,570	42.7%	1,169	0.0%	1
Craig	45.8%	766	53.9%	902	0.4%	6
Culpeper	38.7%	2,670	61.3%	4,230	0.0%	2
Cumberland	46.7%	1,418	53.3%	1,617	0.0%	0
Danville	40.4%	6,944	59.5%	10,223	0.0%	2
Dickenson	62.3%	3,536	37.6%	2,131	0.1%	6
Dinwiddie	47.5%	3,321	52.5%	3,676	0.0%	0
Emporia	46.7%	1,094	53.3%	1,249	0.0%	1
Essex	44.7%	1,373	55.2%	1,694	0.1%	2
Fairfax County	55.9%	127,236	43.9%	99,957	0.2%	518
Fairfax	52.8%	3,398	47.1%	3,027	0.1%	6
Falls Church	63.1%	2,617	36.9%	1,530	0.0%	2
Fauquier	45.3%	5,545	54.7%	6,700	0.0%	4
Floyd	39.6%	1,566	60.4%	2,387	0.0%	1
Fluvanna	42.9%	1,554	57.0%	2,063	0.1%	4
Franklin	46.0%	5,158	53.9%	6,037	0.1%	6
Franklin County	61.9%	1,865	38.1%	1,146	0.0%	0
Frederick	36.3%	3,746	63.7%	6,581	0.0%	3
Fredericksburg	52.0%	2,515	48.0%	2,321	0.1%	3
Galax	36.7%	625	63.3%	1,077	0.0%	0
Giles	51.0%	2,568	49.0%	2,468	0.0%	2
Gloucester	42.4%	4,258	57.4%	5,765	0.1%	13
Goochland	44.4%	2,473	55.5%	3,092	0.0%	2
Grayson	34.5%	1,761	65.5%	3,337	0.0%	0
Greene	33.3%	863	66.7%	1,726	0.0%	0
Greensville	57.6%	1,952	42.4%	1,435	0.0%	1
Halifax	46.7%	4,562	53.3%	5,205	0.0%	2
Hampton	59.8%	23,097	40.1%	15,489	0.1%	22
Hanover	30.8%	7,391	69.0%	16,552	0.1%	32
Harrisonburg	42.5%	2,647	57.3%	3,562	0.2%	12
Henrico	41.2%	32,939	58.7%	46,947	0.2%	156
Henry	41.5%	6,674	58.5%	9,414	0.0%	1
Highland	41.0%	437	58.8%	626	0.2%	2
Hopewell	40.3%	2,781	59.7%	4,119	0.0%	0
Isle of Wight	49.5%	4,353	50.5%	4,442	0.0%	4
James City	49.8%	5,827	50.0%	5,850	0.1%	15
King and Queen	53.3%	1,278	46.6%	1,119	0.1%	3
King George	46.2%	1,563	53.8%	1,819	0.0%	1
King William	44.2%	1,794	55.8%	2,265	0.0%	2
Lancaster	39.3%	1,834	60.7%	2,838	0.0%	0
Lee	54.8%	3,431	45.2%	2,830	0.0%	1
Lexington	58.5%	1,043	41.5%	740	0.1%	1
Loudoun	51.1%	11,065	48.8%	10,555	0.1%	25
Louisa	46.2%	2,931	53.8%	3,416	0.0%	3
Lunenburg	45.8%	1,896	54.2%	2,248	0.0%	0
Lynchburg	47.9%	10,060	52.1%	10,927	0.0%	4
Madison	40.5%	1,448	59.4%	2,121	0.1%	4
Manassas	47.4%	2,663	52.5%	2,947	0.1%	6
Manassas Park	45.5%	385	54.4%	460	0.1%	1
Martinsville	49.9%	2,763	50.1%	2,777	0.0%	1
Mathews	41.1%	1,534	58.8%	2,193	0.0%	1
Mecklenburg	38.0%	3,287	62.0%	5,373	0.0%	1
Middlesex	41.5%	1,520	58.4%	2,142	0.1%	3
Montgomery	51.7%	9,121	48.3%	8,513	0.0%	5
Nelson	54.4%	2,341	45.6%	1,961	0.0%	0
New Kent	42.6%	1,797	57.2%	2,416	0.2%	9
Newport News	54.3%	25,284	45.6%	21,261	0.1%	36
Norfolk	66.1%	37,844	33.8%	19,385	0.1%	62
Northampton	55.4%	2,482	44.4%	1,989	0.2%	9
Northumberland	40.0%	1,669	60.0%	2,506	0.0%	2
Norton	65.5%	808	34.3%	423	0.2%	3
Nottoway	45.7%	2,331	54.3%	2,768	0.0%	0
Orange	41.5%	2,465	58.4%	3,468	0.0%	1
Page	33.8%	1,925	66.1%	3,760	0.0%	2
Patrick	35.2%	1,761	64.8%	3,246	0.0%	0
Petersburg	70.8%	8,394	29.1%	3,454	0.0%	2
Pittsylvania	37.4%	6,349	62.6%	10,616	0.0%	3
Poquoson	34.0%	1,353	66.0%	2,626	0.1%	2
Portsmouth	61.9%	19,998	38.0%	12,281	0.0%	5
Powhatan	34.5%	1,741	65.4%	3,298	0.0%	2
Prince Edward	50.8%	2,822	49.2%	2,732	0.0%	2
Prince George	39.0%	2,693	61.0%	4,219	0.0%	1
Prince William	49.0%	20,329	50.9%	21,104	0.1%	34
Pulaski	44.1%	4,550	55.9%	5,771	0.0%	4
Radford	51.3%	2,092	48.6%	1,980	0.1%	3
Rappahannock	45.0%	971	55.0%	1,188	0.0%	1
Richmond County	36.3%	887	63.7%	1,558	0.0%	1
Richmond	68.0%	49,513	31.9%	23,239	0.1%	67
Roanoke	59.0%	16,590	40.9%	11,483	0.1%	22
Roanoke County	47.1%	14,074	52.9%	15,807	0.0%	8
Rockbridge	46.0%	2,314	54.0%	2,713	0.0%	0
Rockingham	30.7%	4,452	69.1%	10,019	0.2%	24
Russell	56.9%	4,955	43.1%	3,750	0.0%	2
South Boston	48.1%	3,854	51.8%	4,143	0.1%	8
Salem	43.3%	2,825	56.7%	3,704	0.0%	0
Scott	35.4%	3,390	64.6%	6,186	0.0%	3
Shenandoah	39.5%	3,557	60.4%	5,438	0.0%	4
Smyth	40.6%	987	59.3%	1,441	0.1%	2
Southampton	52.0%	3,074	48.0%	2,836	0.0%	0
Spotsylvania	41.9%	5,524	58.0%	7,646	0.0%	5
Stafford	40.3%	5,775	59.7%	8,565	0.0%	7
Staunton	37.8%	2,748	62.1%	4,512	0.0%	3
Suffolk	52.5%	8,743	47.4%	7,893	0.0%	3
Surry	63.1%	1,740	36.9%	1,018	0.0%	0
Sussex	59.1%	2,251	40.9%	1,561	0.0%	0
Tazewell	47.8%	5,338	52.2%	5,831	0.0%	3
Virginia Beach	48.2%	41,570	51.4%	44,332	0.3%	265
Warren	42.9%	2,681	57.1%	3,564	0.0%	1
Washington	40.4%	5,572	59.6%	8,219	0.0%	0
Waynesboro	36.6%	2,102	63.3%	3,637	0.1%	5
Westmoreland	48.6%	2,197	51.3%	2,322	0.1%	3
Williamsburg	61.5%	1,641	38.5%	1,026	0.0%	0
Winchester	41.1%	2,253	58.9%	3,232	0.0%	2
Wise	59.6%	6,641	40.4%	4,495	0.0%	3
Wythe	36.2%	2,817	63.8%	4,970	0.0%	0
York	45.1%	6,001	54.8%	7,283	0.1%	13

Counties and independent cities that flipped from Democratic to Republican

- Amelia (no municipalities)
- Amherst
- Appomattox
- Alleghany
- Bath
- Bedford
- Bedford (independent city)
- Bland
- Botetourt
- Bristol (independent city)
- Buckingham
- Charlotte
- Clarke
- Craig
- Dinwiddie
- Emporia (independent city)
- Franklin (independent city)
- Frederick
- Fauquier
- Fluvanna
- Galax (independent city)
- Gloucester
- Goochland (no municipalities)
- Grayson
- Halifax
- Henry
- Highland
- Isle of Wight
- James City (no municipalities)
- King George
- King William
- Louisa
- Lunenburg
- Madison
- Manassas Park (independent city)
- Martinsville (independent city)
- Middlesex
- Nottoway
- Orange
- Page
- Prince William
- Pulaski
- Rappahannock
- Roanoke
- Rockbridge
- Salem (independent city)
- Scott
- Smyth
- Stafford
- Spotsylvania
- Stafford (no municipalities)
- Tazewell
- Warren
- Washington
- Westmoreland
- Winchester (independent city)
- Virginia Beach (independent city)
- Waynesboro (independent city)
- Wythe
