= 1990 United States elections =

- ← 1988 1989 1990 1991 1992 → Midterm elections
- Election day: November 6
- Incumbent president: ▌George H. W. Bush (R)
- Next Congress: 102nd

Senate elections
- Overall control: Democratic hold
- Seats contested: 35 of 100 seats (33 seats of Class 2 + 2 special elections)
- Net seat change: Democratic +1
- 1990 Senate election results Democratic gain Democratic hold Republican hold

House elections
- Overall control: Democratic hold
- Seats contested: All 435 voting seats
- Popular vote margin: Democratic +7.8%
- Net seat change: Democratic +7
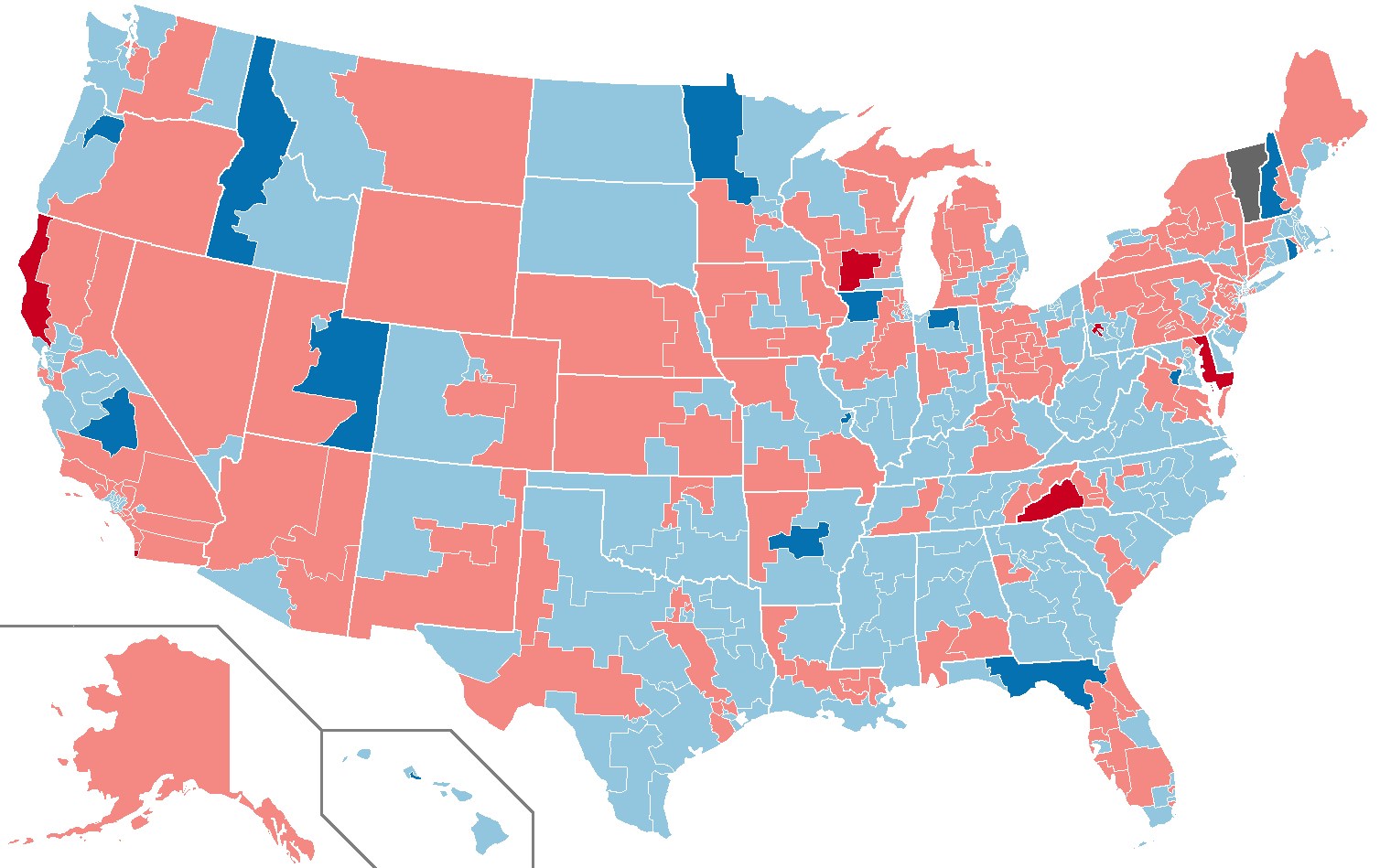
- 1990 House of Representatives election results Democratic gain Democratic hold Republican gain Republican hold Independent gain

Gubernatorial elections
- Seats contested: 38 (36 states, 2 territories)
- Net seat change: Alaskan Independence +1, A Connecticut Party +1
- 1990 gubernatorial election results Democratic gain Democratic hold Republican gain Republican hold Alaskan Independence gain A Connecticut Party gain

Elections were held on November 6, 1990 and elected the members of the 102nd United States Congress. The elections occurred in the middle of Republican President George H. W. Bush's term and during the Gulf War. The Democratic Party slightly built on their control of Congress.

The Democratic Party built on its majorities in both chambers of Congress. They picked up a net of one seat in the Senate. Democrats won the nationwide popular vote for the House of Representatives by a margin of 7.8 percentage points, picking up a net of seven seats. In the gubernatorial elections, both parties lost a net of one seat to third parties.

This is the Democratic Party's weakest midterm tide against a Republican president of the United States since 1954, but even weaker in the House when in 1954, Democrats gained 20 seats against a narrow Republican majority. President Bush's popularity at the time may have kept Democratic gains low, particularly during a war.

This remains the most recent midterm election in which both chambers were held by the Democrats during a Republican presidency, without either of them having to be flipped to their control.

== Federal elections ==
=== Senate elections ===
The 1990 Senate elections featured the smallest number of seats changing parties in US history since the passage of the Seventeenth Amendment in 1913 with only one seat changing parties. That election featured Democrat Paul Wellstone defeating incumbent Republican Rudy Boschwitz in Minnesota.

=== House of Representatives elections ===
Democrats won the nationwide popular vote for the House of Representatives by a margin of 7.8 percentage points, picking up a net of seven seats.

== State elections ==
Heading into the elections, there were 20 seats held by Democrats and 16 held by Republicans. By the end of the elections, 19 seats would be held by a Democrat, 15 would be held by a Republican, and two would be held by other parties.

Notably in these elections, there were two people elected from a third party: a former Alaskan governor and Secretary of the Interior, Joseph Hickel, was elected governor as a part of the Alaskan Independence Party, and former U.S. Senator Lowell Weicker of Connecticut won on A Connecticut Party's ticket. In addition to Weicker, two other U.S. senators were elected governors that year: Republican Pete Wilson of California and Democrat Lawton Chiles of Florida. The 1990 cycle saw six incumbent governors defeated. These were Republicans Mike Hayden of Kansas, Kay Orr of Nebraska, Bob Martinez of Florida and Edward DiPrete of Rhode Island, as well as Democrats James Blanchard of Michigan and Rudy Perpich of Minnesota.
