= 1988 United States elections =

- ← 1986 1987 1988 1989 1990 → Presidential election year
- Election day: November 8
- Incumbent president: ▌Ronald Reagan (R)
- Next Congress: 101st

Presidential election
- Partisan control: Republican hold
- Popular vote margin: Republican +7.8%
- Electoral vote
- George H. W. Bush (R): 426
- Michael Dukakis (D): 111
- 1988 presidential election results. Red denotes states won by Bush, blue denotes states won by Dukakis. Numbers indicate the electoral votes won by each candidate.

Senate elections
- Overall control: Democratic hold
- Seats contested: 33 of 100 seats
- Net seat change: Democratic +1
- 1988 Senate results Democratic gain Democratic hold Republican gain Republican hold

House elections
- Overall control: Democratic hold
- Seats contested: All 435 voting members
- Popular vote margin: Democratic +7.7%
- Net seat change: Democratic +2
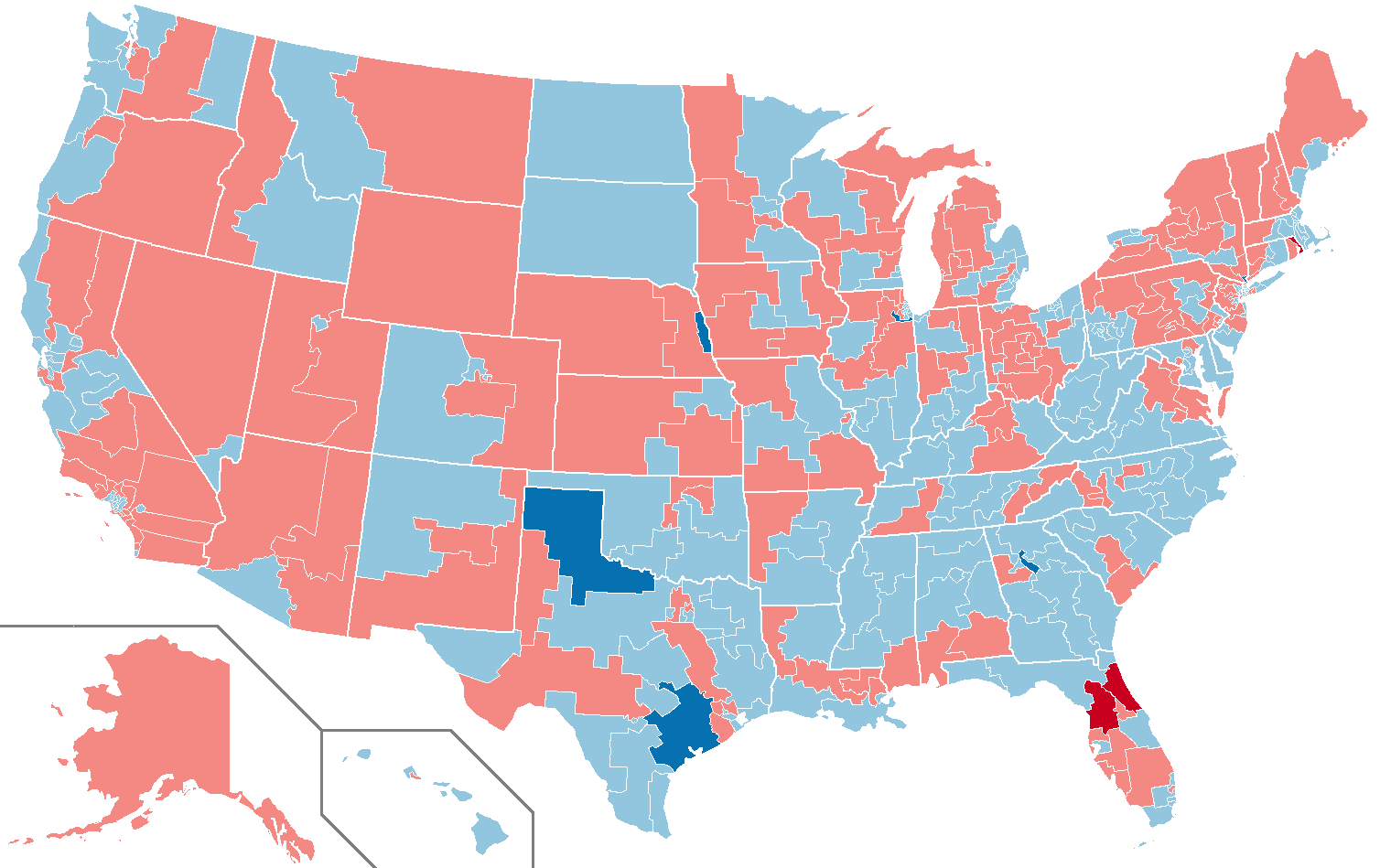
- 1988 House of Representatives results Democratic gain Democratic hold Republican gain Republican hold

Gubernatorial elections
- Seats contested: 14 (12 states, 2 territories)
- Net seat change: Democratic +1
- 1988 gubernatorial election results Territorial races not shown Democratic gain Democratic hold Republican gain Republican hold

Elections were held on November 8, 1988, and elected the president of the United States and members of the 101st United States Congress. Republican Vice President George H. W. Bush defeated Democratic Governor of Massachusetts Michael Dukakis. Despite Dukakis' defeat, the Democratic Party built on their majorities in Congress.

In the 1988 presidential election, Republican Vice President George H. W. Bush defeated Democratic governor Michael Dukakis of Massachusetts. Bush won the popular vote by just under eight points and won 426 of the 538 electoral votes. Bush won the Republican nomination over Kansas senator Bob Dole and televangelist Pat Robertson of Virginia. Dukakis won the Democratic nomination over Reverend Jesse Jackson of Illinois, Tennessee senator Al Gore, and Missouri Congressman Dick Gephardt. Bush's victory remains the only time since Harry S. Truman's victory in the 1948 presidential election in which either party won more than two consecutive presidential elections.

Neither the Senate nor the House saw any significant partisan change, and the Democratic Party retained control of both chambers. In the gubernatorial elections, the Democratic Party picked up one governorship. This was the first election since 1960 to see the winning presidential candidate's party fail to have any coattails in either house of Congress, and the first of two consecutive election cycles where this happened. This was also the second and most recent time since 1889 where a newly elected president's party failed to control either house of Congress, the first being 1968. Additionally, this is the first presidential election cycle since 1964 where Democrats gained seats in both chambers of Congress, although unlike 1964, it was the Republicans who won the concurrent presidential election.

== Federal elections ==
=== Presidential election ===
Incumbent President Ronald Reagan was ineligible to seek a third term, due to term limits established by the 22nd Amendment to the United States Constitution. With Reagan's support, Bush entered the 1988 Republican primaries as the front-runner. He defeated Senator Bob Dole and televangelist Pat Robertson to win the nomination, and selected Senator Dan Quayle of Indiana as his running mate. Dukakis won the 1988 Democratic primaries after Democratic leaders such as Gary Hart and Ted Kennedy withdrew or declined to run. He selected Senator Lloyd Bentsen of Texas – who had defeated Bush in a U.S. Senate race 18 years earlier – as his running mate.

Running an aggressive campaign, Bush concentrated on the economy and continuing Reagan's policies. He attacked Dukakis as an elitist "Massachusetts liberal", and Dukakis appeared to fail to respond effectively to Bush's criticism. Despite Dukakis's initial lead, Bush pulled ahead in opinion polling conducted in September and won by a substantial margin in both the popular and electoral vote. No candidate since 1988 has managed to equal or surpass Bush's share of the electoral or popular vote. Dukakis won 45.6% of the popular vote and carried ten states and Washington, D.C. Bush became the first sitting vice president to be elected president since Martin Van Buren in 1836.

=== Senate elections ===
Despite Bush's victory, the Democrats gained a net of one seat in the Senate. Seven seats changed parties, with four incumbents being defeated. The Democratic majority in the Senate increased by one from 54–46 to 55–45.

=== House of Representatives elections ===
Democrats won the nationwide popular vote for the House of Representatives by a margin of 7.7 percentage points, picking up a net of two seats.

== State elections ==
The Democrats had a net gain of one seat in the gubernatorial elections.
