= 1985 Virginia gubernatorial election =

- November 5, 1985
- Turnout: 53.0% (voting eligible)
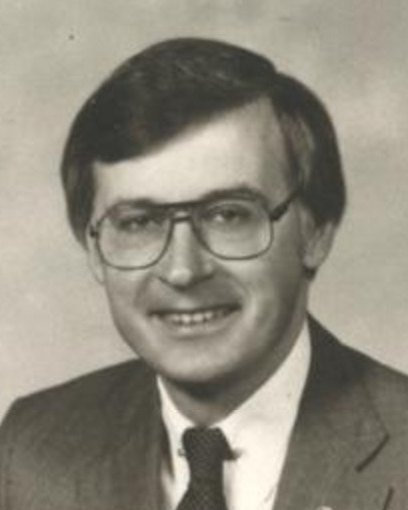

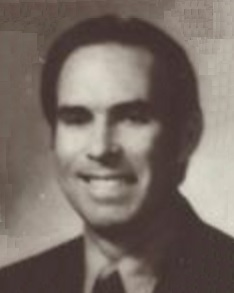
Nominee	Gerald Baliles	Wyatt Durrette
Party	Democratic	Republican
Popular vote	741,438	601,652
Percentage	55.20%	44.79%
- Baliles: 50–60% 60–70% 70–80% Durrette: 50–60% 60–70%
Governor before election
Charles Robb
Democratic
Elected Governor
Gerald Baliles
Democratic

In the 1985 Virginia gubernatorial election, incumbent Governor Chuck Robb, a Democrat, was unable to seek re-election due to term limits. Jerry Baliles, the Attorney General of Virginia, was nominated by the Democratic Party to run against Republican, Wyatt B. Durrette in a re-match of the 1981 Attorney General election.

== Background ==
During the 1970s the formerly dominant Virginia Democratic Party became severely divided into conservative, moderate and liberal factions. Consequently, the Republican Party, aided by large-scale in-migration from the Northeast to Washington D.C and Richmond suburbs, was, aided by alliances with Democratic conservatives, able to claim the governorship three consecutive times between 1969 and 1977. Indeed, the division in the state Democrats was so bad that they did not nominate a candidate for governor in 1973 — most of the party supported populist Henry Howell, who was mortally feared by the major industries and utilities. The failure of Howell in 1973 and more decisively in 1977 helped mortally weaken the radicalism he stood for, and pushed the state Democratic Party to a centrist path subsequently referred to by the moniker "New Democrats".

Chuck Robb, a son-in-law of former President Lyndon B. Johnson, would win the lieutenant governorship in 1977 with a candid but positive campaign, and regain the governorship in 1981 by placing the party solidly back in the state's mainstream, aided by bitter division inside the state GOP. By 1984, amidst a Democratic presidential election debacle, Robb had become head of the Democratic Governors Association, and had high approval ratings as he prepared to leave office – one poll had his approval rating at 80 percent.

== Democratic nomination ==
=== Candidates ===
- Jerry Baliles, Attorney General of Virginia
- Dick Davis, Lieutenant Governor of Virginia

Davis, who had apparently been endorsed by the AFL-CIO, would withdraw in June before the primary to unify the party behind Baliles.

== Republican nomination ==
1981 Attorney General nominee Wyatt Durrette was always regarded as the party's front-runner, with his chief rival being Eighth District Congressman Stanford Parris. Although a decision was planned for the last week of May, Parris withdrew at the beginning of that month.

== General election ==
=== Candidates ===
- Jerry Baliles, Attorney General of Virginia (Democratic)
- Wyatt Durrette, former State Delegate from Fairfax and 1981 Republican nominee for Attorney General of Virginia (Republican)

=== Predictions ===
Source	Ranking	As of
Danville Register and Bee	Tossup	July 19, 1985
The Star-Ledger	Likely D	October 27, 1985
The Saginaw News	Likely D	October 31, 1985
New York Times	Likely D	November 5, 1985

=== Results ===
1985 Virginia gubernatorial election
Party	Candidate	Votes	%	±%
Democratic	Gerald L. Baliles	741,438	55.20%	+1.67%
Republican	Wyatt B. Durrette Jr.	601,652	44.79%	−1.63%
Write-ins		153	0.01%	
Majority		139,786	10.41%	+3.30%
Turnout		1,343,243	32.2%	−5.1%
Democratic hold		Swing		

==== Results by county or independent city ====
1985 Virginia gubernatorial election by county or independent city
	Gerald Lee Baliles Democratic		Wyatt Beazley Durrette Jr. Republican		Various candidates Write-ins		Margin		Total votes cast
	#	%	#	%	#	%	#	%	Total votes cast
Accomack County	4,476	49.34%	4,596	50.66%			-120	-1.32%	9,072
Albemarle County	7,528	55.25%	6,096	44.74%	1	0.01%	1,432	10.51%	13,625
Alleghany County	1,791	61.72%	1,111	38.28%			680	23.43%	2,902
Amelia County	1,522	50.53%	1,490	49.47%			32	1.06%	3,012
Amherst County	4,001	53.78%	3,438	46.22%			563	7.57%	7,439
Appomattox County	2,623	58.35%	1,872	41.65%			751	16.71%	4,495
Arlington County	26,436	65.17%	14,124	34.82%	7	0.02%	12,312	30.35%	40,567
Augusta County	4,936	42.16%	6,771	57.84%			-1,835	-15.67%	11,707
Bath County	685	57.71%	502	42.29%			183	15.42%	1,187
Bedford County	5,070	51.94%	4,692	48.06%			378	3.87%	9,762
Bland County	874	51.72%	816	48.28%			58	3.43%	1,690
Botetourt County	2,528	55.20%	2,051	44.78%	1	0.02%	477	10.41%	4,580
Brunswick County	2,760	62.74%	1,639	37.26%			1,121	25.48%	4,399
Buchanan County	4,390	65.85%	2,277	34.15%			2,113	31.69%	6,667
Buckingham County	2,075	57.37%	1,542	42.63%			533	14.74%	3,617
Campbell County	4,932	45.92%	5,808	54.08%			-876	-8.16%	10,740
Caroline County	2,836	64.18%	1,583	35.82%			1,253	28.35%	4,419
Carroll County	2,687	45.06%	3,276	54.94%			-589	-9.88%	5,963
Charles City County	1,487	77.49%	432	22.51%			1,055	54.98%	1,919
Charlotte County	1,923	54.17%	1,627	45.83%			296	8.34%	3,550
Chesterfield County	18,850	38.94%	29,540	61.03%	16	0.03%	-10,690	-22.08%	48,406
Clarke County	1,166	55.16%	948	44.84%			218	10.31%	2,114
Craig County	909	55.22%	737	44.78%			172	10.45%	1,646
Culpeper County	2,455	48.38%	2,619	51.62%			-164	-3.23%	5,074
Cumberland County	1,355	49.54%	1,380	50.46%			-25	-0.91%	2,735
Dickenson County	3,325	61.81%	2,054	38.19%			1,271	23.63%	5,379
Dinwiddie County	3,310	58.24%	2,372	41.74%	1	0.02%	938	16.51%	5,683
Essex County	1,224	49.08%	1,270	50.92%			-46	-1.84%	2,494
Fairfax County	87,542	55.33%	70,656	44.66%	8	0.01%	16,886	10.67%	158,206
Fauquier County	4,175	50.03%	4,168	49.95%	2	0.02%	7	0.08%	8,345
Floyd County	1,522	49.29%	1,566	50.71%			-44	-1.42%	3,088
Fluvanna County	1,260	53.19%	1,109	46.81%			151	6.37%	2,369
Franklin County	4,826	62.05%	2,950	37.93%	1	0.01%	1,876	24.12%	7,777
Frederick County	3,475	50.14%	3,455	49.86%			20	0.29%	6,930
Giles County	2,650	57.68%	1,944	42.32%			706	15.37%	4,594
Gloucester County	3,418	50.18%	3,394	49.82%			24	0.35%	6,812
Goochland County	2,224	51.77%	2,072	48.23%			152	3.54%	4,296
Grayson County	2,448	53.58%	2,121	46.42%			327	7.16%	4,569
Greene County	700	41.15%	1,000	58.79%	1	0.06%	-300	-17.64%	1,701
Greensville County	1,997	63.04%	1,171	36.96%			826	26.07%	3,168
Halifax County	3,778	50.73%	3,670	49.27%			108	1.45%	7,448
Hanover County	6,535	37.85%	10,726	62.12%	5	0.03%	-4,191	-24.27%	17,266
Henrico County	27,424	45.20%	33,218	54.75%	32	0.05%	-5,794	-9.55%	60,674
Henry County	9,184	62.81%	5,437	37.19%			3,747	25.63%	14,621
Highland County	437	50.70%	425	49.30%			12	1.39%	862
Isle of Wight County	3,761	57.18%	2,817	42.82%			944	14.35%	6,578
James City County	3,621	53.14%	3,193	46.86%			428	6.28%	6,814
King and Queen County	1,138	60.92%	730	39.08%			408	21.84%	1,868
King George County	1,271	56.36%	984	43.64%			287	12.73%	2,255
King William County	1,532	50.63%	1,494	49.37%			38	1.26%	3,026
Lancaster County	1,708	44.17%	2,159	55.83%			-451	-11.66%	3,867
Lee County	3,984	62.43%	2,398	37.57%			1,586	24.85%	6,382
Loudoun County	7,925	53.81%	6,802	46.18%	1	0.01%	1,123	7.62%	14,728
Louisa County	2,856	57.56%	2,104	42.40%	2	0.04%	752	15.16%	4,962
Lunenburg County	1,804	56.85%	1,369	43.15%			435	13.71%	3,173
Madison County	1,538	52.62%	1,385	47.38%			153	5.23%	2,923
Mathews County	1,298	47.06%	1,460	52.94%			-162	-5.87%	2,758
Mecklenburg County	3,195	48.70%	3,365	51.30%			-170	-2.59%	6,560
Middlesex County	1,500	51.35%	1,421	48.65%			79	2.70%	2,921
Montgomery County	7,702	57.03%	5,801	42.96%	1	0.01%	1,901	14.08%	13,504
Nelson County	2,043	66.20%	1,043	33.80%			1,000	32.40%	3,086
New Kent County	1,436	49.81%	1,447	50.19%			-11	-0.38%	2,883
Northampton County	2,375	60.68%	1,539	39.32%			836	21.36%	3,914
Northumberland County	1,657	45.13%	2,015	54.87%			-358	-9.75%	3,672
Nottoway County	2,269	53.24%	1,993	46.76%			276	6.48%	4,262
Orange County	2,243	51.44%	2,117	48.56%			126	2.89%	4,360
Page County	2,330	53.35%	2,037	46.65%			293	6.71%	4,367
Patrick County	3,249	70.43%	1,364	29.57%			1,885	40.86%	4,613
Pittsylvania County	6,886	46.21%	8,014	53.79%			-1,128	-7.57%	14,900
Powhatan County	1,498	39.72%	2,273	60.28%			-775	-20.55%	3,771
Prince Edward County	2,736	56.09%	2,140	43.87%	2	0.04%	596	12.22%	4,878
Prince George County	2,400	48.31%	2,568	51.69%			-168	-3.38%	4,968
Prince William County	13,499	55.30%	10,909	44.69%	4	0.02%	2,590	10.61%	24,412
Pulaski County	5,380	59.74%	3,626	40.26%			1,754	19.48%	9,006
Rappahannock County	930	55.59%	743	44.41%			187	11.18%	1,673
Richmond County	929	46.15%	1,084	53.85%			-155	-7.70%	2,013
Roanoke County	10,710	53.44%	9,332	46.56%	1	0.00%	1,378	6.88%	20,043
Rockbridge County	1,878	52.87%	1,672	47.07%	2	0.06%	206	5.80%	3,552
Rockingham County	4,229	41.73%	5,904	58.27%			-1,675	-16.53%	10,133
Russell County	4,622	64.53%	2,541	35.47%			2,081	29.05%	7,163
Scott County	3,453	54.28%	2,909	45.72%			544	8.55%	6,362
Shenandoah County	3,138	42.16%	4,305	57.84%			-1,167	-15.68%	7,443
Smyth County	4,426	52.55%	3,996	47.45%			430	5.11%	8,422
Southampton County	2,721	51.55%	2,557	48.45%			164	3.11%	5,278
Spotsylvania County	4,146	54.61%	3,446	45.39%			700	9.22%	7,592
Stafford County	5,078	50.48%	4,980	49.50%	2	0.02%	98	0.97%	10,060
Surry County	1,405	65.44%	742	34.56%			663	30.88%	2,147
Sussex County	2,066	61.18%	1,311	38.82%			755	22.36%	3,377
Tazewell County	4,722	58.97%	3,285	41.03%			1,437	17.95%	8,007
Warren County	2,327	56.23%	1,811	43.77%			516	12.47%	4,138
Washington County	5,691	53.55%	4,936	46.45%			755	7.10%	10,627
Westmoreland County	1,972	57.06%	1,484	42.94%			488	14.12%	3,456
Wise County	6,445	65.57%	3,384	34.43%			3,061	31.14%	9,829
Wythe County	3,597	53.03%	3,186	46.97%			411	6.06%	6,783
York County	4,536	48.60%	4,795	51.38%	2	0.02%	-259	-2.78%	9,333
Alexandria City	15,506	65.12%	8,304	34.87%	3	0.01%	7,202	30.24%	23,813
Bedford City	1,171	59.50%	797	40.50%			374	19.00%	1,968
Bristol City	2,734	56.77%	2,082	43.23%			652	13.54%	4,816
Buena Vista City	1,041	59.52%	708	40.48%			333	19.04%	1,749
Charlottesville City	5,715	66.02%	2,941	33.97%	1	0.01%	2,774	32.04%	8,657
Chesapeake City	16,495	59.21%	11,364	40.79%	1	0.00%	5,131	18.42%	27,860
Clifton Forge City	815	67.13%	399	32.87%			416	34.27%	1,214
Colonial Heights City	1,950	36.19%	3,437	63.79%	1	0.02%	-1,487	-27.60%	5,388
Covington City	1,625	67.23%	792	32.77%			833	34.46%	2,417
Danville City	4,718	41.87%	6,548	58.12%	1	0.01%	-1,830	-16.24%	11,267
Emporia City	779	51.02%	748	48.98%			31	2.03%	1,527
Fairfax City	2,577	50.38%	2,538	49.62%			39	0.76%	5,115
Falls Church City	1,816	60.07%	1,206	39.89%	1	0.03%	610	20.18%	3,023
Franklin City	1,307	59.41%	893	40.59%			414	18.82%	2,200
Fredericksburg City	2,186	54.46%	1,827	45.52%	1	0.02%	359	8.94%	4,014
Galax City	1,087	56.00%	854	44.00%			233	12.00%	1,941
Hampton City	16,634	60.92%	10,671	39.08%	1	0.00%	5,963	21.84%	27,306
Harrisonburg City	2,298	47.36%	2,553	52.62%	1	0.02%	-255	-5.26%	4,852
Hopewell City	2,999	48.58%	3,173	51.40%	1	0.02%	-174	-2.82%	6,173
Lexington City	883	54.88%	726	45.12%			157	9.76%	1,609
Lynchburg City	8,389	48.85%	8,784	51.15%			-395	-2.30%	17,173
Manassas City	1,534	48.54%	1,626	51.46%			-92	-2.91%	3,160
Manassas Park City	457	54.67%	379	45.33%			78	9.33%	836
Martinsville City	3,220	60.89%	2,068	39.11%			1,152	21.79%	5,288
Newport News City	19,429	57.37%	14,433	42.61%	7	0.02%	4,996	14.75%	33,869
Norfolk City	30,857	67.79%	14,652	32.19%	8	0.02%	16,205	35.60%	45,517
Norton City	945	70.21%	401	29.79%			544	40.42%	1,346
Petersburg City	7,556	67.71%	3,604	32.29%			3,952	35.41%	11,160
Poquoson City	1,154	39.74%	1,750	60.26%			-596	-20.52%	2,904
Portsmouth City	19,098	67.82%	9,059	32.17%	3	0.01%	10,039	35.65%	28,160
Radford City	1,977	59.19%	1,363	40.81%			614	18.38%	3,340
Richmond City	42,953	67.24%	20,904	32.72%	22	0.03%	22,049	34.52%	63,879
Roanoke City	13,380	64.78%	7,272	35.21%	2	0.01%	6,108	29.57%	20,654
Salem City	3,082	55.27%	2,493	44.71%	1	0.02%	589	10.56%	5,576
South Boston City	890	44.26%	1,121	55.74%			-231	-11.49%	2,011
Staunton City	2,729	45.27%	3,299	54.73%			-570	-9.46%	6,028
Suffolk City	7,937	61.18%	5,037	38.82%			2,900	22.35%	12,974
Virginia Beach City	29,967	49.03%	31,144	50.96%	5	0.01%	-1,177	-1.93%	61,116
Waynesboro City	2,217	53.27%	1,945	46.73%			272	6.54%	4,162
Williamsburg City	1,284	58.66%	905	41.34%			379	17.31%	2,189
Winchester City	2,443	53.34%	2,137	46.66%			306	6.68%	4,580
Totals	741,438	55.20%	601,652	44.79%	153	0.01%	139,786	10.41%	1,343,243

Counties and independent cities that flipped from Democratic to Republican

- Accomack
- Cumberland
- Matthews
- Mecklenburg
- Virginia Beach (independent city)

Counties and independent cities that flipped from Republican to Democratic

- Ablemarle
- Clarke
- Frederick
- Fauquier
- Halifax
- Highland
- King George
- Loudoun
- Page
- Roanoke
- Scott
- Stafford
- Washington
- Emporia (independent city)
- Winchester (independent city)
- Waynesboro (independent city)

== Analysis ==
This was the most recent time the Democratic candidate won a gubernatorial race in Virginia with a double-digit margin of victory, until 2025, when Abigail Spanberger won by a double digit margin. It is also the last time, and only time since 1961, that a gubernatorial candidate swept every congressional district in the state, and the last time Amelia County, Bland County, Botetourt County, Clarke County, Fauquier County, Frederick County, Gloucester County, Goochland County, Grayson County, Highland County, King George County, King William County, Madison County, Middlesex County, Orange County, Page County, Patrick County, Rappahannock County, Roanoke County, Russell County, Scott County, Warren County, Washington County, Wythe County, or the independent cities of Bristol and Galax backed a Democrat for Governor. Spotsylvania County, Stafford County, and the independent city of Waynesboro would not back a Democrat for governor again until 2025.

The election attracted press attention for the poor turnout, which was overall the lowest for a gubernatorial election since 1969, and sufficiently low that winning Democrat Baliles polled fewer votes in the state than Walter Mondale had when decisively beaten in the presidential election the year prior. It was the first election since 1961 when the state's electorate was still severely restricted by the poll tax that turnout had fallen from the preceding gubernatorial election. This was widely seen as being substantially due to the Election Day floods, but as the Danville Register and Bee noted, turnout declines were worst in Northern Virginia which was not affected by flooding.
