= Douglas Wilder =

American politician (born 1931)

Doug Wilder
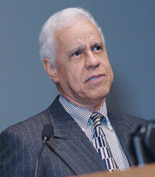
- Wilder in 2003

78th Mayor of Richmond
- In office January 2, 2005 – January 1, 2009
- Preceded by: Rudy McCollum
- Succeeded by: Dwight Jones

66th Governor of Virginia
- In office January 13, 1990 – January 15, 1994
- Lieutenant: Don Beyer
- Preceded by: Gerald Baliles
- Succeeded by: George Allen

35th Lieutenant Governor of Virginia
- In office January 18, 1986 – January 13, 1990
- Governor: Gerald Baliles
- Preceded by: Richard Davis
- Succeeded by: Don Beyer

Member of the Virginia Senate from the 9th district
- In office January 12, 1972 – January 1, 1986
- Preceded by: M. Patton Echols
- Succeeded by: Benjamin Lambert

Member of the Virginia Senate from the 30th district
- In office January 14, 1970 – January 12, 1972
- Preceded by: J. Sargeant Reynolds
- Succeeded by: Leroy S. Bendheim

Personal details
- Born: Lawrence Douglas Wilder; January 17, 1931 (age 95) Richmond, Virginia, U.S.
- Party: Democratic
- Other political affiliations: Independent (1994)
- Spouse: Eunice Montgomery (m. 1958; div. 1978)
- Children: 3, including Larry
- Education: Virginia Union University (BS); Howard University (JD)

Military service
- Branch/service: United States Army
- Years of service: 1951–1953
- Rank: Sergeant
- Battles/wars: Korean War
- Awards: Bronze Star Medal

Lawrence Douglas Wilder (born January 17, 1931) is an American lawyer and politician who served as the 66th governor of Virginia from 1990 to 1994. He was the first African American to serve as governor of a U.S. state since the Reconstruction era, and the first African American ever elected as governor. (Note: The first African-American governor of a U.S. state was P. B. S. Pinchback, who was not elected to the office of governor. Pinchback became Governor of Louisiana upon the removal of his predecessor from office, and served as governor from December 1872 to January 1873. Melvin H. Evans was elected governor of a U.S. territory in 1970.) He is currently a professor at the namesake Wilder School at Virginia Commonwealth University.

Born in Richmond, Virginia, Wilder graduated from Virginia Union University and served in the United States Army during the Korean War. He established a legal practice in Richmond after graduating from the Howard University School of Law. A member of the Democratic Party, Wilder won election to the Virginia Senate in 1969. He remained in that chamber until 1986, when he took office as the Lieutenant Governor of Virginia, becoming the first African American to hold statewide office in Virginia. In the 1989 Virginia gubernatorial election, Wilder narrowly defeated Republican Marshall Coleman.

Wilder left the gubernatorial office in 1994, as the Virginia constitution prohibits governors from immediately seeking re-election. He briefly sought the 1992 Democratic presidential nomination, but withdrew from the race before the first primaries. He also briefly ran as an independent in the 1994 Virginia Senate election before dropping out of the race. Wilder returned to elective office in 2005, when he became the first directly elected mayor of Richmond. After leaving office in 2009, he worked as an adjunct professor and was involved in planning the unrealized United States National Slavery Museum.

== Early life ==
Wilder was born on January 17, 1931, in the segregated Church Hill neighborhood of Richmond, Virginia. He is the son of Beulah Olive (Richards) and Robert Judson Wilder. He is the grandson of slaves, his paternal grandparents having been enslaved in Goochland County. The seventh of eight brothers and sisters, Wilder was named for the African American writers Paul Laurence Dunbar and Frederick Douglass.

Wilder's father sold insurance and his mother worked as a maid. While the family was never completely destitute, Wilder recalled his early years during the Great Depression as a childhood of "gentle poverty". In 1947 Wilder graduated from Armstrong High School where one of his fellow students was dancer and choreographer Nat Horne.

Wilder worked his way through Virginia Union University, a historically black university, by waiting tables at hotels and shining shoes, graduating in 1951 with a degree in chemistry.

Drafted into the United States Army during the Korean War, he volunteered for combat duty. At the Battle of Pork Chop Hill, he and two other men found themselves cut off from their unit, but they bluffed nineteen North Korean soldiers into surrendering, for which Wilder was awarded the Bronze Star Medal. He was a sergeant when he was discharged in 1953.

Following the war, Wilder worked in the state medical examiner's office and pursued a master's degree in chemistry. In 1956 he changed his career plans and entered Howard University Law School. After graduating in 1959, he established a law practice in Richmond, the Virginia capital.

Wilder married Eunice Montgomery in 1958. The couple had three children before divorcing in 1978: Lynn Diana; Lawrence Douglas Jr.; and Loren Deane.

== Early political life ==
Wilder had joined the Democratic Party and began his career in public office by winning a 1969 special election for the Virginia State Senate from a Richmond-area district. He was the first African American elected to the Virginia Senate since Reconstruction. A 1970 redistricting gave Wilder a predominantly African-American district, and he became a liberal in a predominantly conservative, white-majority legislature.

Wilder briefly flirted with an independent bid for the United States Senate in 1982. He did so after the initial favorite for the Democratic nomination, State Delegate Owen Pickett of Virginia Beach, paid homage to the Byrd Organization in announcing his bid. Angered that Pickett would praise a political machine who obstinately resisted racial integration, Wilder threatened to make an independent bid for the seat if Pickett won the nomination. Pickett not only realized that Wilder was serious, but that he would siphon off enough black votes in a three-way race to hand the seat to the Republican nominee, Congressman Paul Trible. Pickett pulled out of the race, and Wilder abandoned plans to run for the Senate.

In 1985 Wilder was narrowly elected as the 35th Lieutenant Governor of Virginia on a Democratic ticket headed by Attorney General Gerald L. Baliles, the party's candidate for governor. Wilder was the first African American to win a statewide election in Virginia. Aware that he needed to reach the swath of the state's majority-white electorate, Wilder had undertaken a two-month "back roads" campaign tour of the state, visiting Virginia's predominantly rural central and western regions and enhancing his name recognition across the state.

== Campaign for governor of Virginia ==
In the 1989 campaign for governor of Virginia, Wilder had a comfortable lead in the last polls before the election. The unexpected closeness of the election may have been due to the Republicans' strong get out the vote efforts. Wilder had been candid about his pro-choice position in relation to abortion. Some observers believed the close election was caused by the Bradley effect, and suggested that white voters were reluctant to tell pollsters that they did not intend to vote for Wilder. (Note: Such an observation is common enough that the Bradley effect is sometimes called the "Wilder effect".) Wilder was elected governor on November 8, 1989, defeating Republican Marshall Coleman by a spread of less than half a percent. The narrow victory margin prompted a recount, which reaffirmed Wilder's election.

== Governor of Virginia ==
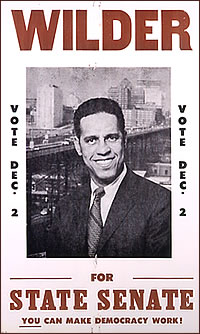
Wilder state senate campaign poster, 1969

Wilder was sworn in on January 13, 1990, by former U.S. Supreme Court Justice Lewis F. Powell Jr. In recognition of his landmark achievement as the first elected African-American governor, the National Association for the Advancement of Colored People awarded Wilder the Spingarn Medal for 1990.

During his tenure as governor, Wilder worked on crime and gun control initiatives. He also worked to fund Virginia's transportation initiatives, effectively lobbying Congress to reallocate highway money to the states with the greatest needs. Much residential and office development had taken place in Northern Virginia without its receiving sufficient federal money for infrastructure improvements to keep up. He also succeeded in passing state bond issues to support improving transportation. In May 1990 Wilder ordered state agencies and universities to divest themselves of any investments in South Africa because of its policy of apartheid.

Wilder made a failed attempt to enter into an agreement with the Washington Redskins to build a stadium at Potomac Yard in Alexandria. Wilder and Washington Redskins owner Jack Kent Cooke had made an agreement for the move which entailed a $130 million subsidy by the state of the Virginia. However, legislators revised the agreement to reduce the cost to taxpayers by $40 million (relative to the original plan by Cooke and Wilder), which led Cooke to pull out of the agreement.

=== Capital punishment ===
During his term, Wilder carried out Virginia's law on capital punishment, although he had opposed the death penalty when he served in the Virginia Senate. A total of 14 executions were carried out in the state's electric chair, including the controversial case of Roger Keith Coleman. In January 1994 Wilder commuted the sentence of Earl Washington Jr., an intellectually disabled man, to life in prison based on testing of DNA evidence that raised questions about his guilt. Virginia law has strict time limits on when such new evidence can be introduced post-conviction. But in 2000, under a new governor, an STR-based DNA test led to the exclusion of Washington as the perpetrator of the murder for which he had been sentenced. He was fully exonerated by Governor Jim Gilmore for the capital murder and he was released from prison. As Virginia limits consecutive gubernatorial terms, Wilder was succeeded in 1994 by George Allen.

== Campaigns for president and senate ==
Following the November 1990 midterms, Wilder's political ally Paul Goldman filed with the Federal Election Commission (FEC) to create the Committee for Fiscal Responsibility in 1992. The committee's creation by Wilder aides was widely viewed as a precursor to a presidential bid by Wilder.

Wilder declared himself a candidate for president in 1991, but withdrew before the 1992 primary season had ended. He was reportedly "lukewarm" on Bill Clinton, and refused to endorse the Clinton-Gore 1992 campaign in until the July 1992 Democratic National Convention. At the time, he was rumored to break with the party and join Ross Perot's 1992 presidential campaign as a vice-presidential candidate.

He briefly ran for the U.S. Senate as an independent in 1994. Relations between Wilder and then Senator Chuck Robb became strained following Wilder's aborted 1982 senate bid, with surreptitious recordings taken by Robb's staff contributing to a long running feud between the two men.

== Mayor of Richmond ==
On May 30, 2004, Wilder announced his intention to run for Mayor of Richmond. Until 2004, the Richmond City Council had chosen the mayor from among its 9 members. The move to change this policy succeeded in November 2003 when voters approved a mayor-at-large referendum, with roughly 80 percent voting in favor of the measure. Wilder was a leading proponent of the mayor-at-large proposal.

On November 2, 2004, Wilder received 79% of the vote (55,319 votes) to become the first directly elected mayor of the city in sixty years. Upon winning the election, Wilder communicated his intentions to take on corruption in the city government, issuing several ultimatums to the sitting city council before he took office. He was sworn in on January 2, 2005.

He was a member of the Mayors Against Illegal Guns Coalition, a bipartisan group with a stated goal of "making the public safer by getting illegal guns off the streets." The Coalition was co-chaired by former Boston Mayor Thomas Menino and former New York City Mayor Michael Bloomberg.

On May 16, 2008, Wilder announced that he would not seek reelection to another four-year term as mayor.

Wilder made news in 2012 when he refused to support Barack Obama, the nation's first black president, for another term. He noted that he supported Obama in 2008, but said the president's tenure in the Oval Office thus far had been a disappointment. Wilder did not endorse Mitt Romney, the Republican challenger. Despite attending a fundraiser for Romney's campaign, he later said that he hoped for an Obama victory.

== Post-political career ==
Wilder has served as a distinguished professor in the L. Douglas Wilder School of Government and Public Affairs at Virginia Commonwealth University. He writes occasional editorials for Virginia newspapers.

He is the founder of the United States National Slavery Museum, a non-profit organization based in Fredericksburg, Virginia. The museum has been fundraising and campaigning since 2001 to establish a national museum of slavery in America. In June 2008 Wilder requested that the museum be granted tax-exempt status, which was denied. From that time, taxes on the land had not been paid and the property was at risk of being sold at auction by the city of Fredericksburg.

Beset by financial problems, the museum has been assessed delinquent property taxes for the years 2009, 2010, and 2011, amounting to just over $215,000. The organization filed for Chapter 11 bankruptcy protection on September 22, 2011. In early 2011, Wilder refused to respond to or answer any questions from either news reporters or patrons who had donated artifacts.

In 2015, Wilder published an autobiography, Son of Virginia: A Life in America's Political Arena.

In March 2018, Wilder filed suit against John Accordino, who was serving as the Dean of his namesake college, for harassing Wilder's assistant. This led to Accordino stepping down from his position and Susan Gooden being named as the interim dean of the college and then Wilder dropping the suit four months after filing.

In March 2019, Sydney Black filed a complaint under Title IX of the Education Amendments Act of 1972 against Wilder for sexual harassment after she claims he made sexual advances to her, which she rebuffed, and then told her later that there was no funding for her position at the Virginia Commonwealth University. In July 2019, the university's independent investigator concluded that Wilder did kiss the student without her consent. In response, Wilder provided a detailed rebuttal, in which he denied "non-consensual sexual contact” between Black and him. In addition, he denied retaliating against her by saying her position had been eliminated. Wilder also claimed the investigator ignored contradictory evidence, including his claim that Black called him eight times after the night during which he supposedly kissed her, something she presumably would not have done if she felt harassed or threatened. The university planned to consider the investigator's findings and Wilder's rebuttal before deciding what action to take, if any. On October 24, 2019, Wilder announced that the university's internal review panel had cleared him of wrongdoing.

In 2020, Wilder raised concerns that the state archives at the Library of Virginia had failed to provide access to the records of his gubernatorial administration.

In 2021, following the gubernatorial election of Republican Glenn Youngkin, Wilder joined Governor Youngkin's transition team, alongside former Republican governors Jim Gilmore, Bob McDonnell, and George Allen.

In March 2025, Wilder was alleged to have contributed to the firing of a faculty member at VCU. In the summer, Wilder sued a pair of VCU leaders over a workplace investigation involving him over claims that he created a toxic workplace environment, claiming that it was retaliatory for his past criticisms of the school leadership. A heavily redacted report, prepared by an outside law firm and received by The Richmonder, said that the complaints that led to the investigation had only been made by one person, and that no one else had described the workplace as toxic or threatening.

On January 17, 2026, his 95th birthday, Wilder attended the inauguration of Virginia's first female governor Abigail Spanberger, first Muslim lieutenant governor, Ghazala Hashmi, and first black attorney general, Jay Jones.

== Honors and awards ==
- In 2004, Virginia Commonwealth University named its School of Government and Public Affairs in honor of Wilder. He serves as an adjunct faculty member at the school.
- The Virginia Union University library, Norfolk State University's performing arts center, and a Hampton University dormitory are also named after Wilder.
- Wilder received an honorary doctorate from Arizona State University in 2004.
- Virginia State University named its Cooperative Extension Building the L. Douglas Wilder Building.
- In 1996, L. Douglas Wilder Middle School was named in his honor.
- 1990 Harold Washington Award from the Congressional Black Caucus Foundation
- 1987: Adam Clayton Powell Award from the Congressional Black Caucus Foundation

== Personal papers ==
The L. Douglas Wilder Collection resides at the L. Douglas Wilder Library and Learning Resource Center at his alma mater, Virginia Union University. The collection contains press office photographs from Wilder's time as governor, over 600 audio cassette tapes of Wilder's WRVA radio talk show as well as other speeches, and over 350 video cassettes of political events, campaign materials, and news appearances. A gallery located in the library displays many of his political recognitions and awards.

== See also ==
- List of minority governors and lieutenant governors in the United States

== Notes ==
Political offices
Preceded by Richard Davis	Lieutenant Governor of Virginia; 1986–1990	Succeeded by Don Beyer
Preceded by Gerald Baliles	Governor of Virginia; 1990–1994	Succeeded by George Allen
Preceded by Rudy McCollum	Mayor of Richmond; 2005–2009	Succeeded by Dwight Jones
Party political offices
Preceded by Gerald Baliles	Democratic nominee for Governor of Virginia; 1989	Succeeded by Mary Sue Terry
U.S. order of precedence (ceremonial)
Preceded by Martha McSally as Former U.S. Senator	Order of precedence of the United States; Within Virginia	Succeeded by Jim Gilmore as Former Governor
Preceded by Chris Sununu as Former Governor	Order of precedence of the United States; Outside Virginia	Succeeded by Jim Gilmore as Former Governor
