= Gerald Baliles =

American politician and lawyer (1940–2019)

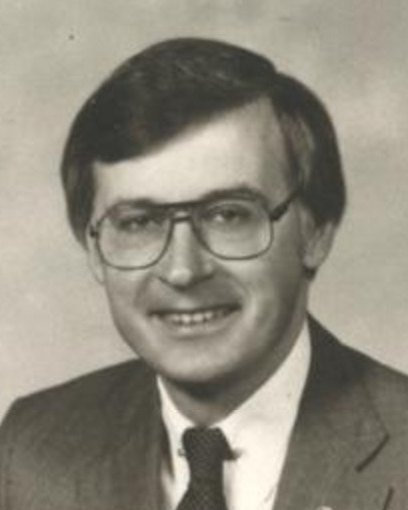

Chair of the National Governors Association
- In office August 9, 1988 – August 1, 1989
- Preceded by: John H. Sununu
- Succeeded by: Terry Branstad

65th Governor of Virginia
- In office January 18, 1986 – January 13, 1990
- Lieutenant: Douglas Wilder
- Preceded by: Chuck Robb
- Succeeded by: Douglas Wilder

34th Attorney General of Virginia
- In office January 16, 1982 – June 30, 1985
- Governor: Chuck Robb
- Preceded by: Marshall Coleman
- Succeeded by: William Broaddus

Member of the Virginia House of Delegates from the 35th district
- In office January 14, 1976 – January 13, 1982
- Preceded by: Howard Carwile
- Succeeded by: C. Hardaway Marks

Personal details
- Born: Gerald Lee Baliles; July 8, 1940 Stuart, Virginia, U.S.
- Died: October 29, 2019 (aged 79) Charlottesville, Virginia, U.S.
- Party: Democratic
- Spouses: Jeannie Patterson (m. 1965; div. 1996) Robin Deal (m. 2003)
- Children: 4
- Education: Wesleyan University (BA); University of Virginia (LLB)

Gerald Lee Baliles (/bəˈlaɪlz/ bə-LYLES; July 8, 1940 – October 29, 2019) was an American lawyer and Democratic politician from the Commonwealth of Virginia whose career spanned great social and technological changes in his native state. The 65th Governor of Virginia (from 1986 to 1990), the native of Patrick County previously served as the Commonwealth's attorney general (1982–85), and represented Richmond and Henrico County in the Virginia House of Delegates (1972–1982). After another stint in private legal practice, with Hunton & Williams (1991–2005), Baliles directed the nonpartisan Miller Center of Public Affairs associated with his alma mater, the University of Virginia (2006–2014).

== Early life and education ==
Born on July 8, 1940, in rural Patrick County, near Stuart, when their parents divorced, Baliles and his brother Larry were raised by their grandparents; an aunt and uncle raised their brother Stuart. During Virginia's Massive Resistance (which included school closings in many counties), Baliles attended Fishburne Military School in Waynesboro, Virginia. He then earned a bachelor's degree in government from Wesleyan University in Connecticut (1963). In 1967, Baliles received a J.D. from the University of Virginia School of Law in Charlottesville, Virginia.

== Career ==
Following his admission to the Virginia bar, Baliles accepted an entry-level position as an assistant attorney general in the state capital, Richmond, where he gained expertise in environmental law. He received a promotion to Deputy Attorney General of Virginia during his final three years on that office's staff (1972–1975). As the Byrd Organization crumbled, Baliles left the office and set up a private legal practice. He had become the secretary of Richmond's Democratic committee in 1971, and ran for office on his own behalf in 1975, and become one of the delegates representing Richmond and Henrico County, Virginia, in the Virginia General Assembly (a part-time position), Re-elected as a member of the Virginia House of Delegates thru 1981 (when he successfully ran for Attorney General, as discussed below). In the legislature, Baliles served on the Corporations, Insurance and Banking, and Agriculture committees. He was also active in the American Bar Association, the Virginia Bar Association, and the Richmond Bar Association, and chaired the Virginia Model Judiciary Program from 1975 to 1977. He was also admitted to practice before the United States Court of Appeals for the Fourth Circuit and the Supreme Court of the United States.

=== Attorney General of Virginia ===
Baliles ran for statewide office as attorney general in 1981 on a ticket led by Chuck Robb, who became Virginia's 64th Governor. His peers elected him Outstanding Attorney General. He resigned his office in order to campaign for governor, so his chief deputy, William Gray Broaddus briefly became Virginia's Attorney General until voters elected Mary Sue Terry (who ran on the same winning ticket as Baliles), to that office.

=== Governor of Virginia ===
Since Virginia's state constitution limits governors to non-consecutive single terms in office, Baliles ran to succeed Robb and won both the Democratic primary and general election. In the 1985 election Baliles led a diverse Democratic slate, with Douglas Wilder as Lieutenant Governor (the first African-American to hold that office) and Mary Sue Terry as attorney general (the first woman to hold that office). They defeated the white male Republican slate led by delegate Wyatt Durrette. Baliles won 55.2% of the gubernatorial vote.

He served as the 65th Governor of Virginia from 1986 to 1990, and became known as an advocate for transportation, education, and economic development. He also appointed the first woman, Elizabeth B. Lacy, to the Virginia Supreme Court, expanded the state prison system, and sought to strengthen the state's environmental protections, including cleaning the Chesapeake Bay.

During his term in office, Baliles sought to reform Virginia's transportation infrastructure. In 1986, he guided a $422 million-a-year revenue package through a special session of the General Assembly to improve Virginia's transportation system, even daring to raise gasoline taxes and advocate toll roads. Some later called him Virginia's "transportation governor" because of the premium he placed on improving transportation. Another of Baliles's key priorities as governor was ensuring the state's ability to participate and compete in world markets, and during his administration Virginia's international trade grew substantially. Increasing its revenues became another signature accomplishment.

Baliles long emphasized the need for workers to continually acquire new skills and training throughout their lives and careers. His administration increased faculty salaries, making pay for the state's higher-education teachers the highest in the South and within $400 of the national average. He began convening annual meetings of educators and education officials with the goal of building a flexible, statewide educational system that would be accessible to Virginians of all backgrounds and ages, including from the state's rural regions outside the Washington/Richmond corridor. In 1989, he hosted the nation's governors in Charlottesville for President George H. W. Bush's summit. During Baliles's administration, the state gained 300,000 jobs, and boasted the highest per-capita income in the South (the ninth highest in the nation). Despite a national recession in the final year of his term, Baliles's popularity helped secure the narrow election of Douglas Wilder as governor in 1989.

=== Post-gubernatorial career ===
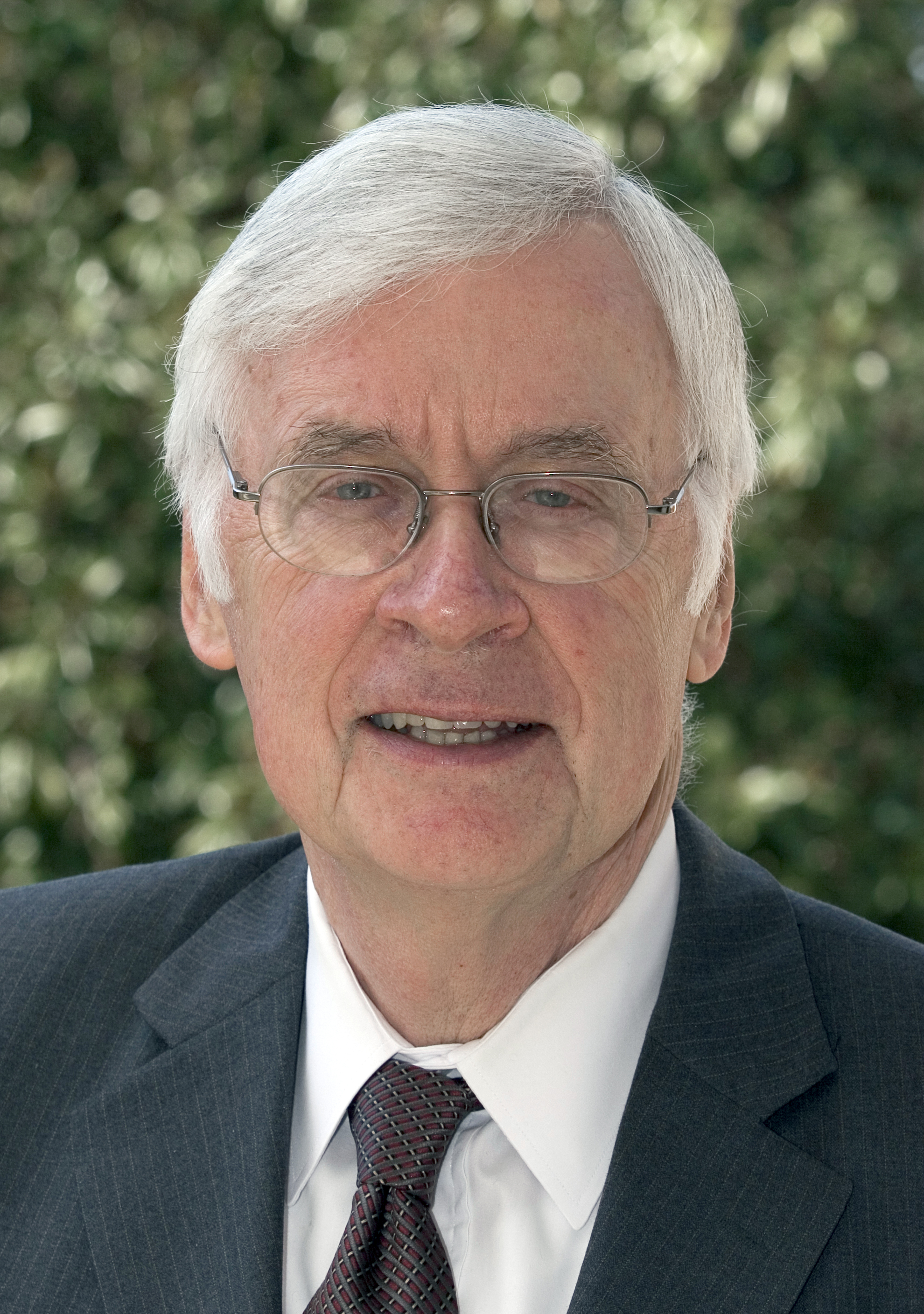

While some considered Baliles an attractive candidate for higher public office after his service as governor, Virginia's United States Senate seats were held by Democrat Chuck Robb, Baliles's predecessor as governor, and popular Republican John Warner. Baliles also chose against pursuing the Democratic nomination for President in 1992.

After his term as governor ended in 1990, Baliles returned to private law practice as a partner in the national firm Hunton & Williams based in Richmond, Virginia. He specialized in aviation and international law, negotiating agreements between airlines and airports, worked on strategic alliances between carriers, and led coalitions to expand market access and protect environmental standards. He also accepted some public service assignments, including as chair of the Commission to Ensure a Strong Competitive Airline Industry (National Airline) Commission for President Bill Clinton and Congress. In the early 1990s, Baliles served as chairman of the Public Infrastructure Subcouncil of the Competitiveness Policy Council. He also sat on the boards of the Norfolk Southern Corporation and Altria Group. Baliles also served two terms as the chairman of the board of the Public Broadcasting System.

An avid fisherman, throughout most of his professional life Baliles helped preserving the Chesapeake Bay. In 1995 he published Preserving the Chesapeake Bay. In 2004 Baliles served as chair of a blue-ribbon panel to raise money for the Bay cleanup, and in 2005 the Chesapeake Bay Foundation named him conservationist of the year. He also founded the Patrick County Education Foundation and served as chairman of the Commission on the Academic Presidency and for the Task Force on the State of the Presidency in Higher Education, for the Association of Governing Boards of Universities and Colleges. Baliles received eleven honorary degrees, including the Harry F. Byrd Public Service Award from the Virginia Military Institute in 2006.

Baliles became the Miller Center's fifth director in April 2006, and before his retirement on December 31, 2014, developed the "American Forum" television program (which ran for 6 years). Known for his civility and bipartisanship, Baliles also oversaw the publication of more than a dozen transcript volumes of White House tapes from the John F. Kennedy Lyndon B. Johnson and Richard M. Nixon presidencies and fostered its oral history program, including of presidents George H. W. Bush, Bill Clinton and George W. Bush, as well as the Edward M. Kennedy Oral History Project (released in 2015) and laid the groundwork for the Barack Obama Presidential Oral History Project. Earlier, the Miller Center in 2002 held a conference focusing on his governorship, which led to a 2003 documentary.

== Personal life ==
Baliles married twice. He had two children, Laura and Jonathan, with his first wife, Jeannie Baliles. In his final years, Governor Baliles and his second wife, Robin, split their time between Charlottesville, Virginia and Patrick County. His son Jon Baliles continued the family's political tradition, winning election to the Richmond City Council (a part-time position) in 2012, and currently is the city's Senior Policy Advisor for Innovation.

== Death ==
Baliles succumbed after a four-year battle with renal cell carcinoma and pulmonary fibrosis. He died in Charlottesville on October 29, 2019, while surrounded by his family. He was 79 years old. Virginia Governor Ralph Northam announced that state flags would fly at half mast until November 28, 2019, to honor Baliles' service to the Commonwealth.

== In popular culture ==
In the 1988 NBC Miniseries The Murder of Mary Phagan, filmed in the historical Shockoe Bottom section of Richmond, Baliles made a cameo appearance ("Sir, I'm from Virginia, and I protest") as an advocate for Leo Frank begging for his execution for the murder of Mary Phagan being halted due to an unfair trial and prejudice.

Legal offices
| Preceded by Marshall Coleman | Attorney General of Virginia; 1982–1985 | Succeeded by William Broaddus |
Party political offices
| Preceded by Chuck Robb | Democratic nominee for Governor of Virginia; 1985 | Succeeded by Douglas Wilder |
Political offices
| Preceded by Chuck Robb | Governor of Virginia; 1986–1990 | Succeeded by Douglas Wilder |
| Preceded by John H. Sununu | Chair of the National Governors Association; 1988–1989 | Succeeded by Terry Branstad |
