= Devore =

Devore may refer to:

- Devoré, a fabric technique
- Devore, San Bernardino, California
- Devore, Indiana
- Devore Peak, Washington
- De Vore Aviation, developer of the Verilite Sunbird
- DeVore & Sons, American Christian publishing company
- Weaver & Devore Trading, Canadian retail company

== People with the surname ==
- Albert Devore (1843–1916), New Zealand politician
- Ann G. DeVore (born 1936), American politician
- Billy Devore (1910–1985), American racing driver
- Chuck DeVore (born 1962), American politician
- Daniel Bradford Devore, (1860–1956), American brigadier general
- Don Devore, American musician
- Dorothy Devore (1899–1976), American silent film actress and comedian
- Doug DeVore (born 1977), American baseball player
- Earl Devore (1889–1928), American racing driver
- Edward A. DeVore Jr. (1947–1968), United States Army soldier and Medal of Honor recipient
- Gary DeVore (1941–1997), American Hollywood screenwriter
- Gary Devore (archaeologist) (born 1970), American archaeologist and author
- Glenn M. DeVore (1886–1950), American attorney and politician
- Howard DeVore (1925–2005), American archivist and writer
- Hugh Devore (1910–1992), American football player and coach
- Irven DeVore (1934–2014), American anthropologist and evolutionary biologist
- Jason DeVore, American musician and lead singer of punk band Authority Zero
- Josh Devore (1887–1954), American baseball player
- Kenneth I. Devore (1927–1997), American lawyer and politician
- Leland Devore (1889–1939), American college football player and military officer
- Nicholas DeVore III (1949–2003), American photographer
- Ophelia DeVore (1921–2014), American businesswoman, publisher, and model
- P. Cameron DeVore (1932–2008), American attorney
- Richard DeVore (1933–2006), American ceramicist and professor
- Robert Devore Leigh (1890–1961), American educator, political scientist, and leader in the field of library science
- Ronald DeVore (born 1941), American mathematician and academic
- Tiger Devore (born 1958), intersex activist
