= Gary Devore =

Gary Devore may refer to:

- Gary DeVore (1941–1997), Hollywood screenwriter
- Gary Devore (archaeologist) (born 1970), American archaeologist and author (also as Gary M Devore)

== See also ==
- Devore (disambiguation)
