= 1973 United States gubernatorial elections =

← 1972	November 6, 1973	1974 →

2 governorships
	Majority party	Minority party
Party	Democratic	Republican
Seats before	31	19
Seats after	32	18
Seat change	▲1	▼1
Seats up	0	2
Seats won	1	1
- Republican hold Democratic gain

United States gubernatorial elections were held 6 November 1973, in two states.

In Virginia, former Governor Mills E. Godwin, Jr., who was elected in the 1965 gubernatorial election as a Democrat, ran and won as a Republican. He defeated Henry Howell, who was also a former Democrat.

In New Jersey, the moderate incumbent Republican William T. Cahill was defeated in the primary by Charles W. Sandman Jr. Cahill did not campaign for Sandman, and Brendan Byrne defeated Sandman handily.

== Election results ==
State	Incumbent	Party	First elected	Result	Candidates
New Jersey	William T. Cahill	Republican	1969	Incumbent lost renomination. New governor elected.Democratic gain	✓ Brendan Byrne (Democratic) 66.40%; Charles W. Sandman Jr. (Republican) 32.13%; A. Howard Freund (American) 0.31%; Alfred V. Colabella (Independent) 0.24%; Robert Clement (Socialist Labor) 0.20%; John A. Goodson (Libertarian) 0.15%; James J. Terlizzi, Sr. (Independent Taxpayer's Watchdog) 0.13%
Virginia	Linwood Holton	Republican	1969	Incumbent term-limited. New governor elected. Republican hold	✓ Mills Godwin (Republican) 50.72%; Henry Howell (Independent) 49.28%

== Closest races ==
States where the margin of victory was under 5%:

1. Virginia, 1.44%

== New Jersey ==
1973 New Jersey gubernatorial election
← 1969	November 6, 1973	1977 →
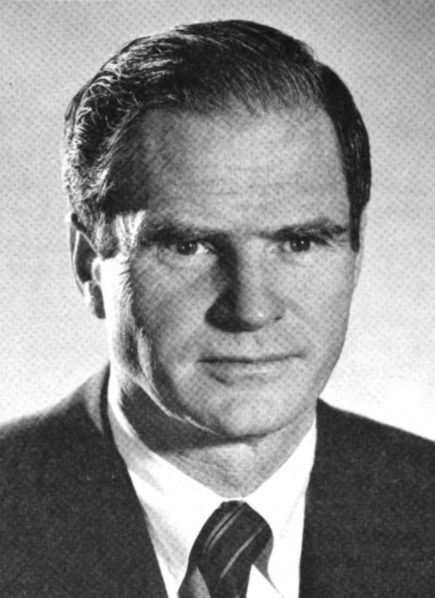

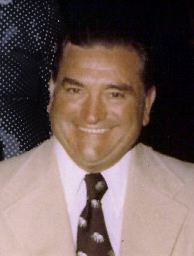
Nominee	Brendan Byrne	Charles W. Sandman Jr.
Party	Democratic	Republican
Popular vote	1,414,613	676,235
Percentage	66.7%	31.9%
- Byrne: 50–60% 60–70% 70–80% Sandman: 60–70%
Governor before election
William T. Cahill
Republican
Elected Governor
Brendan Byrne
Democratic

The 1973 New Jersey gubernatorial election was held on November 6, 1973. Incumbent Governor William T. Cahill ran for reelection, but was defeated in the Republican primary by Charles W. Sandman Jr. In the general election, Democratic nominee Brendan Byrne defeated Sandman with 66.67% of the vote.

== Virginia ==
1973 Virginia gubernatorial election
← 1969	November 6, 1973	1977 →
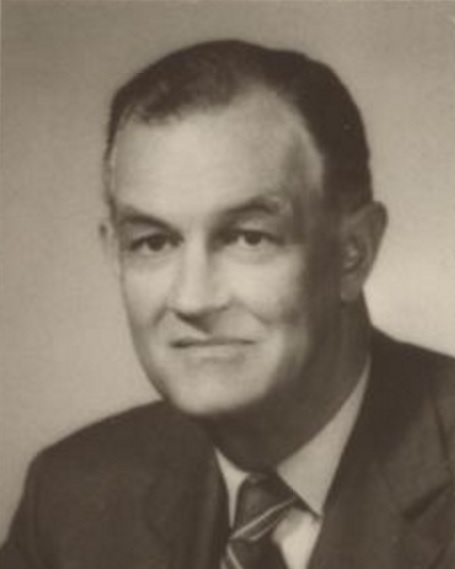

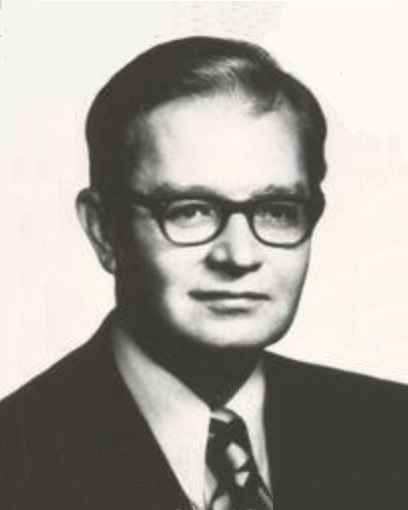
Nominee	Mills Godwin	Henry Howell
Party	Republican	Independent
Popular vote	525,075	510,103
Percentage	50.7%	49.3%
- County and independent city results Godwin: 50–60% 60–70% 70–80% Howell: 50–60% 60–70% 70–80%
Governor before election
Linwood Holton
Republican
Elected Governor
Mills Godwin
Republican

In the 1973 Virginia gubernatorial election, incumbent Governor A. Linwood Holton, Jr., a Republican, was unable to seek re-election due to term limits. Mills E. Godwin, Jr., former Democratic Governor of Virginia, was nominated by the Republican Party to run against Independent Lieutenant Governor of Virginia Henry Howell. The Democrats did not field a candidate, mostly choosing to support Howell's candidacy.

This was the last time until 2013 in which a member of the incumbent President's party was elected Governor of Virginia. It was also the last time a non-Democrat won the city of Alexandria.
