= Helen Hill Miller =

American journalist (1899–1995)

- Born: July 29, 1899; Lake Forest, Illinois, U.S.
- Died: December 26, 1995 (aged 96); Washington, D.C., U.S.
- Education: Bryn Mawr College (B.A., 1921); Oxford University (diploma, 1922); University of Chicago (Ph.D., 1928)
- Occupations: Journalist, author
- Spouse: Francis Pickens Miller
- Children: Andrew P. Miller, Robert Day Miller

Helen Hill Miller (July 29, 1899 – December 26, 1995) was a journalist and author of more than 20 books, but may be best known for her politician spouse and son. She would have become the First Lady of Virginia when her husband Francis Pickens Miller ran (unsuccessfully) in the Democratic primary in 1949 against the Byrd Organization candidate John S. Battle. In 1977, before his father's death, their son Andrew P. Miller, who served two terms as Attorney General of Virginia also lost in the Democratic gubernatorial primary (although his opponent, Henry Howell lost to Republican John N. Dalton).

== Early life and education ==
She was born to the former Lucia Elliott and her husband Russell Hill in Lake Forest, Illinois. She attended Bryn Mawr College and graduated in 1921, then taught at its summer school for Women Workers in 1921, 1923 and 1926. Hill then traveled across the Atlantic Ocean to study in Europe, including at Oxford University (from which she received a diploma in Economics and Political Science in 1922, as well as began the courtship described below). Although Hill continued to travel and study in Europe until 1930, she also attended the University of Chicago and earned her PhD in 1928.

== Career ==
Following their marriage, Miller and her Kentucky-native husband moved to then-rural Fairfax County, Virginia in 1929, buying a 10 acres and reconstructing an old tavern scheduled for demolition on their property, which they operated as a dairy farm and which later became Flint Hill School and still later was acquired by AT&T.

Until 1934, two years after the birth of their second son, Miller was a freelance writer. She then accepted a staff position with the United States Department of Agriculture, across the Potomac River in Washington, D.C., writing articles as well as speeches and press releases intermittently until 1940. When an expected job in Geneva working for the League of Nations failed to materialize, Miller reviewed foreign books for the Saturday Review. In 1938, unemployed in Washington, she published her first book, 'George Mason: Constitutionalist'.

During World War II, while her husband served overseas, Miller was executive director of the National Policy Committee (1941–1947). Miller also was an American correspondent for the British magazine The Economist (1943–1950), as well as an economic writer for Newsweek's Washington bureau. The Atlantic Monthly, Virginia Quarterly and other journals also published her articles on history and economics. From 1950 until 1952 Miller was Newsweek's Washington Bureau correspondent. A member of the Women's National Press Club, she served as its president 1955–1956. In the 1950s Harper's Magazine and Esquire Magazine also published her freelance articles, and she was a contributing editor to the New Republic (1958-mid-1960s). Miller returned to federal employment as a writer for the President's Commission on the Status of Women (1960–1962).

When her husband, Col. Francis Pickens Miller (who had won election to the Virginia House of Delegates after World War II) decided to take on the powerful Byrd Organization, Miller became immersed in politics. Although her husband lost in the Democratic primary to Byrd Organization loyalist John S. Battle (who won the gubernatorial election in 1949), he ran again, this time for the U.S. Senate seat occupied by powerful and long-time U.S. Senator Harry Byrd (who had served as Virginia's governor before the couple had moved to Virginia, where they raised their sons). Miller also served on the governing boards of George Mason University and Bryn Mawr College, and was among the first women admitted to Washington's exclusive Cosmos Club.

Miller wrote more than 20 books concerning history and travel, including three biographies of founding father George Mason and six books about Greece.

== Personal life ==
While at Oxford University she met Kentucky-born Francis Pickens Miller, descended from generations of Virginians. He courted her for five years before they married, and the marriage continued until his death five decades later. They had two sons who survived their parents. Robert Miller became a Presbyterian minister and Pickens Miller became Attorney General of Virginia in 1970 and won re-election by a resounding margin, but in 1977 lost in the Democratic gubernatorial primary to Henry Howell, who in turn lost to Republican John Dalton.

== Death and legacy ==
Following her husband's retirement, the Millers divided their time between houses in the Georgetown neighborhood of Washington, D.C. and Kitty Hawk, North Carolina. He died in 1978, but Miller continued to write, as well as to revise previously published books. Her final book, 'Washington Observed' was submitted to a publisher shortly before she suffered a stroke, but never published. Miller died at the George Washington University Medical Center on December 26, 1995, survived by her two sons and nine grandchildren.

Beginning in 1963, Miller began donating papers to the Schlesinger Library, then associated with Radcliffe College, and now part of the Harvard University Library. Bryn Mawr College's Special Collections also has some of her papers.

== Published works ==
- America's Maginot Lines (No. 9 in America in a World at War series, Farrar, Straus, 1941)
- Bridge to Asia: the Greeks in the Eastern Mediterranean (New York, Scribner, 1967)
- Captains from Devon: the Great Elizabethan Seafarers Who Won the Oceans for England (Algonquian Books of Chapel Hill, 1985)
- The Case for Liberty (University of North Carolina Press, 1965)
- Colonel Parke of Virginia: the Greatest Hector in the Town (Algonquian Books of Chapel Hill, 1989)
- Effect of the Bryn Mawr Summer School as measured in the activities of its students (New York Associations, 1929)
- Foreign Trade and the Worker's Job (World Peace Foundation, 1935)
- France: Crossroads of a Continent (Foreign Policy Association, 1944)
- George Mason: Constitutionalist (Harvard University Press, 1938)(also Gloucester Massachusetts, 1966)
- George Mason: Gentleman Revolutionary (University of North Carolina Press, 1975)
- George Mason of Gunston Hall (Board of Regents of Gunston Hall, 1958)
- Greece (Scribner, 1965)
- Greece Through the Ages: As Seen by Travelers from Herodotus to Byron (New York: Funk & Wagnal, 1972)(also London: Dent, 1972)
- Greek Horizons (New York: Scribner, 1961)
- Historic Places Around the Outer Banks (Charlotte: McNally & Loftin, 1975)
- Kitchen in War Production (Public Affairs Committee, 1943)
- Passage to America: Raleigh's Colonists Take Ship for Roanoke (Raleigh: America's 400th Anniversary Committee, 1983)
- Realms of Arthur (New York: Scribner, 1969) also (London: P. Davies, 1970)
- Sicily and the Western Colonies of Greece (Scribner, 1965)
- Yours for Tomorrow: A Personal Testament of Freedom (Farrar & Rinehart, 1943)
