= Francis Pickens Miller =

American politician

Francis P. Miller
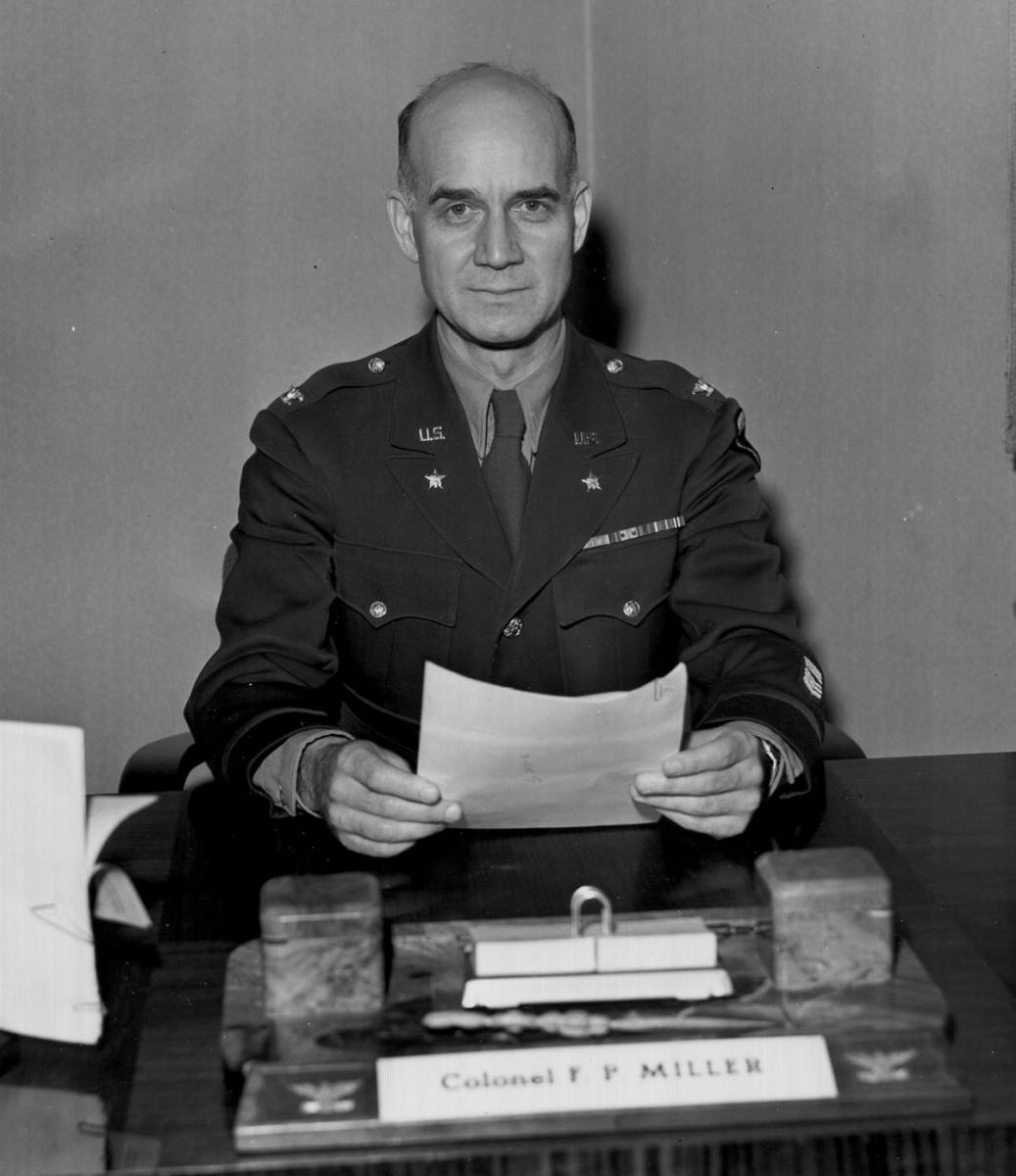
- Miller, shortly after the success of Operation SUSSEX

Member of the Virginia House of Delegates from Fairfax County
- In office January 12, 1938 – January 13, 1942
- Preceded by: John C. Mackall
- Succeeded by: Robert J. McCandlish Jr.

Personal details
- Born: Francis Pickens Miller; June 5, 1895 Middlesboro, Kentucky, US
- Died: August 3, 1978 (aged 83) Norfolk, Virginia, US
- Party: Democratic
- Spouse: Helen Day Hill (m. 1927)
- Children: 2, including Andrew
- Education: Washington and Lee University; Trinity College, Oxford
- Awards: Croix de Guerre; Legion of Merit; Order of the British Empire; Legion of Honour

Military service
- Allegiance: United States
- Branch/service: United States Army; Office of Strategic Services
- Rank: Colonel
- Battles/wars: World War I; World War II; Operation SUSSEX

Francis Pickens Miller (June 5, 1895 – August 3, 1978) was an American military and intelligence officer and Virginia politician who served in the Virginia House of Delegates for two terms (from 1938 until 1942), representing Fairfax County, Virginia. He became one of the leading Democratic critics of the Byrd Organization (sometimes called "antis"), and unsuccessfully ran in the Democratic primaries for Virginia Governor in 1949 against John S. Battle and U.S. Senator against Harry F. Byrd in 1952.

== Early and family life ==
Born in Middlesboro, Bell County, Kentucky to Rev. Henry Miller (1855–1911) (a Presbyterian clergyman and son of a Presbyterian clergyman) and his wife the former Flora B. McElwee (1861–1890), Francis Pickens Miller was descended from Capt. William Moore, who served during the American Revolutionary War in the militia from Rockbridge County, Virginia, across the Cumberland Gap from his great-grandson's birthplace. Young Francis Miller was educated in Rockbridge County and attended Washington and Lee University, from which he received a B.S. in 1914. He then became a Rhodes Scholar and received a degree from Oxford University.

While in Europe, he met American journalist Helen Hill, and they married in 1927 in Oxfordshire, England. They would remain married until his death more than five decades later, and have sons Andrew P. Miller and Robert D. Miller.

== Career ==
Miller served during World War I in the 5th Field Artillery Regiment of the American Expeditionary Force, rising through the enlisted ranks (private, corporal, sergeant major) to become an officer (2nd then 1st lieutenant in the 58th Coast Artillery Corps).

From 1928 until 1938, Miller served as chairman of the World Student Christian Federation, and would remain active in his Presbyterian Church throughout his life, as well as publish in Presbyterian Life.

Miller was the organizer and the executive secretary of the National Policy Committee, and helped found the Council on Foreign Relations, whose chief executive he became. During the 1930s, Miller also strongly spoke out against Adolf Hitler and urged war preparedness. He realized that Virginia's U.S. Senator Harry F. Byrd's close financial scrutiny was "nickel and dimming" national war preparedness, because of the Senator's hatred of the administration of Franklin D. Roosevelt, although a fellow Democrat.

While in the Virginia General Assembly (a part-time position) beginning in 1938, Miller allied with Virginia Governor James H. Price, who supported the New Deal despite the opposition of U.S. Senator Harry F. Byrd and his Byrd Organization, which prided itself on low tax rates and cared little about funding human welfare programs. During the Great Depression, Virginia was the 8th lowest in the country in terms of residents on general relief, and ranked 32nd nationally in the amount of state funds obligated for relief. Delegate Miller joined with editors Virginius Dabney and Douglas Southall Freeman, labor commissioner Hall and Virginia Tech's William Garnett to found the Virginia Consumers League. They lobbied for financial security legislation, and succeeded in establishing an Unemployment Compensation Commission in 1938. Miller also helped increase teachers' pay, aid rural libraries and create both a probation and parole system and a merit personnel system for state employees.

Richard R. Farr defeated Miller in 1942, but died before taking his seat. Thus, Robert J. McCandlish Jr. replaced him as Fairfax's delegate in the General Assembly.

During World War II, Miller served for three years (1942–1945) as an intelligence officer with the Office of Strategic Services and the SHAEF. Promoted to the rank of colonel, Miller served on the staff of General Dwight Eisenhower. Miller became the U.S. representative on the Tripartite Control Committee for Operation Sussex.

In 1946, Miller moved his family from the stone farmhouse near Fairfax city where they had lived for decades, to Charlottesville, Virginia, location of the U.S. Army's Officer Candidate School and (beginning in the 1960s) the United States Army Foreign Science and Technology Center. In his 1948 application for membership in the Sons of the American Revolution, Miller characterized his occupation as "MI-Res" and as a writer. He and his wife would also live for a time in Washington, D.C. before their retirement.

After President Harry S. Truman took office upon President Franklin D. Roosevelt's death, and particularly after Truman was elected on his own behalf in 1948 (despite the opposition of the Byrd Organization which was appalled by his support for civil rights legislation), Miller thought he and other "anti's" (including state senators Robert Whitehead and Lloyd M. Robinette) could take over and liberalize the state Democratic party. That never happened, in part because of lack of patronage and financial support from the national Democratic party, in part because the era of Massive Resistance had begun.

In February 1949, Miller announced his candidacy for Governor of Virginia. However, with the assistance of Virginia Beach boss Sidney Kellam (U.S. Senator Byrd technically remaining neutral), John S. Battle defeated Miller and two lesser opponents in the Democratic primary. Battle depicted Miller as a liberal and controlled by labor unions, and nearly ignored his other opponents (Horace Edwards and Petersburg businessman Remmie Arnold). Prominent Republican Henry Wise of Virginia's Eastern Shore even urged his supporters to vote for Battle in the Democratic primary to repel the "invasion by aliens." Battle won 43% of the vote; Miller 35%, Edwards 15% and Arnold 7%.

Undeterred, Miller announced a run against U.S. Senator Byrd himself in 1952, characterizing the powerful senator's record as one of "isolation and indifference." Byrd's allies in the Virginia General Assembly moved the primary from early August to July 15, and Byrd rebuffed Miller's offer to debate, instead delivering over 300 speeches across the Commonwealth (sometimes as many as eight in a day). Byrd handily defeated Miller, winning 63% of the vote. That marked the demise of the "anti's", although their other goals (increased education funding, end of the poll tax, and end of political machine rule) would be achieved a decade later as the Byrd Organization collapsed at the end of Massive Resistance.

== Final years, death and legacy ==
The University of North Carolina Press published Miler's autobiography Man from the Valley in 1971, which he dedicated to his wife, correspondent Helen Hill Miller.

When both retired, they moved to near Kitty Hawk, North Carolina. There Miller suffered a stroke about two weeks after witnessing his son Andrew P. Miller win his party's nomination for U.S. Senator (although Republican John Warner would win what became a close contest). Hospitalized, Francis Pickens Miller died of pneumonia (and another stroke) in Norfolk, Virginia on August 3, 1978. He was survived by his wife (Helen Hill Miller), both sons and numerous grandchildren. A memorial service was held at Richmond's Union Theological Seminary, at which Rev. John H. Leith extolled Miller's patriotism and love of the Commonwealth and its liberal democratic tradition (ranging from Thomas Jefferson and Rev. John Witherspoon to James Madison, George Mason and Woodrow Wilson), as well as describing how Miller worked for economic justice but never played it off against liberty. He also explained Miller as guided by Calvinism—both its emphasis on simplicity and its abhorrence of pretense and ostentation.

His son Andrew P. Miller had become a lawyer, and in 1969 had been elected Virginia's attorney general to succeed segregationist Robert Young Button. Although re-elected to the Virginia Attorney General position, Andrew P. Miller like his father lost a Democratic primary for Governor (in 1977 to Lieutenant Governor Henry Howell, who lost the general election to Republican John N. Dalton). The George Marshall Foundation maintains Francis Pickens Miller's papers relating to his military and federal service; the University of Virginia's Alderman library has records relating to his political career.

Virginia House of Delegates
Preceded by John C. Mackall	Representing Fairfax; 1938-42	Succeeded by Robert J. McCandlish Jr.
