= 1977 Virginia ballot measures =

The 1977 Virginia State Elections took place on Election Day, November 8, 1977, the same day as the Gubernatorial, Lieutenant gubernatorial, Attorney General and Virginia House of Delegates elections, which are always held in off-years. The only other statewide elections on the ballot were five government bond referendums, which were referred to the voters by the Virginia General Assembly.

== Bond Question 1 ==
The Educational Facilities Act allows the Commonwealth to sell a maximum of $86,475,000 dollars in bonds for the purpose of raising funds to pay for capital projects at state-supported colleges, universities, museums and other educational facilities.

Question 1
Choice	Votes	%
For	594,098	67.63
Against	284,375	32.37
Total	878,473	100.00
Source: - Official Results

== Bond Question 2 ==
Voters were asked the following question:

"Shall Chapter 651, Acts of the General Assembly of 1977, authorizing the issuance of general obligation bonds of the Commonwealth of Virginia in the maximum amount of $21,525,000 pursuant to Article X, Section 9(b) of the Constitution of Virginia for correctional facilities, take effect?"

Question 2
Choice	Votes	%
For	537,172	63.78
Against	305,055	36.22
Total	842,227	100.00
Source: - Official Results

== Bond Question 3 ==
Voters were asked the following question:

"Shall Chapter 652, Acts of the General Assembly of 1977, authorizing the issuance of general obligation bonds of the Commonwealth of Virginia in the maximum amount of $4,000,000 pursuant to Article X, Section 9(b) of the Constitution of Virginia for mental health facilities, take effect?"

Question 3
Choice	Votes	%
For	623,139	73.13
Against	228,953	26.87
Total	852,092	100.00
Source: - Official Results

== Bond Question 4 ==
The Parks and Recreational Facilities Act allows the Commonwealth to sell a maximum of $5,000,000 dollars in bonds for the purpose of raising funds to pay for capital projects at state-supported parks and recreational facilities.

Question 4
Choice	Votes	%
For	531,176	63.46
Against	305,883	36.54
Total	837,059	100.00
Source: - Official Results

== Bond Question 5 ==
Voters were asked the following question:

"Shall Chapter 654, Acts of the General Assembly of 1977, authorizing the issuance of general obligation bonds of the Commonwealth of Virginia in the maximum amount of $8,000,000 pursuant to Article X, Section 9(b) of the Constitution of Virginia for port facilities, take effect?"

Question 5
Choice	Votes	%
For	491,962	60.04
Against	327,431	39.96
Total	819,393	100.00
Source: - Official Results
