= John L. Whitehead =

American politician

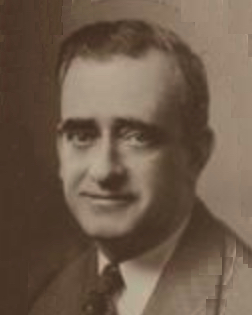
- Portrait of Whitehead, c. 1956

Member of the Virginia House of Delegates for Montgomery and Radford City
- In office January 9, 1952 – January 8, 1958
- Preceded by: Bentley Hite
- Succeeded by: Charlotte Giesen

Personal details
- Born: John Lewis Whitehead; February 10, 1907 Chatham, Virginia, U.S.
- Died: August 9, 1988 (aged 81) Radford, Virginia, U.S.
- Party: Democratic
- Spouse: Mary Shelton
- Parent: Joseph Whitehead (father)
- Education: George Washington University

John Lewis Whitehead (February 10, 1907 – August 9, 1988) was an American politician. The son of Congressman Joseph Whitehead, he represented Montgomery County and Radford in the Virginia House of Delegates for three terms until his defeat for reelection by Charlotte Giesen.

Virginia House of Delegates
Preceded by Bentley Hite	Virginia Delegate for Montgomery and Radford City; 1952–1958	Succeeded by Charlotte Giesen
