= Anthony Francis Troy =

32nd Attorney General of Virginia

32nd Attorney General of Virginia
- In office January 26, 1977 – January 14, 1978
- Governor: Mills Godwin
- Preceded by: Andrew P. Miller
- Succeeded by: Marshall Coleman

Personal details
- Born: 1941 (age 84–85) Chesterfield County
- Party: Democratic
- Education: University of Richmond School of Law
- Nickname: Tony

Anthony Francis Troy is a registered Democrat and former attorney general of the Commonwealth of Virginia.

== Early life ==
Tony was born in Chesterfield County, Virginia in 1941. He graduated from St. Michael's College, and later the University of Richmond School of Law. He soon joined the Democratic Party.

== Career ==
Troy was chief deputy to the top lawyer in Virginia in 1976, and was the defense attorney in Baker v. Commonwealth of Virginia.

In order to finish the term of Andrew P. Miller post-resignation, the Virginia General Assembly appointed Troy to serve as Attorney General of Virginia. Troy held the office from January 26, 1977, until January 14, 1978, when he was replaced by Marshall Coleman.

Troy developed a practice surrounding client issues with State Attorney General offices. In addition to representing clients in cases, Troy's practice included commercial advertising, election law, antitrust, first amendment, and other litigation.

== Present day ==
Troy was recognized as being one of the top lobbyists in Virginia. Troy served on the board of trustees of Virginia Intermont College until it was shut down in 2014. He was also a trustee with the Science Museum of Virginia.

Troy works with several prominent law firms, including The Stanley Law Group and Troutman Sanders.
