= Bentley Hite =

American lawyer and politician (1900–1992)

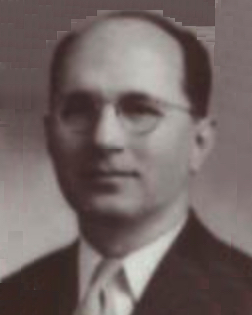

Member of the Virginia House of Delegates for Montgomery and Radford City
- In office January 14, 1948 – January 9, 1952
- Preceded by: John B. Spiers
- Succeeded by: John L. Whitehead
- In office February 1930 – January 13, 1932
- Preceded by: Allen I. Harless
- Succeeded by: James Zoll

Personal details
- Born: December 26, 1900 Montgomery, Virginia, U.S.
- Died: February 18, 1992 (aged 91)
- Party: Republican
- Spouse: Cassandra Harman (m. 1951)
- Education: Roanoke College; University of Virginia

Military service
- Allegiance: United States
- Branch/service: United States Navy
- Rank: Commander
- Battles/wars: World War II

Bentley Hite (December 26, 1900 – February 18, 1992) was an American attorney and politician. He represented his native Montgomery County and Radford in the Virginia House of Delegates, first from 1930 to 1932, after the death of Allen I. Harless, and then from 1948 to 1952.

Virginia House of Delegates
Preceded by Allen I. Harless	Virginia Delegate for Montgomery and Radford City; 1930–1932; 1948–1952	Succeeded by James Zoll
Preceded by John B. Spiers	Virginia Delegate for Montgomery and Radford City; 1930–1932; 1948–1952	Succeeded by John L. Whitehead
