= Joseph Whitehead (Virginia politician) =

American politician

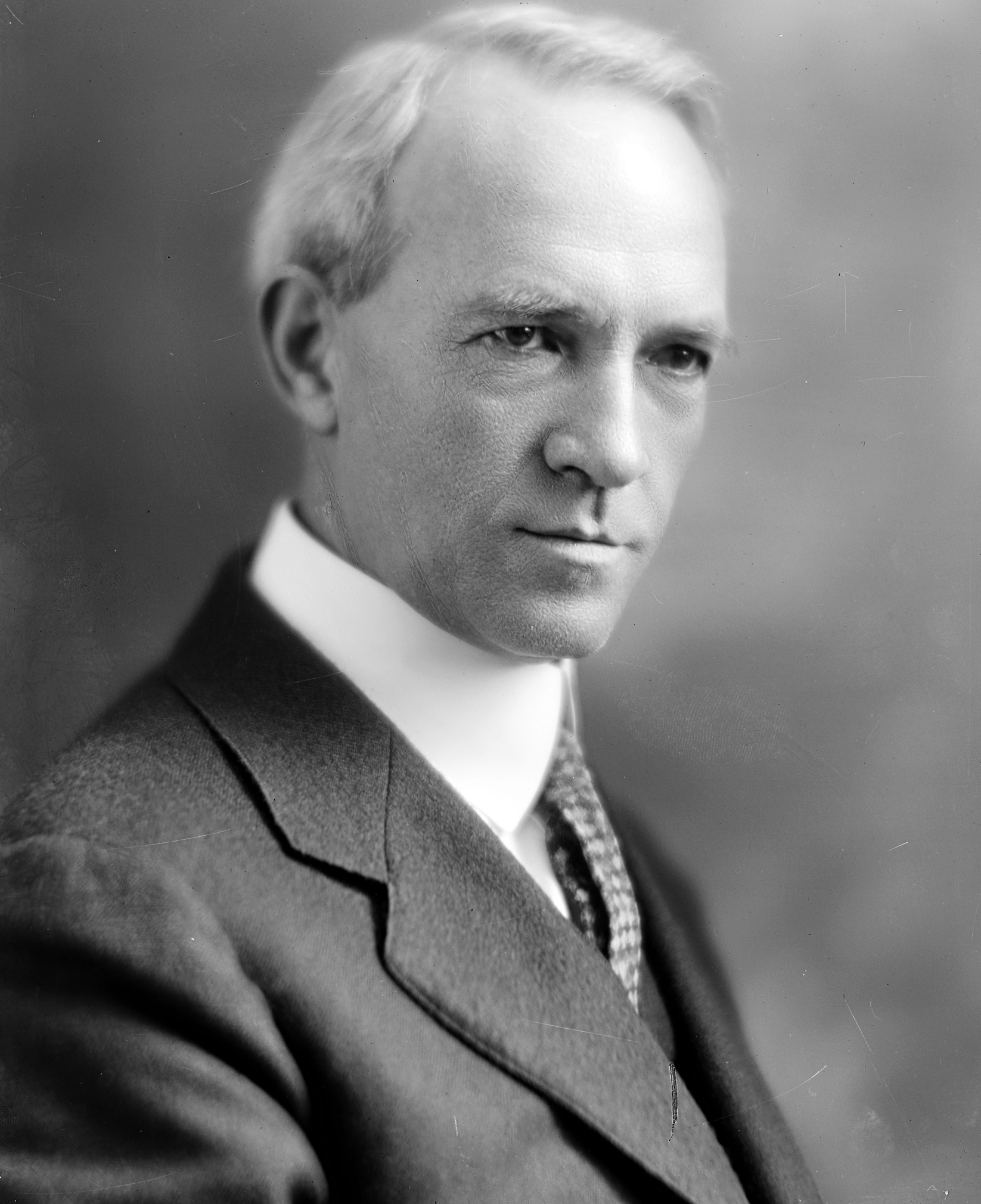

Member of the U.S. House of Representatives from Virginia's 5th district
- In office March 4, 1925 – March 3, 1931
- Preceded by: J. Murray Hooker
- Succeeded by: Thomas G. Burch

Member of the Virginia Senate from the 24th district
- In office December 6, 1899 – January 13, 1904
- Preceded by: Eugene Withers
- Succeeded by: George T. Rison

Personal details
- Born: October 31, 1867 Mount Airy, Pittsylvania County, Virginia
- Died: July 8, 1938 (aged 70) Chatham, Virginia
- Party: Democratic
- Children: John
- Education: Richmond College, University of Virginia
- Profession: lawyer

Joseph Whitehead (October 31, 1867 – July 8, 1938) was a United States representative from Virginia, serving from 1925 to 1931.

== Biography ==
Whitehead was born near Mount Airy, Pittsylvania County, Va., October 31, 1867. He attended the public schools of his native city and graduated from the academic department of Richmond College (now the University of Richmond), Richmond, Va., in 1889, then from the law department of the University of Virginia at Charlottesville in 1892. He was admitted to the bar the same year and commenced the practice of law in Chatham, Virginia. He became law partners with Claude A. Swanson.

From 1899-1904 he served in the State senate, representing Pittsylvania County and the City of Danville. He was elected as a Democrat to the Sixty-ninth, Seventieth, and Seventy-first Congresses (March 4, 1925 – March 3, 1931), then was an unsuccessful candidate for renomination in 1930. He resumed the practice of his chosen profession until his death at Danville Memorial Hospital in Danville, Va., on July 22, 1938, he was interred in Chatham Cemetery.

== Electoral history ==
- 1924; Whitehead was elected to the U.S. House of Representatives with 75.96% of the vote, defeating Republican G.A. DeHart.
- 1926; Whitehead was re-elected unopposed.
- 1928; Whitehead was re-elected with 54.27% of the vote, defeating Republican Taylor G. Vaughan and Independent Cabell Staples.

== Sources ==
- United States Congress. "Joseph Whitehead (id: W000400)". Biographical Directory of the United States Congress.

U.S. House of Representatives
Preceded by J. Murray Hooker	Member of the U.S. House of Representatives from Virginia's 5th congressional district 1925–1931	Succeeded by Thomas G. Burch
