= 1971 Virginia lieutenant gubernatorial special election =

- November 2, 1971
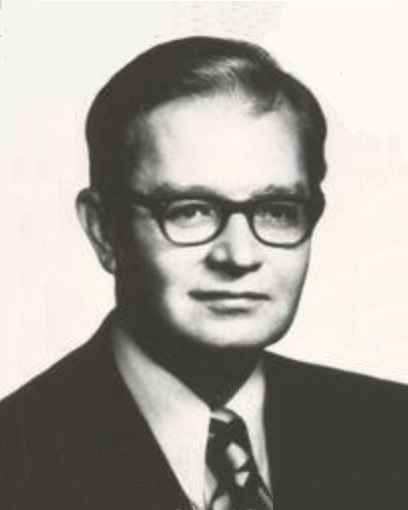

Nominee	Henry Howell	George J. Kostel	George P. Shafran
Party	Independent	Democratic	Republican
Popular vote	362,371	334,580	209,861
Percentage	39.96%	36.89%	23.14%
- County and independent city results Howell: 30–40% 40–50% 50–60% 60–70% 70–80% Kostel: 30–40% 40–50% 50–60% 60–70% 70–80% Shafran: 30–40% 40–50% 50–60%

The 1971 Virginia lieutenant gubernatorial special election was held on November 2, 1971, to elect the next Lieutenant Governor of Virginia following the death of incumbent J. Sargeant Reynolds on June 13. The election was concurrent with the 1971 Virginia Senate election and 1971 Virginia House of Delegates election. Independent candidate Henry Howell won against both Democratic nominee George J. Kostel and Republican nominee George P. Shafran.

== Background ==
J. Sergeant Reynolds had been elected as a Democrat to the Virginia House of Delegates in 1965, at a time of profound political change in Virginia due to the Twenty-fourth Amendment and the Voting Rights Act greatly expanding an electorate that had previously been proportionately the smallest in the country due to poll taxes and literacy tests.

In 1969, Sargeant Reynolds had been the only candidate to gain a majority in the first Democratic party primary, and gained statewide office in spite of the first non-Democratic gubernatorial win since 1881. He was universally seen as the Democrats' best hope to recapture the governors' mansion in 1973, but eight months into his tenure as lieutenant governor a desperate shock would occur when it was discovered he had a brain tumor. Doctors always ruled out surgery and hoped that radiation treatment and rest would solve the problem, but ultimately Reynolds would die at the age of just thirty-four on June 13.

With the death of Reynolds, confusion emerged over how to select candidates. State Senator and defeated 1969 Democratic gubernatorial primary candidate Henry Howell had already considered an independent run by the end of June, especially as he believed a convention of Democratic regulars would fail to nominate him. By mid-July, it had been announced that no primary election would be held and the Democratic party would nominate its candidate by convention on August 14. In this convention, a little-known forty-three-year-old from Clifton Forge who had entered the race only eight days previously, George J. Kostel, prevailed over three conservative and one liberal challengers on the fourth ballot.

The previous day, Howell announced he had obtained sufficient signatures to file and obtain ballot access as an independent candidate. whilst the Republican Party caucus saw five potential nominees identified by August 17, although the conservative pro-Byrd junior George Mason Green and the more moderate George P. Shafran had emerged as frontrunners two weeks earlier, with the party arguing Howell's candidacy produced a need for wide appeal. Backed privately by sitting governor Linwood Holton, Shafran would claim the nomination on the second ballot on August 21.

== Campaign ==
From the beginning, Howell's hope was to hold the labor backing that turned to Holton in the 1969 gubernatorial election after Howell lost the primary. This he would gain from the AFL-CIO in the final week of August, when it was known that both Kostel and Shafran supported Virginia's existing right-to-work law.

By the second week of September, all three candidates were heavily campaigning across the state. Howell would speak in his typical flamboyant style, focusing on the utility and banks, who he felt were operating without necessary contraints, as part of his message of "keeping the big boys honest". (Note: The "big boys" Howell attacked were the major industrial businessmen centred in the state capital of Richmond.) Kostel would deny this as the candidates travelled around the state. Shafran and Kostel made busing into a major issue, with Shafran strongly condemning it, whilst Howell attempted strongly to evade it.

== Polls ==
Source	Ranking	As of
The Roanoke Times	Likely I	October 22, 1971
Bullet	Likely I	October 25, 1971
Pomona Progress-Bulletin	Likely I	October 31, 1971

== General election ==
=== Candidates ===
- Henry Howell (Independent), State Senator from Norfolk City
- George J. Kostel (Democratic), State Delegate from Clifton Forge City
- George P. Shafran (Republican), State Delegate and former real estate agent from Arlington County

=== Results ===
1971 Virginia lieutenant gubernatorial special election
Party	Candidate	Votes	%	±%
Independent	Henry Howell	362,371	39.95%	
Democratic	George J. Kostel	334,580	36.89%	
Republican	George P. Shafran	209,861	23.14%	
Majority		27,791	3.06%	
Turnout		906,893	34.89%	+3.49%
Independent gain from Democratic		Swing		

==== Results by county or independent city ====
1971 Virginia lieutenant gubernatorial special election by county or independent city
	George J. Kostel Democratic		George P. Shafran Republican		Henry Evans Howell, Jr. Independent		Various candidates Write-ins		Margin (Note: Because Howell won the election as an independent and Kostel ran second in the state as a whole, all margins are Kostel vote minus Howell vote and all percentage margins Kostel percentage minus Howell percentage unless stated otherwise for the county or city in question.)		Total votes cast
	#	%	#	%	#	%	#	%	#	%	Total votes cast
Accomack County	2,499	36.70%	870	12.78%	3,441	50.53%			-942	-13.83%	6,810
Albemarle County	2,883	36.54%	1,691	21.43%	3,315	42.02%			-432	-5.48%	7,889
Alleghany County	2,165	59.28%	372	10.19%	1,115	30.53%			1,050	28.75%	3,652
Amelia County	991	45.50%	224	10.28%	963	44.21%			28	1.29%	2,178
Amherst County	2,195	46.13%	853	17.93%	1,710	35.94%			485	10.19%	4,758
Appomattox County	2,127	59.26%	293	8.16%	1,168	32.54%	1	0.03%	959	26.72%	3,589
Arlington County	7,186	22.43%	13,543	42.28%	11,302	35.28%	1	0.00%	2,241 (Note: In this county or city where Kostel ran third behind both Shafran and Howell, margin given is Shafran vote minus Howell vote and percentage margin Shafran percentage minus Howell percentage.)	7.00%	32,032
Augusta County	2,782	34.42%	3,042	37.64%	2,258	27.94%			-260 (Note: In this county or city where Howell did run third behind Kostel and Shafran, margin given is Kostel vote minus Shafran vote and percentage margin Kostel percentage minus Shafran percentage.)	-3.22%	8,082
Bath County	1,110	59.49%	289	15.49%	467	25.03%			643	34.46%	1,866
Bedford County	2,181	39.15%	1,068	19.17%	2,322	41.68%			-141	-2.53%	5,571
Bland County	604	30.88%	562	28.73%	790	40.39%			-186	-9.51%	1,956
Botetourt County	2,383	44.09%	1,234	22.83%	1,788	33.08%			595	11.01%	5,405
Brunswick County	2,575	41.30%	407	6.53%	3,253	52.17%			-678	-10.87%	6,235
Buchanan County	4,502	58.47%	2,451	31.83%	747	9.70%			2,051	26.64%	7,700
Buckingham County	1,590	45.78%	285	8.21%	1,598	46.01%			-8	-0.23%	3,473
Campbell County	4,214	46.52%	2,104	23.23%	2,740	30.25%			1,474	16.27%	9,058
Caroline County	1,056	30.96%	296	8.68%	2,059	60.36%			-1,003	-29.40%	3,411
Carroll County	1,333	27.20%	2,512	51.27%	1,055	21.53%			-1,179	-24.06%	4,900
Charles City County	310	17.82%	170	9.77%	1,260	72.41%			-950	-54.60%	1,740
Charlotte County	1,597	43.10%	408	11.01%	1,700	45.88%			-103	-2.78%	3,705
Chesterfield County	8,130	51.56%	2,266	14.37%	5,373	34.07%			2,757	17.48%	15,769
Clarke County	1,319	46.66%	633	22.39%	875	30.95%			444	15.71%	2,827
Craig County	555	41.48%	297	22.20%	486	36.32%			69	5.16%	1,338
Culpeper County	1,712	48.20%	772	21.73%	1,068	30.07%			644	18.13%	3,552
Cumberland County	788	41.69%	154	8.15%	948	50.16%			-160	-8.47%	1,890
Dickenson County	2,673	38.81%	3,133	45.49%	1,081	15.70%			-460	-6.68%	6,887
Dinwiddie County	2,212	40.80%	476	8.78%	2,732	50.40%	1	0.02%	-520	-9.59%	5,421
Essex County	942	41.87%	350	15.56%	958	42.58%			-16	-0.71%	2,250
Fairfax County	13,973	21.30%	26,261	40.03%	25,373	38.67%			888	1.35%	65,607
Fauquier County	2,135	41.42%	1,232	23.90%	1,788	34.68%			347	6.73%	5,155
Floyd County	779	22.98%	1,231	36.31%	1,380	40.71%			-149	-4.40%	3,390
Fluvanna County	578	40.33%	248	17.31%	607	42.36%			-29	-2.02%	1,433
Franklin County	3,607	48.52%	1,426	19.18%	2,401	32.30%			1,206	16.22%	7,434
Frederick County	1,539	31.80%	1,144	23.64%	2,156	44.55%			-617	-12.75%	4,839
Giles County	1,974	33.28%	1,492	25.15%	2,466	41.57%			-492	-8.29%	5,932
Gloucester County	1,219	31.43%	668	17.23%	1,991	51.34%			-772	-19.91%	3,878
Goochland County	1,141	40.76%	320	11.43%	1,338	47.80%			-197	-7.04%	2,799
Grayson County	2,155	40.58%	2,351	44.27%	805	15.16%			-196	-3.69%	5,311
Greene County	455	25.31%	371	20.63%	972	54.06%			-517	-28.75%	1,798
Greensville County	973	36.65%	210	7.91%	1,472	55.44%			-499	-18.79%	2,655
Halifax County	2,553	41.89%	668	10.96%	2,872	47.13%	1	0.02%	-319	-5.23%	6,094
Hanover County	4,404	52.11%	1,083	12.82%	2,964	35.07%			1,440	17.04%	8,451
Henrico County	20,428	61.07%	4,805	14.37%	8,216	24.56%			12,212	36.51%	33,449
Henry County	3,366	35.41%	1,890	19.88%	4,251	44.71%			-885	-9.31%	9,507
Highland County	304	32.31%	397	42.19%	240	25.50%			-93	-9.88%	941
Isle of Wight County	1,573	31.52%	573	11.48%	2,839	56.89%	5	0.10%	-1,266	-25.37%	4,990
James City County	1,052	30.67%	619	18.05%	1,758	51.25%	1	0.03%	-706	-20.58%	3,430
King and Queen County	560	35.78%	207	13.23%	796	50.86%	2	0.13%	-236	-15.08%	1,565
King George County	488	24.89%	364	18.56%	1,109	56.55%			-621	-31.67%	1,961
King William County	866	41.16%	260	12.36%	978	46.48%			-112	-5.32%	2,104
Lancaster County	1,258	40.17%	547	17.46%	1,327	42.37%			-69	-2.20%	3,132
Lee County	3,587	39.67%	4,048	44.77%	1,406	15.55%			-461	-5.10%	9,041
Loudoun County	2,626	37.22%	1,888	26.76%	2,542	36.03%			84	1.19%	7,056
Louisa County	1,544	46.38%	394	11.84%	1,391	41.78%			153	4.60%	3,329
Lunenburg County	1,377	52.52%	236	9.00%	1,001	38.18%	8	0.31%	376	14.34%	2,622
Madison County	745	39.61%	397	21.11%	739	39.29%			6	0.32%	1,881
Mathews County	668	30.42%	523	23.82%	1,005	45.77%			-337	-15.35%	2,196
Mecklenburg County	3,347	55.86%	546	9.11%	2,099	35.03%			1,248	20.83%	5,992
Middlesex County	896	44.73%	296	14.78%	811	40.49%			85	4.24%	2,003
Montgomery County	2,799	31.29%	2,874	32.13%	3,273	36.59%			-399	-4.46%	8,946
Nelson County	1,638	47.85%	435	12.71%	1,350	39.44%			288	8.41%	3,423
New Kent County	549	35.15%	204	13.06%	809	51.79%			-260	-16.65%	1,562
Northampton County	1,142	39.23%	370	12.71%	1,399	48.06%			-257	-8.83%	2,911
Northumberland County	1,044	38.54%	402	14.84%	1,263	46.62%			-219	-8.08%	2,709
Nottoway County	1,744	51.80%	268	7.96%	1,355	40.24%			389	11.55%	3,367
Orange County	1,268	46.31%	494	18.04%	976	35.65%			292	10.66%	2,738
Page County	2,134	32.89%	2,251	34.69%	2,104	32.42%			-117	-1.80%	6,489
Patrick County	1,422	38.60%	1,159	31.46%	1,103	29.94%			263	7.14%	3,684
Pittsylvania County	4,377	41.61%	1,711	16.26%	4,421	42.02%	11	0.10%	-44	-0.42%	10,520
Powhatan County	954	40.77%	255	10.90%	1,131	48.33%			-177	-7.56%	2,340
Prince Edward County	2,021	50.54%	341	8.53%	1,636	40.91%	1	0.03%	385	9.63%	3,999
Prince George County	1,257	39.45%	339	10.64%	1,589	49.87%	1	0.03%	-332	-10.42%	3,186
Prince William County	3,213	25.68%	3,785	30.26%	5,512	44.06%			-1,727	-13.80%	12,510
Pulaski County	2,379	32.72%	2,020	27.78%	2,872	39.50%			-493	-6.78%	7,271
Rappahannock County	682	44.52%	253	16.51%	597	38.97%			85	5.55%	1,532
Richmond County	744	42.42%	338	19.27%	672	38.31%			72	4.10%	1,754
Roanoke County	4,870	33.95%	4,480	31.23%	4,994	34.82%			-124	-0.86%	14,344
Rockbridge County	1,215	40.98%	754	25.43%	996	33.59%			219	7.39%	2,965
Rockingham County	3,184	33.54%	3,382	35.63%	2,927	30.83%			-198	-2.09%	9,493
Russell County	3,954	44.54%	3,373	37.99%	1,551	17.47%			581	6.54%	8,878
Scott County	2,655	38.66%	2,903	42.27%	1,309	19.06%			-248	-3.61%	6,867
Shenandoah County	2,136	27.87%	3,710	48.40%	1,819	23.73%			-1,574	-20.53%	7,665
Smyth County	2,419	37.50%	2,053	31.82%	1,979	30.68%			366	5.67%	6,451
Southampton County	1,786	47.09%	348	9.17%	1,657	43.69%	2	0.05%	129	3.40%	3,793
Spotsylvania County	901	19.63%	585	12.74%	3,105	67.63%			-2,204	-48.01%	4,591
Stafford County	1,166	18.45%	994	15.73%	4,161	65.83%			-2,995	-47.38%	6,321
Surry County	727	33.66%	149	6.90%	1,284	59.44%			-557	-25.79%	2,160
Sussex County	1,483	37.73%	313	7.96%	2,135	54.31%			-652	-16.59%	3,931
Tazewell County	3,146	38.51%	2,171	26.58%	2,852	34.91%			294	3.60%	8,169
Warren County	1,668	35.29%	1,031	21.81%	2,028	42.90%			-360	-7.62%	4,727
Washington County	3,504	42.43%	2,806	33.98%	1,948	23.59%			698	8.45%	8,258
Westmoreland County	709	36.14%	360	18.35%	893	45.51%			-184	-9.38%	1,962
Wise County	6,372	48.15%	4,409	33.32%	2,452	18.53%			1,963	14.83%	13,233
Wythe County	1,994	39.82%	1,855	37.04%	1,159	23.14%			139	2.78%	5,008
York County	1,881	29.94%	1,216	19.36%	3,185	50.70%			-1,304	-20.76%	6,282
Alexandria City	3,574	26.91%	4,572	34.43%	5,134	38.66%	1	0.01%	-562	-4.23%	13,281
Bedford City	705	51.24%	283	20.57%	388	28.20%			317	23.04%	1,376
Bristol City	1,205	60.95%	471	23.82%	301	15.23%			734	37.13%	1,977
Buena Vista City	506	62.78%	106	13.15%	194	24.07%			312	38.71%	806
Charlottesville City	2,971	35.73%	1,641	19.74%	3,703	44.53%			-732	-8.80%	8,315
Chesapeake City	3,988	26.72%	1,894	12.69%	9,041	60.58%			-5,053	-33.86%	14,923
Clifton Forge City	1,311	78.36%	75	4.48%	287	17.15%			1,024	61.21%	1,673
Colonial Heights City	1,911	54.91%	535	15.37%	1,034	29.71%			877	25.20%	3,480
Covington City	2,165	59.28%	372	10.19%	1,115	30.53%			1,050	28.75%	3,652
Danville City	2,422	37.86%	1,750	27.35%	2,218	34.67%	8	0.13%	204	3.19%	6,398
Emporia City	721	48.82%	138	9.34%	618	41.84%			103	6.97%	1,477
Fairfax City	527	18.58%	1,094	38.58%	1,215	42.84%			-121	-4.27%	2,836
Falls Church City	484	22.93%	732	34.68%	895	42.40%			-163	-7.72%	2,111
Franklin City	563	42.43%	172	12.96%	591	44.54%	1	0.08%	-28	-2.11%	1,327
Fredericksburg City	835	28.79%	501	17.28%	1,564	53.93%			-729	-25.14%	2,900
Galax City	722	46.28%	571	36.60%	267	17.12%			151	9.68%	1,560
Hampton City	4,698	29.28%	2,554	15.92%	8,794	54.80%	1	0.01%	-4,096	-25.53%	16,047
Harrisonburg City	1,278	40.05%	1,130	35.41%	783	24.54%			148	4.64%	3,191
Hopewell City	2,014	45.48%	661	14.93%	1,753	39.59%			261	5.89%	4,428
Lexington City	687	45.32%	347	22.89%	482	31.79%			205	13.52%	1,516
Lynchburg City	4,626	47.29%	2,409	24.63%	2,747	28.08%			1,879	19.21%	9,782
Martinsville City	1,490	41.23%	772	21.36%	1,352	37.41%			138	3.82%	3,614
Newport News City	7,138	33.43%	3,519	16.48%	10,698	50.10%			-3,560	-16.67%	21,355
Norfolk City	10,156	25.04%	6,419	15.83%	23,978	59.12%	4	0.01%	-13,822	-34.08%	40,557
Norton City	677	53.56%	350	27.69%	237	18.75%			327	25.87%	1,264
Petersburg City	2,976	38.19%	491	6.30%	4,308	55.28%	18	0.23%	-1,332	-17.09%	7,793
Portsmouth City	5,524	25.49%	2,517	11.61%	13,633	62.90%			-8,109	-37.41%	21,674
Radford City	879	32.28%	1,046	38.41%	798	29.31%			-167	-6.13%	2,723
Richmond City	21,850	45.55%	4,634	9.66%	21,484	44.78%	4	0.01%	366	0.76%	47,972
Roanoke City	5,612	35.10%	4,219	26.39%	6,153	38.49%	3	0.02%	-541	-3.38%	15,987
Salem City	1,502	35.60%	1,199	28.42%	1,518	35.98%			-16	-0.38%	4,219
South Boston City	870	53.21%	209	12.78%	556	34.01%			314	19.20%	1,635
Staunton City	2,239	44.03%	1,651	32.47%	1,195	23.50%			588	11.56%	5,085
Suffolk City	981	50.00%	246	12.54%	735	37.46%			246	12.54%	1,962
Virginia Beach City	7,732	31.09%	5,209	20.95%	11,926	47.96%			-4,194	-16.87%	24,867
Waynesboro City	1,210	34.33%	1,509	42.81%	806	22.87%			-299	-8.48%	3,525
Williamsburg City	679	42.44%	295	18.44%	626	39.13%			53	3.31%	1,600
Winchester City	1,568	42.26%	1,026	27.65%	1,116	30.08%			452	12.18%	3,710
Totals	334,580	36.89%	209,861	23.14%	362,371	39.96%	81	0.01%	-27,791	-3.06%	906,893
