= Charlotte Giesen =

American politician (1907–1995)

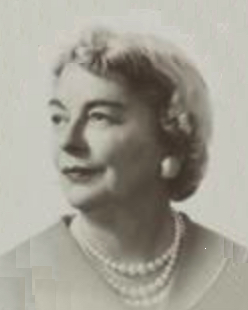

Member of the Virginia House of Delegates for Montgomery and Radford City
- In office January 8, 1958 – January 9, 1962
- Preceded by: John L. Whitehead
- Succeeded by: Kenneth I. Devore

Personal details
- Born: Charlotte Milton Caldwell; January 27, 1907 Radford, Virginia, U.S.
- Died: January 28, 1995 (aged 88) Radford, Virginia, U.S.
- Party: Republican
- Spouse: Arthur R. Giesen
- Children: Arthur R. Giesen, Jr. ("Pete"), Ann Giesen Fowlkes
- Education: Radford College

Charlotte Milton Caldwell Giesen (January 27, 1907 – January 28, 1995) (nicknamed "Pinkie") was a Virginia politician and news editor. A lifelong resident of Radford, Virginia, she served in the Virginia House of Delegates from 1958 to 1961, becoming the first Republican woman elected to the House.

== Life and career ==
Charlotte Milton Caldwell was born to Charles Minor Caldwell and his wife the former Ida Goodykoontz in Radford, Virginia. She graduated from Radford College, then known as the Women's Division of Virginia Polytechnic Institute, in 1925. On April 5, 1929, she married Arthur Rossa Giesen, and they had a son and daughter who survived them.

In 1954 Charlotte Giesen became the first woman elected to Radford's city council. Her husband, Arthur Giesen, was Radford's mayor and also served on the city council. Charlotte Giesen was for many years the women's page editor of the Radford News Journal and also edited the original Montgomery News Messenger. She served on the board of directors of both the Radford Child Care Center and the Radford chapter of the American Red Cross. She was also active in her Lutheran Church, the American Legion auxiliary and the local chapter of the American Farm Bureau.

During the Massive Resistance crisis, voters elected Giesen in 1957 to the House of Delegates (a part-time position). She defeated incumbent Democrat John L. Whitehead, a member of the Byrd Organization who supported closing public schools to prevent racial integration. Giesen represented Radford and the surrounding Montgomery County, and won re-election in 1959. Her platform, considered progressive for the day, included reinstating compulsory education, requiring polio vaccinations and the jailing of drunk drivers, and support for open government.

Fellow delegate, Democrat Dorothy Shoemaker McDiarmid, characterized Giesen as "everyone's favorite aunt." Giesen served on four committees: Federal Relations, Immigration, Printing, and Public Property. In 1961 Giesen was defeated for reelection by Democrat Kenneth I. Devore, as schools had reopened, but many whites supported private segregation academies. Devore likewise served two terms, and received more prestigious committee assignments (to General Laws, Roads, and House Expenses).

Nonetheless, Charlotte Giesen continued her civic involvement. In 1962 she was reelected to the Radford City Council, on which she served until 1966. Giesen also served on the Board of Visitors of her alma mater from 1970 until 1978. Moreover, her son, Pete Giesen, who had become President of Augusta Steel Corporation, continued the family's Republican political tradition in 1963 by winning election to the Virginia House of Delegates from Augusta County and the cities of Staunton and Waynesboro. Although Augusta Steel closed, and he lost his initial campaign in 1961 and a re-election bid during the post-Watergate Democratic landslide, Pete Giesen represented those cities and parts of Augusta County as well as all or parts of Bath, Highland and Rockingham Counties for more than three decades of elected public service (1964-1996).

Theodore Roosevelt Dalton and his son, future governor John N. Dalton, were Giesen's next-door neighbors during her time as a delegate.

== Death and legacy ==
Widowed, Giesen died at her home in Radford on January 28, 1995. She was buried in that city's West View Cemetery.

During her lifetime, Giesen was voted Radford Woman of the Year by the Business and Professional Women's Association, and in 1960 the local chapter of the Veterans of Foreign Wars elected her Outstanding Woman of the Year. Her family established a scholarship to honor her and her husband at Radford. The House of Delegates and State Senate jointly memorialized her. The Virginia Tech library, special collections division, has her papers, including a taped interview.
