= Robert Young Button =

American lawyer (1899–1977)

30th Attorney General of Virginia
- In office January 13, 1962 – January 17, 1970
- Governor: Albertis Harrison; Mills Godwin
- Preceded by: Frederick Thomas Gray
- Succeeded by: Andrew Pickens Miller

Member of the Virginia Senate from the 27th district
- In office January 9, 1946 – January 10, 1962
- Preceded by: Thomas B. Glascock
- Succeeded by: John Alexander

Personal details
- Born: Robert Young Button; November 2, 1899 Culpeper, Virginia, U.S.
- Died: September 1, 1977 (aged 77) Culpeper, Virginia, U.S.
- Spouse: Kathleen Mary Antoinette Cheape
- Children: 2
- Education: University of Virginia

Robert Young Button (November 2, 1899 – September 1, 1977) served two terms as Attorney General of Virginia, as well as a fifteen years as Virginia State Senator. Button rose through the ranks of the Byrd Organization and became one of its leading members as it ultimately crumbled as a result of the Massive Resistance crisis.

== Early and family life ==
Born on November 2, 1899, in Culpeper County, Virginia, to John Young Button (farmer and traveling hardware salesman), and his wife the former Margaret Agnes Duncan, Button attended the local public schools and graduated from Culpeper High School in 1917. He then attended the University of Virginia for five years and received an undergraduate and law (LL.B.) degree in 1922. He was a member of the prestigious Raven Society and Order of the Coif. On August 20, 1931, Button married nurse Kathleen Mary Antoinette Cheape (1907–2007), who converted him to the Episcopal Church, and they had a son and a daughter.

== Career ==
Button became a member of the Virginia Bar in 1922 and practiced law for a decade before beginning his public career. During this initial time he first became active in his community and the Shenandoah Valley through the Rotary Club and other organizations. A member of the American Bar Association, Button later became a Fellow of the American College of Trial Lawyers and American Judicature Society.

The 1933 election campaign began Button's politically activity within the Byrd Organization. He successively served on the newly formed Probation and Parole Agency (1942 to 1945 when it was merged into the newly created Virginia Department of Corrections), Virginia State Board of Education (1945 to 1960) and Potomac River Commission (1958). During the 1950s Button also served as a trustee of the Jamestown Corporation with David J. Mays and others.

In 1945 Button won election to the Senate of Virginia from the 27th district, which then included parts of Culpeper, Fauquier, and Loudoun counties. His increasingly important legislative assignments included appointments to the Committees on Finance, on General Laws, and on Privileges and Elections. In 1956 Button chaired the Committee on Welfare. During his fifteen years in the Senate, Button became associated with the organization's most conservative wing: backing fiscal conservatism and ultimately Massive Resistance (which originated to thwart the racial integration provisions of Brown v. Board of Education which the U.S. Supreme Court decided in 1954 and 1955). As Senator Byrd and newspaperman James J. Kilpatrick became increasingly determined to support segregation, Button attended meetings to support that wing of the party. The initial important meeting included about 30 state senators and other politicians and was held at a Petersburg, Virginia firehouse in the district of State Senator Garland Gray. Button later served on the Gray Commission (a/k/a Commission on Public Education of 1954) and the Perrow Commission (a/k/a Commission on Public Education of 1959).

In the 1961 Democratic primary, the Byrd organization ran a slate to oppose Governor J. Lindsay Almond and his "Young Turks," who had complied with court desegregation orders after the decisions of the Virginia Supreme Court and three judge panel of federal district judges on January 19, 1959 (Robert E. Lee's birthday). The conservative slate ultimately elected included Button as attorney general, on a ticket with former attorney general Albertis Sydney Harrison for governor (Harrison resigning his position in order to run and being replaced by Frederick Thomas Gray until Button's election) and his close friend Mills E. Godwin Jr. as Lieutenant Governor.

During his two terms as attorney general (he was reelected in 1965 as Godwin won the governorship), Button defended racial segregation and criticized the U.S. Supreme Court as too liberal. He attacked the Voting Rights Act of 1965 as unconstitutional. His assistants lost judicial cases including NAACP v. Button (1963), Griffin v. County School Board of Prince Edward County (1964) and Loving v. Virginia (1967).

A heart attack Button suffered in 1967 may have convinced him not to seek re-election in 1969, but instead return to his private law practice in Culpeper.

== Death and legacy ==
Button ultimately died of a heart attack in 1977, and is buried at the city's Masonic Cemetery.

Legal offices
| Preceded by Frederick Thomas Gray | Attorney General of Virginia; 1962–1970 | Succeeded by Andrew Pickens Miller |
