= DeVore & Sons =

DeVore & Sons Inc. Bible Publishers, is a specialist publisher of Catholic and Protestant Bibles.

The company was started in 1948 by Floyd DeVore, when he purchased the Chicago-based Bible publisher John A Hertel. In 1968, DeVore relocated to Wichita where it has been located ever since. The company is a family owned business, now run by Ross DeVore. Ross DeVore is the fourth generation of the DeVore family to lead the company.

The company publishes and markets Bibles using two brands: Heirloom Bible Publishers and Fireside Catholic Publishing.

Its customers are primarily institutional, such as Catholic churches, schools, fraternal lodges and labor unions.

"Catholic churches and schools account for a large part of the company's business" DeVore says.

== Divisions ==
Fireside Publishing: A publisher of Catholic New American Bibles and Douay Rheims Bibles

Heirloom Bible Publishers: Publisher of King James Version, Douay Rheims, New American Bible version Bibles.

== Fireside Publishing ==
In 1970 Fireside was one of the original licensees of the New American Bible Catholic text, which has become the most widely used Catholic Bible in the USA. Fireside was officially the first publisher of the NAB edition, as it was a Fireside New American Bible that was first off the press in 1970.

Since starting to publish the New American Bible in 1970, Fireside has become one of the leading publishers of English Catholic Family Bibles in the US, selling to Catholic parishes and schools. "Catholic churches and schools account for a large part of the company's business" DeVore says.

They also publish a range of Douay-Rheims Bibles for traditional Catholics and Sagrada Bibles for Spanish speakers.

In 2004, Fireside announced that it would launch the Fireside Catholic Youth Bible. A leading competitor, Saint Mary's Press, had published a Catholic Youth Bible since 1999, and this title accounted for a third of its sales when Fireside launched its own version. Saint Mary's Press unsuccessfully sued Fireside Publishing for trademark infringement action, allowing Fireside to continue to publish the Fireside Catholic Youth Bible.

== Heirloom Bibles ==
Heirloom publishes a variety of Catholic and Protestant Bibles, in Family Bible editions (large presentation formats).

The Catholic range of Bibles includes the New American Bible, Douay Rheims and Sagrada translations, while the Protestant Bibles use the KJV translation.
