= Nicholas DeVore III =

Nicholas DeVore III (April 24, 1949 – May 16, 2003) was a freelance photographer in the 1970s, 1980s and early 1990s who spent 25 years traveling the world taking photos for publications such as National Geographic, Fortune, Life, and GEO.

== Life ==
While DeVore was acknowledged as an excellent technical photographer of the outdoors, it was the way he embraced cultures and provoked people that made his work stand out. His focus on international destinations – landscapes, people and culture – continues to draw admirers and followers. A signature expression of his style, subject matter and viewpoint remains Village Japan: the Four Seasons of Shimukappu, an album that took almost two years to make, photographed in Shimukappu, Hokkaido. It is the only existing published collection of DeVore's photography to date.

In an Aspen Times article DeVore summed up what would be his guiding philosophy for life. "I feel like a humanitarian ... turning on all those people to how I feel about places and people. Introducing my friends to my other friends."

His work exploited vivid color and advanced in-camera techniques such as double and triple exposures. His style sometimes countered traditional travel and adventure photography standards as he promoted impressionistic images created by “huffing” or fogging the camera lens with his breath and using natural settings such as water, rain, condensation, glass, etc. to frame and artfully distort the picture.

DeVore was born in Paris, France, the son of U.S. Air Force Maj. Nicholas DeVore II and British-born Sheila Barry DeVore. He was brought up in Europe and Aspen, where he developed his love for the mountains. His grandfather was Nicholas DeVore I, author and professor who pioneered the academic study of astrology.

A charismatic student, DeVore graduated as class president from Aspen High School, where he played hockey and ski jumped for the Aspen Ski Club. He graduated from Outward Bound and the National Outdoor Leadership School, and worked as a wilderness ranger, soloing for days in the backcountry.

DeVore didn't get his first camera until he was 19. An avid hunter and marksman, he had a natural eye that transitioned from gun sites to camera lens. After studying briefly at Colorado Mountain College and Aspen's Center of the Eye, Nicholas practiced his outdoor photography while working for the Forest Service.

In 1972 DeVore caught the attention of Robert Gilka, the photo director of National Geographic, with an amateur portfolio shot in the Galapagos Islands. DeVore leapt from an Aspen chair lift to retrieve the editor's dropped camera, and landed a career start as the Geographic’s youngest contributor. Physical and technical prowess proved him a go-to for arduous assignments: South Pacific canoeing with celestial navigators, Polynesian rafting from Hawaii to Tahiti, Arctic dog sledding, trekking Mt. Everest with Sir Edmund Hillary.

Within months, Gilka commissioned DeVore to the Wind River Range in Wyoming’s Bitterroot-Wind River National Wilderness to cover the National Outdoor Leadership School. DeVore had to accomplish technical climbs and frame shots high atop rock faces.

An inveterate traveler, DeVore crisscrossed the globe. A thirst for adventure, even while working, led to exploits such as entering the private world of geisha training in Kyoto, Japan, wind surfing in the Sahara, being shipwrecked in the Sea of Cortez, flying in illegal airspace in the Himalayas, scaling New York landmarks such as the Brooklyn Bridge and Chrysler Building, and perilously descending a Colorado Fourteener during a surprise blizzard.

Sam Abell, a staff photographer at National Geographic for 33 years, said DeVore was the most charismatic and flamboyant character he ever came across. "Even though the name ‘adventure travel’ didn't exist then, he would have been its primary photographer."

== Photography career ==
Early freelance assignments outside National Geographic included:

- World Figure Skating Championships for ABC Television in January, 1975.
- Photo essay on Idaho for the United States Department of Agriculture Bicentennial Book Project, March to April, 1975.
- The United States Information Agency Border Project, which included a gallery of scenes from the Canadian and Mexican borders, December 1975.

In 1975, DeVore opened his first professional business, Sunshine Photography, with his long-time friend and photographic colleague, Jonathan Wright. Photographers David Hiser and Paul Chesley, also freelancers for National Geographic, joined them to launch Photographers/Aspen in 1984.

One of DeVore's passionate personal projects spanned a decade. He created an ongoing series about Colorado cowboy Pat Mantle. Annually, DeVore would travel to shoot Mantle driving his herd of hundreds of horses across northern Colorado. In the early 1980s, he shot the Royal Easter Show in Sydney. Another independent project documented the first organized mountain bike tour through Southern India. Taken during January 1990, the tour was sponsored by India's tourism industry and Aspen's InnerAsia Expeditions International.

DeVore was a frequent lecturer and fellow of the Explorers Club, a member of the Society for Photographic Education, the International Advisory Board of Friends of Africa, the board of trustees for the Aspen Art Museum, and the director of Galerie Foto Arte. He also taught at Anderson Ranch in Snowmass Village, Maine Photographic and Telluride's Autumn Eye workshops. He lived the remainder of his life in Bisbee Arizona from 1995 until his untimely death in 2003 with his muse, Maria (Margarete) Izabel Bedini Correa de Sa, a model from Brazil; she was with him from 1996 to 2002.

== National Geographic and Traveler, articles and books ==
- Wind, Wave, Star, and Bird, National Geographic Magazine, 1974 Dec.
- Trek Across Arctic America, National Geographic Magazine, 1974 Mar.
- [Hokule'a] Follows the Stars to Tahiti, National Geographic Magazine, 1976 Oct.
- Should They Build a Fence Around Montana? National Geographic Magazine, 1976 May
- Brazil's Golden Beachhead, National Geographic Magazine, 1978 Feb.
- Along the Great Divide, National Geographic Magazine, 1979 Oct.
- Park at the Top of the World, National Geographic Magazine, 1982 June
- Blue Horizons: Paradise Isles of the Pacific, National Geographic Book, 1985
- Wild and Windswept: Channel Islands National Park, Traveler magazine, 1985 Spring
- Majestic Island Worlds, National Geographic Book, 1987
- Tahiti's Soft Caress, Traveler magazine, 1987/88 Winter
- Excursion to Enchantment: A Journey to the World's Most Beautiful Places, National Geographic Book, 1988
- New England: Land of Scenic Splendor, National Geographic Book, 1989
- Time Out in Telluride, Traveler magazine, 1990 Sept./Oct.
- Bali: Island of Deities and Dance, Traveler magazine, 1990 Mar./Apr.

== Photographic art and gallery work ==
In addition to increasing his catalog of editorial and commercial photography, DeVore branched into photographic art. The first photographic art exhibit of his personal pictures took place at Aspen's Patricia Moore Gallery in February 1980.

Along with Michael A. Smith and Dr. David Heiden, DeVore contributed photos to an exhibition promoting international social awareness in 1983 at the Joanne Lyon Gallery. Included on the opening reception invitation was his Women on the Beach, an impressionistic photo of women in colorful, local dress, standing on a white sandy beach at the water's edge. Completely created in-camera, the print is awash in pastels and muted blues and yellows and reddish oranges.

In 1985, DeVore opened [name] Photo Art Gallery next door to Photographers Aspen and showcased fine art from other Geographic photographers and his own growing artistic and abstract body of work. He acquired portfolios from other well-known artists such Ernst Haas, a friend and strong influence.

In the late 80s the David Floria Gallery also hosted an exhibition of 16 of DeVore's most memorable images from National Geographic, Life, Time, Paris Match, Stern, Fortune, and American Photographer. His work also displayed in New York, Los Angeles, London, Milan, and Tokyo, and today is found in a number of private collections and public places. Trade journals ran features on DeVore and his work, including his artistic diversions, such as Darkroom Photography’s lengthy interview in the February 1990 issue.

== Death ==
DeVore was 54 when he died of a self-inflicted gunshot wound on Friday, May 16, 2003. He had two children, Nicholas and Katrina, with his wife Karinjo. Devore had struggled with depression and alcoholism.
