= Verilite Sunbird =

Model 100 Sunbird

General information
- Type: Utility aircraft
- National origin: United States
- Manufacturer: Verilite
- Number built: 1

History
- First flight: 5 October 1987

The Verilite Model 100 Sunbird was a low-cost light aircraft developed in the United States in the 1980s. It was developed by De Vore Aviation, a company that manufactures aircraft components, as a first foray into aircraft manufacturing. When initiated in 1983, the goal of the project was to create a two-seat light aircraft that could be sold for less than $US 20,000. Additionally, it was hoped that the Sunbird operating costs would be half that of a conventional two-seat aircraft. Funding for the project became available in 1985, and the Verilite subsidiary was created to develop the concept. The design was unconventional: a high-wing, strut-braced monoplane with the single engine fitted in pusher configuration at the rear of the wing, and the empennage carried on an aluminum boom. The pilot and a single passenger sat side by side in a fully enclosed cockpit, and fixed, tricycle undercarriage was fitted. Originally simply dubbed the "Affordable Airplane", the name "Sundancer" was chosen as the winner of a public competition, and later changed to "Sunbird".

Verilite worked together with NASA's Dryden Flight Research Center to correct a serious flaw in the design when tests with a radio-controlled model saw the aircraft enter a spin following a stall. Adding droops to the outboard halves of the leading edges eliminated the problem and rendered the Sunbird "unspinnable".

The first flight was originally anticipated in May 1986 and type certification by mid 1987. However, taxiing trials did not commence until February 1987 and the first attempt to fly the aircraft, on 18 April, resulted in a crash immediately after take-off. The NTSB report on the accident noted that the aircraft was unable to maintain altitude after leaving ground effect, and that although the engine was rated at 60 hp, it could only deliver 40 hp.

The aircraft was rebuilt, in the process losing 150 lb (68 kg) of structural weight, and the engine was modified to deliver 70 hp. In this form, the Sunbird flew successfully on 5 October 1987. The projected cost of the aircraft had increased to $22,000 by 1985 and to $24,000 by 1987. Certification was now expected by mid-1989. Financing the project had proved difficult, however, with Gilbert De Vore personally contributing 75% of the $1 million spent on the project by the end of 1986. De Vore had plans to make a public offering to raise between $1 million and $25 million to fund the rest of the development and certification program, and would need further finance to establish production. Ultimately, however, development was cancelled, and no further Sunbirds were built.

== Specifications ==
Data from Jane's All the World's Aircraft 1987–88, p. 529

General characteristics

- Crew: One pilot
- Capacity: 1 passenger
- Length: 23 ft 8 in (7.21 m)
- Wingspan: 32 ft 0 in (9.75 m)
- Height: 8 ft 4 in (2.54 m)
- Wing area: 135 sq ft (12.6 m^{2})
- Empty weight: 760 lb (345 kg)
- Gross weight: 1,250 lb (567 kg)
- Powerplant: 1 × Emdair CF-092B , 70 hp (52 kW)

Performance

- Maximum speed: 128 mph (206 km/h, 111 kn)
- Range: 460 mi (740 km, 400 nmi)
- Rate of climb: 670 ft/min (3.4 m/s)
