= Kenneth I. Devore =

American lawyer and politician

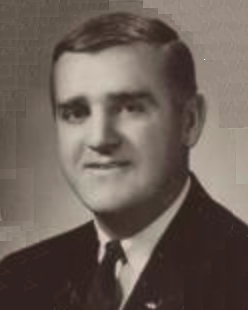

Member of the Virginia House of Delegates for Montgomery and Radford City
- In office January 10, 1962 – January 12, 1966
- Preceded by: Charlotte Giesen
- Succeeded by: John N. Dalton

Personal details
- Born: Kenneth Irvin Devore; August 3, 1927 Roanoke, Virginia, U.S.
- Died: August 13, 1997 (aged 70) Radford, Virginia, U.S.
- Party: Democratic
- Spouse: Lina Christenberry
- Education: Emory and Henry College; University of Richmond

Military service
- Allegiance: United States
- Branch/service: United States Marine Corps

Kenneth Irvin Devore (August 3, 1927 – August 13, 1997) was an American lawyer and politician. He represented it and Montgomery County and Radford in the Virginia House of Delegates for two terms before being nominated to serve as a judge of Virginia's 27th Circuit Court.

Virginia House of Delegates
Preceded by Charlotte Giesen	Virginia Delegate for Montgomery and Radford City; 1962–1966	Succeeded by John N. Dalton
