= 1977 Virginia gubernatorial election =

- November 8, 1977
- Turnout: 62.7% (voting eligible)
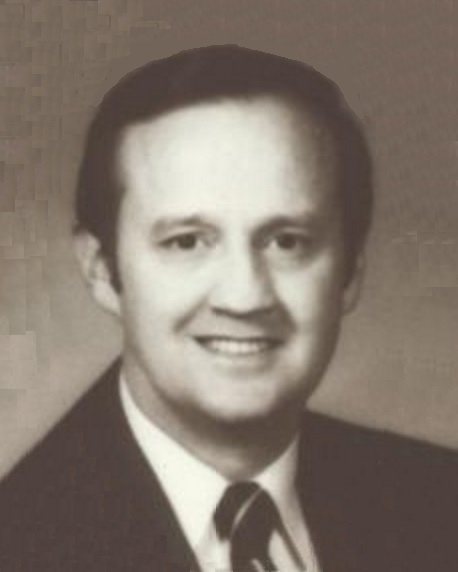

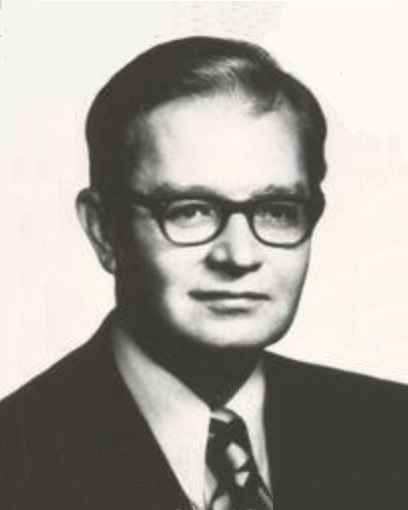
Nominee	John N. Dalton	Henry Howell
Party	Republican	Democratic
Popular vote	699,302	541,319
Percentage	55.90%	43.27%
- County and independent city results Dalton: 40–50% 50–60% 60–70% 70–80% Howell: 40–50% 50–60% 60–70% 70–80%
Governor before election
Mills E. Godwin, Jr.
Republican
Elected Governor
John N. Dalton
Republican

In the 1977 Virginia gubernatorial election, incumbent Governor Mills E. Godwin, Jr., a Republican, was unable to seek re-election due to term limits. John N. Dalton, the Lieutenant Governor of Virginia, was nominated by the Republican Party to run against the Democratic nominee, former Lieutenant Governor of Virginia Henry Howell.

This was the only instance in Virginia's history in which the Republican Party won the gubernatorial election for a third time consecutively. It is also the last time when Arlington County and the independent cities of Charlottesville, Falls Church, Richmond, Roanoke and Williamsburg voted Republican for Governor.

== Primaries ==
=== Democratic ===
- Henry Howell, former Lieutenant Governor of Virginia and candidate in 1969 and 1973
- Andrew P. Miller, Attorney General of Virginia

Henry Howell, who was elected lieutenant governor in 1971 and unsuccessful ran for governor in 1973, was an opponent of the Byrd machine and one of the most liberal politicians in Virginia at the time. Attorney General Andrew P. Miller was the highest elected Democratic official in the state. Miller's father, Francis Pickens Miller, ran as an anti-Byrd candidate in the 1949 gubernatorial election.

14.4% of the voting age population participated in the Democratic primary.

=== Republican ===
Governor Mills Godwin, a former Democrat, was supported by the Byrd machine, but John N. Dalton was a lifelong Republican and his father, Theodore Roosevelt Dalton, ran as the Republican nominee against a Byrd-backed Democrat in the 1953 and 1957 gubernatorial elections.

== Results ==
1977 Virginia gubernatorial election
Party	Candidate	Votes	%	±%
Republican	John N. Dalton	699,302	55.90%	+5.19%
Democratic	Henry Howell	541,319	43.27%	−5.99%
Independent	Alan Ogden	10,101	0.81%	
Write-ins		218	0.02%	
Majority		157,983	12.63%	+11.18%
Turnout		1,250,940		
Republican hold		Swing		

=== Results by county or independent city ===
1977 Virginia gubernatorial election by county or independent city
	John Nichols Dalton Republican		Henry Evans Howell Democratic		Alan R. Ogden Independent		Various candidates Write-ins		Margin		Total votes cast
	#	%	#	%	#	%	#	%	#	%	Total votes cast
Accomack County	4,701	55.01%	3,769	44.11%	75	0.88%			932	10.91%	8,545
Albemarle County	7,392	57.75%	5,319	41.55%	85	0.66%	4	0.03%	2,073	16.20%	12,800
Alleghany County	1,709	47.28%	1,884	52.12%	22	0.61%			-175	-4.84%	3,615
Amelia County	1,618	58.01%	1,139	40.84%	32	1.15%			479	17.17%	2,789
Amherst County	3,737	61.70%	2,252	37.18%	68	1.12%			1,485	24.52%	6,057
Appomattox County	2,109	64.20%	1,162	35.37%	14	0.43%			947	28.83%	3,285
Arlington County	21,589	52.13%	19,495	47.08%	282	0.68%	46	0.11%	2,094	5.06%	41,412
Augusta County	7,721	66.29%	3,858	33.12%	68	0.58%			3,863	33.17%	11,647
Bath County	746	52.68%	663	46.82%	5	0.35%	2	0.14%	83	5.86%	1,416
Bedford County	4,230	59.73%	2,826	39.90%	26	0.37%			1,404	19.82%	7,082
Bland County	966	59.01%	659	40.26%	8	0.49%	4	0.24%	307	18.75%	1,637
Botetourt County	3,294	55.93%	2,554	43.36%	42	0.71%			740	12.56%	5,890
Brunswick County	2,317	52.09%	1,991	44.76%	140	3.15%			326	7.33%	4,448
Buchanan County	2,977	41.90%	4,065	57.21%	63	0.89%			-1,088	-15.31%	7,105
Buckingham County	1,555	50.63%	1,470	47.87%	46	1.50%			85	2.77%	3,071
Campbell County	6,644	73.37%	2,361	26.07%	48	0.53%	3	0.03%	4,283	47.29%	9,056
Caroline County	1,534	41.16%	2,102	56.40%	91	2.44%			-568	-15.24%	3,727
Carroll County	4,152	63.91%	2,275	35.02%	70	1.08%			1,877	28.89%	6,497
Charles City County	384	26.39%	1,038	71.34%	33	2.27%			-654	-44.95%	1,455
Charlotte County	1,989	57.87%	1,428	41.55%	20	0.58%			561	16.32%	3,437
Chesterfield County	24,371	73.23%	8,762	26.33%	143	0.43%	5	0.02%	15,609	46.90%	33,281
Clarke County	1,399	65.50%	716	33.52%	20	0.94%	1	0.05%	683	31.98%	2,136
Craig County	550	41.98%	747	57.02%	8	0.61%	5	0.38%	-197	-15.04%	1,310
Culpeper County	3,588	61.33%	2,227	38.07%	34	0.58%	1	0.02%	1,361	23.26%	5,850
Cumberland County	1,270	56.70%	956	42.68%	14	0.63%			314	14.02%	2,240
Dickenson County	2,502	42.36%	3,326	56.32%	78	1.32%			-824	-13.95%	5,906
Dinwiddie County	2,345	47.29%	2,501	50.43%	112	2.26%	1	0.02%	-156	-3.15%	4,959
Essex County	1,375	64.40%	726	34.00%	34	1.59%			649	30.40%	2,135
Fairfax County	75,216	58.86%	51,754	40.50%	790	0.62%	30	0.02%	23,462	18.36%	127,790
Fauquier County	3,716	58.88%	2,568	40.69%	26	0.41%	1	0.02%	1,148	18.19%	6,311
Floyd County	1,861	66.35%	905	32.26%	39	1.39%			956	34.08%	2,805
Fluvanna County	1,135	53.31%	949	44.57%	45	2.11%			186	8.74%	2,129
Franklin County	3,642	48.06%	3,872	51.10%	64	0.84%			-230	-3.04%	7,578
Frederick County	3,771	62.60%	2,202	36.55%	50	0.83%	1	0.02%	1,569	26.05%	6,024
Giles County	2,620	49.89%	2,588	49.28%	44	0.84%			32	0.61%	5,252
Gloucester County	2,988	54.06%	2,502	45.27%	34	0.62%	3	0.05%	486	8.79%	5,527
Goochland County	2,003	52.61%	1,716	45.07%	88	2.31%			287	7.54%	3,807
Grayson County	2,317	53.14%	1,967	45.11%	76	1.74%			350	8.03%	4,360
Greene County	872	58.45%	614	41.15%	6	0.40%			258	17.29%	1,492
Greensville County	1,216	40.85%	1,642	55.16%	119	4.00%			-426	-14.31%	2,977
Halifax County	4,177	58.18%	2,959	41.22%	43	0.60%			1,218	16.97%	7,179
Hanover County	10,540	69.98%	4,396	29.19%	123	0.82%	2	0.01%	6,144	40.79%	15,061
Henrico County	41,588	73.98%	14,417	25.65%	203	0.36%	9	0.02%	27,171	48.33%	56,217
Henry County	5,872	52.98%	5,150	46.46%	61	0.55%	1	0.01%	722	6.51%	11,084
Highland County	603	63.41%	339	35.65%	9	0.95%			264	27.76%	951
Isle of Wight County	2,677	46.00%	3,018	51.86%	122	2.10%	2	0.03%	-341	-5.86%	5,819
James City County	2,932	56.02%	2,269	43.35%	32	0.61%	1	0.02%	663	12.67%	5,234
King and Queen County	710	45.43%	807	51.63%	46	2.94%			-97	-6.21%	1,563
King George County	1,047	49.04%	1,051	49.23%	37	1.73%			-4	-0.19%	2,135
King William County	1,432	56.67%	1,006	39.81%	89	3.52%			426	16.86%	2,527
Lancaster County	2,250	62.94%	1,296	36.25%	29	0.81%			954	26.69%	3,575
Lee County	2,962	47.47%	3,125	50.08%	153	2.45%			-163	-2.61%	6,240
Loudoun County	6,668	58.23%	4,689	40.95%	91	0.79%	3	0.03%	1,979	17.28%	11,451
Louisa County	2,163	52.68%	1,856	45.20%	87	2.12%			307	7.48%	4,106
Lunenburg County	1,854	63.00%	1,072	36.43%	17	0.58%			782	26.57%	2,943
Madison County	1,789	57.58%	1,300	41.84%	18	0.58%			489	15.74%	3,107
Mathews County	1,681	62.58%	982	36.56%	23	0.86%			699	26.02%	2,686
Mecklenburg County	4,317	64.81%	2,296	34.47%	48	0.72%			2,021	30.34%	6,661
Middlesex County	1,447	58.80%	1,001	40.67%	11	0.45%	2	0.08%	446	18.12%	2,461
Montgomery County	7,894	64.48%	4,232	34.57%	113	0.92%	3	0.02%	3,662	29.91%	12,242
Nelson County	1,415	45.97%	1,609	52.27%	54	1.75%			-194	-6.30%	3,078
New Kent County	1,114	53.43%	936	44.89%	35	1.68%			178	8.54%	2,085
Northampton County	1,990	52.77%	1,753	46.49%	28	0.74%			237	6.28%	3,771
Northumberland County	2,126	62.68%	1,240	36.56%	26	0.77%			886	26.12%	3,392
Nottoway County	2,750	60.10%	1,797	39.27%	29	0.63%			953	20.83%	4,576
Orange County	2,493	59.91%	1,644	39.51%	24	0.58%			849	20.40%	4,161
Page County	2,785	57.15%	2,025	41.56%	62	1.27%	1	0.02%	760	15.60%	4,873
Patrick County	2,398	57.31%	1,757	41.99%	28	0.67%	1	0.02%	641	15.32%	4,184
Pittsylvania County	8,268	63.28%	4,744	36.31%	54	0.41%			3,524	26.97%	13,066
Powhatan County	1,734	59.61%	1,123	38.60%	52	1.79%			611	21.00%	2,909
Prince Edward County	2,648	60.37%	1,707	38.92%	31	0.71%			941	21.45%	4,386
Prince George County	1,929	52.09%	1,709	46.15%	65	1.76%			220	5.94%	3,703
Prince William County	10,014	53.15%	8,700	46.18%	122	0.65%	5	0.03%	1,314	6.97%	18,841
Pulaski County	4,850	58.49%	3,376	40.71%	65	0.78%	1	0.01%	1,474	17.78%	8,292
Rappahannock County	779	47.44%	849	51.71%	13	0.79%	1	0.06%	-70	-4.26%	1,642
Richmond County	1,398	64.81%	729	33.80%	30	1.39%			669	31.02%	2,157
Roanoke County	12,964	64.67%	6,994	34.89%	87	0.43%	2	0.01%	5,970	29.78%	20,047
Rockbridge County	2,187	53.81%	1,850	45.52%	24	0.59%	3	0.07%	337	8.29%	4,064
Rockingham County	8,785	68.16%	4,035	31.31%	66	0.51%	3	0.02%	4,750	36.85%	12,889
Russell County	3,062	43.56%	3,928	55.87%	40	0.57%			-866	-12.32%	7,030
Scott County	3,018	48.10%	3,228	51.44%	29	0.46%			-210	-3.35%	6,275
Shenandoah County	5,178	68.71%	2,295	30.45%	63	0.84%			2,883	38.26%	7,536
Smyth County	4,201	55.27%	3,363	44.24%	35	0.46%	2	0.03%	838	11.02%	7,601
Southampton County	2,513	50.26%	2,392	47.84%	94	1.88%	1	0.02%	121	2.42%	5,000
Spotsylvania County	2,355	43.19%	3,018	55.35%	80	1.47%			-663	-12.16%	5,453
Stafford County	3,415	45.18%	4,069	53.83%	75	0.99%			-654	-8.65%	7,559
Surry County	945	39.72%	1,388	58.34%	46	1.93%			-443	-18.62%	2,379
Sussex County	1,607	45.76%	1,872	53.30%	33	0.94%			-265	-7.55%	3,512
Tazewell County	4,500	50.09%	4,386	48.82%	97	1.08%	1	0.01%	114	1.27%	8,984
Warren County	2,264	51.72%	2,087	47.68%	26	0.59%			177	4.04%	4,377
Washington County	6,049	59.46%	4,065	39.96%	57	0.56%	2	0.02%	1,984	19.50%	10,173
Westmoreland County	1,940	50.31%	1,878	48.70%	36	0.93%	2	0.05%	62	1.61%	3,856
Wise County	3,785	44.03%	4,756	55.32%	56	0.65%			-971	-11.29%	8,597
Wythe County	4,005	65.83%	2,056	33.79%	23	0.38%			1,949	32.03%	6,084
York County	4,563	55.29%	3,598	43.60%	91	1.10%	1	0.01%	965	11.69%	8,253
Alexandria City	11,417	49.39%	11,536	49.90%	156	0.67%	9	0.04%	-119	-0.51%	23,118
Bedford City	1,281	63.76%	720	35.84%	8	0.40%			561	27.92%	2,009
Bristol City	2,347	56.42%	1,771	42.57%	42	1.01%			576	13.85%	4,160
Buena Vista City	924	47.34%	1,014	51.95%	14	0.72%			-90	-4.61%	1,952
Charlottesville City	5,207	49.81%	5,185	49.60%	57	0.55%	4	0.04%	22	0.21%	10,453
Chesapeake City	11,476	44.23%	14,345	55.28%	127	0.49%			-2,869	-11.06%	25,948
Clifton Forge City	864	50.06%	856	49.59%	6	0.35%			8	0.46%	1,726
Colonial Heights City	4,081	71.26%	1,631	28.48%	15	0.26%			2,450	42.78%	5,727
Covington City	1,169	44.88%	1,420	54.51%	16	0.61%			-251	-9.64%	2,605
Danville City	9,050	67.53%	4,272	31.88%	80	0.60%			4,778	35.65%	13,402
Emporia City	1,030	59.54%	629	36.36%	71	4.10%			401	23.18%	1,730
Fairfax City	2,992	58.98%	2,046	40.33%	34	0.67%	1	0.02%	946	18.65%	5,073
Falls Church City	1,851	57.56%	1,344	41.79%	21	0.65%			507	15.76%	3,216
Franklin City	971	51.84%	846	45.17%	56	2.99%			125	6.67%	1,873
Fredericksburg City	1,841	48.47%	1,916	50.45%	41	1.08%			-75	-1.97%	3,798
Galax City	1,078	58.56%	703	38.19%	60	3.26%			375	20.37%	1,841
Hampton City	12,346	45.55%	14,656	54.07%	105	0.39%			-2,310	-8.52%	27,107
Harrisonburg City	2,949	68.89%	1,311	30.62%	21	0.49%			1,638	38.26%	4,281
Hopewell City	3,568	58.05%	2,556	41.59%	22	0.36%			1,012	16.47%	6,146
Lexington City	1,050	57.25%	778	42.42%	5	0.27%	1	0.05%	272	14.83%	1,834
Lynchburg City	12,762	71.21%	5,081	28.35%	75	0.42%	3	0.02%	7,681	42.86%	17,921
Manassas City	1,478	62.49%	876	37.04%	10	0.42%	1	0.04%	602	25.45%	2,365
Manassas Park City	338	41.02%	478	58.01%	8	0.97%			-140	-16.99%	824
Martinsville City	3,449	60.74%	2,199	38.73%	29	0.51%	1	0.02%	1,250	22.01%	5,678
Newport News City	16,532	49.58%	16,395	49.17%	411	1.23%	3	0.01%	137	0.41%	33,341
Norfolk City	21,022	39.11%	32,420	60.31%	311	0.58%			-11,398	-21.20%	53,753
Norton City	442	44.11%	552	55.09%	8	0.80%			-110	-10.98%	1,002
Petersburg City	4,474	42.94%	5,824	55.90%	120	1.15%	1	0.01%	-1,350	-12.96%	10,419
Poquoson City	1,305	61.67%	799	37.76%	12	0.57%			506	23.91%	2,116
Portsmouth City	10,390	37.48%	16,910	61.00%	423	1.53%			-6,520	-23.52%	27,723
Radford City	2,321	61.35%	1,427	37.72%	33	0.87%	2	0.05%	894	23.63%	3,783
Richmond City	32,512	50.26%	31,454	48.63%	692	1.07%	24	0.04%	1,058	1.64%	64,682
Roanoke City	13,906	52.65%	12,344	46.74%	158	0.60%	4	0.02%	1,562	5.91%	26,412
Salem City	4,102	61.29%	2,539	37.94%	50	0.75%	2	0.03%	1,563	23.35%	6,693
South Boston City	1,465	69.46%	607	28.78%	37	1.75%			858	40.68%	2,109
Staunton City	4,210	69.10%	1,859	30.51%	22	0.36%	2	0.03%	2,351	38.59%	6,093
Suffolk City	5,747	45.11%	6,683	52.46%	308	2.42%	1	0.01%	-936	-7.35%	12,739
Virginia Beach City	26,875	57.33%	19,810	42.26%	188	0.40%	2	0.00%	7,065	15.07%	46,875
Waynesboro City	3,175	67.80%	1,490	31.82%	18	0.38%			1,685	35.98%	4,683
Williamsburg City	1,485	60.61%	951	38.82%	14	0.57%			534	21.80%	2,450
Winchester City	3,069	69.54%	1,319	29.89%	24	0.54%	1	0.02%	1,750	39.66%	4,413
Totals	699,302	55.90%	541,319	43.27%	10,101	0.81%	218	0.02%	157,983	12.63%	1,250,940

Counties and independent cities that flipped from Independent to Republican

- Accomack
- Arlington
- Bath
- Botetourt
- Brunswick
- Cumberland
- Giles
- Greene
- Grayson
- Henry
- James City (no municipalities)
- Louisa
- New Kent
- Montgomery
- Northampton
- Patrick
- Page
- Prince George
- Pulaski
- Rockbridge
- Smyth
- Tazewell
- Warren
- Washington
- York
- Charlottesville (independent city)
- Clifton Forge (independent city)
- Falls Church (independent city)
- Newport News (independent city)
- Richmond (independent city)
- Roanoke (independent city)
- Virginia Beach (independent city)

Counties and independent cities that flipped from Republican to Democratic

- King George
- Rappahannock
- Suffolk

Counties and independent cities that flipped from Independent to Democratic

- Alleghany
- Buchanan
- Buckingham
- Caroline
- Charles City
- Craig
- Dickenson
- Dinwiddie
- Franklin
- Greensville
- Isle of Wight
- King and Queen
- Lee
- Nelson
- Russell
- Scott
- Spotsylvania
- Stafford
- Surry
- Sussex
- Wise
- Alexandria (independent city)
- Buena Vista (independent city)
- Chesapeake (independent city)
- Covington (independent city)
- Fredericksburg (independent city)
- Hampton (independent city)
- Norfolk (independent city)
- Norton (independent city)
- Petersburg (independent city)
- Portsmouth (independent city)

== Works cited ==
- Steed, Robert; Moreland, Laurence; Baker, Tod, eds. (1980). Party Politics in the South. Praeger Publishers. ISBN 0030565863.
