= Henry Howell =

American politician (1920–1997)

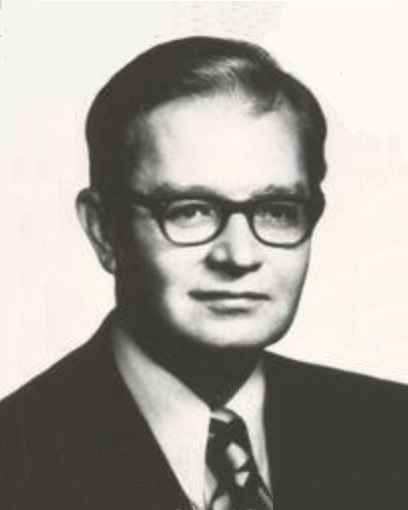
- Howell, circa 1972

31st Lieutenant Governor of Virginia
- In office December 4, 1971 – January 12, 1974
- Governor: Linwood Holton
- Preceded by: J. Sargeant Reynolds
- Succeeded by: John N. Dalton

Member of the Virginia Senate from the 2nd district
- In office January 12, 1966 – December 4, 1971
- Preceded by: None (seat created)
- Succeeded by: Herbert H. Bateman

Member of the Virginia House of Delegates from Norfolk City
- In office January 8, 1964 – January 12, 1966
- In office January 13, 1960 – January 10, 1962

Personal details
- Born: Henry Evans Howell Jr. September 5, 1920 Norfolk, Virginia, U.S.
- Died: July 7, 1997 (aged 76) Norfolk, Virginia, U.S.
- Party: Democratic (before 1971, 1977–1997)
- Other political affiliations: Independent (1971–1977)
- Spouse: Elizabeth McCarty
- Education: College of William & Mary, Norfolk Division; University of Virginia (LL.B.)
- Profession: Attorney

Henry Evans Howell Jr. (September 5, 1920 – July 7, 1997), nicknamed "Howlin' Henry" Howell, was an American lawyer and politician from the Commonwealth of Virginia. A progressive populist and a member of the Democratic Party, he served in both houses of the Virginia General Assembly, was elected the 31st Lieutenant Governor of Virginia as an Independent Democrat, and made several runs for governor.

== Early life ==
Born and raised in Norfolk, Virginia, Howell attended the local public schools. He earned a degree from Old Dominion College and a Bachelor of Laws from the University of Virginia.

== Early political campaigns ==
Howell first became involved in political campaigns in 1949. He worked for the unsuccessful gubernatorial candidate Francis Pickens Miller against John S. Battle, the favored candidate of the Byrd Organization, the state's political machine, in the Democratic primary. After defeating Miller in the primary, Battle went on to win the general election. In 1952, Howell managed Miller's campaign against incumbent U.S. Senator Harry F. Byrd, the leader of the political machine, a campaign that Miller also lost.

The following year, Howell ran for a seat in the Virginia House of Delegates (a part-time position) but failed to win election. In 1959, during the Massive Resistance crisis, as the Byrd Organization closed Norfolk's schools until Governor J. Lindsay Almond acceded to decisions of the Virginia Supreme Court and a three-judge federal panel mandating desegregation, Howell was elected as one of Norfolk's several representatives, along with Joshua Warren White and James W. Roberts. However, he failed to be re-elected in what was redistricted as District 51 in 1961. In 1963, after Howell and Arlington's Edmund D. Campbell won the Davis v. Mann redistricting case, Norfolk's voters elected Howell along with White and Robert to represent them in what had become District 50.

In 1965, Howell won election to the Virginia Senate.

== Statewide political campaigns ==
A fiery left-wing populist, Howell assailed big business, particularly banks, insurance companies, and monopolies. A favorite target was Dominion Energy, then known as VEPCO (Virginia Electric Power Company), which Howell claimed stood for "Very Expensive Power Company." A supporter of civil rights for African Americans, Howell campaigned against massive resistance, was a major proponent of desegregation, and filed a successful lawsuit to abolish the state's poll tax. A believer in workers' right to organize, he often attempted to repeal Virginia's right-to-work law.

In 1969, Howell made his first run for governor by challenging former Ambassador William C. Battle, son of former Governor John S. Battle, for the nomination. Battle won the primary, and went on to lose the election to A. Linwood Holton Jr., Virginia's first elected Republican governor and the first Republican to hold the office since Reconstruction Governor Gilbert Carlton Walker in 1869. One analyst attributed Holton's victory not only to attracting liberal and African-American votes but also because Howell's backers had "bolted the party to nail the coffin shut" on the Byrd Organization. Holton served until January 1974.

When the popular Lieutenant Governor J. Sargeant Reynolds died in 1971, Howell entered the race to fill the remaining two years of his term. Running as an Independent Democrat, Howell campaigned on a promise to "Keep the Big Boys Honest," a slogan that he would retain in later campaigns. He received 362,371 votes (40%), compared to 334,580 votes (37%) for Democrat George J. Kostel and 209,861 votes (23%) for Republican George P. Shafran.

In 1973, Howell made his second run for governor, now as an Independent Democrat. The state Democratic Party ran no candidate, and the Republicans nominated former Governor Mills E. Godwin Jr., a conservative Democrat who had chaired an organization called "Democrats for Nixon" in 1972. Howell failed to get the backing of the Democratic establishment within Virginia.

The Virginian-Pilot described Howell's campaign: "He rumbled from one remote country store to another in a loudspeaker-equipped camper blaring hillbilly music.... He staged rallies with the trappings of revival tent meetings – live music, cardboard buckets for campaign offerings, and the candidate himself calling on the faithful to 'witness' for his cause with their votes."

Godwin won with 525,075 votes (51%) to Howell's 510,103 votes (49%), a narrow margin of 15,000 votes. Howell was able to win in rural Appalachian Virginia and with African-American voters but failed due to lack of support in wealthy suburban areas. Garrett Epps, a reporter for the Richmond Mercury, would later write a fictionalized account of the race, entitled The Shad Treatment. Howell later described the 1973 campaign as "the high point" of his life.

In 1977, Howell made his final run for elective office, campaigning for governor as a Democrat. Although former State Attorney General Andrew P. Miller, his chief primary opponent, outspent him by a ratio of 3-to-1, Howell defeated him in the primary with 253,373 votes (51%) but went on to lose the general election, taking 541,319 votes (43%) to Republican Lieutenant Governor John N. Dalton's 699,302 votes (56%). Charles Robb, who won election as lieutenant governor in that election, took action to align the personal animosity which had evolved between the Miller and Howell factions, by persuading former United States Senator William Spong to chair a commission to revitalize the state Democratic party. Virginia Democrats then moved from a primary election to a convention system, and Robb's political career continued, but Howell's ended.

== Death and legacy ==
After losing the 1977 election, Howell retired to Norfolk, dying of cancer on July 7, 1997.

Although he failed to win Virginia's highest office, Howell put a definitive end to the rule of the conservative Byrd machine, helped consolidate gains of the Civil Rights Movement, and partnered with and mobilized newly enfranchised African-American voters. He offered the previously marginalized unprecedented recognition and respect in the state's transforming politics. He was much more progressive, less compromising, and more anti-Establishment than most of the so-called "New South" Democrats who emerged in the 1970s, such as Jimmy Carter, Reubin Askew, and Dale Bumpers. That hampered his success in a state that had rarely experienced a strong populist movement. However, his rejection of Virginia's racist legacy and the cross-racial coalitions he built prefigured the historic 1989 election of L. Douglas Wilder as the state's first African-American governor, as well as Barack Obama's victories in Virginia in two consecutive presidential elections. Eulogizing Howell, political scientist Larry Sabato, who had worked for Howell, praised how he drew support both from liberals and conservatives because he sought "power not for its own sake but to help others, to serve people and not the political class."

Senate of Virginia
Preceded by newly created seat	Virginia Senate, District 2; 1966–1971; Served alongside: Robert F. Baldwin, Edward L. Breeden, Peter K. Babalas	Succeeded by Herbert H. Bateman
Political offices
Preceded by J. Sargeant Reynolds	Lieutenant Governor of Virginia; 1971–1974	Succeeded by John N. Dalton
Party political offices
Preceded by William C. Battle	Democratic nominee for Governor of Virginia; 1973 (endorsed), 1977	Succeeded by Chuck Robb
