= Gary Devore (archaeologist) =

American archaeologist

Gary Devore is an archaeologist and author currently affiliated with Stanford University.

He is a director and principal investigator of the Binchester Project excavating the Binchester Roman Fort in the UK.

He is a former director of the Pompeii Archaeological Research Project: Porta Stabia (PARP:PS) that excavated in Pompeii from 2005-2009.

== Works ==
Apart from his archaeological work, Devore has written an expansive novel called Pantheon (ISBN 978-1-105-08767-7) that tells the story of the ancient Greek and Roman gods reclaiming their worship in the modern world. It is a Humanistic work that critiques many aspects of organized religion.

Devore is also the author of a guidebook to Rome targeted toward "tourists and scholars who are interested in exploring first-hand the grandeur and magnificence that was ancient Rome through a Humanist, secular, and freethinking lens." It is called Walking Tours of Ancient Rome: A Secular Guidebook to the Eternal City (ISBN 978-1-105-33665-2).
