= John N. Dalton =

American politician (1931–1986)

John Dalton
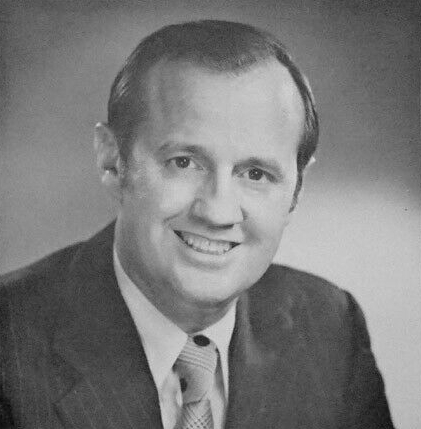
- Dalton in the 1970s

63rd Governor of Virginia
- In office January 14, 1978 – January 16, 1982
- Lieutenant: Chuck Robb
- Preceded by: Mills Godwin
- Succeeded by: Chuck Robb

32nd Lieutenant Governor of Virginia
- In office January 12, 1974 – January 14, 1978
- Governor: Mills Godwin
- Preceded by: Henry Howell
- Succeeded by: Chuck Robb

Member of the Virginia Senate from the 37th district
- In office January 10, 1973 – December 4, 1973
- Preceded by: James Turk
- Succeeded by: Madison Marye

Member of the Virginia House of Delegates from the 6th district
- In office January 12, 1966 – January 10, 1973
- Preceded by: Kenneth Devore
- Succeeded by: Ward Teel

Personal details
- Born: John Clay Nichols; July 11, 1931 Emporia, Virginia, U.S.
- Died: July 30, 1986 (aged 55) Richmond, Virginia, U.S.
- Party: Republican
- Spouse: Eddy Panzer (m. 1956)
- Children: 4
- Education: College of William & Mary (BA) University of Virginia (LLB)

Military service
- Allegiance: United States
- Branch/service: United States Army
- Years of service: 1954–1956
- Rank: First lieutenant

John Nichols Dalton (July 11, 1931 – July 30, 1986) was an American politician who served as the 63rd governor of Virginia, from 1978 to 1982. Dalton won the office with 55.9% of the vote, defeating Democrat Henry E. Howell Jr. and Independent Alan R. Ogden. Dalton had previously served as Lieutenant Governor of Virginia.

== Biography ==
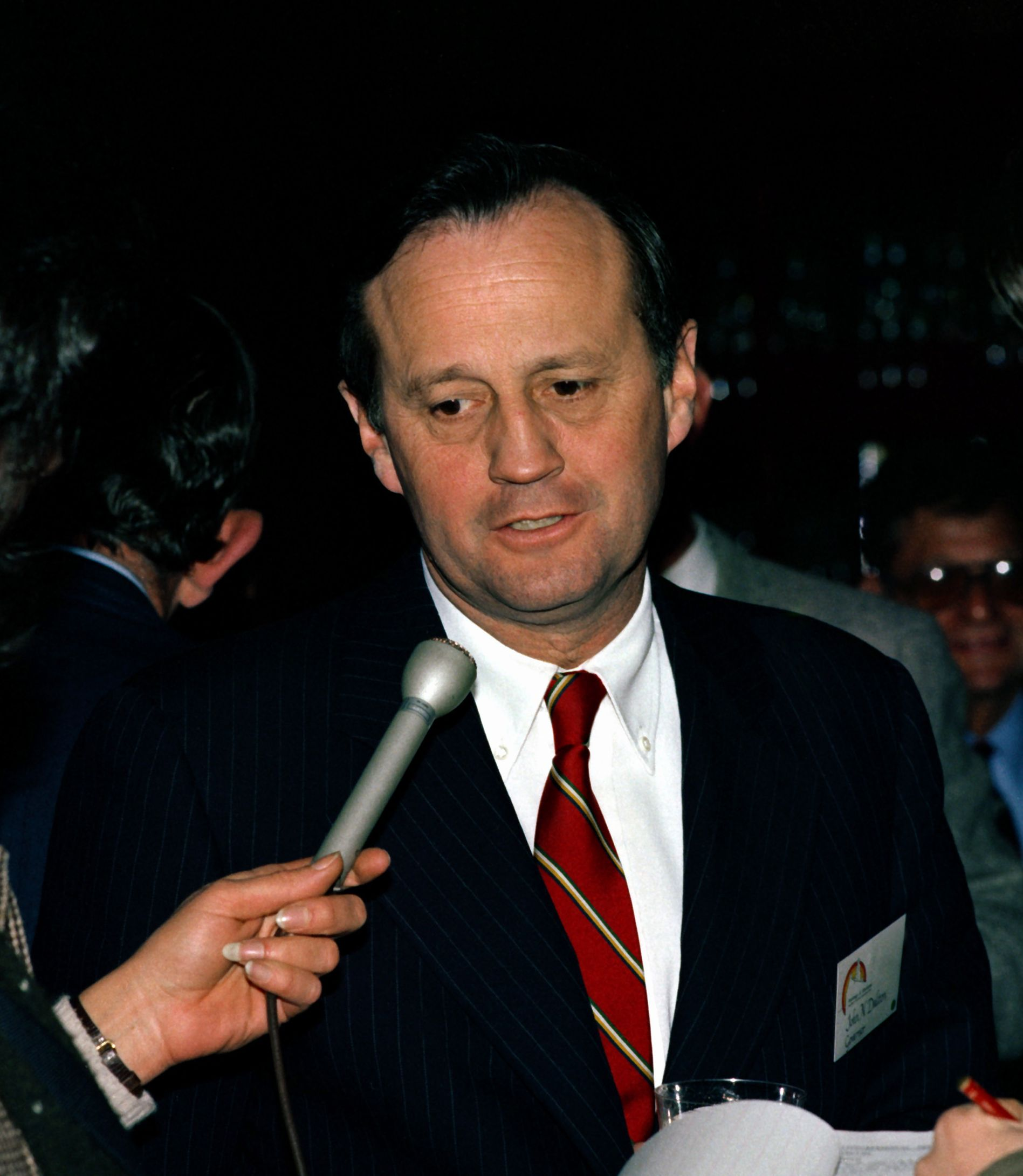
Dalton in 1981

Born in Emporia, Virginia, Dalton graduated from the College of William and Mary in Williamsburg, Virginia in 1953, and the University of Virginia School of Law in 1957 . He served in both houses of the General Assembly (Virginia House of Delegates, 1966–1972, Senate of Virginia, 1973). Dalton was the 32nd Lieutenant Governor from 1974 to 1978. As governor, he pursued policies of limited government. He also settled the federal lawsuit on the desegregation of Virginia's institutions of higher education.

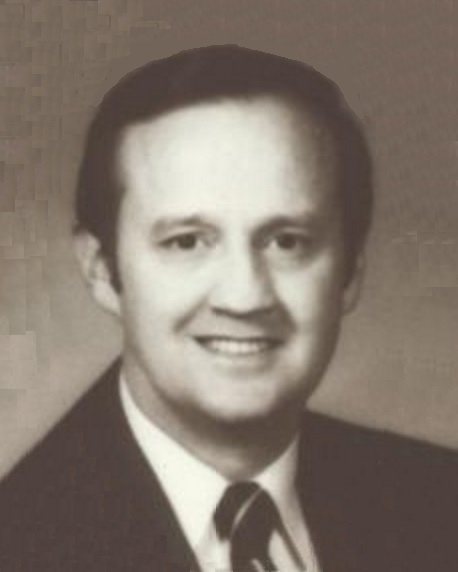
Dalton as lieutenant governor.

Dalton was the adopted son of Theodore Roosevelt Dalton, his uncle, who was the Republican candidate for governor in 1953 and 1957. As a young man his next-door neighbor was Charlotte Giesen, first Republican woman elected to the House of Delegates. Dalton died at 55 of lung cancer. He is buried at Sunrise Burial Park in Radford.

His personal papers, including those from his time as governor, are held by the Special Collections Research Center at the College of William & Mary. His executive papers from his time as governor are held by the Library of Virginia. Dalton Intermediate School, in Radford, Virginia, is named after the former governor. Dalton Hall, a building at Radford University that houses dining facilities, and the university bookstore is named for Dalton.

Dalton's son-in-law, Steve Baril, sought the 2005 Republican nomination for attorney general of Virginia.

Political offices
Preceded by Henry Howell	Lieutenant Governor of Virginia; 1974–1978	Succeeded by Chuck Robb
Preceded by Mills Godwin	Governor of Virginia; 1978–1982	Succeeded by Chuck Robb
Party political offices
Preceded by Mills Godwin	Republican nominee Governor of Virginia; 1977	Succeeded by Marshall Coleman
Preceded by Richard A. Snelling	Chair of the Republican Governors Association; 1980–1981	Succeeded by James R. Thompson
