= 2026 Virginia Question 3 =

Referendum on voting rights

- November 3, 2026
- Question: Should the Constitution of Virginia be amended (i) to provide for the fundamental right to vote in the Commonwealth, (ii) to revise the qualifications of voters so that a person convicted of a felony is not entitled to vote during his period of incarceration but is automatically invested with the right to vote upon release from incarceration, and (iii) to update the existing prohibition on voting by persons found to be mentally incompetent to instead apply to persons who have been found to lack the capacity to understand the act of voting?
- Reporting: 96.6% as of 10:41 a.m. EST
- Outcome: Passed

Results
Choice	Votes	%
Yes	1,990,915	56.51%
No	1,532,196	43.49%
County and independent city results
Yes
80–90%
70–80%
60–70%
50–60%
No
70–80%
60–70%
50–60%

Question 3 is a legislatively referred constitutional amendment on the November 2026 ballot in the state of Virginia. If passed, voting rights would automatically be restored to all formerly-incarcerated individuals after release from prison. Currently, formerly-incarcerated individuals must apply to the governor for restoration.

== Background ==
=== Lifetime ban ===
Disenfranchisement laws per US State based on felony conviction as of May 2023

The Virginia Constitutional Convention of 1901–02 enacted a new constitution which imposed a lifetime ban on registering to vote for anyone who had been convicted of a felony, only allowing for felons to receive restoration of their voting rights from the governor. In addition, the convention imposed a system of poll taxes along with literacy and understanding requirements to vote that had the effect of restricting the electorate. The outcome was almost immediate disenfranchising of blacks and half the previous number of whites voting.

As recently as 2016, at least 7 percent of adult citizens in Virginia, including 22 percent of African-American voters in Virginia, were disfranchised from voting due to the lifetime ban on former felons.

Governors Bob McDonnell, Terry McAuliffe and Ralph Northam all pursued forms of automated restoration to those who applied, but Governor Glenn Youngkin ended the policy of automated restoration in favor of case-by-case restoration.

In 2026, the U.S. District Court for the Eastern District of Virginia ruled in King v. O'Bannon that felons can only lose their voting rights if the offense was recognized as a common-law felony in 1870, at the time Virginia was readmitted to the Union. Common-law offenses in 1870 such as murder, manslaughter, assault, larceny, rape, and arson result in automatic disenfranchisement. Offenses that "may correlate" to a common-law felony, such as terrorism or crimes against children, result in a personal review by the Office of the Attorney General of Virginia. All other offenses do not result in voter disenfranchisement.

=== Legislative history ===
==== 2021–2022 ====
A joint resolution to initiate the amendment was passed by the General Assembly in February 2021. After Democrats lost the House in the following elections, the bill was passed in the Senate but was defeated in a House committee in 2022.

==== 2025–2026 ====
HJ2 / SJ248 was legislatively initiated by the Virginia Senate on March 24, 2025. The equivalent language in HJ2/SJ2 was passed by the House on January 14, 2026 and affirmed in the Senate on January 16, 2026, sending the amendment to voters for approval.

== Contents and amendment ==
The following will be shown to voters on the ballot for the amendment:

Question: Should the Constitution of Virginia be amended (i) to provide for the fundamental right to vote in the Commonwealth, (ii) to revise the qualifications of voters so that a person convicted of a felony is not entitled to vote during his period of incarceration but is automatically invested with the right to vote upon release from incarceration, and (iii) to update the existing prohibition on voting by persons found to be mentally incompetent to instead apply to persons who have been found to lack the capacity to understand the act of voting?

If agreed to by voters, Section 1 of Article II of the Constitution of Virginia will be amended as follows:

Section 1. Qualifications of voters.

(a) In elections by the people, the qualifications of voters shall be as follows: Each voter shall be a citizen of the United States, shall be eighteen years of age, shall fulfill the residence requirements set forth in ~~this section~~ subsection (b), and shall be registered to vote pursuant to this article. Every person who meets these qualifications shall have the fundamental right to vote in the Commonwealth, and such right shall not be abridged by law, except that:

(1) No person who has been convicted of a felony shall be ~~qualified~~ entitled to vote ~~unless his civil rights have been restored by the Governor or other appropriate authority.~~ during any period of incarceration for such felony conviction, but every such person, upon release from incarceration for that felony conviction and without further action required of him, shall be invested with all political rights, including the right to vote; and

~~As prescribed by law, no~~ (2) No person who has been adjudicated ~~to be mentally incompetent~~ by a court of competent jurisdiction to lack the capacity to understand the act of voting shall be ~~qualified~~ entitled to vote during such period of incapacity until his ~~competency~~ capacity has been reestablished as prescribed by law.

(b) The residence requirements shall be that each voter shall be a resident of the Commonwealth and of the precinct where he votes. Residence, for all purposes of qualification to vote, requires both domicile and a place of abode. The General Assembly may provide for persons who are employed overseas, and their spouses and dependents residing with them, and who are qualified to vote except for relinquishing their place of abode in the Commonwealth while overseas, to vote in the Commonwealth subject to conditions and time limits defined by law. The General Assembly may provide for persons who are qualified to vote except for having moved their residence from one precinct to another within the Commonwealth to continue to vote in a former precinct subject to conditions and time limits defined by law. The General Assembly may also provide, in elections for President and Vice President of the United States, alternatives to registration for new residents of the Commonwealth.

(c) Any person who will be qualified with respect to age to vote at the next general election shall be permitted to register in advance and also to vote in any intervening primary or special election.

== Endorsements ==
Yes

U.S. senators

- Mark Warner (2009-present) (Democratic)

U.S. representatives

- James Walkinshaw, VA-11 (2025–present) (Democratic)

Statewide officials

- David Bulova, Virginia Secretary of Natural Resources (2026–present) (Democratic)
- Mark Sickles, Virginia Secretary of Finance (2026–present) (Democratic)
- Abigail Spanberger, governor of Virginia (2026–present) (Democratic)

State legislators

- 61 state delegates (Note: Kimberly Adams, HD-82 (2026–present) (Democratic); Jessica Anderson, HD-71 (2026–present) (Democratic); Bonita Anthony, HD-92 (2024–present) (Democratic); Alex Askew, HD-95 (2024–present) (Democratic); Elizabeth Bennett-Parker, HD-39 (2026–present) (Democratic); Katrina Callsen, HD-54 (2024–present) (Democratic); Kacey Carnegie, HD-89 (2026–present) (Democratic); Betsy Carr, HD-78 (2024–present) (Democratic); Stacey Carroll, HD-64 (2026–present) (Democratic); Mike Cherry, HD-74 (2024–present) (Republican); Nadarius Clark, HD-84 (2024–present) (Democratic); Laura Jane Cohen, HD-15 (2024–present) (Democratic); Joshua Cole, HD-65 (2024–present) (Democratic); Nicole Cole, HD-66 (2026–present) (Democratic); Kelly Convirs-Fowler, HD-96 (2024–present) (Democratic); Rae Cousins, HD-79 (2024–present) (Democratic); Karrie Delaney, HD-9 (2024–present) (Democratic); Lindsey Dougherty, HD-75 (2026–present) (Democratic); Mark Downey, HD-69 (2026–present) (Democratic); Michael Feggans, HD-97 (2024–present) (Democratic); Lily Franklin, HD-41 (2026–present) (Democratic); Debra Gardner, HD-76 (2024–present) (Democratic); Jackie Glass, HD-93 (2024–present) (Democratic); Elizabeth Guzmán, HD-22 (2026–present) (Democratic); Cliff Hayes, HD-91 (2024–present) (Democratic); Dan Helmer, HD-10 (2024–present) (Democratic); Rozia Henson, HD-19 (2024–present) (Democratic); Phil Hernandez, HD-94 (2024–present) (Democratic); Charniele Herring, HD-4 (2024–present) (Democratic); Patrick Hope, HD-1 (2024–present) (Democratic); Karen Keys-Gamarra, HD-7 (2024–present) (Democratic); Paul Krizek, HD-16 (2024–present) (Democratic); Amy Laufer, HD-55 (2024–present) (Democratic); Destiny LeVere Bolling, HD-80 (2024–present) (Democratic); Alfonso Lopez, HD-3 (2024–present) (Democratic); Michelle Maldonado, former HD-20 (2024–2026) (Democratic); Marty Martinez, HD-29 (2024–present) (Democratic); John McAuliff, HD-30 (2026–present) (Democratic); Adele McClure, HD-2 (2024–present) (Democratic); R. Kirk McPike, HD-5 (2026–present) (Democratic); Delores McQuinn, HD-81 (2024–present) (Democratic); Leslie Mehta, HD-73 (2026–present) (Democratic); May Nivar, HD-57 (2026–present) (Democratic); Marcia Price, HD-85 (2024–present) (Democratic); Sam Rasoul, HD-38 (2024–present) (Democratic); Atoosa Reaser, HD-27 (2024–present) (Democratic); David Reid, HD-28 (2024–present) (Democratic); Don Scott, Speaker (2024–present) HD-88 (2020–present) (Democratic); Holly Seibold, HD-12 (2024–present) (Democratic); Briana Sewell, HD-25 (2024–present) (Democratic); Irene Shin, HD-8 (2024–present) (Democratic); Marcus Simon, HD-13 (2024–present) (Democratic); Shelly Simonds, HD-70 (2024–present) (Democratic); Jas Jeet Singh, HD-26 (2025–present) (Democratic); Rip Sullivan, HD-6 (2024–present) (Democratic); Joshua Thomas, HD-21 (2024–present) (Democratic); Virgil Thornton Sr., HD-86 (2026–present) (Democratic); Luke Torian, HD-24 (2024–present) (Democratic); Kathy Tran, HD-18 (2024–present) (Democratic); Jeion Ward, HD-87 (2024–present) (Democratic); Vivian Watts, HD-14 (2024–present) (Democratic); Rodney Willett, HD-58 (2024–present) (Democratic))
- 3 state senators (Note: Michael Jones, state senator from the 15th district (2026–present) (Democratic); Mamie Locke, state senator from the 2nd district (2004–2024), 23rd district (2024–present) (Democratic); Scott Surovell, state senator from the 36th district (2016–2024), 34th district (2024–present) (Democratic))

Organizations

- ACLU Virginia
- Democratic Socialists of America
- Equality Virginia
- League of Women Voters Virginia
- Metro DC Democratic Socialists of America
- Prison Fellowship
- The Sentencing Project
- Virginia Catholic Conference
- Virginia League of Conservation Voters
- Virginia NAACP

Political parties

- Democratic Party of Virginia
No

Federal officials

- Todd Gilbert, former United States Attorney for the Western District of Virginia (2025) (Republican)

State legislators

- 4 state delegates (Note: Tim Anderson, former state delegate from the 83rd district (2022–2023) (Republican); Terry Kilgore, Minority Leader (2025–present) HD-45 (2024–present); Paul Milde, former state delegate from the 64th district (2024–2026) (Republican); Bill Wiley, state delegate from the 32nd district (2024–present) (Republican))
- 2 state senators (Note: Chris Head, state senator from the 3rd district (2024-present) (Republican); Mark Peake, state senator from the 3rd district (2024-present) (Republican))

Individuals

- John Reid, talk radio host and nominee for lieutenant governor in 2025 (Republican)

Political parties

- Republican Party of Virginia

== Results ==
Voting Rights Restoration Amendment results
Choice
For
Against
Total

(Ballot Measure 3 was unofficially 'called' as approved by a majority of voters in the 2-Nov-2026 general election.)

== See also ==
- Felony disenfranchisement in the United States
- Rights Restoration
- 2026 Virginia elections
- 2018 Florida Amendment 4
- 2026 United States ballot measures
