= Felony disenfranchisement in Virginia =

Felony disenfranchisement in Virginia was a provision of the Constitution of Virginia which prohibits all convicted felons, regardless of the nature of their crime or time since incarceration, from ever voting in Virginia elections, unless their rights are personally restored by the Governor of Virginia. Restoration of voting rights continues to be a debated issue in the politics of Virginia, as it was the only U.S. state to permanently disenfranchise felons for all offenses.

Disenfranchisement laws per US State based on felony conviction as of May 2023.

As of September 11, 2026, the only common law crimes that disqualified a person from voting in Virginia are three: murder, voluntary manslaughter, and involuntary manslaughter. In the 2026 midterm elections Virginians voted for an 2026 Virginia Question 3 which restored voting rights to felons in Virginia after they are no longer incarcerated with 55% voting yes. It is set to take effect January 1st of the following year.

In 2026, the U.S. District Court for the Eastern District of Virginia ruled in King v. O'Bannon that felons can only lose their voting rights if the offense was recognized as a common-law felony in 1870, at the time Virginia was readmitted to the Union. Common-law offenses in 1870 such as murder, manslaughter, assault, larceny, rape, and arson result in automatic disenfranchisement. Offenses that "may correlate" to a common-law felony, such as terrorism or crimes against children, result in a personal review by the Office of the Attorney General of Virginia. All other offenses do not result in voter disenfranchisement.

The Governor of Virginia have historically played a role in restoring felon's voting rights. Democratic Governor Terry McAuliffe instituted a policy of near-automatic restoration, signing over 168,000 restoration orders, a policy continued by his successor Ralph Northam, who signed 126,000. Republican Governor Glenn Youngkin proved to be far more conservative with restoration, only signing fewer than 10,000 orders, and considered details such as whether restitution was still owed and if the offense was violent or not. Sitting Governor Abigail Spanberger has pledged to return to near-automatic restoration.

In 2026, a proposed amendment passed the Virginia General Assembly, which would automatically restore voting rights to formerly incarcerated persons, so long as they completed any required parole, probation, and payment of fines. Virginia will vote on the amendment in the 2026 election on November 3. Virginia voters voted to pass the felony enfranchisement law on November 3, 2026 which was called Ballot 3 to restore voting rights to former felons who were no longer in prison in the November 3, 2026 US mid-term elections.

== History ==
The 1830 Virginia constitution limited disenfranchisement to "infamous crimes", while its 1851 successor drafted by reformers added bribery and the 1870 charter targeted treason and corruption. The 1902 constitution contained a clause that disenfranchised Virginians convicted of numerous crimes, including "treason or of any felony, bribery, petit larceny, obtaining money or property under false pretenses, embezzlement, forgery, or perjury." The current constitution was adopted in 1972.

=== Executive actions ===
In May 2013, Governor Bob McDonnell established an automated process for voting rights restoration for residents convicted of non-violent offenses and ended the two-year waiting period for any non-violent incarceree's application for restoration. The executive order required beneficiaries to receive a restoration certificate prior to registering to vote. The order ended the commonwealth's lifetime ban on voting rights restoration.

In April 2014, Governor Terry McAuliffe expanded upon McDonnell's order, reducing the waiting period for rehabilitated violent incarceree's application from five years to three, as well as broadened the categories of non-violent felons eligible for automatic restoration. On 30 June 2014, McAuliffe officially removed application requirements for non-violent felons. Offenders with "violent/more serious" felonies were required to satisfy several conditions and appeal to the governor five years after the end of completing the sentence in order to regain voting rights. In June 2015, McAuliffe removed the requirement that citizens fully pay court costs and fees to have their voting rights restored.

On 22 April 2016, McAuliffe issued an executive order granting voting rights to every convicted felon in the state, violent and non-violent, who had been released from prison, on parole or probation.

After the Republican Party of Virginia sued to overturn the 2016 order, the Virginia Supreme Court ultimately ruled in Howell v. McAuliffe, in a 4–3 decision, that McAuliffe's executive order was unconstitutional, and that restoring voting rights must be an individualized process. In August 2016, McAuliffe responded to the ruling by issuing individual restoration orders on a rolling basis to Virginians with completed sentences, namely to "individuals who have been convicted of a felony and are no longer incarcerated or under active supervision . . . In addition to confirming completion of incarceration and supervised release, the SOC considers factors such as active warrants, pre-trial hold, and other concerns that may be flagged by law enforcement. . . . The Governor will review SOC's analysis of each individual’s record and will make the final decision on proposed candidates for restoration of rights."

McAuliffe noted that the next governor could have an entirely different policy on restoration of rights.

In March 2021, Governor Ralph Northam took executive action to automatically restore the right to vote to all Virginians on probation or parole.

In May 2022, Governor Glenn Youngkin ended all automatic restoration, rescinding prior executive orders. In March 2023, Youngkin updated the application form to ask for details including owed restitution and details of whether their conviction was for violent or non-violent offenses.

The number of voting rights restorations varied by governor:

- McDonnell: 8,000
- McAuliffe: 170,000
- Northam: 126,000
- Youngkin: fewer than 10,000

== Proposed constitutional amendments ==
A number of amendments have been proposed to revamp the requirements for restoration of rights. In 2017, the Virginia Senate passed a constitutional amendment to permanently disenfranchise violent felons, with the Virginia General Assembly being empowered to decide what constitutes a violent felony, but this died in the Virginia House of Delegates Privileges and Elections committee. Delegate Greg Habeeb had introduced a more moderate proposal than that proposed by Thomas Norment.

== See also ==
- Felony disenfranchisement in the United States
