= Virginia State Board of Elections =

The Virginia State Board of Elections (SBE) was created in 1946 as a nonpolitical agency responsible for ensuring uniformity, fairness, accuracy and purity in all elections in the Commonwealth of Virginia. The SBE promotes the proper administration of election laws, campaign finance disclosure compliance, and voter registration processes in the state by promulgating rules, regulations, issuing instructions, and providing information to local electoral boards and general registrars. In addition, the SBE maintains a centralized database of statewide voter registration and election related data.

== State Board ==
The SBE is a five-member body consisting of a chair, vice-chair, secretary, and two other members, that manages the electoral process and investigates and adjudicates disputes and campaign law violations. Under the Code of Virginia, "Three Board members shall be of the political party which cast the highest number of votes for Governor at that election." The Board has power to promulgate rules to initiate Circuit Court proceedings for the removal of county and city electoral board members. It can call on the Attorney General of Virginia to initiate investigations. It also certifies independent and third-party candidates for the ballot, after sending their Petitions of Qualified Voters (nominating petitions) to local registrars for signature counting. The Board has power to prescribe such forms. It posts lists of candidates on the Internet.

== Ballot access ==
Virginia has one of the most restrictive set of ballot access laws in the United States. According to the Code of Virginia subsection 24.2-101, without "major party" status for automatic ballot access in Virginia, minor party and independent candidates have to gather petition signatures to get on the ballot. For example, the requirement for statewide elections is 10,000 signatures, including at least 400 from each of Virginia's 11 congressional districts. In order for a minor party to gain automatic ballot access as a major party, one of its nominated candidates must receive 10% of the vote in a statewide race. To obtain the signatures necessary to receive statewide ballot access in Virginia, it has been quoted to cost between $45,000 to $90,000 or up to $100,000.

== Litigation ==
The Virginia State Board of Elections has been a party in a number of lawsuits.

=== Sarvis v. Judd ===
In July 2014, The Rutherford Institute supported the Libertarian Party of Virginia and alleged Virginia ballot laws favored "the election chances of Democrat and Republican candidates at the expense of Libertarian Party and independent candidates."

In Robert C. Sarvis, et al. v. Charles E. Judd, et al, the lawsuit was filed on behalf of the Libertarian Party of Virginia, several Libertarian Party candidates and an independent (non-party) candidate for public office in the November 2014 general election. The lawsuit challenged the Virginia State Board of Elections and the laws which require minor-party candidates to gather signatures on petitions to achieve ballot access as well as the laws which require minor-party and independent candidates' names to be placed below those of major-party candidates on the ballot.

=== Libertarian Party of Virginia v. Judd ===
In 2013, the ACLU supported the Libertarian Party of Virginia and contended that the Libertarians would suffer "irreparable harm" given Virginia's ballot access laws.

In Libertarian Party of Virginia v. Judd, the Libertarian Party won the case regarding state residency requirements for petition circulators per the United States Court of Appeals for the Fourth Circuit on May 29, 2013. It was the first time a minor party had won a constitutional election law case in the Fourth Circuit since 1989 and 1988. In response to the Fourth Circuit's ruling, the State of Virginia via former Attorney General Ken Cuccinelli as well as several other states, like Oklahoma, submitted petitions to the Supreme Court of the United States asking to reverse the Fourth Circuit's decision. On December 2, 2013, the petitions against the Fourth Circuit's ruling were denied by the Supreme Court, and so the Libertarian Party of Virginia won the case regarding state residency requirements for petition circulators.

=== Perry v. Judd ===
In January 2012, Texas Governor Rick Perry, former senator Rick Santorum, former House Speaker Newt Gingrich and former Utah Governor Jon Huntsman Jr. failed to qualify for the ballot and sued the State Board of Elections. U.S. District Judge John A. Gibney Jr. denied the request to add their names to Virginia's Republican primary ballot.

=== Project Vote v. Long ===
In February 2010, after receiving reports from local community partners regarding large numbers of rejected voter registration applications, Project Vote and its voting partner, Advancement Project, sought to review Norfolk's rejected registration applications to ascertain if qualified persons were unlawfully kept off the voting rolls. Elisa Long, the general registrar of Norfolk, and Nancy Rodrigues, secretary of the State Board of Elections denied Project Vote and Advancement Project the right to review the records, and both groups filed a lawsuit in U.S. District Court in Norfolk, Virginia.

In July 2011, the Court granted Project Vote's Motion for Summary Judgment and ordered the Norfolk County Registrar "to permit access to any requesting party for copy and/or inspection of voter registration applications and related records," in compliance with public disclosure requirements under the National Voter Registration Act.

=== Harper v. Virginia Board of Elections ===
In Harper v. Virginia Board of Elections (1966) the U.S. Supreme Court found that Virginia's poll tax was unconstitutional under the Equal Protection Clause of the Fourteenth Amendment. The Twenty-fourth Amendment (1964) prohibited poll taxes in federal elections. However, five states continued to impose a poll tax for voters in state elections. By this ruling, the Supreme Court banned the use of a poll tax in state elections.

== See also ==
- 2024 Virginia elections
- Elections in Virginia
- Virginia Department of Elections
- Election Assistance Commission
- New York State Board of Elections
- Oklahoma State Election Board
