= Donald Merricks =

American politician (born 1952)

Donald W. Merricks

Member of the Virginia House of Delegates from the 16th district
- In office January 9, 2008 – January 8, 2014
- Preceded by: Robert Hurt
- Succeeded by: Les Adams

Personal details
- Born: January 13, 1952 (age 74) Danville, Virginia
- Party: Republican
- Education: Danville Community College; Averett College
- Occupation: Businessman (building supplies)
- Committees: Commerce and Labor; Counties, Cities and Towns; Health, Welfare and Institutions; Militia, Police and Public Safety
- Website: donmerricks.org

Donald W. Merricks (born January 13, 1952) is an American politician. Since 2008 he has been a Republican member of the Virginia House of Delegates, representing the 16th district in Southside Virginia, made up of the city of Martinsville and parts of Henry and Pittsylvania Counties.

Merricks announced that he would not run for reelection in 2013.

Merricks is now a Board Member of the Virginia Department of Elections.

== Electoral history ==
Date	Election	Candidate	Party	Votes	%
Virginia House of Delegates, 16th district
November 6, 2007	General	Donald W. Merricks	Republican	10,744	64.00
November 6, 2007	General	G. Andy Parker	Democratic	6,034	35.94
November 6, 2007	General	Write Ins		9	0.05
November 6, 2007	General	Robert Hurt retired to run for state senate; seat stayed Republican			
November 3, 2009	General	Donald W. Merricks	Republican	13,074	99.50
November 3, 2009	General	Write Ins		65	0.49
November 8, 2011	General	Donald W. Merricks	Republican	14,343	99.06
November 8, 2011	General	Write Ins		135	0.93
