= John O'Bannon =

American politician (born 1948)

Chairman of the Virginia Department of Elections
- Incumbent
- Assumed office February 7, 2023
- Nominated by: Glenn Youngkin
- Preceded by: Vernon Baker

Member of the Virginia House of Delegates from the 73rd District
- In office January 10, 2001 – January 10, 2018
- Preceding: Eric Cantor
- Succeeded by: Debra Rodman

Personal details
- Born: John M. O'Bannon III; February 14, 1948 (age 78) Richmond, Virginia, U.S.
- Party: Republican
- Spouse: Patricia Anne Steinmetz
- Education: University of Richmond; Medical College of Virginia
- Profession: Neurologist
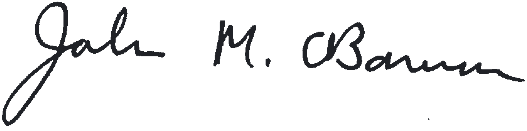
- Signature

John M. O'Bannon III (born February 14, 1948) is an American politician currently serving as the Chairman of the Virginia Department of Elections. A member of the Republican Party and practicing physician, he served as a member of the Virginia House of Delegates from 2001-2018.

== Early Life & Medical Career ==
O'Bannon was born in Richmond, Virginia. He grew up on a farm in Rappahannock County, selling apples at a fruit stand near Skyline Drive. He attended Hargrave Military Academy and later the University of Richmond. After graduating, he attended medical school at the Medical College of Virginia, later becoming chief resident of neurology.

He continues to work as a practicing neurologist in the Richmond, Virginia area. At various points, O'Bannon has held positions in the American Medical Association and the Medical Society of Virginia, and additionally served as chairman of the Richmond Academy of Medicine.

== Political career ==
From 2001-2018, O'Bannon served in the represented the 73rd district, made up of parts of the City of Richmond and Henrico County. He was a member of the committees on Appropriations, Health, Welfare and Institutions, and Privileges and Elections. In 2023, Governor Glenn Youngkin appointed O'Bannon to chair the Virginia Department of Elections. In his official capacity as chairman, he is the namesake defendant in the lawsuit King v. O'Bannon.
