= Debra Rodman =

American politician (born 1972)

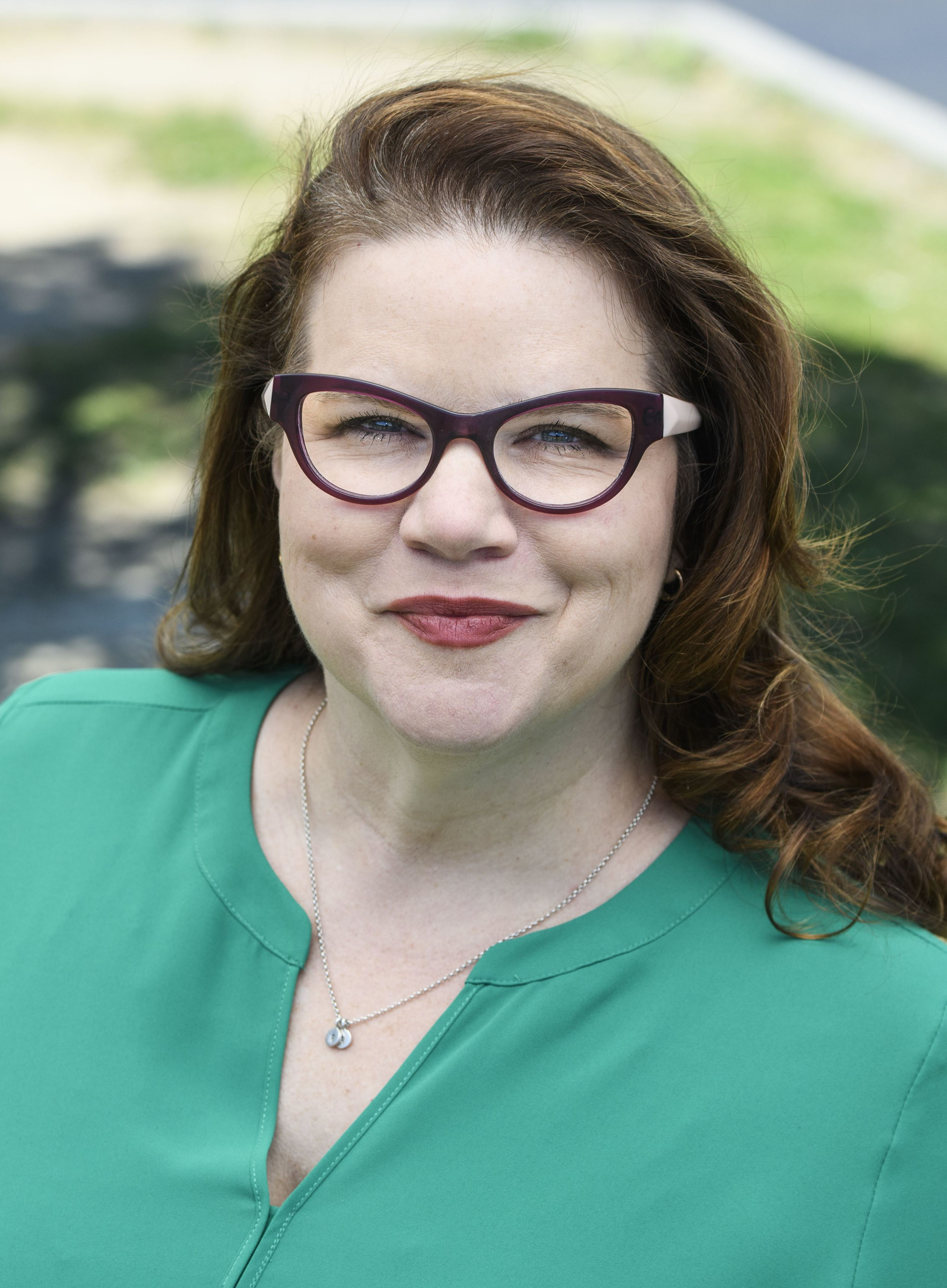

Member of the Virginia House of Delegates from the 73rd district
- In office January 10, 2018 – January 8, 2020
- Preceded by: John O'Bannon
- Succeeded by: Rodney Willett

Personal details
- Born: 1972 (age 53–54) Tallahassee, Florida
- Party: Democratic
- Spouse: Darryl Lowery
- Children: 2
- Education: University of Miami; University of Florida
- Profession: Anthropologist and professor
- Committees: Agriculture Chesapeake and Natural Resources; Education; Health, Welfare and Institutions
- Website: www.debrarodman.com

Debra H. Rodman (born 1972) is a former member of the Virginia House of Delegates. She was first elected in 2017, and represented the 73rd district comprising parts of Henrico County. Rodman is a member of the Democratic Party.

== Personal life and career ==
Debra Rodman was raised in Coral Gables, Florida. Rodman is an associate professor at Randolph-Macon College, teaching anthropology and women's studies. She travels to Guatemala yearly, where she researches the effects of migration on that country. Rodman also serves as an expert witness for asylum seekers. She is Jewish.

== Political career ==
In 2017, Rodman ran for the Virginia House of Delegates for the 73rd district, then held by Republican incumbent John O'Bannon. Rodman defeated three other candidates in a caucus on April 29, 2017, to win the Democratic nomination. In the general election, Rodman defeated O'Bannon by a 3% margin. She raised $373,000 over the course of the campaign, outraised by O'Bannon by nearly $200,000. In 2019, Rodman challenged incumbent Sen. Siobhan Dunnavant for the Senate of Virginia's 12th District seat. Rodman narrowly lost the election to Dunnavant on November 5, 2019.

== Electoral history ==
Date	Election	Candidate	Party	Votes	%
Virginia Senate, 12th district
November 5, 2019	General	Siobhan Dunnavant	Republican	39,700	50.76
November 5, 2019	General	Debra Rodman	Democratic	38,364	49.05

Date	Election	Candidate	Party	Votes	%
Virginia House of Delegates, 73rd district
November 7, 2017	General	Debra Rodman	Democratic	14,697	51.48
November 7, 2017	General	John O'Bannon	Republican	13,803	48.35

== Legislative issues ==
Rodman ran on and helped pass Medicaid Expansion, which gives health care access to over 400,000 Virginians. She also refuses to take money from Dominion Power or Appalachian Energy.

In the 2019 legislative session, Rodman was the chief sponsor for bills to expand LGBTQ equality, voting rights, and increase the tipped minimum wage.

Rodman was on the Education Committee, Health, Welfare and Institutions Committee, and Agriculture, Chesapeake and Natural Resources Committee.
