= Abigail Spanberger =

Governor of Virginia since 2026

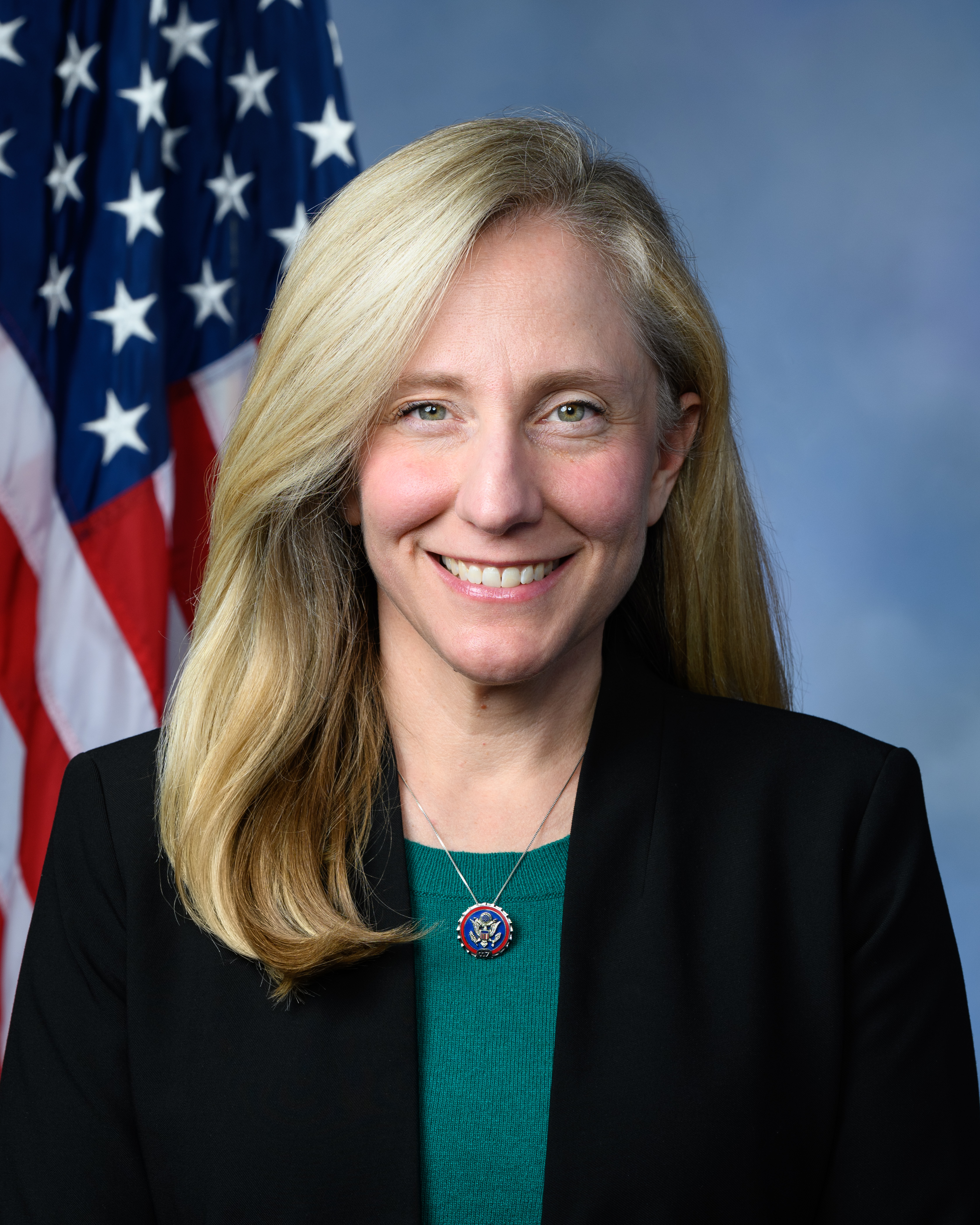
- Official portrait, 2023

75th Governor of Virginia
- Incumbent
- Assumed office January 17, 2026
- Lieutenant: Ghazala Hashmi
- Preceded by: Glenn Youngkin

Member of the U.S. House of Representatives from Virginia's 7th district
- In office January 3, 2019 – January 3, 2025
- Preceded by: Dave Brat
- Succeeded by: Eugene Vindman

Personal details
- Born: Abigail Anne Davis; August 7, 1979 (age 47) Red Bank, New Jersey, U.S.
- Party: Democratic
- Spouse: Adam Spanberger (m. 2006)
- Children: 3
- Education: University of Virginia (BA); Purdue University (MBA)
- Website: Official website
- Espionage activity
- Allegiance: United States
- Service branch: Central Intelligence Agency
- Service years: 2006–2014
- Rank: Operations officer
- Spanberger's voice Spanberger supporting the Inflation Reduction Act; Recorded August 12, 2022

Abigail Anne Spanberger (/ˈspænbɜːrɡər/ SPAN-bur-gər; née Davis; born August 7, 1979) is an American politician and former intelligence officer serving since 2026 as the 75th governor of Virginia. A member of the Democratic Party, she served from 2019 to 2025 as the U.S. representative for Virginia's 7th congressional district.

Spanberger was born in New Jersey and moved frequently during her childhood before her family settled in Virginia. She earned degrees from the University of Virginia and Purdue University. From 2006 to 2014, she was an officer in the Central Intelligence Agency. She was elected to the U.S. House of Representatives in 2018, unseating incumbent Republican Dave Brat. She was reelected in 2020 and 2022 before leaving Congress to run for governor.

Spanberger was elected governor of Virginia in 2025, defeating the Republican nominee, Lieutenant Governor Winsome Earle-Sears. She is Virginia's first female governor. In her first months as governor, Spanberger signed an assault weapons ban, increased the state's minimum wage, vetoed a recreational cannabis retail market and collective bargaining legislation, and supported the 2026 Virginia redistricting referendum.

== Early life and education ==
Spanberger was born Abigail Anne Davis in Red Bank, New Jersey, on August 7, 1979, her father, Martin Davis, a police officer, and her mother, Eileen Davis, a nurse. She knew from a young age that she wanted to be a spy, writing her diary in code.

Her family moved often when she was young, living in Maine, the New York City area, and Philadelphia, before settling in Short Pump, Virginia, when she was 13. Her father had moved from policing to federal law enforcement for the United States Postal Inspection Service. She graduated from John Randolph Tucker High School and was later a page for U.S. senator Chuck Robb.

Spanberger earned a Bachelor of Arts from the University of Virginia in 2001 and a Master of Business Administration from a joint program between the GISMA Business School in Germany and Purdue University's Krannert School of Management. She initially enrolled at the College of William and Mary before transferring to the University of Virginia. At the time she had completed her undergraduate degree at the University of Virginia, Spanberger was conversationally fluent in Spanish and "five or six more" languages.

== Career ==
In the early 2000s, Spanberger taught English literature as a substitute teacher at the Islamic Saudi Academy in Northern Virginia. She received a conditional job offer from the Central Intelligence Agency (CIA) in December 2002. While waiting for a background check to be completed, Spanberger worked as a postal inspector, as her father did, focusing on money laundering and narcotics cases.

In July 2006, after Spanberger's background check had been completed, she joined the CIA as a case officer, working to find, recruit, and build relationships with foreign nationals who could have had information of value to the U.S. government. She has publicly said that she gathered intelligence about nuclear proliferation and terrorism. Her first assignment was to Brussels, according to The Washington Post. During her intelligence career, she held five different passports, and met people undercover.

In 2014, Spanberger left the CIA and entered the private sector. She was hired to do consulting work for colleges and universities. After the 2016 presidential election, she began working with Emerge America to encourage women to run for state and congressional offices. In 2017, Virginia governor Terry McAuliffe appointed her to the Virginia Fair Housing Board.

== U.S. House of Representatives ==
=== Elections ===
==== 2018 ====
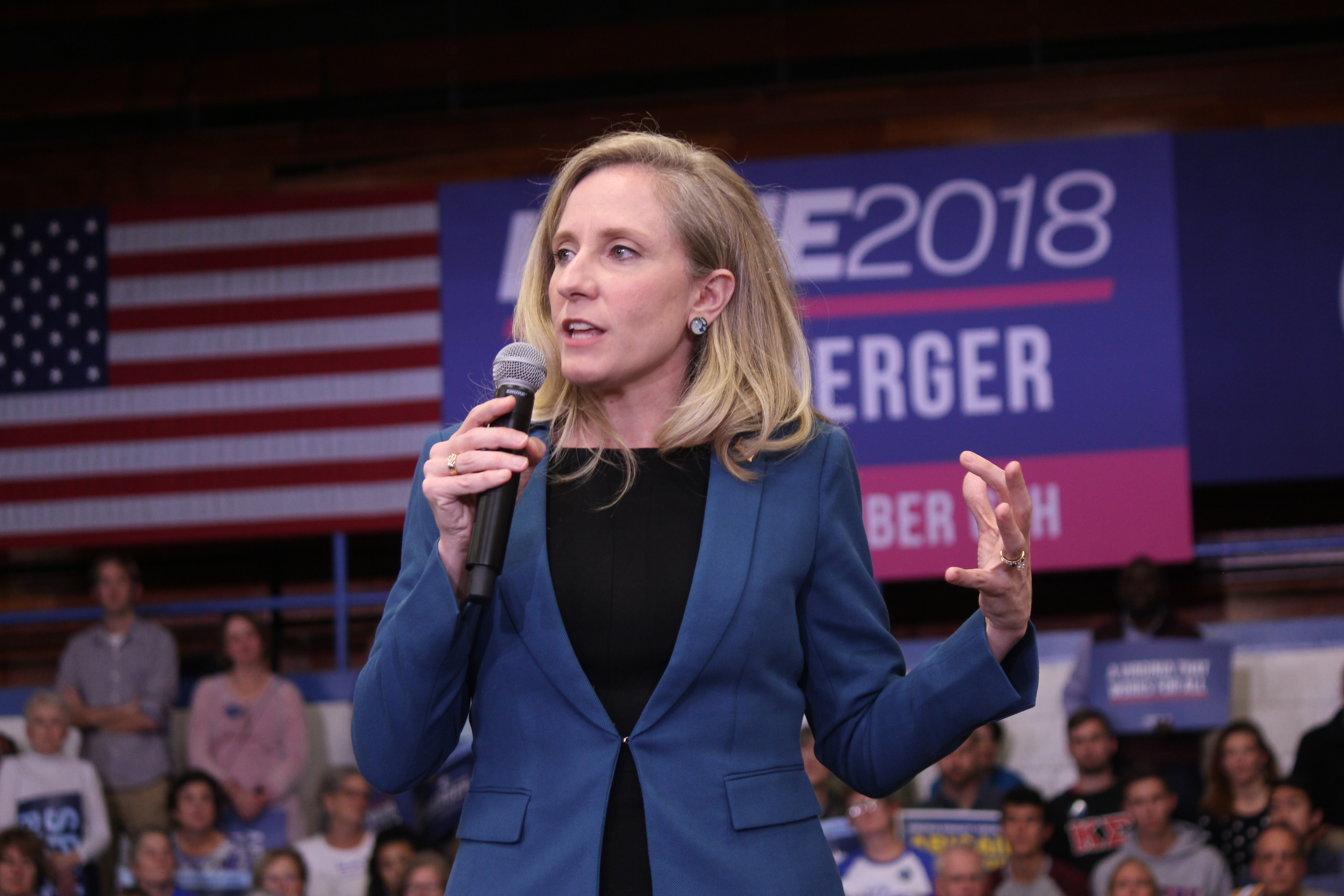
Spanberger speaking at a campaign rally on election day eve in 2018

In July 2017, Spanberger announced her candidacy for the United States House of Representatives in Virginia's 7th congressional district in the 2018 election against incumbent Republican Dave Brat, a former Tea Party movement member. She had begun to consider challenging Brat after attending a town hall meeting he hosted in Nottoway County in February 2017 and made the final decision to run in May after the House voted to repeal the Affordable Care Act, texting her husband, "I'm gonna run and I'm gonna f---ing win". On June 12, 2018, Spanberger defeated Dan Ward in the Democratic primary election with 73% of the vote, receiving more votes than any other candidate in the Virginia primaries that day.

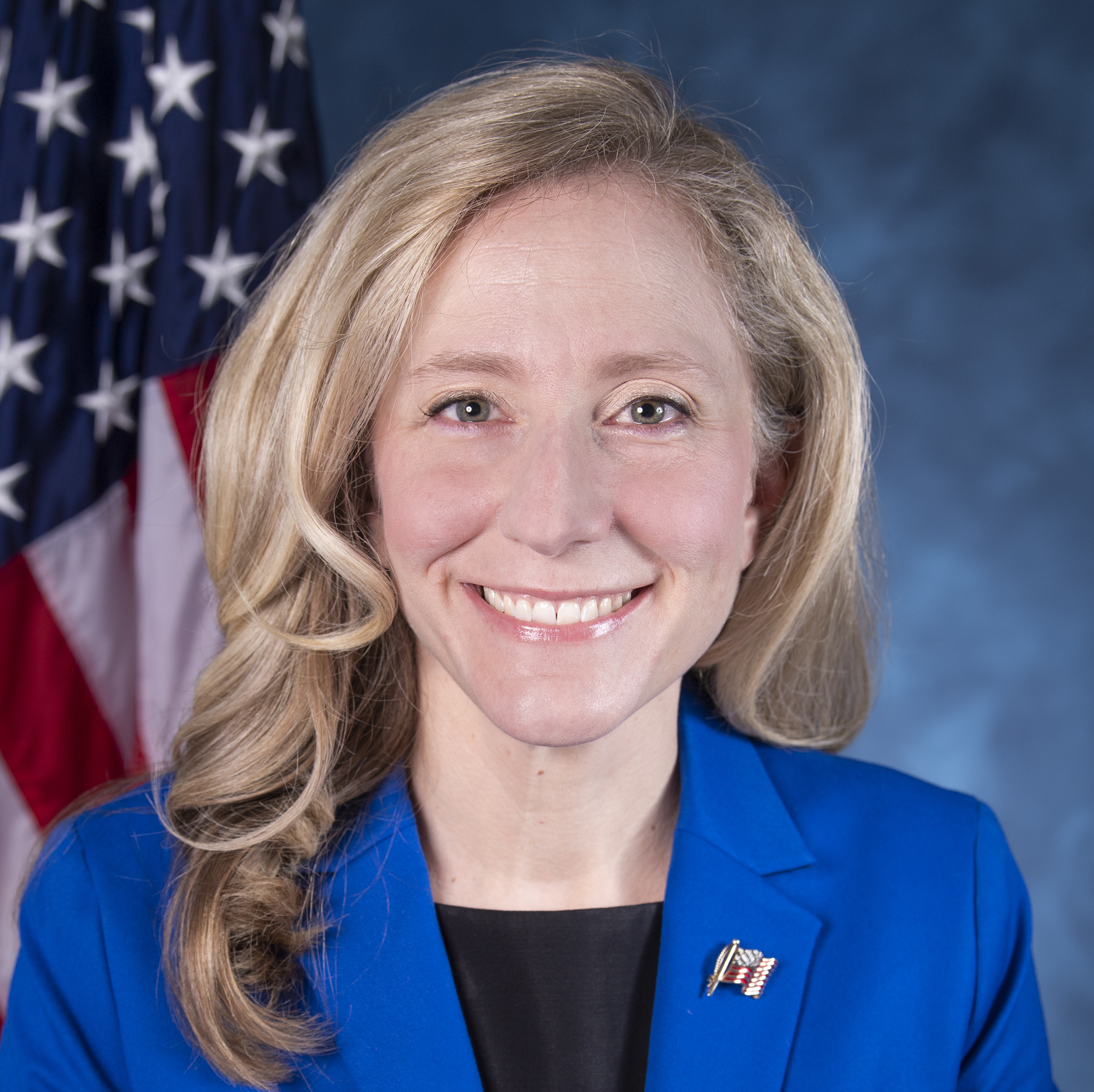
Spanberger during the 116th Congress

In August, the Congressional Leadership Fund, a super PAC closely aligned with Republican House Speaker Paul Ryan, conducted a smear campaign against Spanberger. The campaign, which attempted to tie her to terrorism, was based on an SF-86 application she completed to obtain security clearance, which was released in breach of privacy rules. In a visit to the district, former Trump adviser Steve Bannon called the race "an absolute bellwether of the entire country" and said that losing it would mean Republican loss of control of the House.

Spanberger won the November 6 general election by about 6,800 votes. Brat won eight of the district's ten counties, but Spanberger dominated the two largest counties, Henrico and Chesterfield, by a combined margin of over 30,000 votes. Her campaign outraised Brat's, with $5.8 million (equivalent to $7,556,994 in 2025) to his $2.1 million (equivalent to $2,723,398 in 2025). After winning the election, Virginia Supreme Court Justice Mims wrote her a letter extolling the virtues of public service, leadership, and civility, alongside a copy of former Czech President Václav Havel's essay "Politics, Morality, and Civility". Spanberger has said the letter and its impact on her leadership were crucial to her development as a politician.

Spanberger was the first Democrat to win this seat since 1970, when four-term Democrat John Marsh retired and was succeeded by Republican J. Kenneth Robinson. But until 1993, the 7th stretched from the outer Washington suburbs through the Shenandoah Valley and Charlottesville to the outer Richmond suburbs; the present 7th is geographically and demographically the successor to what was the 3rd district before 1993. That district had been in Republican hands since 1981; former House majority leader Eric Cantor represented it from 2001 until Brat ousted him in the 2014 Republican primary.

Spanberger and her colleagues Elissa Slotkin and Mikie Sherrill were described as the "mod squad", a moderate alternative to the progressive "squad". Spanberger and Sherrill shared a Capitol Hill apartment for four years while they served in Congress together.

==== 2020 ====
Spanberger faced a close reelection contest against Virginia delegate Nick Freitas, who represented much of the congressional district's northern portion. She won with 51% of the vote to Freitas's 49%. Freitas carried eight of the district's ten counties, as Brat had done two years earlier, but Spanberger prevailed by winning the district's shares of Henrico and Chesterfield counties by a combined 43,400 votes, five times her overall margin of 8,400 votes. She was also boosted by Joe Biden narrowly carrying the district; Biden was the first Democrat to win what is now the 7th Congressional District since 1948.

On November 5, days after winning reelection by a margin of 1.8%, Spanberger criticized the Democratic Party's strategy for the 2020 elections in a phone call with other Democratic caucus members that was subsequently leaked. Calling the elections "a failure" from a congressional standpoint, she singled out Republican attack ads decrying "socialism" and the movement to "defund the police" as prime reasons the Democratic Party lost seats in swing districts. Spanberger argued that Democrats should watch Republican ads before deciding how to talk about issues and never "use the word 'socialist' or 'socialism' ever again".

After the 2020 elections, Spanberger criticized Democratic messaging, arguing that progressive slogans such as "defund the police" and "socialism" had hurt candidates in swing districts. CNN political editor Chris Cillizza called her comments "hard truth" for the Democratic Party, adding that for Democrats to succeed in the 2022 and 2024 elections, they should "listen to the likes of Spanberger" rather than push for "the boldest possible progressive legislation".

==== 2022 ====
For her first two terms, Spanberger represented a district that stretched from the Richmond suburbs to the fringes of the Shenandoah Valley. After the 2020 United States redistricting cycle, Spanberger's district was radically redrawn, and no longer included her home in Henrico County. She considered not running for reelection in the new district before deciding to do so. Spanberger was seen as one of the most vulnerable incumbents of the 2022 election cycle, with pre-election polls projecting a close race with Republican Prince William County supervisor Yesli Vega, a law enforcement officer endorsed by Governor Glenn Youngkin and former president Donald Trump. Spanberger defeated Vega, 52% to 48%, the largest margin at the time in any election Spanberger had run in.

=== Tenure ===
==== Trump administration ====
According to FiveThirtyEight's congressional vote tracker, Spanberger voted with President Trump 8.7% of the time. In the 2016 presidential election, Trump won 50% of the vote to Hillary Clinton's 44% in Spanberger's future congressional district.

On September 23, 2019, Spanberger joined six other freshman House Democrats with national security backgrounds in calling for an impeachment inquiry into Trump. They co-wrote a Washington Post opinion piece explaining their support for an impeachment inquiry, writing: "Congress must determine whether the president was indeed willing to use his power and withhold security assistance funds to persuade a foreign country to assist him in an upcoming election." They wrote that, if the allegations were true, they amounted to a "flagrant disregard for the law" and a "threat to all we have sworn to protect". Spanberger later announced that she would vote in favor of impeachment, saying, "The President's actions violate his oath of office, endanger our national security, and betray the public trust".

On June 1, 2020, Spanberger tweeted criticism of Trump's reaction to the George Floyd protests, a series of protests against police brutality that began in Minneapolis on May 26. On June 2, The Washington Post and The New York Times quoted Spanberger and several other high-profile former CIA analysts' interpretations of Trump's reaction to the protests as reminiscent of the reaction of totalitarian dictators on the brink of losing control of their dictatorships. "As a former CIA officer, I know this playbook, and I know the president's actions are betraying the very foundation of the rule of law he purports to support, the U.S. Constitution", she said. Spanberger criticized Trump after police used tear gas and rubber bullets on peaceful protestors and a priest during the George Floyd protests to clear a path so that he could have a photo op in front of St. John's Episcopal Church.

Spanberger opposed Democrats' attempts to amend the Insurrection Act of 1807, saying that amending the rarely used law would not accomplish what Democrats intended.

==== Biden administration ====
According to PolitiFact, Spanberger publicly disagreed with some of Biden's immigration policies that have not been subject to congressional votes, but she voted for all 73 bills and resolutions in the House of Representatives that Biden voiced support for. In a November 2021 interview with the New York Times, Spanberger criticized Biden after the 2021 Virginia gubernatorial election, saying, "Nobody elected him to be F.D.R.; they elected him to be normal and stop the chaos." She also said the Democrats had not sufficiently recognized that inflation was problematic. In December 2023, she was one of six House Democrats to send Biden a letter criticizing Israeli Prime Minister Benjamin Netanyahu's Gaza military strategy.

=== Committee assignments ===
Spanberger's committee assignments included:

- Committee on Agriculture
  - Subcommittee on Commodity Exchanges, Energy, and Credit
  - Subcommittee on Conservation and Forestry (Chair)
- Committee on Foreign Affairs
  - Subcommittee on Asia, the Pacific and Nonproliferation
  - Subcommittee on Europe, Eurasia, Energy, and the Environment

=== Caucus memberships ===
- LGBT Equality Caucus
- New Democrat Coalition
- Problem Solvers Caucus
- Congressional Armenian Caucus
- Congressional Caucus for the Equal Rights Amendment
- Rare Disease Caucus

== 2025 gubernatorial election ==
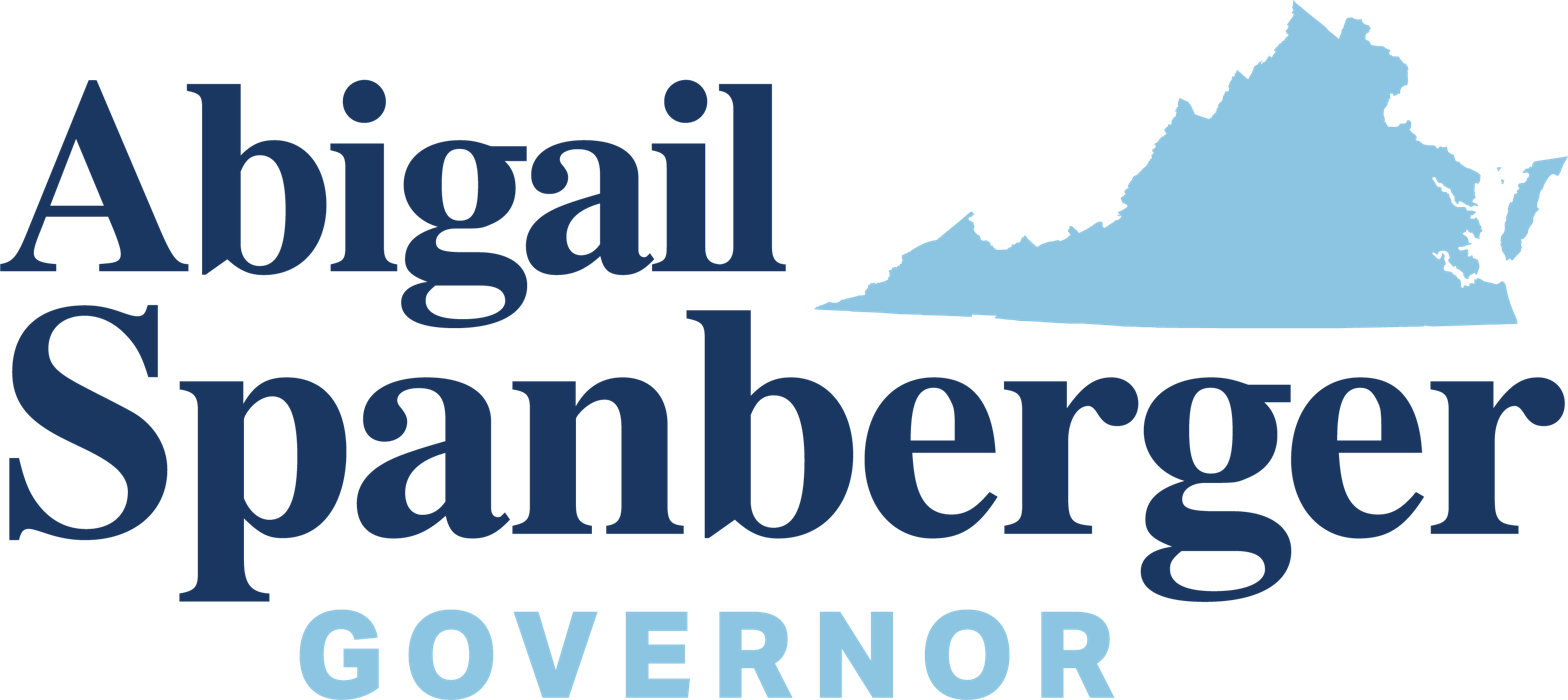
Spanberger's gubernatorial campaign logo

Map of the results of the 2025 Virginia gubernatorial election

In 2020, during a meeting with then-Governor of Virginia Ralph Northam, Northam suggested she should run for governor someday. Spanberger took his advice, and in November 2023 announced that she would not seek reelection to Congress and would instead run for governor of Virginia in the 2025 election. She secured the uncontested nomination in April 2025.

In May 2025, while campaigning, Spanberger said she would not sign a bill to fully repeal Virginia's right-to-work law if elected governor.

Spanberger is one of the few Virginia gubernatorial candidates to refuse money from Dominion Energy, instead getting donations from the anti-Dominion watchdog Clean Virginia alongside her running mates, who defeated Dominion-backed candidates. Her priorities on immigration include scrapping Youngkin's immigration order allowing local police to help carry out Trump's ICE raids and deportation policy. She supports rejoining the Regional Greenhouse Gas Initiative, which Youngkin, a Republican, left after Northam had joined it.

Spanberger was elected in a landslide, securing 58% of the vote. The Republican nominee, incumbent lieutenant governor Winsome Earle-Sears, received 42%. It was the largest margin of victory for a Democratic gubernatorial candidate in Virginia since Albertis Harrison received just under 64% of the vote in 1961. The official vote margin was over 527,000. While Democrats won the three statewide races in Virginia in 2025, Spanberger's 15-point margin of victory was the largest. Spanberger outperformed Kamala Harris in the 2024 presidential election in the state by nearly 10 percentage points, while winning 99% of Harris's voters.

== Governor of Virginia (2026–present) ==
=== Transition ===
On November 5, Spanberger announced her transition team, which included Chris Lu, Daun Hester, and Yohannes Abraham. Honorary co-chairs of the team included many Democratic Party of Virginia leaders, such as Louise Lucas, Don Scott, Jennifer Wexton, and Rick Boucher. Spanberger's transition informally began on November 6 with a lunch with Governor Youngkin. On November 12, Spanberger asked the University of Virginia's board of visitors to pause its search for a new president until her transition was complete, drawing criticism from both Youngkin and conservative alumni of the university for supposed politicization of the board process. Spanberger said Youngkin had done the same during his tenure, and promised structural reform to prevent it. Spanberger made her first cabinet appointment on December 2, announcing Marvin Figueroa as Secretary of Health and Human Resources, and continued to make appointments throughout the month.

=== Inauguration ===
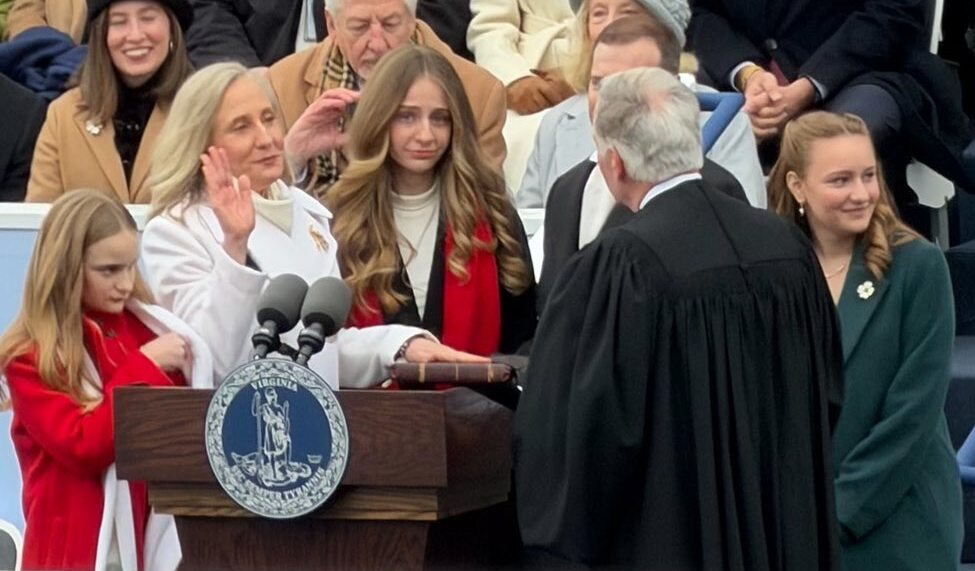
Spanberger being sworn in as Governor alongside her family

Spanberger was sworn in as governor on January 17, 2026. She was sworn in by former Supreme Court of Virginia Justice William C. Mims, with her husband Adam holding the Bible and her daughters by her side.

=== Tenure ===
==== Cabinet ====
The Spanberger Cabinet
Office	Name	Term
Governor	Abigail D. Spanberger	2026–present
Lieutenant Governor	Ghazala Hashmi	2026–present
Secretary of the Commonwealth	Candi Mundon King	2026–present
Chief of Staff for the Governor	Bonnie Krenz-Schnurman	2026-present
Secretary of Administration	Traci Deshazor	2026–present
Secretary of Agriculture and Forestry	Katie K. Frazier	2026–present
Secretary of Commerce and Trade	Carrie H. Chenery	2026–present
Secretary of Education	Jeffrey O. Smith	2026–present
Secretary of Health and Human Resources	Marvin Figueroa	2026–present
Secretary of Finance	Mark D. Sickles	2026–present
Secretary of Labor	Jessica K. Looman	2026–present
Secretary of Natural and Historic Resources	David L. Bulova	2026–present
Secretary of Public Safety and Homeland Security	Stanley M. Meador	2026–present
Secretary of Transportation	Nick M. Donohue	2026–present
Secretary of Veterans and Defense Affairs	Timothy P. Williams	2026–present
Chief Diversity Officer	Sesha Joi Moon	2026–present
Chief Energy Officer	Josephus Allmond	2026–present
Counsel to the Governor	Matt McGuire	2026–present

==== First days and executive actions ====
On January 17, 2026, her first day in office, Spanberger signed ten executive orders focusing primarily on affordability, healthcare, housing, education, and preparedness for potential federal policy changes under the Trump administration. Key orders included a statewide affordability directive requiring agencies to identify cost-reduction measures; establishment of task forces on health financing and economic resiliency amid federal cuts; a review of housing regulations and creation of a housing production commission; directives strengthening public education and inclusive practices; a review of university board appointment processes; expanded authority for the chief of staff; a non-discrimination and equal opportunity policy with affirmative recruitment measures; and rescission of former Governor Glenn Youngkin's Executive Order 47 requiring state and local law enforcement cooperation with federal civil immigration enforcement. Democrats praised the orders as delivering on campaign promises to lower costs and protect vulnerable populations, while Republicans criticized several as reversing effective Youngkin-era policies on immigration enforcement and merit-based education, and expressed concerns over the promotion of diversity initiatives and delegation of broad emergency powers.

One of Spanberger's first challenges as governor was managing the January 2026 North American winter storm, responsible for the deaths of four people and hundreds of traffic accidents. On January 22, she issued a state of emergency ordinance, mobilizing the Virginia Department of Emergency Management to work with state agencies, local governments, and private-sector partners to ensure preparedness during the winter storm, and promulgated guidelines for Virginians so that they could remain safe.

On January 30, Spanberger described the Virginia Leaders in Export Trade (VALET) program, promoting free trade in opposition to Trump's tariffs. The Virginia Port Authority is a major hub of international trade.

==== Address to the General Assembly ====
On January 19, 2026, Spanberger delivered her first address to a joint session of the Virginia General Assembly, emphasizing affordability, bipartisanship, and pragmatic solutions. She committed to reentering the Regional Greenhouse Gas Initiative (RGGI), maintaining Virginia's right-to-work law, collaborating with the federal government where possible, and pushing back against policies harming Virginia jobs or families. She outlined legislative priorities including lowering healthcare and energy costs, protecting renters, expanding housing production, supporting agriculture amid tariffs, implementing pro-worker measures such as paid family leave and a higher minimum wage, and bipartisan gun safety bills. Republicans welcomed the calls for unity and right-to-work commitment but proposed alternative tax relief measures and cautioned against increased spending.

==== Notable early legislation ====
In the opening days of the 2026 legislative session, the Democratic-controlled General Assembly advanced a proposed constitutional amendment to enshrine reproductive rights—including abortion, contraception, and fertility treatments—in the Virginia Constitution, passing it on party-line votes for consideration on the November 2026 ballot. Spanberger, who campaigned in support of these amendments, said she would campaign for their passage.

==== "Affordable Virginia Agenda" ====
On December 18, 2025, Spanberger announced her legislative priorities, the "Affordable Virginia Agenda", to reduce Virginians' cost of living by lowering the costs of prescription drugs, reining in pharmaceutical companies and price gouging, increasing access to medical services in rural areas, improving healthcare price transparency, limiting prior authorizations for care, bolstering renter protections, boosting the supply of mixed-income housing, streamlining the process by which the state finances affordable housing projects, lifting certain zoning and permitting restrictions, increasing the state's local energy generation, and expanding energy storage infrastructure to better satisfy the energy loads at times of peak demand, among other proposals to reduce healthcare, housing, and energy costs.

In the 2026 legislative session, the Democratic-controlled General Assembly worked to pass the entirety of this agenda, including renter protections, an energy efficiency task force, carbon tax-funded energy bill relief, child care employer/state cost sharing program to reduce costs for employees, regulations on the excess fees on premiums healthcare providers can charge for tobacco use, and allowing manufactured homes to be installed in any residential zoning district that allows the construction of traditional homes, except historic districts.

On March 30, 2026, the Assembly passed the Affordable Medicine Act, which makes the "maximum fair prices" for select prescription drugs negotiated by the Centers for Medicare and Medicaid under the Inflation Reduction Act for Medicare enrollees apply to the same drug purchases by Virginia-regulated health plans and state employee plans, while allowing ERISA-regulated plans the option to opt in. The Act created a Prescription Drug Affordability Advisory Panel charged with developing policy recommendations and strategies to improve prescription drug affordability, and pharmacy benefit managers are required to report administrative fees, formulary management fees, rebate retention, and network access fees to the Panel.

Effective July 1, 2026, HB1214 reduces the price cap for a 30-day supply of insulin from $50 to $35, irrespective of the amount of insulin or its type, and sets an aggregate cost-sharing cap of $35 for a 30-day supply of diabetes equipment and supplies, including blood glucose meters and strips, continuous glucose monitors and supplies, and insulin pump supplies. SB669 prohibits pharmacy benefit managers from charging "unreasonable" fees for processing electronic claims, reversing claims without prior written notice or just cause, unfairly retaliating against pharmacies for exercising various rights guaranteed by law, and reducing payments to pharmacies to effective reimbursement rates not agreed to in a provider agreement. It builds upon a law preventing PBMs from engaging in "spread pricing", which increases the cost of prescription drugs, by ordering them to use a "pass-through" pricing model, and directs them to give 100% of rebates received from their associated drug manufacturers to the carrier, plan, or covered person to reduce deductibles, co-payments, coinsurance, or other cost-sharing amounts. HB736 limits prior authorizations for prescription medication that can lead to costly delays in care.

SB74 extends the state affordable housing program to all county-level jurisdictions and independent cities, and authorizes local authorities to ease single-family zoning and permit the construction of new duplexes, triplexes, and quadruplexes, allow the construction of accessory dwelling units, allow the conversion of office, light industrial, and commercial space to multi-family housing, encourage transit-oriented development, lower minimum lot sizes, and administer incentives/retract disincentives to spur affordable housing developments in areas where development would otherwise never happen, to increase housing density and supply to address the state's housing shortage and reduce prices. HB352 allows localities to incentivize affordable housing construction through a performance-based grant system, while HB594 allows local zoning administrators to expedite rezoning applications for housing developments consisting 75% of housing units affordable for households with incomes at or below the area median income, and allows the Department of Housing and Community Development to give localities priority for grants and loans issued therefrom for these projects.

On April 30, 2026, the Faith in Housing Act was signed into law. It eliminates the rezoning step for faith-based organizations and other tax-exempt nonprofits to develop affordable housing on their properties, allowing religious organizations to give their communities affordable housing with fewer regulatory restrictions.

To aggregate the state's distributed energy generation and storage resources into a centralized system, increasing the grid's reliability, flexibility, and cost efficiency, HB1467 and HB562 expand Virginia's virtual power plant pilot program, which previously had directed only Dominion Energy to participate, to include Appalachian Power and electric utility cooperatives. HB284/SB371 direct power utilities to establish a voluntary demand flexibility program for high-load energy users such as data centers, and incentivize reductions in energy use during times of high demand and offloading energy use to lower-demand periods to lower bills for all other ratepayers, alongside reducing the need to construct new, expensive power plants and attenuating grid stress at peak demand. SB377 allows utilities to cooperate with high-load energy users to build new substations that exclusively serve them, at the expense of the energy user, to shield other ratepayers from increased costs incurred by their intensive consumption.

The Fair and Affordable Electric Rates and Reliability Act extended Dominion Energy and Appalachian Power's weatherization and bill assistance programs for low-income, elderly and disabled customers, and capped ratepayer costs to fund Dominion's electric line undergrounding program at 4% of the rate base. Spanberger returned the bill to the legislature with amendments on April 13, 2026. One amendment modified the language of a provision that directed the State Corporation Commission to discretionarily approve or deny measures to prevent certain high-load customers of 25 megawatts or greater from shifting the cost of new electricity distribution infrastructure onto other ratepayers with more stringent language to "take all measures" to reasonably ensure that other ratepayers are not subsidizing costs associated with this energy usage with rate hikes. Another amendment removed an exemption for high-load projects approved before July 1, 2026. The General Assembly accepted these amendments while rejecting a number of other amendments to the bill.

==== Energy and environment ====
Shortly after taking office in January 2026, Spanberger reiterated a pledge and long-term policy goal of the state Democratic Party to rejoin the Regional Greenhouse Gas Initiative in her first address to the General Assembly. A provision of a budget bill passed in late February directed state agencies to repeal the RGGI exit regulation and reinstate the previous framework governing its participation by June 2026, while HB397 amends state law to clarify a statutory requirement compelling the state to participate in the interstate cap-and-trade program.

In March 2026, Spanberger hosted the 2026 Governor's Environmental Excellence Awards, where she discussed the importance of responsible stewardship of the environment and announced award winners across eleven conservancy groups for their actions in preserving and protecting the state's natural resources and population from harmful development and disasters. On April 8, she signed into law HB507, which prohibits the Virginia Department of Environmental Quality from issuing air permits to data centers with backup diesel gen-sets that do not satisfy the Environmental Protection Agency's tier 4 emission standards.

On April 22, to commemorate Earth Day, Spanberger signed an executive order committing Virginia to the United States Climate Alliance, a bipartisan coalition of governors committed to sustaining America's fight against climate change with state-led action. In May, she signed a slate of legislation aimed at preserving the state's natural resources and treating drinking water for PFAS compounds.

During her campaign, Spanberger committed to expanding the state's solar and wind energy capacity. In office, she has worked to promote nuclear power and novel innovations such as next-generation nuclear reactors and nuclear fusion, but she has acknowledged the need to continue to invest into natural gas power generation to preserve the cost of living for ratepayers and meet the state's short-term energy needs.

In April 2026, Spanberger signed HB590, which establishes an Internet-based "Smart Solar Permitting Platform", set to launch on July 1, 2027, that automates plan review and automatically issues permits to the construction of residential solar installations that comply with the Uniform Statewide Building Code and other applicable state laws in order to streamline the regulatory approval process. She also signed HB395, which prohibits landlords with more than four housing units and local governments preventing tenants from installing plug-in solar devices, and prevents investor-owned or municipal utilities and electric cooperatives from imposing interconnection requirements, charging any fee related to the device, or requiring that customers obtain the utility's approval before installing or using the device, allowing apartment residents to generate their own solar power. The bipartisan Distributed Generation Expansion Act, also signed in April, increases Virginia's solar potential by expanding the distributed generation carveout of the Virginia Clean Economy Act from 1% to 4.5% from 2026 to 2030 compliance years, then 5% from 2031 to 2045 compliance years, boosting the development of residential and distributed solar.

On March 25, Spanberger created the cabinet-level position of Chief Energy Officer via executive order, appointing Southern Environmental Law Center attorney Josephus Allmond to the position. The office is tasked with cooperating with the Virginia Secretary of Commerce and Trade, the Virginia Department of Energy, PJM Interconnection, and energy utility providers to address rising energy costs, expand clean energy generation, and develop a statewide energy strategy.

On April 9, Spanberger signed a bill instructing the Department of Energy to identify and develop training resources and curricula to expand the workforce allocated to projects relating to the offshore wind industry, prioritizing training for veterans, local workers, and people from historically economically disadvantaged communities. She later signed HB1444, formally codifying the Clean Energy Innovation Bank that had been trialed by the Virginia Department of Energy in 2024, which financed clean energy projects, greenhouse gas emissions reduction projects, and other similar projects.

==== Immigration ====
On her first day in office, Spanberger signed the rescission of an executive order issued by Glenn Youngkin directing local and state law enforcement agencies to enter 287(g) memoranda of agreement with United States Immigration and Customs Enforcement, deputizing federal immigration law enforcement authority to local officers. The rescission order does not force local departments to exit existing agreements with ICE. Nevertheless, the order has been criticized by Republicans and ICE officials, who have called it a "sanctuary state" policy that has led to an increase in immigrant crime.

On May 20, 2026, Spanberger signed into law HB1482, which makes it a class 1 misdemeanor for ICE officers to wear facial coverings or mask except to protect them from infection or ingesting toxic substances, and directs the Department of Criminal Justice Services to develop a model policy for and restrictions on the use of facial coverings by law-enforcement officers, while noting that only 30% of people held in ICE detention centers in Virginia have criminal backgrounds. At the same time, she vetoed a law that would have prevented ICE from conducting civil arrests at courthouses, schools, and healthcare facilities.

Spanberger simultaneously issued Executive Order 16, which directs state-level executive branch agencies to ascertain that federal immigration law enforcement officers entering, accessing, or using nonpublic areas possess a valid warrant authorizing their access to these properties; prevents federal immigration officers from using those properties as a staging area, processing location, or operations base for law enforcement; and provides guidance for courtroom, education, health and election officials in engaging with immigration officers in order to curtail attempts to intimidate citizens of Virginia.

==== Reproductive rights ====
The Virginia House of Delegates voted to approve an amendment enshrining abortion access for all Virginia citizens shortly before Spanberger took office. The Senate followed suit shortly thereafter. Spanberger signed the bill and sent it to the voters for final approval on February 6, 2026. If passed by voters, the measure will amend the state constitution to provide that "every individual has the fundamental right to reproductive freedom and that such right shall not be, directly or indirectly, denied, burdened, or infringed upon."

On April 8, Spanberger signed the Right to Contraception Act, enshrining Virginians' right to obtain and use contraceptive drugs or devices and healthcare providers' right to provide them. On April 22, she signed the Contraception Equity Act, which requires that health insurers cover the cost of Food and Drug Administration-approved contraceptive drugs or devices on an outpatient basis, prohibits them from imposing copayments or other cost-sharing fees onto the insured except in certain circumstances, and requires that any insurance plan provide point-of-sale coverage without cost-sharing at in-network pharmacies for hormonal contraceptives available over the counter.

==== Labor and employment ====
On April 6, 2026, Spanberger signed into law HB1, which would increase the state's hourly minimum wage from $12.77 to $13.75 by January 1, 2027, and $15 by 2028; thereafter the minimum wage will be indexed to increases in the consumer price index and hiked incrementally every year. Two days later, she signed HB20, which rescinded a statutory exemption from the state minimum wage law for farm laborers and employees, which would go into effect on January 1, 2027.

Also on April 6, Spanberger signed SB149, which expands Virginia's state-run individual retirement savings program, RetirePath, to an estimated 357,000 private-sector workers employed by businesses that do not offer qualified workplace retirement plans by lowering the full-time or part-time business employment minimum for enrollment in the program to five employees from 25. The law also drops the requirement that employees work at least 30 hours weekly. Contemporaneously, Spanberger signed a bill expanding workers compensation for first responders experiencing post-traumatic stress disorder.

In April 2026, Spanberger also signed laws heavily restricting non-compete agreements, including SB170, which makes non-compete agreements unenforceable if an employee is fired "without cause" unless the employer provides severance benefits or another monetary payment, which must be disclosed upon the agreement's execution. On April 22, she signed the Equal Pay Act, which prohibits employers from asking prospective workers about their pay history and using that data in considering whether to hire them or in determining their salary unless they voluntarily provide their pay history. She also signed a bill that expands legal protections against wage theft.

On May 11, Spanberger signed a bill establishing a Paid Family and Medical Leave Insurance program administered by the Virginia Employment Commission, set to go into effect in 2028. It guarantees that employers pay at least $1,500 in wages per quarter; provide up to 12 weeks of paid family leave to enrolled employees to take care of a relative or a child or 12 weeks of safety service leave for victims or relatives of victims of domestic violence, harassment, sexual assault, or stalking; and replace at least 80% of the claimant's weekly wages, up to 100% of the statewide average weekly net earnings, or $1,507. The program is funded by a trust fund financed by remittances from employers deducted from employee payrolls and, for employers of more than ten workers, employer contributions.

On May 14, Spanberger vetoed SB378 and HB1263, collective bargaining legislation backed by the Virginia Service Employees International Union (SEIU) and various labor groups. The legislation would have granted state and municipal employees collective bargaining rights, and was supported by all of the state legislature's Democrats. Spanberger proposed amendments that would have weakened the legislation by permitting rather than requiring state agencies to bargain with workers, exempting the state's Port Authority and universities from bargaining, and delaying the law's implementation until the end of her term. When the General Assembly rejected these amendments, Spanberger vetoed the bills.

On May 20, Spanberger signed HB5, which mandates that private-sector employers and state and local governments give employees at least one hour of paid sick leave for every 30 hours worked, which is allowed to accrue to a maximum of 40 hours per year, unless the employer gives employees a more generous benefit. The law extends benefits to over 1.2 million uncovered workers.

On June 26, Spanberger signed legislation raising benefits for unemployment claims filed after July 5 of that year by 11.2%, from $430 to $478 per week.

==== Cannabis ====
HB542 was the state legislature's most recent effort to expand the commercial sale of recreational cannabis. It would have established a framework for the creation of a cannabis retail market administered and regulated by the Virginia Cannabis Control Authority and partially liberalized certain restrictions on sales quantities. Spanberger referred the bill back to the General Assembly with recommendations that would have delayed the retail market's launch by six months, increased civil penalties for illegal cannabis use to a class 4 misdemeanor, raised the excise tax on cannabis production to 8%, and reduced the number of cannabis dispensaries to be authorized by regulators to 200. The General Assembly rejected these recommendations.

As a result, Spanberger vetoed the bill on May 19, 2026, despite supporting the creation of a retail cannabis market as long as it had strong labeling and regulation. She cited the bill's "rushed timeframe", which she said gave the state too little time to design comprehensive strategies for regulating the market or to learn from the successes and errors of other states that liberalized cannabis retailing. Negotiations continued in the following weeks, and they reached a compromise on June 16.

Concurrently, Spanberger supported and signed legislation that strengthened cannabis users' parental rights by restricting authorities' power to infringe upon custody or visitation of a dependent child on the basis of cannabis possession, implementing protections for health professionals at hospices, nursing homes and assisted living facilities that aid terminally ill patients in using medical cannabis treatment from punishment, as well as a bill that reduces the sentences of people with cannabis use convictions for crimes that are no longer chargeable offenses under current law since the full legalization of cannabis use in 2021.

==== Gun control ====
On May 14, 2026, Spanberger signed an "assault weapons" ban, making it a class 1 misdemeanor to import, sell, manufacture, purchase, or transfer certain semi-automatic pistols, shotguns and high-capacity magazines after July 1, 2026, and defines penalties for breaching this law, with exceptions for law enforcement officers and members of the United States Armed Forces. Semi-automatic shotguns for hunting are not considered assault weapons, and semi-automatic firearms owned before July 1 may be retained. The law was subject to litigation immediately after being enacted.

In April, Spanberger signed bills strengthening regulations requiring firearms sellers to prevent the illegal distribution of weapons to arms traffickers, straw purchasers, or people forbidden from owning a gun under state or federal law; prohibiting the carry of firearms or explosive material on college campuses or in the vicinity of public educational institutions, with exemptions for Reserve Officers' Training Corps cadets, military personnel, and law enforcement; and raising the minimum age to purchase a gun to 21. She signed other restrictions relating to the possession of firearms in hospitals, the presence of polling places, and laws relating to gun owners' responsibility to keep their firearms secure.

==== Election integrity ====
On March 24, 2026, Spanberger issued an executive order authorizing Virginia's reentry into the Electronic Registration Information Center, a nonprofit, nonpartisan organization with 26 member states that share voter registration and identification data to better keep accurate voter rolls, from which Governor Youngkin withdrew the state in 2023. The executive order requires the Virginia Department of Motor Vehicles to coordinate with the Department of Elections to conduct thorough voter roll maintenance operations, prohibits the purge of ineligible voters from the rolls within 90 days of a primary or general election, requires local registrars to ascertain reported election results' integrity after each election, and directs the Commissioner of the Department of Elections to verify that ballot chain of custody procedures are followed and voting equipment is certified according to federal standards, properly tested before each election, and never connected to the Internet.

==== 2026 Virginia redistricting amendment ====
Until 2020, the General Assembly was responsible for delineating the boundaries of congressional districts, but this process was amended by a ballot measure approved by voters on November 3, 2020, which referred redistricting authority from the state legislature to a bipartisan redistricting commission staffed by eight legislators and eight citizens and tied the redistricting process to the decennial census. Bypassing the commission would require another amendment to the Constitution of Virginia. The General Assembly can pass amendments through a majority vote by the House of Delegates and the Senate in two consecutive legislative sessions, which would send the amendment to be approved by the voters as a ballot measure.

Despite Spanberger's August 2025 pledge to make no attempt to redraw Virginia's congressional map if elected, in late October state Democratic leaders announced a plan to redraw the state's map through a constitutional amendment that would temporarily suspend the bipartisan commission's authority to permit a one-time mid-decade redistricting session, which she said she would not oppose. A corresponding resolution was adopted by the Assembly in October that allows the Virginia General Assembly to consider constitutional amendments related to redistricting during a special session, which was agreed to by the House on the 29th and by the Senate on the 31st. Both floors reapproved the amendment after the beginning of 164th General Assembly, and Spanberger signed the legislation that sent it to the voters.

The amendment was ultimately approved, 51.69% to 48.31%. It was struck down by the Supreme Court of Virginia on May 8, a ruling appealed by state Democrats. The U.S. Supreme Court rejected the appeal on May 15.

==== Other actions ====
On February 24, 2026, Spanberger delivered the Democratic response to Trump's 2026 State of the Union Address from the chamber of the House of Burgesses in the reconstructed Capitol in Williamsburg, Virginia. In February 2026, Spanberger signed legislation sending three constitutional amendments to voters for referendums later in 2026: again, the Right to Reproductive Freedom Amendment, enshrining reproductive rights, the Repeal Same-Sex Marriage Ban Amendment, which rescinds the longstanding state same-sex marriage ban that will go into effect if Obergefell v. Hodges is overturned, and the Voting Rights Restoration Amendment, which restores voting rights to formerly incarcerated people who completed felony sentences.

On March 9, 2026, her 50th day in office, Spanberger highlighted $575 million in new business investments (including the second-largest economic development deal in Southern Virginia history, creating nearly 2,000 jobs), progress on lowering costs through the Affordable Virginia Agenda and day-one executive orders, and the launch of a cross-Commonwealth school listening tour.

The 2026 legislative session concluded on March 14 with sine die adjournment without a final biennial budget agreement, due to a dispute over data center tax exemptions.

In early April, Spanberger signed bipartisan legislation establishing a High School Certified Nurse Aide Training and Certification Program, administered by the Board of Education and Virginia Board of Nursing for the purpose of creating a pathway for qualified high school students to prepare for and obtain certification as a certified nurse aide; allowing high school students to serve in an apprenticeship program relating to the culinary arts or information technology; a schoolground cellphone ban; and a bill that codifies and expands statewide the Roanoke Community Builders Pilot Program that seeks to reduce youth violence by providing educational opportunities for secondary-school-aged children.

In April 2026, Spanberger signed a bill that eliminates tax breaks for organizations related to the Confederate States of America, and a package of legislation relating to maternal healthcare and telemedicine. Other major bills passed and sent to Spanberger's desk include the legalization of adult-use cannabis sales (effective January 1, 2027), regulation of "skill" games, authorization of collective bargaining for public employees, and a sweeping gun-safety package (including an assault weapons ban, large-capacity magazine restrictions, and expanded industry liability). Most bills would take effect on July 1, 2026.

In July 2026, Spanberger ended a rulemaking process that would have continued the process of banning transgender women from competing in women's sports in Virginia and entering certain female restrooms and locker rooms.

=== Public image ===
Very early in Spanberger's governorship, opinion polls showed that her job approval rating was fairly stable and similar to the average of previous Virginia governors. A poll by the Institute for Policy and Opinion Research at Roanoke College in early February showed that 53% of Virginians gave her high marks for her job performance, while 38% disapproved.

By April, her approval rating had dropped significantly, with a Washington Post–Schar School poll finding that 47% of voters approved of Spanberger and 46% disapproved. This marked the worst net approval rating for a governor in the early months of their term in Washington Post polls since the early 1990s. Similarly, a State Navigate poll conducted on April 10–13 showed her net approval rating to be breaking even. But after the 2026 Virginia redistricting amendment, a Public Sentiment Institute poll found that 52% of voters approved of Spanberger and 41% disapproved, as in earlier polls. Her net approval rating fell back to -2% by July, according to a poll by Virginia Commonwealth University.

In June 2026, Vox described Spanberger as polarizing, attempting to placate both businesses and Democrats, while being viewed negatively by Republicans.

== Political positions ==
Spanberger positions herself as a moderate Democrat and has called herself a "passionate pragmatist". Virginia NPR affiliate WCVE-FM called Spanberger's legislative voting record "typical in this highly partisan era" and said she has always voted for Biden's agenda while still being the fifth-most bipartisan House member when it came to cosponsoring legislation and opposing one of Biden's executive orders on immigration. In the 2019 speaker of the United States House of Representatives election on the opening day of the 116th United States Congress, Spanberger voted for Representative Cheri Bustos, an Illinois Democrat, joining 11 other Democrats who did not back Nancy Pelosi.

=== Abortion ===
Spanberger supports abortion rights. She opposed the U.S. Supreme Court's decision in Dobbs v. Jackson Women's Health Organization, overturning the right to abortion established by Roe v. Wade, saying that "it undermines the right to privacy and a woman's right to choose". She opposes legislation to restrict abortion, saying that the government should not "mandate a pregnancy". During her gubernatorial campaign, Spanberger said she would support a constitutional amendment to restore "the Roe standard" and that she supported Virginia's existing laws requiring minors seeking abortions to receive parental consent, and certain limitations on third-trimester abortions.

=== COVID-19 ===
In February 2023, Spanberger was one of 12 House Democrats who voted in favor of H.J. Res. 7, a Republican-sponsored resolution to terminate the national emergency concerning COVID-19 declared in March 2020.

During her 2025 campaign for governor of Virginia, a January 6, 2021, photograph of Spanberger wearing an emergency escape hood inside the Capitol was circulated online by critics, who misrepresented it as COVID-19 protective gear and mocked her. The hoods, which protect against smoke and chemical irritants, were distributed to members of Congress by Capitol Police during the attack on the Capitol; the misrepresentation was widely noted and debunked online, with some observers saying that the circulation of the image drew attention to the events of January 6.

=== Criminal justice ===
In 2023, Spanberger voted against overturning the District of Columbia's revision of its criminal code, which reduced the maximum penalties for burglary, carjacking, and robbery. Virginia Attorney General Jason Miyares said, "This is one of the most extreme criminal-first, victim-last measures we've seen across the nation."

Spanberger opposes defunding the police, and has supported bills that would increase the ability of local police departments to hire and train more officers.

=== Economy ===
Although she was not a member of Congress when it passed, Spanberger criticized the 2017 Tax Cuts and Jobs Act supported by President Donald Trump, arguing that its permanent tax cuts for corporations would increase the national debt.

Spanberger called for the passage of the USMCA trade deal negotiated by the Trump administration, Mexico, and Canada. Spanberger opposed Trump's tariffs during her 2025 gubernatorial campaign. She has promoted free trade during her tenure as governor.

In May 2020, Spanberger voted against the HEROES Act, a proposed $3 trillion stimulus package in response to the COVID-19 pandemic. She said the bill went "far beyond" pandemic relief and had no chance of passing the Republican-controlled Senate. In November 2020, Spanberger led a bipartisan effort to secure the 340B Drug Pricing Program against changes that would lead to significant increases in prescription medication costs.

Spanberger supports banning members of Congress from trading stocks. She has introduced legislation that would require lawmakers, as well as their spouses and dependent children, to place assets in a blind trust while in office.

In September 2025, Spanberger wrote an opinion article in The Washington Post opposing DOGE for conducting mass layoffs of federal workers in 2025 which particularly affect Virginia, as many federal workers live there. Spanberger focused her 2025 gubernatorial campaign on affordability and jobs.

=== Education ===
Through her "Strengthening Virginia Schools Plan", Spanberger announced she would make higher education more affordable and accessible and make it easier for high school students to take college-level courses. She supports allowing teachers to deliver instruction and manage curriculum without interference from political bodies or agendas. Spanberger has emphasized strengthening public schools by hiring and fairly compensating teachers, rather than supporting private schools and school choice. She also supports allowing schools to teach about Virginia's history of racism, saying, "history is important for us to learn from, for our kids to be proud of the progress we've made."

=== Environment ===
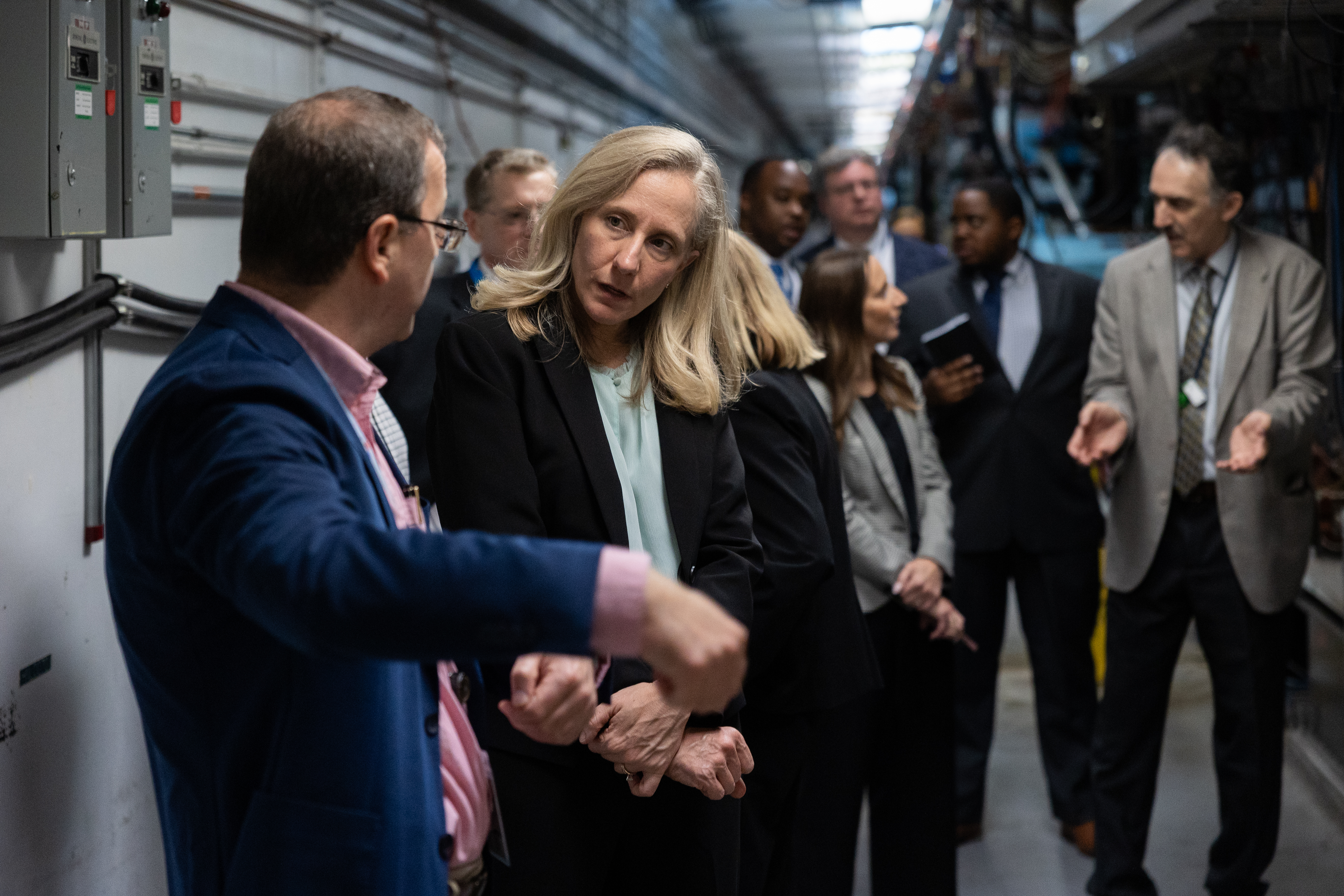
Director of Accelerator Operations Eduard Pozdeyev speaks with Congresswoman Abigail Spanberger, inside the CEBAF accelerator tunnel at Jefferson Lab in Newport News, Virginia in September 2024.

Spanberger has called climate change "one of the greatest and most imminent threats to our economy, our national security, and our way of life" and said she will "stand up to attacks against science". During a 2019 Committee on Foreign Affairs meeting, she asked the Trump administration to reverse its isolationist policies, saying, "it's in our national interest to reinforce our stature as a global leader on international environmental and energy issues".

Spanberger called the Green New Deal proposed by Alexandria Ocasio-Cortez a "bold compilation of ideas meant to address global climate change" but criticized it for allegedly including unrelated policy proposals and not identifying specific solutions to the problems it identifies, and said, "Overall, I am not a supporter of the Green New Deal".

=== Foreign affairs ===
In February 2023, during the Russo–Ukrainian War, Spanberger signed a letter advocating that President Biden give Ukraine F-16 fighter jets.

In June 2025, Spanberger supported the U.S. strikes on Iranian nuclear sites.

=== Gun control ===
Spanberger has called for a new version of the Federal Assault Weapons Ban that expired in 2004. She favors requiring background checks on private gun sales and supported a ban on bump stocks. Before she served in Congress, Spanberger volunteered with Moms Demand Action, a gun-control advocacy group.

=== Health care ===
Spanberger supports the Affordable Care Act (Obamacare). She supports a public option for healthcare via the proposed Medicare-X Choice Act. In November 2020, she called reducing the cost of prescription drugs "the top priority of families in my district".

In January 2020, Spanberger sponsored the Public Disclosure of Drug Discounts Act, which passed the House unanimously. The bill requires pharmacy benefit managers (PBMs), who manage prescription drug benefits for health insurance companies, to publicize the rebates, discounts, and price concessions they negotiate, via a website hosted by the U.S. secretary of health and human services. Spanberger also co-sponsored the Elijah Cummings Lower Drug Costs Now Act, which grants Medicare Part D the power to negotiate prescription prices directly with drug companies.

=== Immigration ===
Spanberger objected to President Trump's travel bans from certain predominantly Muslim countries and argued that they would aid jihadist propaganda by allowing a portrayal of the U.S. as an anti-Muslim country. She has voiced her support for stronger border security measures but opposes Trump's proposed wall. Spanberger voted for a bill that included funding for border infrastructure, technology at ports of entry, and more customs and border protection officers and agents. She said she does not support "sanctuary cities" but also called the term "a campaign slogan a lot of people get caught up in". She added that it "degrades the value of the conversation if we're not actually talking about what the real concern is." Spanberger called for a pathway to legal status for illegal immigrants who abide by the laws, work, and pay taxes.

Spanberger voted to allow U.S. Immigration and Customs Enforcement to be notified when undocumented immigrants attempt to purchase firearms.

=== LGBTQ rights ===
Spanberger supports same-sex marriage, saying in 2025, "All Virginians deserve the freedom to marry and for their families to be welcomed in our Commonwealth without the shadow of an outdated and unconstitutional ban on marriage equality lingering in Virginia's Constitution." In 2019, she voted in favor of the Equality Act, which has not yet become law. In 2022, she voted in favor of the Respect for Marriage Act.

When Spanberger ran for governor in 2025, she was endorsed by the Human Rights Campaign, an LGBTQ advocacy group.

== Personal life ==
In April 2006 she married Adam Spanberger, a University of Virginia-trained engineer, and her high school sweetheart. They have three daughters together. She helped run a Girl Scouts troop for her daughters when they were young.

In 2014, the family moved to Henrico County. Before Spanberger became governor, they lived in Glen Allen, Virginia.

Spanberger is a Protestant.

During her time in Congress, Spanberger roomed with colleague Mikie Sherrill, who was elected governor of New Jersey on the same day Spanberger was elected governor of Virginia.

== Electoral history ==
=== 2018 ===
2018 Virginia's 7th congressional district election
Primary election
Party	Candidate	Votes	%
Democratic	Abigail Spanberger	33,210	72.68
Democratic	Daniel Ward	12,483	27.32
Total votes		45,693	100.00
General election
Democratic	Abigail Spanberger	176,079	50.34
Republican	Dave Brat (incumbent)	169,295	48.40
Libertarian	Joe Walton	4,216	1.21
Write-in		213	0.06
Total votes		349,803	100.00
Democratic gain from Republican			

=== 2020 ===
2020 Virginia's 7th congressional district election
Party	Candidate	Votes	%
Democratic	Abigail Spanberger (incumbent)	230,893	50.82
Republican	Nick Freitas	222,623	49.00
Write-in		823	0.18
Total votes		454,339	100.00
Democratic hold			

=== 2022 ===
2022 Virginia's 7th congressional district election
Party	Candidate	Votes	%
Democratic	Abigail Spanberger (incumbent)	143,357	52.21
Republican	Yesli Vega	130,586	47.56
Write-in		647	0.24
Total votes		274,590	100.00
Democratic hold			

=== 2025 ===
2025 Virginia gubernatorial election
Party	Candidate	Votes	%
Democratic	Abigail Spanberger	1,976,857	57.58
Republican	Winsome Earle-Sears	1,449,586	42.22
Write-in		6,897	0.20
Total votes		3,433,340	100.00
Democratic gain from Republican			

== See also ==
- List of female governors in the United States
- Women in the United States House of Representatives

U.S. House of Representatives
Preceded by Dave Brat	Member of the U.S. House of Representatives from Virginia's 7th congressional district 2019–2025	Succeeded by Eugene Vindman
Party political offices
Preceded by Terry McAuliffe	Democratic nominee for Governor of Virginia; 2025	Most recent
Preceded by Elissa Slotkin	Response to the State of the Union address 2026	Most recent
Political offices
Preceded by Glenn Youngkin	Governor of Virginia; 2026–present	Incumbent
U.S. order of precedence (ceremonial)
Preceded by JD Vance as Vice President	Order of precedence of the United States; Within Virginia	Succeeded by Mayor of city in which event is held
Preceded by JD Vance as Vice President	Order of precedence of the United States; Within Virginia	Succeeded by Otherwise Mike Johnson as Speaker of the House
Preceded by Kelly Ayotte as Governor of New Hampshire	Order of precedence of the United States; Outside Virginia	Succeeded by Kathy Hochul as Governor of New York
