= King v. O'Bannon =

2026 Virginia court case

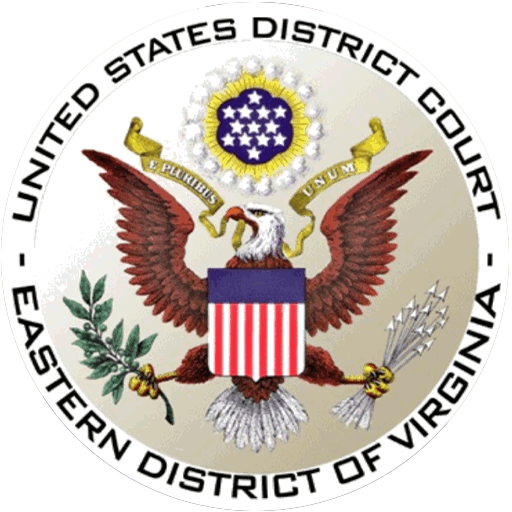
- Court: U.S. District Court for the Eastern District of Virginia
- Full case name: Tati Abu King, et al., vs John O'Bannon, in his official capacity as Chairman of the State Board of Elections for the Commonwealth of Virginia, et al.
- Decided: January 22, 2026
- Verdict: Sections of the Constitution of Virginia which automatically disenfranchise felons are in violation of the Virginia Readmission Act of 1870.

Case history
- Appealed to: U.S. Court of Appeals for the Fourth Circuit (remanded); Supreme Court of the United States (certiorari denied)

Court membership
- Judge sitting: John A. Gibney Jr.

Laws applied
- Virginia Readmission Act of 1870; Reconstruction Act of 1867

King v. O'Bannon, known prior to 2024 as King v. Youngkin, is a class-action lawsuit brought before the U.S. District Court for the Eastern District of Virginia concerning felony disenfranchisement in Virginia. Under the current (Note: An amendment modifying this section takes effect January 1, 2027.) Constitution of Virginia, voters convicted of any felony offense are automatically disenfranchised of their voting rights, a right which could only be personally restored by the Governor of Virginia. The plaintiffs alleged this to be in violation of the Virginia Readmission Act of 1870, a part of the Reconstruction Acts, which readmitted Virginia into the union on the condition that its residents would not be deprived of the right to vote, except in cases of rebellion or felonies at common law. Judge John A. Gibney Jr. ruled in favor of the plaintiffs, ordering that voting rights be restored to Virginians with felony convictions, except those convicted of crimes which would have been common-law felonies in 1870. As of July 2026, the implementation of the ruling remains ongoing and has been subject to numerous delays and disputes.

== Background ==
Following the end of the American Civil War, Congress began the process of re-admitting former Confederate states back into the union. Of particular concern to Congress was the voting eligibility of newly-freed African Americans. As part of the Virginia Readmission Act of 1870, Congress required:

"That the Constitution of Virginia shall never be so amended or changed as to deprive any citizen or class of citizens of the United States of the right to vote who are entitled to vote by the Constitution herein recognized, except as a punishment for such crimes as are now felonies at common law, whereof they shall have been duly convicted under laws equally applicable to all the inhabitants of said State."

Despite this requirement, the Constitution of Virginia was gradually amended to disenfranchise felons. The Virginia Constitutional Convention of 1901-02 created automatic disenfranchisement for certain crimes. The rationale for these restrictions were made abundantly clear by the members present. Leading Delegate Carter Glass put forth the goal of "...the elimination of every negro voter who can be gotten rid of, legally, without materially impairing the numerical strength of the white electorate."

In 1971, Virginia again amended its constitution, and required "No person who has been convicted of a felony shall be qualified to vote unless his civil rights have been restored by the Governor or other appropriate authority." That specific provision remained fully in effect until 2026.

Disenfranchisement laws per US State based on felony conviction as of May 2023.

A 2024 estimate from the Sentencing Project found over 264,000 voters were disenfranchised in Virginia. Of those disenfranchised, over 45% were African-American, representing over 1/5th the total population of eligible African-American voters in the state. Virginia was the last U.S. state to permanently disenfranchise all felony convictions with no automatic restoration process.

The Democratic governorships of Terry McAuliffe and Ralph Northam instituted a policy of near-automatic voting rights restoration, with each of them restoring 168,000 and 120,000 voters, respectively. However, the trend ended with the inauguration of Republican Glenn Youngkin, who took a more individualistic approach towards restoration, considering factors such as the nature of the offense and whether restitution had been paid. By the third year of his term, fewer than 10,000 voters had their rights restored.

== Parties ==
=== Plaintiffs ===
Tati Abu King and Toni Heath Johnson were convicted of drug-related offenses, and subsequently lost the right to vote in Virginia. Both submitted applications to the Governor's Office to have their rights restored, but neither were successful. The plaintiffs are represented by multinational law firm WilmerHale and supported by the American Civil Liberties Union and the Protect Democracy group.

=== Defendants ===
Originally, the lawsuit listed numerous defendants across the Virginia State Government, including Governor Glenn Youngkin, Secretary of the Commonwealth Kelly Gee, Board of Elections Chairman John O'Bannon alongside all of the board's members, Department of Elections Commissioner Susan Beals, as well as the General Registrars of Fairfax and Smyth counties. Governor Youngkin and Secretary Kee were later dismissed from the lawsuit, but prior to dismissal the court case was known as King v. Youngkin.

== Procedural History ==
In June 2023, the plaintiffs filed a federal class-action lawsuit in the U.S. District Court for the Eastern District of Virginia. The state government filed a motion to dismiss the lawsuit, which was denied by the court in March 2024. State officials claimed immunity and appealed to the U.S. Court of Appeals for the Fourth Circuit, and in December 2024 were denied in a 3-0 opinion written by Justice Toby Heytens under the Ex parte Young doctrine. The state's appeal of certiorai to the Supreme Court was denied, and the case was remanded back to the District Court.

The plaintiffs' expert witnesses included historian and University of Richmond President Edward Ayers, as well as University of North Carolina law professor Carrissa Hessick. The Virginia Government objected to both witnesses, arguing that Ayers was "focusing on racial discrimination" and that Hessick was "a law professor, not a history professor." Both objections were overruled by the court, calling the arguments "unpersuasive" and writing that it "speaks worlds about the validity of the defendants’ quibbles."

The Virginia Government then challenged the court on constitutional grounds, alleging violations of the equal footing doctrine, the anticommanderring doctrine, and the void-for-vagueness doctrine. All three arguments were rejected by the court, calling them "unusual and untimely."

== Opinion of the Court ==
Judge John A. Gibney Jr. presided over the case. On January 22, 2026, the judge ruled in favor of the plaintiffs. The court found that the Virginia Readmission Act superseded the Constitution of Virginia under the Supremacy Clause, and found that the Virginia Constitution was in violation of federal law. In his opinion, Judge Gibney wrote:

For well over a century, the Commonwealth of Virginia has disobeyed a federal law designed to protect the right of former enslaved people to vote...Nearly one hundred and twenty-five years after Senator Glass pleaded to “emancipate Virginia” from Black voters, a class of would-be voters appears before this Court asking for true emancipation at the Commonwealth’s ballot boxes.

The court issued an injunction barring the Virginia Government from disenfranchising felons unless their conviction would have been a common-law crime in 1870. The court identified these crimes as arson, burgulary, prison escape, larceny, manslaughter, mayhem, murder, rape, or robbery. Sodomy and suicide were also identified as common-law crimes, though they are both no longer prosecuted in Virginia.

== Aftermath ==
=== Initial Reactions ===
The court's decision was met positively by the American Civil Liberties Union and Protect Democracy, both of whom were parties in the case. In a press release, the ACLU wrote "Virginia’s government has blatantly broken the law for more than a century by disenfranchising everyone with a felony conviction...Today, the Commonwealth is finally free of that Confederate legacy." Plaintiff Tati King stated, "After so many years of fighting for my rights, I will finally be able to participate in our democracy and exercise my vote as an American citizen." The Office of the Virginia Attorney General declined to comment.

=== Initial Legal Challenges ===
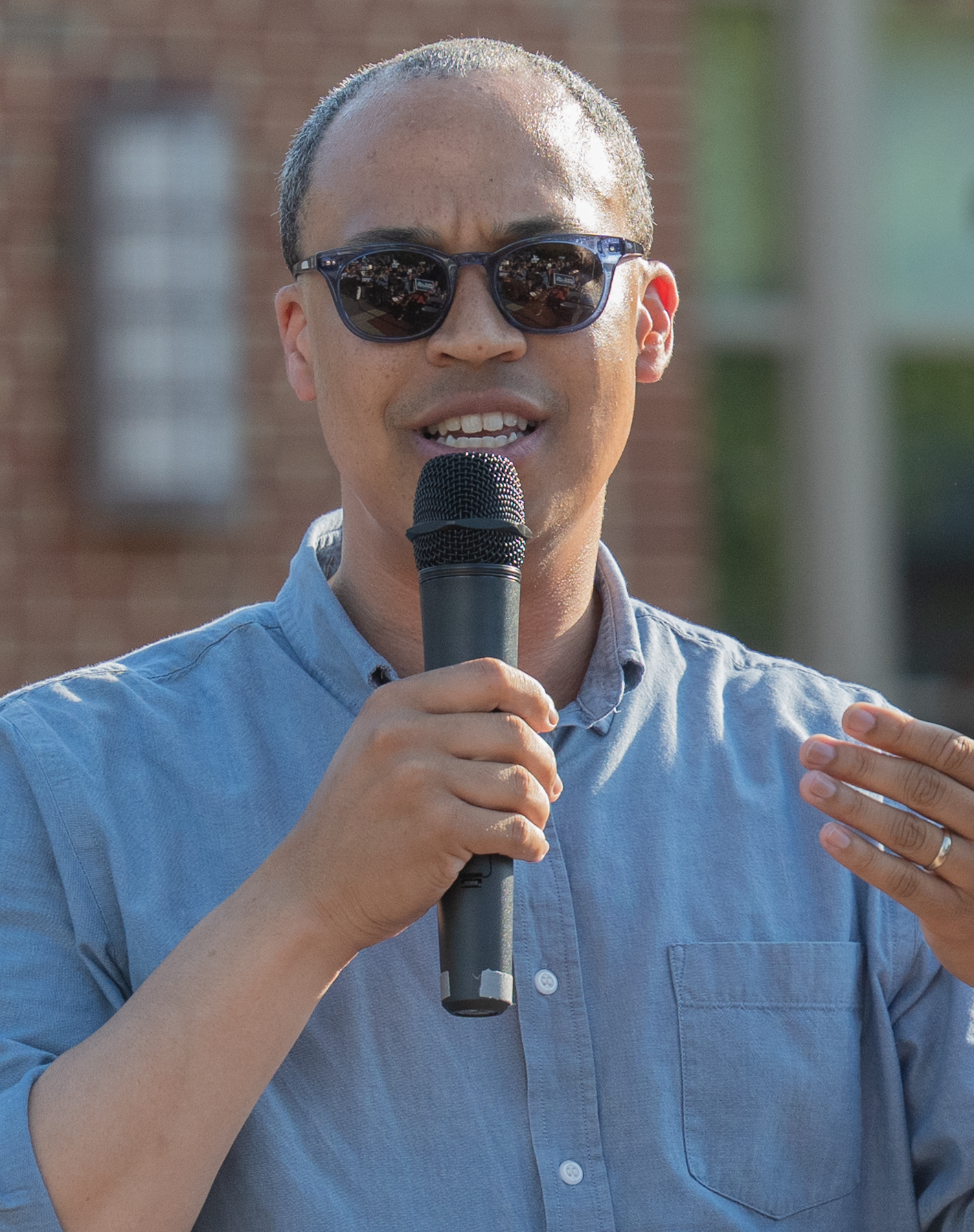
The motions by Attorney General of Virginia Jay Jones to modify the court's ruling were denied.

In February 2026, Virginia Attorney General Jay Jones petitioned the court to amend the ruling, in an effort to have the court re-examine the list of common-law offenses, and to exclude currently-incarcerated prisoners from getting their voting rights restored. Voting while incarcerated is legal in Maine and Vermont, and is authorized in certain cases in Alaska, Alabama, and Mississippi. The state's petition was denied by the court, though the court chose not to take a position on the status of currently incarcerated prisoners. A spokesperson for Attorney General Jay Jones stated they "look forward to working with the Court to implement the relief ordered by the judge."

=== Delays in Implementation ===
The original injunction issued by the court gave the Virginia Government until May 1st to comply with the order. Three days before the deadline, Virginia Attorney General Jay Jones and both plaintiffs in the case agreed on a revised deadline of June 1st, which was approved by the court. In a filing, the Attorney General's Office claimed "technical and administrative challenges" required additional time to implement the order.

On June 1st, the Virginia Department of Elections issued a bulletin to state election officials, advising them to not approve nor deny applications from voters with felonies, a decision which resulted in widespread criticism. As of June 2026, both plaintiffs in the case have still been unable to register to vote, despite the court's order. On June 18th, the ACLU filed a motion to enforce the court's order, which is currently under consideration by the court.

=== Disputed List of "Common Law" Felonies ===
In its opinion, the court listed eleven crimes considered "common-law offenses" in 1870, two of which are no longer prosecuted in Virginia. In contrast, the Virginia Department of Elections created a list of 181 felonies "applicable to common law felonies" which would result in automatic denial of restoration. Additionally, 103 felonies were listed as "may be applicable," which the department states must result in an individual review by the Office of the Virginia Attorney General. Some offenses on these lists, such as those relating to tear gas or catalytic converters, are based on technology that did not exist in 1870. The ACLU has alleged that the department's extensive lists "contravenes the court's order," and legal proceedings remain ongoing.

=== Proposed Constitutional Amendment ===
A proposed constitutional amendment which would automatically restore voting rights to formerly incarcerated felons passed the Virginia General Assembly in 2026. It was approved by voters in the November 2026 Virginia elections, and will take effect January 1, 2027.
