= Eric Cantor =

American politician (born 1963)

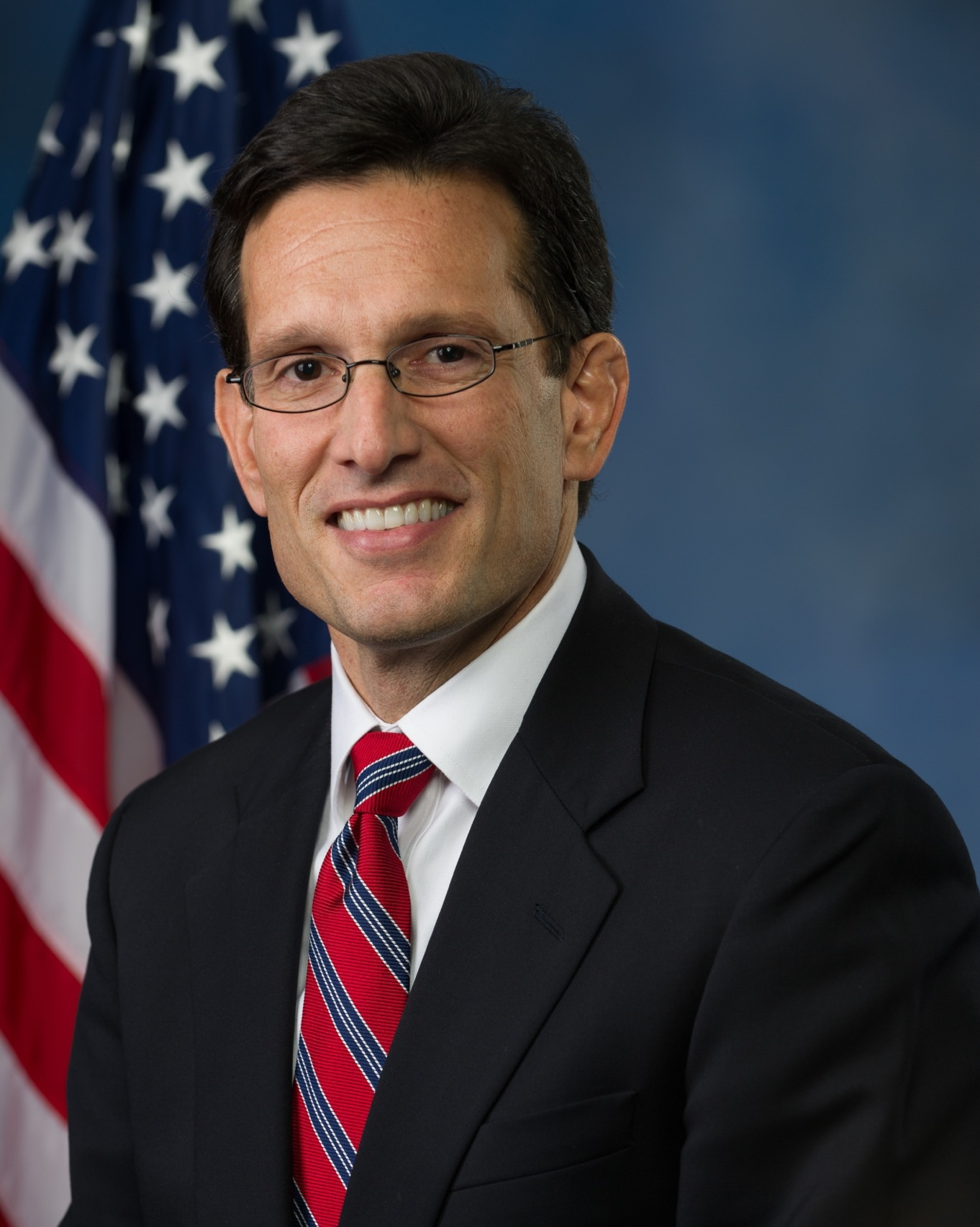
- Official portrait, 2012

House Majority Leader
- In office January 3, 2011 – August 1, 2014
- Speaker: John Boehner
- Preceded by: Steny Hoyer
- Succeeded by: Kevin McCarthy

House Minority Whip
- In office January 3, 2009 – January 3, 2011
- Leader: John Boehner
- Preceded by: Roy Blunt
- Succeeded by: Steny Hoyer

House Republican Chief Deputy Whip
- In office January 3, 2003 – January 3, 2009
- Leader: Dennis Hastert
- Preceded by: Roy Blunt
- Succeeded by: Kevin McCarthy

Member of the U.S. House of Representatives from Virginia's 7th district
- In office January 3, 2001 – August 18, 2014
- Preceded by: Thomas J. Bliley Jr.
- Succeeded by: Dave Brat

Member of the Virginia House of Delegates from the 73rd district
- In office January 8, 1992 – January 3, 2001
- Preceded by: Walter Stosch
- Succeeded by: John O'Bannon

Personal details
- Born: Eric Ivan Cantor; June 6, 1963 (age 63) Richmond, Virginia, U.S.
- Party: Republican
- Spouse: Diana Fine (m. 1989)
- Children: 3
- Education: George Washington University (BA); College of William and Mary (JD); Columbia University (MS)
- Cantor's voice Cantor awarding the Congressional Gold Medal to victims of the 16th Street Baptist Church bombing. Recorded April 24, 2013

Eric Ivan Cantor (born June 6, 1963) is an American politician and lawyer who served as the U.S. representative for Virginia's 7th congressional district from 2001 until his resignation in 2014. A member of the Republican Party, Cantor served as House minority whip from 2009 to 2011 and as House majority leader from 2011 to 2014.

Prior to serving in the House of Representatives, Cantor represented the 73rd district in the Virginia House of Delegates from 1992 to 2001. His congressional district included most of the northern and western sections of Richmond, along with most of Richmond's western suburbs, and until redistricting in 2013 also portions of the Shenandoah Valley.

In June 2014, in his bid for re-election, Cantor lost the Republican primary to economics professor Dave Brat in a massive upset that greatly surprised political analysts. In response, Cantor announced his early resignation as House majority leader. Several weeks later, he announced his resignation from Congress, which took effect on August 18, 2014. Shortly thereafter, Cantor accepted a position as vice chairman of investment bank Moelis & Company. At the time of his resignation, Cantor was the highest-ranking Jewish member of Congress in its history and the only non-Christian Republican in either house.

On September 29, 2026, he was announced as the incoming president and chief executive officer of the Pharmaceutical Research and Manufacturers of America (PhRMA), the trade group representing pharmaceutical companies.

== Early life, education, and career ==
Cantor, the second of three children, was born in Richmond, Virginia, the son of Mary Lee (née Hudes), a schoolteacher, and Eddie Cantor, who owned a real estate firm. His family emigrated from Russia, Romania, and Latvia in the late 1800s and early 1900s. His father was the Virginia state treasurer for Ronald Reagan's 1980 presidential campaign. Cantor was raised in Conservative Judaism.

He graduated from the Collegiate School, a co-ed private school in Richmond, in 1981. He enrolled at George Washington University (GW) in 1981; as a freshman he worked as an intern for House Republican Tom Bliley of Virginia, and was Bliley's driver in the 1982 campaign. Cantor was a member of Phi Sigma Kappa fraternity while at GW and received his Bachelor of Arts in 1985. He earned a Juris Doctor degree from William & Mary Law School in 1988, and received a Master of Science in Real Estate Development from Columbia University in 1989.

Cantor worked in his family's real estate business before being elected to Congress.

== Virginia House of Delegates ==
Cantor served in the Virginia House of Delegates from 1992 to January 1, 2001. At various times he was a member of committees on Science and Technology, Corporation Insurance and Banking, General Laws, Courts of Justice, (co-chairman) Claims. Cantor announced on March 14, 2000, that he would seek the seat in the United States House of Representatives that was being vacated by Tom Bliley. Cantor had chaired Bliley's reelection campaigns for the previous six years, and immediately gained the support of Bliley's political organization, as well as Bliley's endorsement later in the primary. However, Cantor still faced an extremely spirited challenge in the primary and won that election by only a razor-thin margin of 263 votes out of over 40,000 cast.

== U.S. House of Representatives ==
=== Committee assignments ===
During his first term, Cantor was chairman of the Congressional Task Force on Terrorism and Unconventional Warfare. He has also served on the House Financial Services Committee and on the House International Relations Committee and the House Ways and Means Committee.

=== Party leadership ===
In 2002, weeks after winning a second term, Cantor was appointed by Republican whip Roy Blunt to be Chief Deputy Republican Whip, the highest appointed position in the Republican caucus.

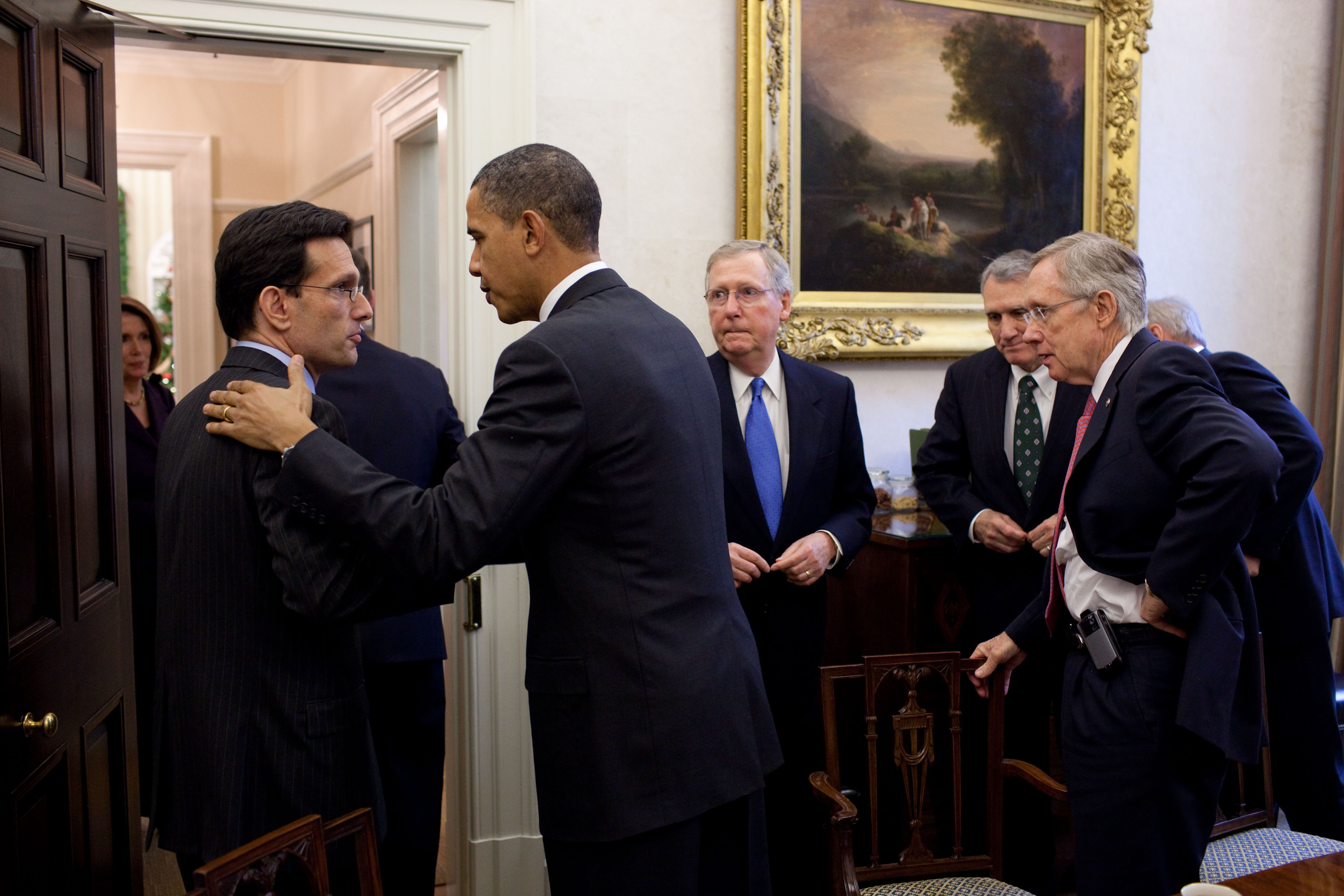
Cantor and other House and Senate leaders meeting with President Barack Obama in November 2010.

On November 19, 2008, Cantor was unanimously elected Republican whip for the 111th Congress, after serving as deputy whip for six years under Blunt. Blunt had decided not to seek reelection to the post after Republican losses in the previous two elections. Cantor was the first member of either party from Virginia to hold the position of Party Whip. As Whip, Cantor was the second-ranking House Republican, behind Minority Leader John Boehner. He was charged with coordinating the votes and messages of Republican House members. Cantor became the majority leader when the 112th Congress took office on January 3, 2011, after Republicans took back control of the House of Representatives. In this position, he remained second-in-command to Boehner, who was the leader of the House Republicans.

Cantor was a member of the Republican Jewish Coalition, while also being associated with the now defunct, "ERICPAC" (Every Republican is Crucial) and the Republican National Committee. He is one of the Republican Party's top fundraisers, having raised over $30 million for the National Republican Congressional Committee (NRCC). He is also one of the three founding members of the GOP Young Guns Program. In the fall of 2010, Cantor wrote a New York Times bestselling book, Young Guns: A New Generation of Conservative Leaders, with the other two founding members of Young Guns. They describe the vision outlined in the book as "a clear agenda based on common sense for the common good". Cantor said in 2010 that he worked with the Tea Party movement in his district.

As House majority leader, Cantor was named in House Resolution 368, which was passed by the House Rules Committee on the night of September 30, 2013, the night before the October 2013 government shutdown began, as the only member of the House with the power to bring forth bills and resolutions for a vote if both chambers of Congress disagree on that bill or resolution. Prior to the resolution's passing in committee, it was within the power of every member of the House under House Rule XXII, Clause 4 to be granted privilege to call for a vote. This amendment to the House rules was blamed for causing the partial government shutdown and for prolonging it since Cantor refused to allow the Senate's continuing resolution to be voted on in the House. Journalists and commentators noted during the shutdown that if the Senate's version of the continuing resolution were to be voted on, it would have passed the House with a majority vote since enough Democrats and Republicans supported it, effectively ending the government shutdown.

=== Legislation ===
Cantor was a strong supporter of the Gabriella Miller Kids First Research Act, which he was the one to name in Gabriella Miller's honor. The bill, which passed in both the House and the Senate, would end taxpayer contributions to the Presidential Election Campaign Fund and divert the money in that fund to pay for research into pediatric cancer through the National Institutes of Health. The total funding for research would come to $126 million over 10 years. As of 2014, the national conventions got about 23% of their funding from the Presidential Election Campaign Fund. Cantor said that the bill "clearly reflects Congressional priorities in funding: medical research before political parties and conventions".

== Political positions ==
For much of his career in the House, Cantor was the only Jewish Republican in the United States Congress. He supports strong United States–Israel relations. He cosponsored legislation to cut off all U.S. taxpayer aid to the Palestinian Authority and another bill calling for an end to taxpayer aid to the Palestinians until they stop unauthorized excavations on the Temple Mount in Jerusalem. Responding to a claim by the State Department that the United States provides no direct aid to the Palestinian Authority, Cantor claimed that United States sends about US$75 million in aid annually to the Palestinian Authority, which is administered by the U.S. Agency for International Development. He opposed a Congressionally approved three-year package of US$400 million in aid for the Palestinian Authority in 2000 and has also introduced legislation to end aid to the Palestinian territories.

In May 2008, Cantor said that the Israeli–Palestinian conflict is not a "constant sore" but rather "a constant reminder of the greatness of America", and following Barack Obama's election as President in November 2008, Cantor stated that a "stronger U.S.–Israel relationship" remains a top priority for him and that he would be "very outspoken" if Obama "did anything to undermine those ties." Shortly after the 2010 midterm elections, Cantor met privately with Israeli prime minister Benjamin Netanyahu, just before Netanyahu was to meet with US secretary of state Hillary Clinton. According to Cantor's office, he "stressed that the new Republican majority will serve as a check on the Administration" and "made clear that the Republican majority understands the special relationship between Israel and the United States." Cantor was criticized for engaging in foreign policy; one basis for the criticism was that in 2007, after Nancy Pelosi met with the president of Syria, Cantor himself had raised the possibility "that her recent diplomatic overtures ran afoul of the Logan Act, which makes it a felony for any American 'without authority of the United States' to communicate with a foreign government to influence that government's behavior on any disputes with the United States."

=== Social issues ===
Cantor opposed public funding of embryonic stem cell research and opposed elective abortion. He was rated 100% by the National Right to Life Committee (NRLC) and 0% by NARAL Pro-Choice America, indicating a pro-life voting record. He was opposed to same-sex marriage as of the mid-2000s, voting to Constitutionally define marriage as between a male and a female in 2006. In November 2007 he voted against prohibiting job discrimination based on sexual orientation. He also supported making flag burning illegal. The National Association for the Advancement of Colored People (NAACP) rated him 19% in 2006, indicating an anti-affirmative action voting record. He was opposed to gun control, voting to ban product misuse lawsuits on gun manufacturers in 2005, and he voted not to require gun registration and trigger-lock laws in the District of Columbia. He had a rating of "A" from the NRA Political Victory Fund (NRA-PVF). On November 2, 2010, Cantor told Wolf Blitzer of CNN that he would try to trim the federal deficit by reducing welfare.

=== Economy, budgeting, and trade ===
Cantor was a supporter of free trade, voting to promote trade with Peru, Chile, Singapore, and Australia. He also voted for the Central America Free Trade Agreement (CAFTA). He voted against raising the minimum wage to US$7.25 in 2007. The American Federation of Labor and Congress of Industrial Organizations (AFL–CIO), the largest federation of trade unions in the United States, rates Cantor 0%, indicating an anti-Union voting record.

In October 2008, Cantor advocated and voted for the TARP program which aided distressed banks.

On September 29, 2008, Cantor blamed Pelosi for what he felt was the failure of the $700 billion economic bailout bill. He noted that 94 Democrats voted against the measure, as well as 133 Republicans. Though supporting the Federal bailout of the nation's largest private banks, he referred to Pelosi's proposal to appoint a Car czar to run the US Automobile Industry Bailout as a "bureaucratic" imposition on private business.

The following February, Cantor led Republicans in the House of Representatives in voting against the American Recovery and Reinvestment Act of 2009 and was a prominent spokesman in voicing the many issues he and his fellow Republicans had with the legislation. Cantor voted in favor of a 90% marginal tax rate increase on taxpayer financed bonuses, despite receiving campaign contributions from TARP recipient Citigroup.

In his book Young Guns, Cantor summarized Keynesian economics with the following opinion, "The idea is that the government can be counted on to spend more wisely than the people."

As majority leader, Cantor steered the STOCK Act through the House, which requires congressmen to disclose their stock investments more regularly and in a more transparent manner. The legislation passed the House in a 417–2 bipartisan vote on February 9, 2012. It was ultimately signed by President Obama on April 4, 2012. In July 2012, CNN reported that changes made by the House version of the legislation excluded reporting requirements by spouses and dependent children. Initially, Cantor's office insisted it did nothing to change the intent of the STOCK Act; however, when presented with new information from CNN, the majority leader's office recognized that changes had unintentionally been made and offered technical corrections to fulfill the original intent of the legislation. These corrections were passed by Congress on August 3, 2012.

As majority leader, Cantor shepherded the JOBS Act through the House, which combined bipartisan ideas for economic growth – like crowdfunding for startups – into one piece of legislation. Ultimately, President Obama, Eric Cantor, Steve Case and other leaders joined together at the signing ceremony.

Cantor proposed initiatives which he purported would help small businesses grow, including a 20 percent tax cut for businesses that employ fewer than 500 people.

=== Other foreign affairs ===
In an article he wrote for the National Review in 2007, he condemned Nancy Pelosi's diplomatic visit to Syria, and her subsequent meeting with President Bashar al-Assad, whom he referred to as a "dictator and terror-sponsor"; saying that if "Speaker Pelosi's diplomatic foray into Syria weren't so harmful to U.S. interests in the Middle East, it would have been laughable."

In 2014, Cantor criticized what he referred to as "the isolationist sentiment" and said that it was a mistake to withdraw from Iraq and had called for troops to remain in Afghanistan.

During the 2016 presidential election Cantor, a supporter of Israel, called on Donald Trump to be more consistent with his support for Israel.

== Political campaigns ==
Cantor formerly represented Virginia's 7th congressional district, which stretched from the western end of Richmond, through its suburbs, and northward to Page, Rappahannock Culpeper and parts of Spotsylvania, county. It also included the towns of Mechanicsville and Laurel. The district had traditionally been strongly Republican; it had been in Republican hands since 1981 until 2018, when Cantor's successor Dave Brat lost his re-election to Abigail Spanberger (it was numbered as the 3rd District prior to 1993).

=== Virginia House of Delegates ===
Cantor was first elected to the Virginia House of Delegates in 1991, winning the race for the 73rd district seat unopposed. He was re-elected in 1993 with 79% of the vote. He won re-election in 1995, 1997, and 1999; in all three races he was unopposed.

=== House of Representatives ===
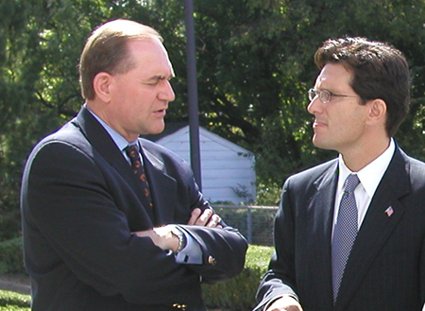
Cantor with then-Governor Jim Gilmore, 2002

Cantor was first elected to the U.S. House of Representatives in 2000, succeeding retiring 20-year incumbent Republican Tom Bliley. He defeated the Democratic nominee, Warren A. Stewart, by nearly 100,000 votes. Cantor had won the closely contested Republican primary — the real contest in what was then one of the most Republican districts in Virginia — over state senator Steve Martin by only 263 votes. During his first term, he was one of only two Jewish Republicans serving concurrently in the House of Representatives, the other being Ben Gilman(R-NY). Gilman retired in 2002, leaving Cantor the sole Jewish Republican House member.

In 2002, Cantor was opposed by Democrat Ben Jones, an actor (who had played "Cooter Davenport" on The Dukes of Hazzard) and a former congressman from Georgia.

In 2004, Cantor was opposed by Independent W. B. Blanton. Cantor won with 75.5% of the vote. In 2006, Cantor was opposed by Democrat James M. Nachman and Independent W. B. Blanton. Cantor won with 64% to Nachman's 34% and Blanton's 2%.

In August 2008, news reports surfaced that Cantor was being considered as John McCain's Vice-Presidential running mate, with McCain's representatives seeking documents from Cantor as part of its vetting process. The idea for Cantor to be McCain's running mate was supported by conservative leaders like Richard Land and Erick Erickson. Cantor was not selected for the vice presidential nomination, and in his 2008 re-election campaign, Cantor defeated Democratic challenger Anita Hartke 63%–37%.

In 2010, Cantor was re-elected with 59% of the vote.

In 2012, Cantor faced a primary challenger, Floyd C. Bayne, in the June 12 Republican primary; Cantor won the primary with 79% of the vote and then defeated Democratic challenger Wayne Powell in the general election. Although he won with 58% of the vote, Cantor received his lowest vote percentage since being elected to Congress in 2000.

=== 2014 Republican primary and resignation ===
County and independent city results Brat: 50–60%; 60–70%; Cantor: 50–60%; 60–70%

On June 10, 2014, in a major upset, Cantor lost the Republican primary 44.47%–55.53% to Dave Brat, a Tea Party candidate and a professor at Randolph-Macon College. That made Cantor the first sitting House majority leader to lose a primary since the position was created in 1899. Internal campaign polls before the primary showed Cantor 30 points ahead of Brat, and he outspent Brat 40 to 1.

Cantor's loss in the primary was described by the Los Angeles Times as "one of the greatest political upsets of modern times." His loss was attributed to numerous factors including a moderating of his views after entering House leadership, being disconnected from his district, a lack of enthusiasm among his supporters, low turnout for the primary election, and support of Brat from radio talk show hosts.

Although the national media were shocked at Brat's victory, Richmond-area media outlets had received signs well before the primary that Cantor was in trouble. The Richmond Times-Dispatch reported two weeks before the primary that a number of Cantor's constituents felt he took them for granted. The Times-Dispatch also revealed that Cantor's attempt to brand Brat as a liberal professor actually made more people turn out for Brat. The Chesterfield Observer, a local paper serving Chesterfield County—roughly half of which is in the 7th—reported that Tea-Party-aligned candidates had won several victories there, and at least one Cantor loyalist believed Tea Party supporters smelled "blood in the water." One local reporter told David Carr of The New York Times that many constituents believed Cantor was arrogant and unapproachable. However, due to massive cutbacks, the race was severely under-polled by local media. Few Capitol Hill reporters were willing to go to Cantor's district, for fear that they would be out of Washington in case a major story broke.

Following his primary defeat, Cantor announced his resignation as House majority leader effective on July 31 and declared that he would not run in the general election. In an interview with the Times-Dispatch that day, Cantor announced his resignation from Congress effective August 18 and said that he had asked Virginia governor Terry McAuliffe to call for a special election on November 4 to coincide with the 2014 general election.

In early September, advisory firm Moelis & Company announced that it was appointing Eric Cantor as vice chairman and managing director and that he would be elected to the Moelis & Company board of directors.

On September 29, 2026, Cantor was announced as the incoming president and chief executive officer of PhRMA, the industry trade group representing pharmaceutical companies.

== Threats and campaign office incident ==
After the passage of the health care reform bill in March 2010, Cantor reported that somebody had shot a bullet through a window of his campaign office in Richmond, Virginia. A spokesman for the Richmond police later stated that the bullet was not intentionally fired at Cantor's office, saying that it was instead random gunfire, as there were no signs outside the office identifying the office as being Cantor's. Cantor responded to this by saying that Democratic leaders in the House should stop "dangerously fanning the flames" by blaming Republicans for threats against House Democrats who voted for the health care legislation.

Cantor also reported that he had received threatening e-mails related to the passage of the bill. In March 2010, a person was arrested for making threats against Cantor and his family.

In 2011, Cantor received two threatening phone calls from a person who left "screaming, profanity-laden messages [that] stated that he was going to destroy Cantor, rape his daughter and kill his wife." Glendon Swift plead guilty and was sentenced in April 2012 to 13 months in federal prison.

== Electoral history ==
Virginia's 7th congressional district: Results 2000–2014
Year	Democratic	Votes	Pct	Republican	Votes	Pct	Other	Party	Votes	Pct	
2000	Warren A. Stewart	94,935	33%	Eric Cantor	192,652	67%					*
2002	Ben L. "Cooter" Jones	49,854	30%	Eric Cantor	113,658	69%					*
2004	(no candidate)			Eric Cantor	230,765	75%	W. Brad Blanton	Independent	74,325	24%	*
2006	Jim Nachman	88,206	34%	Eric Cantor	163,706	64%	W. Brad Blanton	Independent	4,213	2%	*
2008	Anita Hartke	138,123	37%	Eric Cantor	233,531	63%					
2010	Rick Waugh	79,607	34%	Eric Cantor	138,196	59%	Floyd Bayne	Independent Green	15,164	6%	*
2012	E. Wayne Powell	158,012	41%	Eric Cantor	222,983	58%					

*Write-in candidate notes: In 2000, write-ins received 304 votes. In 2002, write-ins received 153 votes. In 2004, write-ins received 568 votes. In 2006, write-ins received 272 votes. In 2008, write-ins received 683 votes. In 2010, write-ins received 413 votes. In 2012, write-ins received 914 votes.

== Personal life ==
Cantor met his wife, Diana Marcy Fine, on a blind date, and they were married in 1989. They have three children, Evan, Jenna, and Michael.

Diana Cantor is a lawyer, certified public accountant, and a managing director in a division of Emigrant Bank, a subsidiary of New York Private Bank & Trust Corp. She founded, and from 1996 until 2008 was executive director of, the Virginia College Savings Plan, an agency of the Commonwealth of Virginia. She was also chairman of the board of the College Savings Plans Network. Unlike her husband, she favors abortion rights and supports same-sex marriage.

== See also ==
- List of Jewish members of the United States Congress

U.S. House of Representatives
Preceded by Thomas Bliley	Member of the U.S. House of Representatives from Virginia's 7th congressional district 2001–2014	Succeeded by Dave Brat
Preceded by Roy Blunt	House Minority Whip; 2009–2011	Succeeded by Steny Hoyer
Preceded by Steny Hoyer	House Majority Leader; 2011–2014	Succeeded by Kevin McCarthy
Party political offices
Preceded by Roy Blunt	House Republican Chief Deputy Whip; 2003–2009	Succeeded by Kevin McCarthy
Preceded by Roy Blunt	House Republican Deputy Leader; 2009–2014	Succeeded by Kevin McCarthy
U.S. order of precedence (ceremonial)
Preceded by Tom DeLay as Former House Majority Leader	Order of precedence of the United States as Former House Majority Leader	Succeeded by Tony Coelho as Former House Majority Whip
