= Virginia's 73rd House of Delegates district =

Virginia legislative district

District map from the 2023 election

Virginia's 73rd House of Delegates district elects one of 100 seats in the Virginia House of Delegates, the lower house of the state's bicameral legislature. The district covers part of Chesterfield County. District 73 has been represented by Leslie Mehta since 2026.

== District officeholders ==
Years	Delegate		Party	Electoral history
January 12, 1983 – January 8, 1992	Walter Stosch	Republican	First ever delegate in district; Declined to seek reelection; Elected to the Senate of Virginia	
January 8, 1992 – January 3, 2001	Eric Cantor	Republican	Declined to seek reelection; Elected to the US House of Representatives	
January 10, 2001 – January 10, 2018	John O'Bannon	Republican	Defeated in bid for re-election	
January 10, 2018 – January 8, 2020	Debra Rodman	Democratic	Declined to seek reelection, instead ran for Virginia's 12th Senate district.	
January 8, 2020 – January 10, 2024	Rodney Willett	Democratic	In 2023, after reorganization of District 73, instead ran for Virginia's 58th House of Delegates district.	
January 10, 2024 – January 14, 2026	Mark Earley Jr.	Republican	First elected in 2023.	
January 14, 2026 – present	Leslie Mehta	Democratic	First elected in 2025.	
