= Rodney Willett =

Virginia House of Delegates member

Rodney T. Willett
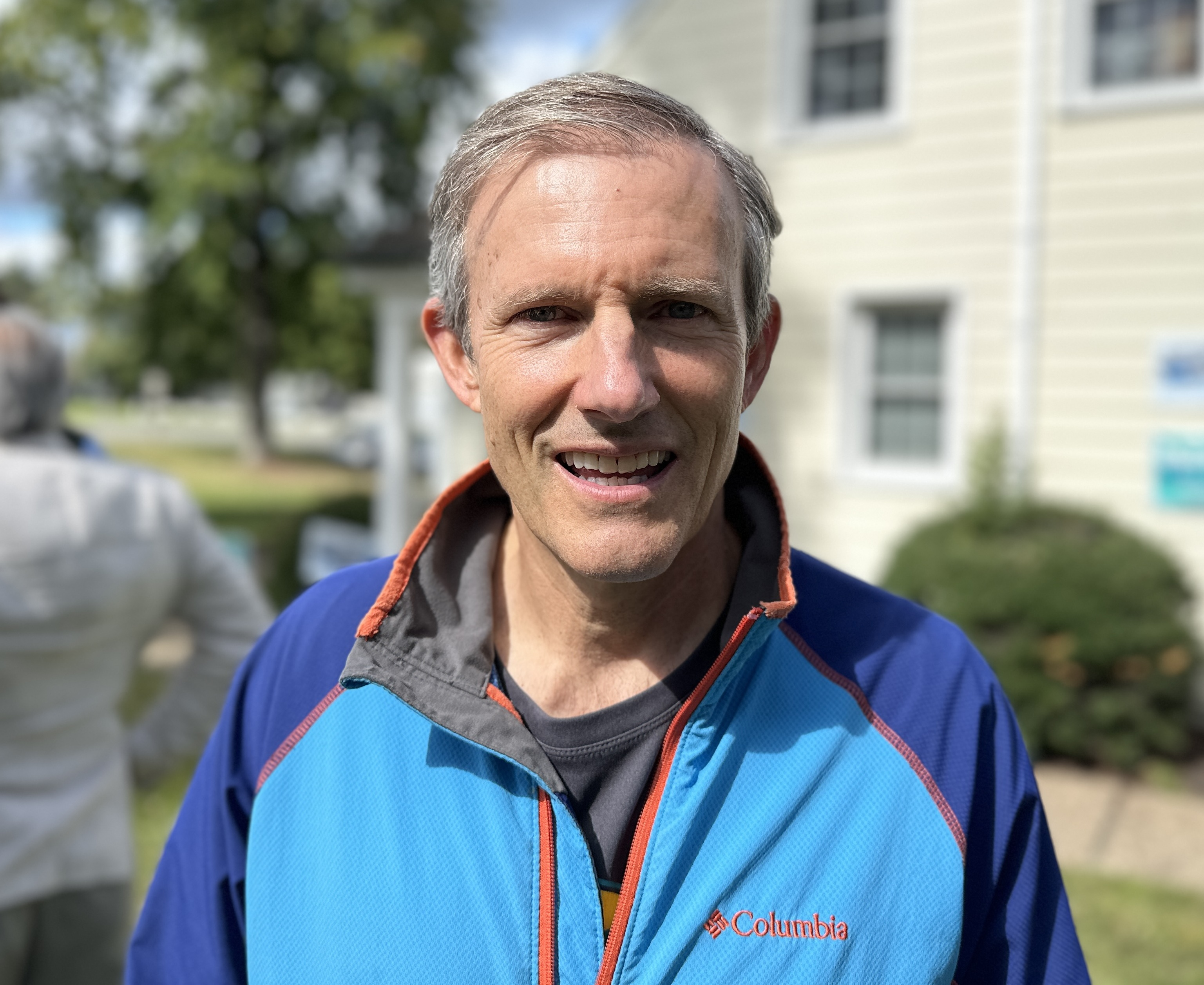
- Willett in 2023

Member of the Virginia House of Delegates
- Incumbent
- Assumed office January 8, 2020
- Preceded by: Debra Rodman
- Constituency: 73rd district (2020–2023); 58th district (2024–present)

Personal details
- Born: Portsmouth, Virginia, U.S.
- Party: Democratic
- Spouse: Lydia Pulley
- Children: 3
- Website: https://www.rodwillett.com/

Rodney T. Willett is an American politician who has served as a Democratic member of the Virginia House of Delegates since 2020, representing the 58th district.

== Biography ==
Willett was an attorney and technology consultant for Impact Makers. He is a College of William & Mary alumnus. Willett is also a member of several local organizations, and serves on the Virginia Children’s Health Insurance Program Advisory Committee.

== Political career ==
=== 2019 ===
Willett announced his campaign for the 73rd district after incumbent Democrat Debra Rodman announced her intent to run for the 12th Senate district. In the general election, he faced Republican Mary Margaret Kastelberg, a financial services adviser. Willett was elected with 52.20% of the vote.

=== 2021 ===
In 2021, Willett ran for re-election, again facing Mary Margaret Kastelberg. Willett was re-elected with 52.5% of the vote.

=== 2023 ===
In 2023, after reorganization of District 73, Willett ran for election in District 58. He faced Riley Shaia, a fitness instructor. Willett was elected with 58.47% of the vote.

=== 2025 ===
In 2025, Willett ran for re-election in District 58. He faced Milad H. Mikhail, a restaurant manager. Willett was elected with 61.33% of the vote.
