= Virginia Department of Elections =

US state agency

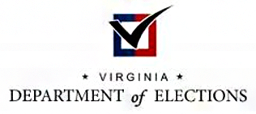

State-level agency overview
- Formed: 2014
- Preceding State-level agency: Virginia State Board of Elections
- Jurisdiction: Commonwealth of Virginia
- Headquarters: Richmond, Virginia
- Employees: 51-200
- State-level agency executives: John O'Bannon, Chairman of the Board; Rosalyn R. Dance, Vice-Chairman of the Board; Georgia Alvis-Long, Secretary of the Board; Donald W. Merricks, Board Member; Matthew Weinstein, Board Member; Steve Koski, Commissioner of Elections
- Website: https://www.elections.virginia.gov/

The Virginia Department of Elections (ELECT) is an agency that administers elections in Virginia. Its duties include maintaining a voter registration system, ensuring fair and secure elections, overseeing campaign finance disclosure, and certificating voter equipment in coordination with Virginia's 133 local election offices.

== History ==
The predecessor to ELECT, the Virginia State Board of Elections (SBE), was founded in 1946 as a nonpolitical agency to ensure fairness and accuracy in the commonwealth's elections. The SBE promoted proper administration of election laws and voter registration.

In 2014, this process was further expanded with the creation of ELECT. ELECT is responsible for the SBE's administrative and programmatic operations and discharges the board's duties consistent with delegated authority.

== Leadership ==
The department is led by a five-member body, the State Board of Elections. A commissioner is in charge of supervising the board. The Department's current commissioner is Steve Koski. ELECT is made up of three business units that work with a regulatory board.

== Role ==
State law provides that, "The State Board, through the Department of Elections, shall supervise and coordinate the work of the county and city electoral boards and of the registrars to obtain uniformity in their practices and proceedings and legality and purity in all elections."
