= National Register of Historic Places listings in Orange County, Virginia =

Location of Orange County in Virginia

This is a list of the National Register of Historic Places listings in Orange County, Virginia.

This is intended to be a complete list of the properties and districts on the National Register of Historic Places in Orange County, Virginia, United States. The locations of National Register properties and districts for which the latitude and longitude coordinates are included below, may be seen in an online map.

There are 36 properties and districts listed on the National Register in the county, including 1 National Historic Landmark.

This National Park Service list is complete through NPS recent listings posted March 6, 2026.

== Current listings ==
	Name on the Register	Image	Date listed	Location	City or town	Description
1	Ballard-Marshall House	Ballard-Marshall House	October 27, 1988 (#88002138)	158 E. Main St. 38°14′45″N 78°06′30″W	Orange	
2	Barboursville	Barboursville	November 12, 1969 (#69000267)	South of the junction of Vineyard Rd. and Governor Barbour St. 38°09′45″N 78°16′51″W	Barboursville	
3	Berry Hill	Berry Hill	May 7, 1980 (#80004208)	South of Orange on Old Gordonsville Rd. 38°14′18″N 78°06′27″W	Orange	
4	Black Meadow	Black Meadow	November 16, 2005 (#05001262)	17379 Wolf Trap Dr. 38°10′03″N 78°08′31″W	Gordonsville	
5	Bloomsbury	Bloomsbury	February 27, 1992 (#92000044)	Off State Route 20, west of its junction with Mt. Sharon Rd. 38°15′23″N 78°03′18″W	Orange	
6	Burlington	Burlington	January 11, 1994 (#93001458)	6400 State Route 20; 38°10′45″N 78°15′38″W	Barboursville	
7	Chestnut Hill	Chestnut Hill	June 11, 2009 (#09000417)	236 Caroline St. 38°14′21″N 78°06′51″W	Orange	
8	Exchange Hotel	Exchange Hotel	August 14, 1973 (#73002046)	S. Main St. 38°08′08″N 78°11′10″W	Gordonsville	
9	Frascati	Frascati	June 28, 1982 (#82004579)	South of Somerset on State Route 231; 38°11′35″N 78°12′43″W	Somerset	
10	Germanna Site	Germanna Site	August 24, 1978 (#78003036)	2062 State Route 3; 38°22′56″N 77°46′50″W	Culpeper	
11	Gordonsville Historic District	Gordonsville Historic District	October 13, 1983 (#83004250)	U.S. Route 15 and vicinity 38°08′20″N 78°11′17″W	Gordonsville	
12	Greenwood	Greenwood	December 17, 1992 (#92001702)	13011 Greenwood Rd. 38°13′45″N 78°08′23″W	Orange	
13	Grelen	Grelen	February 13, 1998 (#98000049)	15149 Grelen Dr. 38°16′32″N 78°06′52″W	Orange	
14	Hampstead Farm Archeological District	Hampstead Farm Archeological District	August 16, 1984 (#84003559)	Scuffletown Rd. 38°13′46″N 78°14′42″W	Barboursville	
15	Hare Forest Farm		January 28, 1992 (#91002016)	Trimmers Rd., west of its junction with Rapidan Rd. 38°17′14″N 78°04′53″W	Orange	
16	Lessland	Lessland	August 5, 1999 (#99000965)	4256 Bushy Mountain Rd. 38°20′41″N 77°58′20″W	Culpeper	
17	Madison-Barbour Rural Historic District	Madison-Barbour Rural Historic District	January 17, 1991 (#90002115)	Roughly bounded by U.S. Route 15, the Rapidan River, and the Albemarle and Greene county lines 38°11′56″N 78°13′37″W	Barboursville	
18	Mayhurst	Mayhurst	November 12, 1969 (#69000268)	Southwest of the junction of U.S. Route 15 and Old Gordonsville Rd. 38°13′58″N 78°07′03″W	Orange	
19	Montpelier	Montpelier	October 15, 1966 (#66000843)	4 miles (6.4 km) west of Orange on State Route 20; 38°13′08″N 78°10′06″W	Orange	Residence of President James Madison
20	Mount Calvary Baptist Church	Mount Calvary Baptist Church	November 22, 2016 (#16000799)	11229 Kendall Rd. 38°15′03″N 78°01′07″W	Orange	
21	Mount Sharon	Mount Sharon	September 9, 2013 (#13000710)	19184 Mount Sharon Ln. 38°16′21″N 78°02′29″W	Orange	
22	Old Manse	Old Manse	February 1, 2018 (#100001498)	171 Landon Ln. 38°14′59″N 78°06′19″W	Orange	
23	Orange Commercial Historic District	Orange Commercial Historic District	January 21, 1999 (#98001651)	Roughly along Madison and Main Sts. 38°14′42″N 78°06′42″W	Orange	
24	Orange County Courthouse	Orange County Courthouse	December 28, 1979 (#79003062)	Madison Rd. and N. Main St. 38°14′43″N 78°06′41″W	Orange	
25	Orange High School	Orange High School	July 5, 2001 (#01000692)	224 Belleview Ave. 38°14′56″N 78°06′54″W	Orange	
26	Orange Springs	Orange Springs	February 27, 1992 (#90002134)	Orange Springs Rd., east of its junction with U.S. Route 522; 38°11′06″N 77°55′53″W	Unionville	
27	Rapidan Historic District	Rapidan Historic District	May 8, 1987 (#87000723)	Junction of Locust Dale, Rapidan, and Old Rapidan Rds. 38°18′46″N 78°03′58″W	Rapidan	
28	Rebel Hall	Rebel Hall	March 13, 2002 (#02000179)	151 May-Fray Ave. 38°14′50″N 78°06′36″W	Orange	
29	Rocklands	Rocklands	September 23, 1982 (#82004578)	North of Gordonsville on State Route 231; 38°10′07″N 78°11′38″W	Gordonsville	
30	Rockwood	Rockwood	July 5, 2001 (#01000695)	12225 Chicken Mountain Rd. 38°12′34″N 78°09′23″W	Montpelier Station	
31	St. Thomas Church	St. Thomas Church	December 6, 1976 (#76002115)	119 Caroline St. 38°14′38″N 78°06′47″W	Orange	
32	Somerset Christian Church	Somerset Christian Church	February 28, 1979 (#79003061)	State Route 20; 38°13′34″N 78°13′29″W	Old Somerset	
33	Tetley	Tetley	February 5, 1991 (#91000018)	Liberty Mills Rd., east of its junction with State Route 231; 38°14′23″N 78°12′13″W	Somerset	
34	Waddell Memorial Presbyterian Church	Waddell Memorial Presbyterian Church	August 28, 1975 (#75002028)	Southeast of Rapidan on Rapidan Rd. 38°18′30″N 78°03′45″W	Rapidan	
35	Willow Grove	Willow Grove	May 7, 1979 (#79003063)	2 miles (3.2 km) northwest of Orange on U.S. Route 15; 38°16′24″N 78°07′55″W	Madison Mills	
36	Williston	Williston	November 16, 2005 (#05001270)	13430 State Route 20; 38°14′24″N 78°08′13″W	Orange	

== See also ==
- List of National Historic Landmarks in Virginia
- National Register of Historic Places listings in Virginia
