= Barboursville =

Barboursville is the name of several places in the United States of America:

- Barboursville, Virginia
- Barboursville, West Virginia
- Barboursville (James Barbour) the Virginia home of James Barbour
- Barboursville Vineyards a winery located in Orange County, Virginia

== See also ==
- Barbourville (disambiguation)
