= Williston =

Williston may refer to:

== People ==
- Williston (surname)

== Places ==
United States

- Williston, Florida, a city in Levy County
- Williston, Kentucky, former name of Murray, Kentucky
- Williston, Maryland, a town in Caroline County
- Williston, New York a hamlet in Erie County
- Williston, North Dakota, a city in Williams County
- Williston, Ohio, a town in Ottawa County
- Williston, South Carolina, a town in Barnwell County
- Williston, Tennessee, a city in Fayette County
- Williston, Vermont, a town in Chittenden County
- Williston (Orange, Virginia), a historic home and farm complex in Orange County, Virginia
- Williston Highlands, Florida, a census-designated place in Levy County
- Williston Park, New York, a village in Nassau County

South Africa

- Williston, Northern Cape, a town in the Northern Cape Province

Canada

- Williston Lake, the largest man-made lake in North America, located in the Peace River Country of northern British Columbia

== Schools ==
- Williston Northampton School, a prep school in Easthampton, Massachusetts

== See also ==
- East Williston (disambiguation)
- Willison
- Williston Negotiation Competition, an annual negotiation and contract drafting competition at Harvard Law School
