= Willison =

Willison is a surname. Notable people with the surname include:

- Brian Willison (born 1977), American academic; former Executive Director of the Parsons Institute for Information Mapping
- David Willison (1919–2009), British soldier
- David Willison (pianist) (born 1936), English pianist
- George F. Willison (1896–1972), writer and editor who specialized in American history
- Herbert Willison (1872–1943), English solicitor and Liberal Party, later Liberal National politician
- Jackson Willison (born 1988), New Zealand rugby union footballer
- John Willison (1680–1750), Scottish clergyman
- John Stephen Willison (1856–1927), Canadian newspaperman, author, and businessman
- Kevin Willison (born 1958), Canadian professional ice hockey player
- Leigh Willison (born 1969), Australian rules football player
- Marjorie Willison, Canadian author of books on gardening and a radio personality
- Simon Willison, co-creator of the Django web framework
- Walter Willison (born 1947), American stage actor

== See also ==
- Willison coupler, a railway coupling.
- Willison railway station in Melbourne, Australia
- John Willison (disambiguation)
- Williston (disambiguation)
