= James Barbour (disambiguation) =

James Barbour (1775–1842) was an American lawyer, politician and planter.

James Barbour may also refer to:

- James Barbour (burgess) (1734–1804), landowner and member of the Virginia House of Burgesses
- James Barbour (lawyer) (1828–1895), Virginia lawyer, planter, politician and Confederate officer
- James Barbour (architect) (1834–1912) Scottish architect and antiquarian
- James J. Barbour (1869–1946), American politician and lawyer
- James Murray Barbour (1897–1970), American acoustician, musicologist and composer
- James Barbour (singer) (born 1966), American singer and Broadway actor
