= Bloomsbury (disambiguation) =

Bloomsbury is an area in central London.

Bloomsbury may also refer to:

== Places ==
- Bloomsbury (ward), related local government unit
- Bloomsbury, New Jersey, New Jersey, USA
- Bloomsbury (Frederick, Maryland), listed on the NRHP in Maryland
- Bloomsbury (Orange, Virginia), listed on the NRHP in Virginia
- Bloomsbury Farm (Spotsylvania County, Virginia), listed on the NRHP in Virginia
- Bloomsbury, Alberta, a locality in Canada

== Other ==
- Bloomsbury (horse), a Thoroughbred racehorse, winner of the 1839 Epsom Derby
- Bloomsbury, a 1905 novel by Charles Francis Keary
- Bloomsbury Group, an English literary group active from around 1905
- Bloomsbury Gang, a political grouping in 1765
- Bloomsbury Publishing, British publisher
- Bloomsbury Theatre, London
