= Berry Hill =

Berry Hill may refer to:

In Antarctica

- Berry Hill (Antarctica), a hill on James Ross Island.

In England:

- Berry Hill, Gloucestershire
- Berry Hill High School and Sports College, a secondary school in Staffordshire

In Scotland:

- Berry Hill, Aberdeenshire, site of a chalybeate spring well

In the United States:

- Berry Hill (Glenview, Kentucky), a National Register of Historic Places listing in Jefferson County, Kentucky
- Berry Hill (Taconic Mountains), a peak in western Massachusetts
- Berry Hill (New York), a peak in central New York
- Berry Hill, Tennessee
- Berry Hill, Virginia
- Berry Hill (Berry Hill, Virginia), NRHP-listed
- Berry Hill (Orange, Virginia), NRHP-listed
- Berry Hill Plantation in South Boston, Virginia
- Berry Hill Elementary School, as part of the Syosset Central School District

== See also ==
- Berryhill (disambiguation)
