= Hampstead Farm Archeological District =

Archaeological site in Virginia, United States

- U.S. National Register of Historic Places
- U.S. Historic district
- U.S. Historic district – Contributing property
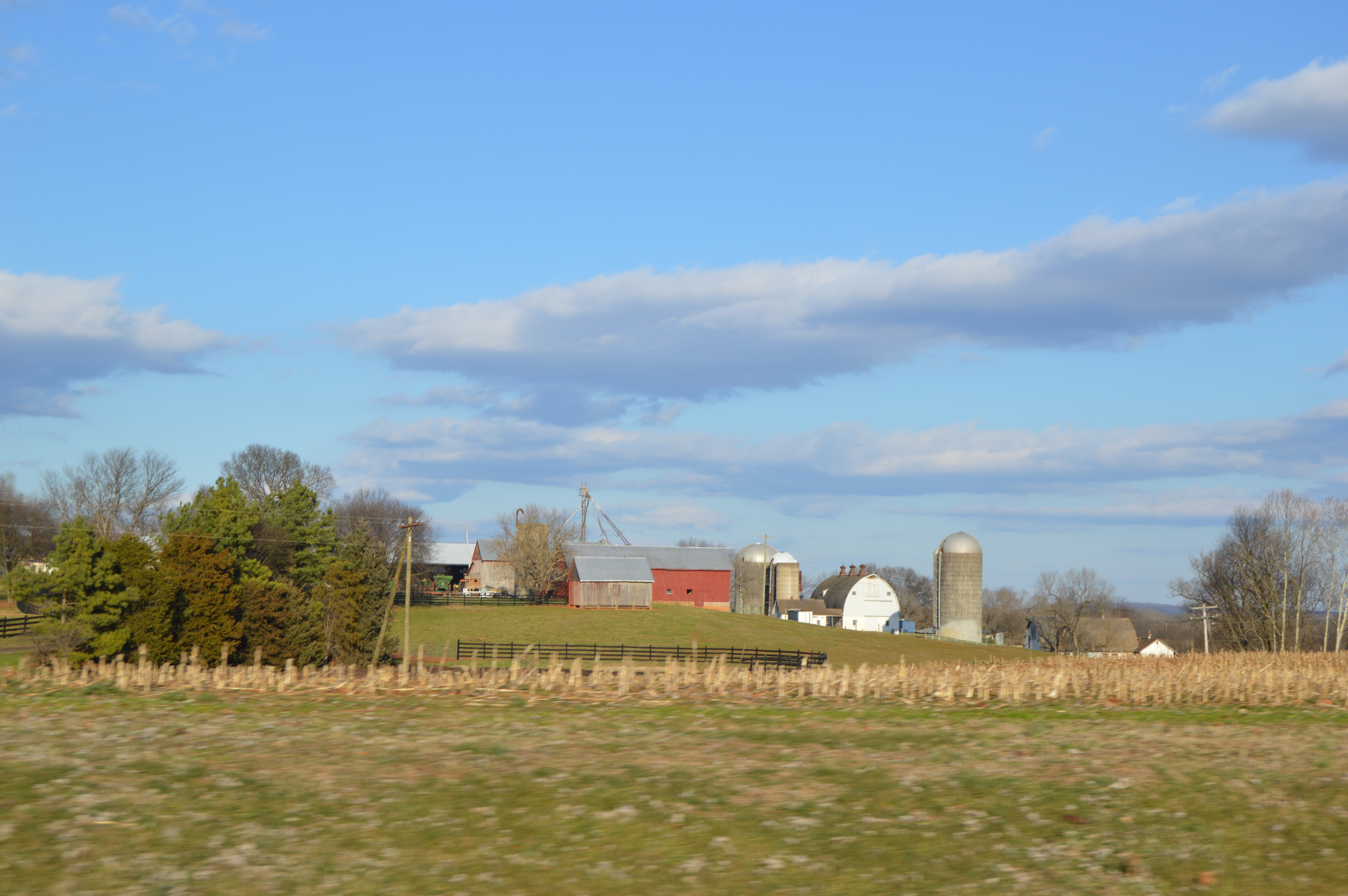
- Overview

- Location within Virginia Location within the United States
- Nearest city: Barboursville, Virginia
- Coordinates: 38.230039°N 78.247379°W
- Area: 780 acres (320 ha)
- Part of: Madison-Barbour Rural Historic District (ID90002115)
- NRHP reference No.: 84003559

Significant dates
- Added to NRHP: August 16, 1984
- Designated CP: January 17, 1991

The Hampstead Farm Archeological District is the site of a significant collection of Native American prehistoric and historic settlement remains in rural Orange County, Virginia. A survey of the farm's 780 acres (320 ha) in 1983 identified 49 different sites of archaeological interest. Sites were found near the adjoining Rapidan River, as well as in upland areas of the farm. Along with sites found at the nearby Montpelier estate, the upland sites demonstrate the significance of that area in Native American occupation patterns. Test pits dug near the river located well-preserved settlement sites at a depth of up to 2 metres (6.6 ft). The farm is also the location of minor military fortifications from the American Civil War.

The Hampstead Farm site was listed as an archeological historic district on the National Register of Historic Places in 1984; the farm was also included as a contributing element to the Madison-Barbour Rural Historic District in 1991, although this was principally for its architectural and scenic merit.

== See also ==
- National Register of Historic Places listings in Orange County, Virginia
