= John Willison (disambiguation) =

John Willison is also the name of:

- John Willison (1680–1750), Scottish Christian minister and author
- Sir John Stephen Willison (1856–1927), Canadian journalist

== See also ==
- John Willison Green (1927–2016), Canadian journalist
