= Barbourville =

Barbourville is the name of several places in the United States of America:

- Barbourville, Kentucky
- Barbourville Commercial District, historic district in Kentucky
- Barbourville, New York, a hamlet

== See also ==
- Barboursville (disambiguation)
