= Orange County Courthouse =

Orange County Courthouse or Old Orange County Courthouse may refer to:

- Old Orange County Courthouse (California), Santa Ana, California
- Orange County Courthouse (Florida), Orlando, Florida
- Old Orange County Courthouse (Florida), Orlando, Florida
- Orange County Courthouse (Indiana), Paoli, Indiana
- Old Orange County Courthouse (North Carolina), Hillsborough, North Carolina
- Orange County Courthouse (Texas), Orange, Texas
- Orange County Courthouse (Virginia), Orange, Virginia
