= Burlington (Barboursville, Virginia) =

Historic house in Virginia, United States

- U.S. National Register of Historic Places
- Virginia Landmarks Register
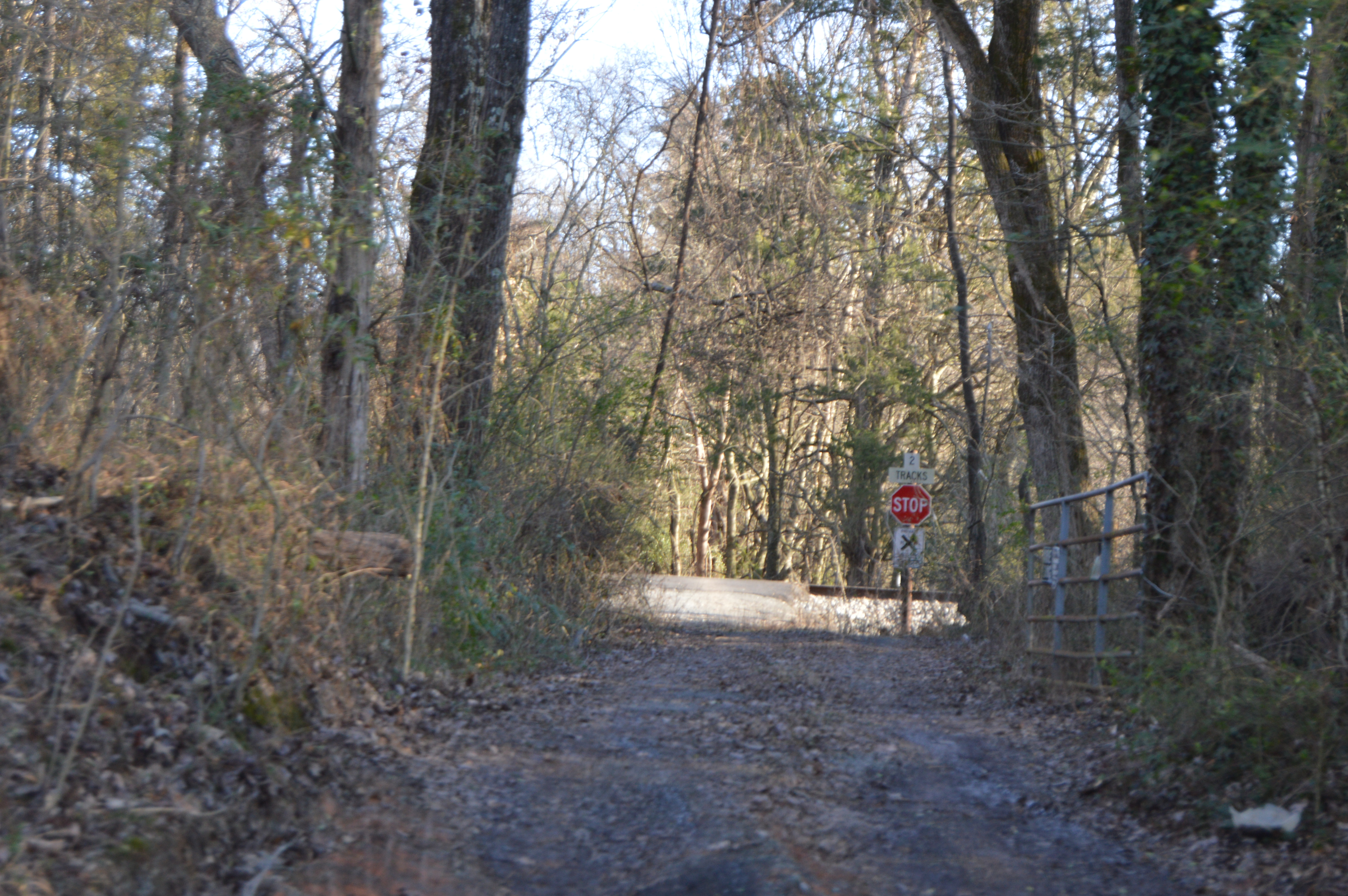
- Property entrance

- Location within Virginia Location within the United States
- Location: 6400 Constitution Hwy., near Barboursville, Virginia
- Coordinates: 38°10′35″N 78°15′35″W
- Area: 200 acres (81 ha)
- Built: 1851-1852
- Built by: William H. Routt; George H. Stockton
- Architectural style: Greek Revival
- NRHP reference No.: 93001458
- VLR No.: 068-0007

Significant dates
- Added to NRHP: January 11, 1994
- Designated VLR: October 20, 1993

Burlington is a historic plantation house located near Barboursville, Orange County, Virginia. The main house was built in 1851–1852, and is a two-story, three-bay, T-shaped residence with a shallow hipped roof in the Greek Revival style. It has a traditional I-house plan with an ell addition. The front facade features a portico with six Greek Ionic order columns with a plain entablature. It has a Jeffersonian Chinese lattice balcony cantilevered on the second floor. The exterior and interior detailing is derived almost entirely from Asher Benjamin's The Practical House Carpenter, 1830 edition. The house was built by James Barbour Newman, nephew of Governor James Barbour.

It was listed on the National Register of Historic Places in 1994.
