= Mount Sharon =

Historic house in Virginia, United States

- U.S. National Register of Historic Places
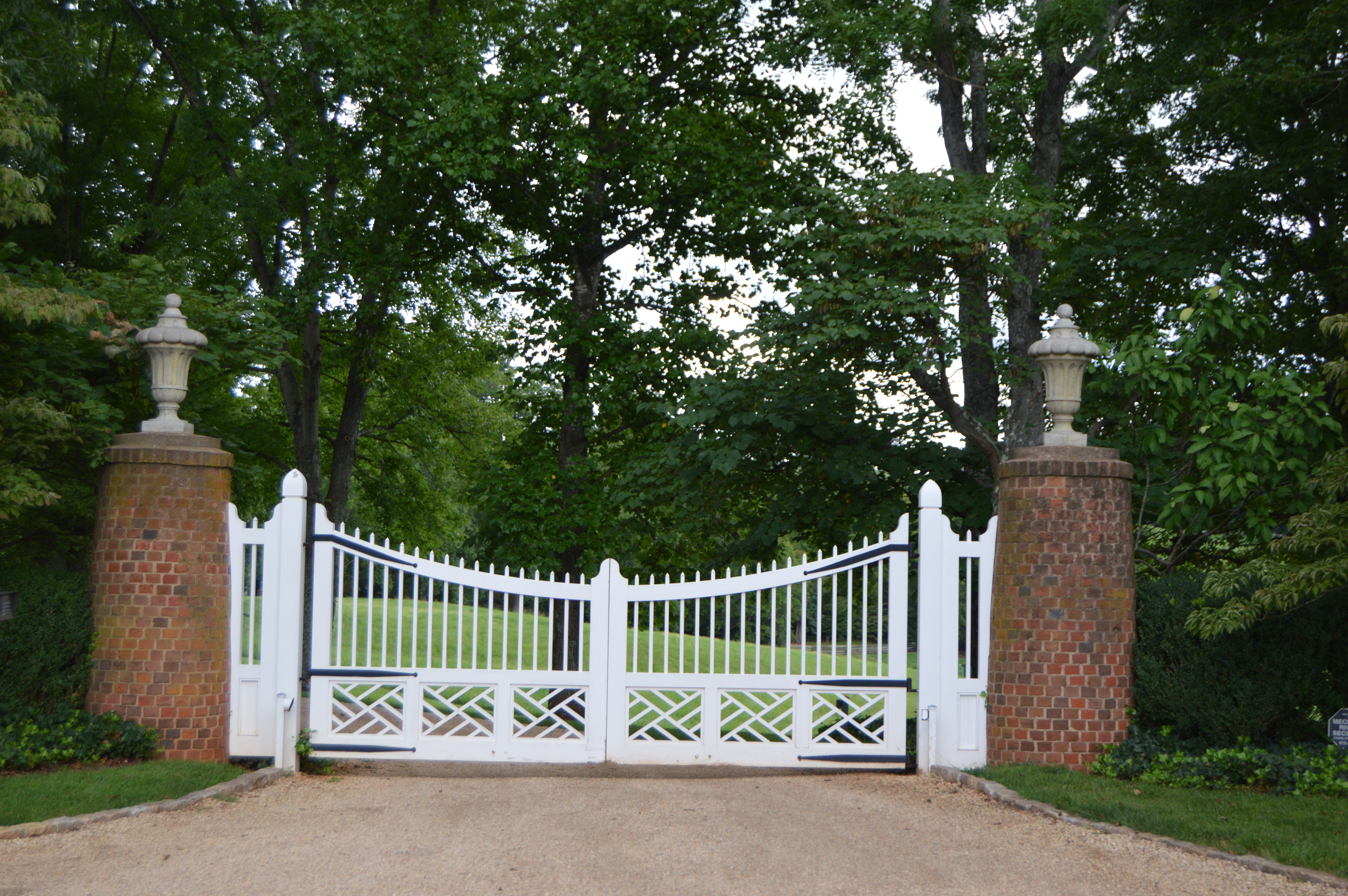
- Property entrance

- Location within Virginia Location within the United States
- Nearest city: Orange, Virginia
- Coordinates: 38.267567°N 78.038786°W
- Area: 77.5 acres (31.4 ha)
- Built: 1937
- Architect: Louis Lafarge
- NRHP reference No.: 13000710
- Added to NRHP: September 9, 2013

Mount Sharon is an historic estate house and plantation remnant in rural Orange County, Virginia. Located off Route 600 about 4 miles (6.4 km) northeast of the city of Orange, the Mount Sharon estate house is a two-story Georgian Revival house built of concrete and faced in brick. It was designed in 1937 by Louis Bancel LaFarge for Mr. and Mrs. Ellsworth Augustus, on a plantation they purchased in 1935 from the Taliaferro family, which had owned it since the early 18th century. The Augustuses demolished the deteriorating Victorian-era plantation house on the site to build the house, which has restrained exterior styling, and high quality interior woodwork designed by LaFarge.

The property, consisting of the estate house, several outbuildings from the 1930s, and 77.5 acres (31.4 ha) of surrounding land (reduced from the more than 1,000 that made up the original plantation), was listed on the National Register of Historic Places in 2013.

== See also ==
- National Register of Historic Places listings in Orange County, Virginia
