= Mount Calvary Baptist Church =

Historic church in Virginia, United States

- U.S. National Register of Historic Places
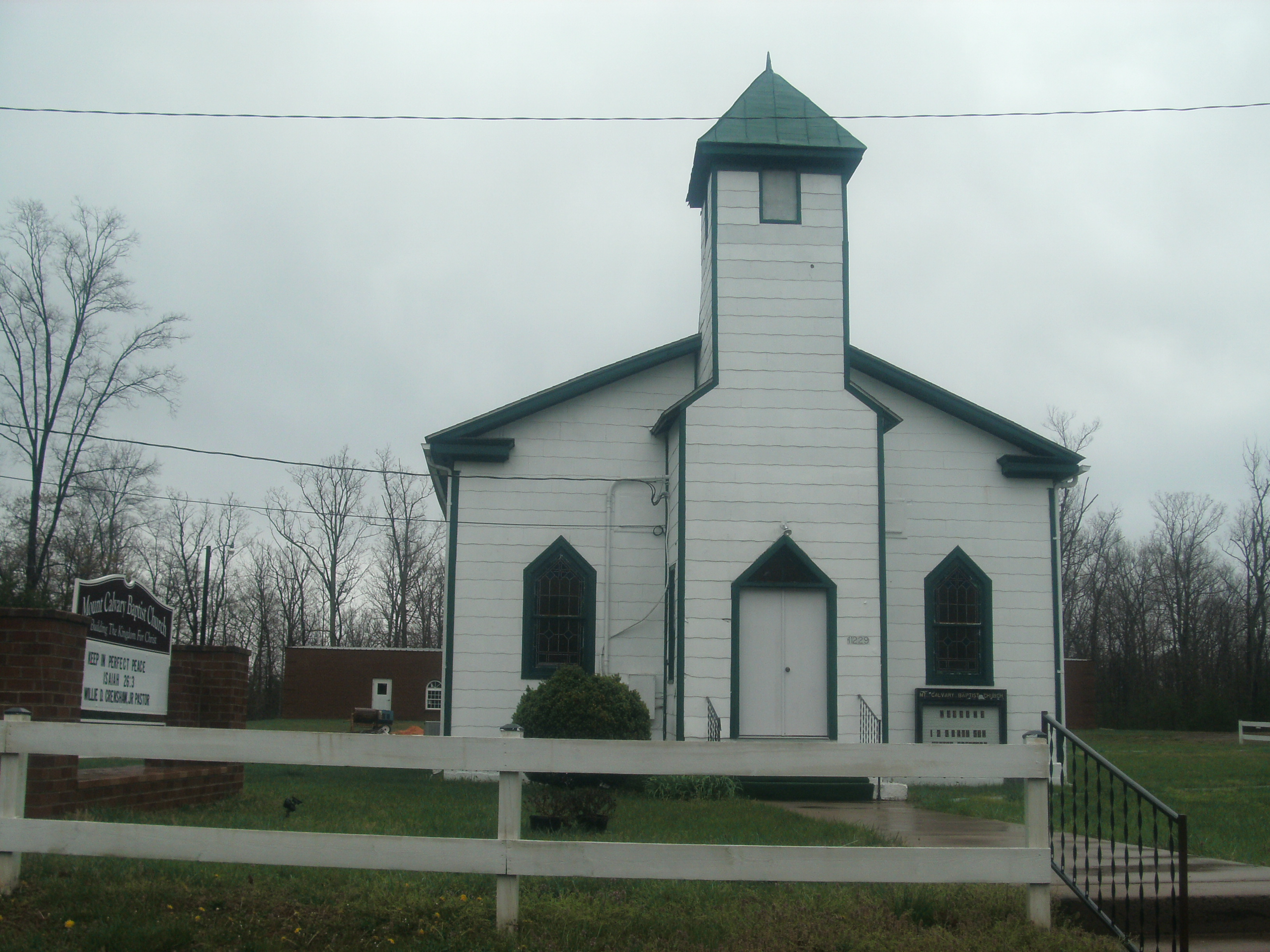
- View of church, April 2017

- Location within Virginia Location within the United States
- Location: 11229 Kendall Rd., Orange, Virginia
- Coordinates: 38°15′3″N 78°1′7″W
- Area: less than one acre
- Built: 1892
- Architectural style: Late Gothic Revival
- NRHP reference No.: 16000799
- Added to NRHP: November 22, 2016

The Mount Calvary Baptist Church is a historic church at 11229 Kendall Road in Orange, Virginia. Built in 1892, it is a well-preserved example of a rural church built for African-Americans during the Jim Crow era. It is a frame structure with a metal roof and a projecting square tower topped by a pyramidal roof. The main entrance is at the center of the tower, set in a pointed-arch opening, matching those of windows on the facade on either side. Also on the property is a graveyard, established about 1919, with about 100 marked graves.

The building was added to the National Register of Historic Places in 2016.

== See also ==
- National Register of Historic Places listings in Orange County, Virginia
