= Berryhill =

Berryhill may refer to:

== People ==
- Bill Berryhill (born 1958), American politician, son of Clare Berryhill
- Bob Berryhill (born 1947), guitarist and founding member of The Surfaris
- Cindy Lee Berryhill (born 1965), American singer and songwriter
- Clare Berryhill (1925–1996), American politician, father of Bill and Tom Berryhill
- Damon Berryhill (born 1963), American former Major League Baseball catcher
- Frieda Berryhill (1922–2012), American anti-nuclear and peace activist
- Peggy Berryhill, Native American broadcast journalist
- Tom Berryhill (1953–2020), American politician, son of Clare Berryhill
- Stanley Berryhill (born 1998), American football player

== Places ==
- Berryhill, Oklahoma, United States, a small community
- Berryhill Fields, grasslands in Stoke-on-Trent, England

== See also ==
- Berry Hill (disambiguation)
