= St. Thomas Church (Orange, Virginia) =

Historic church in Virginia, US

- U.S. National Register of Historic Places
- U.S. Historic district – Contributing property
- Virginia Landmarks Register
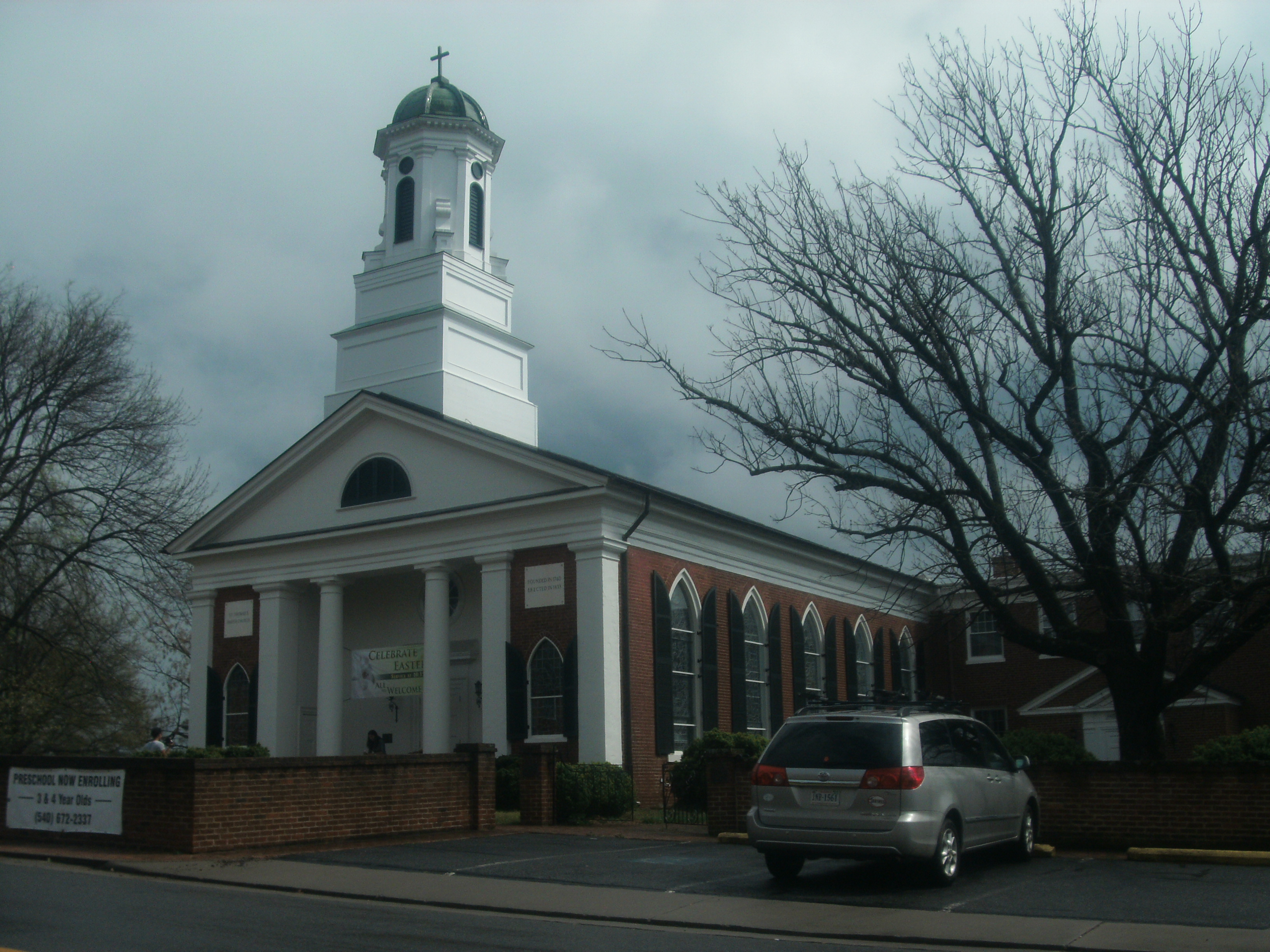
- View of church, April 2017

- Location within Virginia Location within the United States
- Location: 119 Caroline St., Orange, Virginia
- Coordinates: 38°14′37″N 78°6′49″W
- Area: less than one acre
- Built: 1833-1834, 1853, 1912, 1928
- Built by: Phillips, William B.
- Architect: Jefferson, Thomas
- Architectural style: Jeffersonian
- Part of: Orange Commercial Historic District (ID98001651)
- NRHP reference No.: 76002115
- VLR No.: 275-0008

Significant dates
- Added to NRHP: December 6, 1976
- Designated CP: January 21, 1999
- Designated VLR: February 17, 1976

St. Thomas Church is a historic Episcopal church located at Orange, Virginia, United States. It is a rectangular brick structure measuring 40 feet wide and 105 feet deep. The front facade features a recessed portico with two Doric columns flanked by two Doric pilasters. Atop the gable roof is a three-stage tower topped by an octagonal cupola. The original church building was built in 1833–1834, and measured approximately 40 feet wide and 65 feet deep. It was built by William B. Philips, a master mason employed by Thomas Jefferson during the construction of the University of Virginia. It was enlarged and improved in 1853, and enlarged again in 1912. In 1928, the rear addition was raised to a full two stories and a parish hall constructed. The original church is believed to have been based on the plans by Thomas Jefferson for Christ Church in Charlottesville, Virginia. That church was demolished in 1895.

It was added to the National Register of Historic Places in 1976. It is located in the Orange Commercial Historic District.
