= Williston (surname) =

Williston is a surname. Notable people with the name include:

- David Williston (1868–1962), American landscape architect
- Edward Bancroft Williston (1837–1920), officer in the United States Army
- George H. Williston (1818–1881), American state and territorial legislator
- Lorenzo P. Williston (1815–1887), American lawyer and politician
- Ray Gillis Williston (1914–2006), Canadian educator and politician
- Samuel Wendell Williston (1851–1918), American paleontologist
- Samuel Williston (1861–1963), American lawyer
