= Barbourville Commercial District =

Historic district in Kentucky, United States

- U.S. National Register of Historic Places
- U.S. Historic district
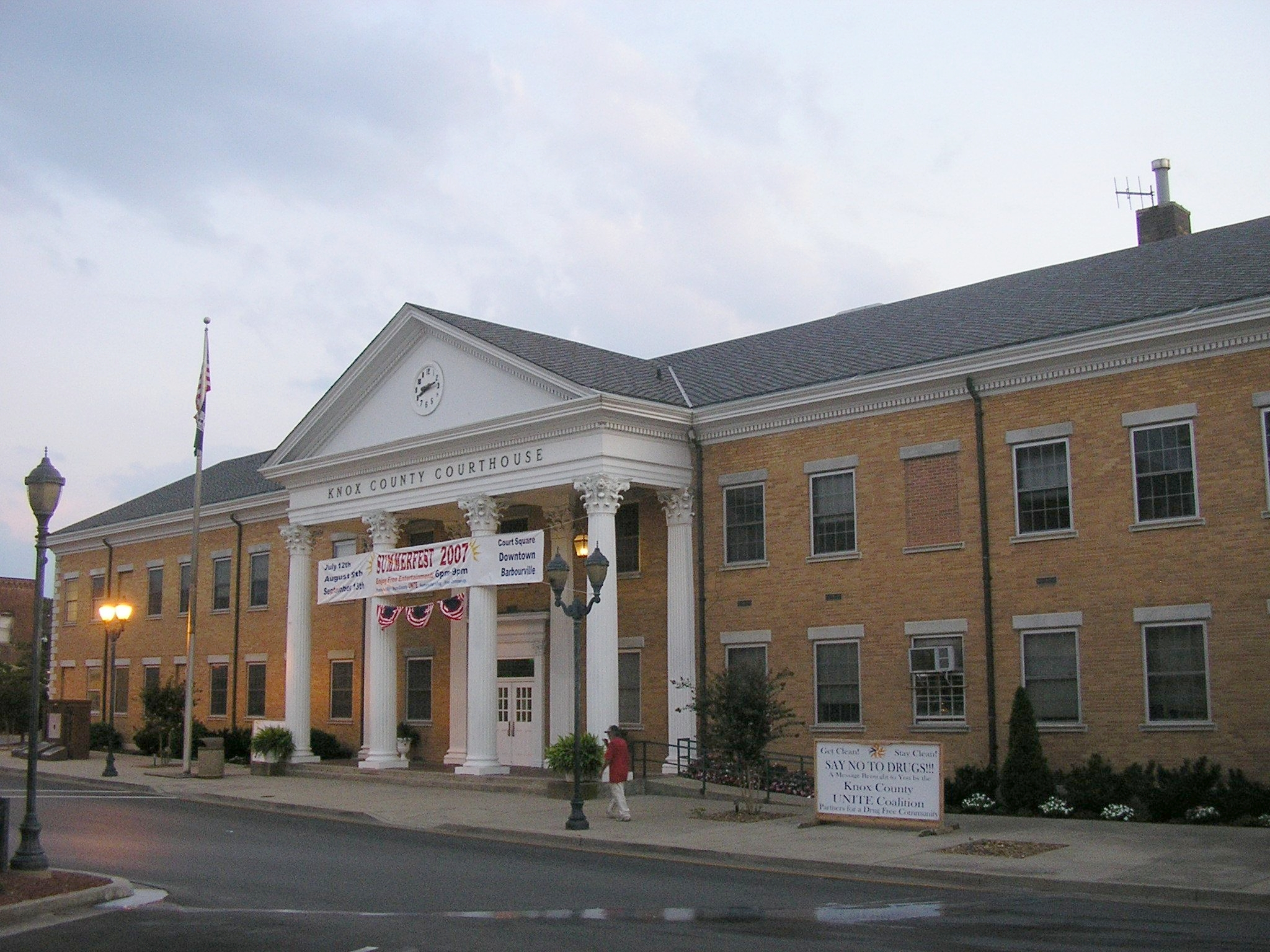
- Knox County Courthouse in 2007

- Location within Kentucky Location within the United States
- Location: Roughly bounded by Daniel Boone Dr., Liberty, High and Jail Sts., Barbourville, Kentucky
- Coordinates: 36°51′57″N 83°53′19″W
- Area: 6 acres (2.4 ha)
- Architectural style: Late Victorian
- NRHP reference No.: 84003885
- Added to NRHP: August 2, 1984

The Barbourville Commercial District is a 6 acres (2.4 ha) historic district which was listed on the National Register of Historic Places in 1984. It included 32 contributing buildings in the core of the historic downtown of Barbourville, Kentucky.

The district is roughly bounded by Daniel Boone Dr., Liberty, High, and Jail Streets. It includes the Knox County Courthouse.
