= Orange Commercial Historic District =

Historic district in Virginia, United States

- U.S. National Register of Historic Places
- U.S. Historic district
- Virginia Landmarks Register
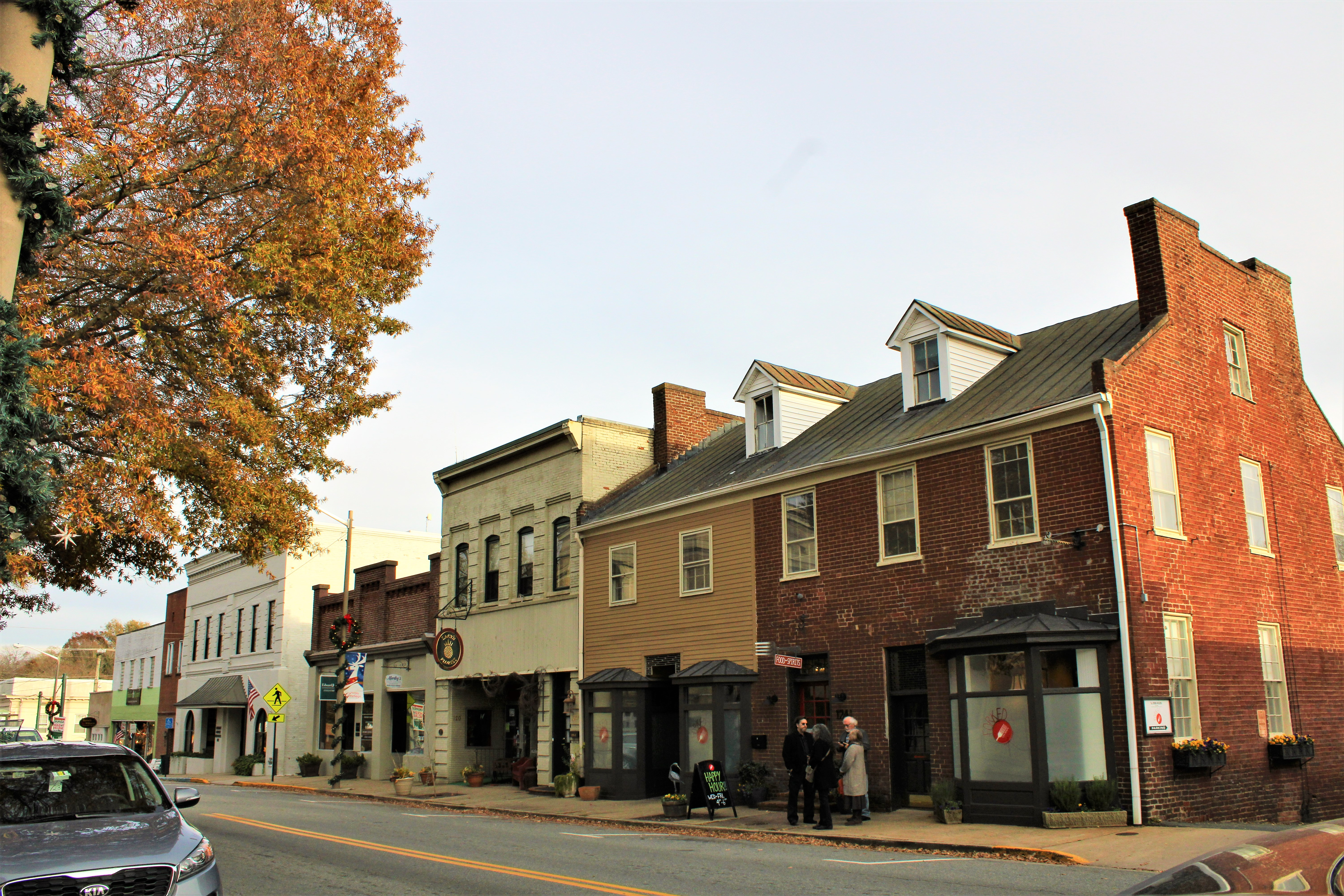

- Location within Virginia Location within the United States
- Location: Roughly along Madison and Main Sts., Orange, Virginia
- Coordinates: 38°14′40″N 78°06′42″W
- Area: 20 acres (8.1 ha)
- Built: 1749
- Built by: Phillips, William B.; et al.
- Architectural style: Early Commercial, Italianate
- NRHP reference No.: 98001651
- VLR No.: 275-5001

Significant dates
- Added to NRHP: January 21, 1999
- Designated VLR: December 10, 1998

Orange Commercial Historic District is a national historic district located at Orange, Orange County, Virginia. One of Virginia's Main Street communities, it encompasses 61 contributing buildings in the central business district of Orange's county seat.

== History ==
While the courthouse maintains records dating back to the county's formation in 1734, almost all the buildings were built after formal incorporation of "Orange Court House" as a town in 1872. The town's name was shortened in 1890.

Especially after the American Civil War, during which many Confederate convalesced in Orange, the town grew as a railroad center. The Orange and Alexandria Railroad (begun in 1850), which connected in Gordonsville, Virginia to a railroad from Charlottesville and Lynchburg into Richmond, for decades was the main transportation link between Washington, D.C. and Richmond. The town experienced a devastating fire on November 8, 1908, which led to an economic decline. However, by 1930 the area had adopted to the increasingly popular automobile, with many dealers, related industry and tourism.

The district's 19th- and early 20th-century residential, commercial and institutional buildings show various popular architectural styles, especially the Italianate. Notable buildings include Peliso (c. 1806), Sparks Building (c. 1830), Holladay House (c. 1830), Miles B. Lipscomb Store (1853), Nazareth Baptist Church (1913), Masonic Opera House (1885, 1921–1922), Trinity United Methodist Church (1892), former National Bank of Orange (1892), former Citizens National Bank (1925), Levy's Busy Corner (1908), and the Southern Railway Depot (1908). Located in the district but previously (and separately) listed are the Orange County Courthouse and St. Thomas Church.

It was listed on the National Register of Historic Places in 1999.
