= Montpelier Station, Virginia =

Unincorporated community in Virginia, United States

- Unincorporated community
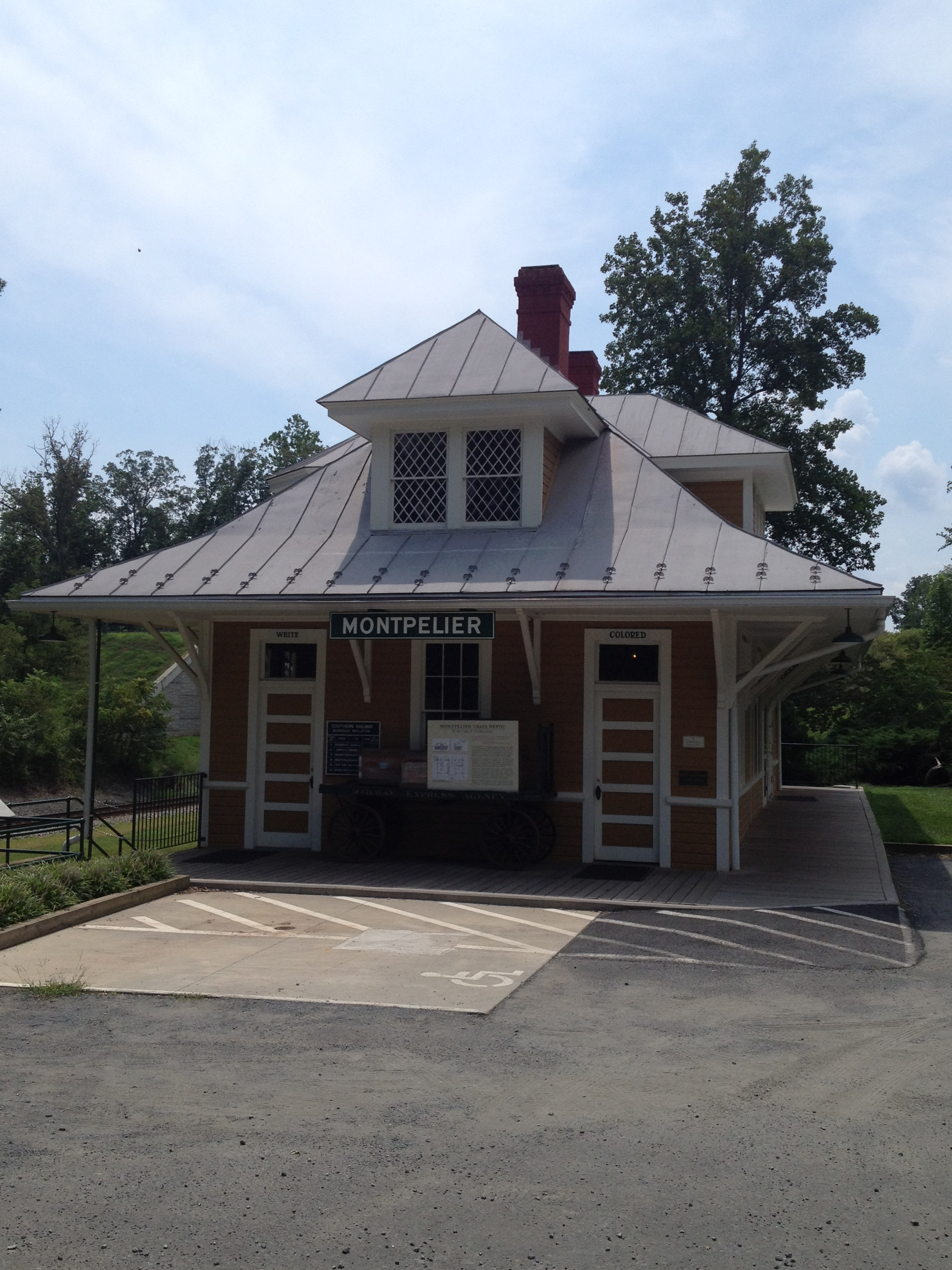
- The Montpelier Station Rail Depot Museum and US Post Office

- Location within Virginia Location within the United States
- Coordinates: 38°13′41″N 78°10′36″W
- Country: United States
- State: Virginia
- County: Orange
- Elevation: 492 ft (150 m)
- Time zone: UTC-5 (Eastern (EST))
  - Summer (DST): UTC-4 (EDT)
- ZIP code: 22957
- Area code: 540
- GNIS feature ID: 1470693

Montpelier Station is an unincorporated community in Orange County, Virginia, United States. Montpelier Station is located along Virginia State Route 20 3.5 miles (5.6 km) west-southwest of Orange. Montpelier Station has a post office with ZIP code 22957.

The community is home to a historic railroad depot, which opened in 1910 and became an exhibit at James Madison's Montpelier estate in 2010. Rockwood, a house listed on the National Register of Historic Places, is also located in Montpelier Station.

== Montpelier Station railroad depot ==
William du Pont purchased the Montpelier Estate in 1901 and paid to have a train depot built there to bring in supplies and for his weekly travel to Wilmington, Delaware for business. The station was designed by the Southern Railway Company using one of its standard floor plans, which called for segregated waiting rooms. The "White" waiting room measured 14 feet wide by 15.6 feet long. The "Colored" waiting room measured 9 feet long by 15.6 feet wide. Signs for "Colored" and "White" were installed over each door. Both waiting rooms were served by a single ticket office, which had two windows that intersected both rooms at an angle.

Freight service began in 1911 and ceased in 1962. Passenger service began in 1912 and cased in 1929, after which time the time postal area on the first floor was enlarged.

Following the death of Marion du Pont Scott in 1983, the Montpelier Estate was passed to the National Trust for Historic Preservation. In 2008, the Montpelier Foundation undertook a renovation of the Depot, restoring it to its original 1910s appearance in order to document this period of legalized segregation in Virginia and educate the public about the Jim Crow era. On February 21, 2010, the restored Depot reopened with a new exhibition inside, "The Montpelier Train Depot: In the Time of Segregation." The building housed the Montpelier Station post office prior to October 2008 and from August 2009 to June 2022.
