= Barboursville Vineyards =

Winery and Barboursville, Virginia, US

- Location: Barboursville, Virginia, USA
- Coordinates: 38°9′36″N 78°16′37″W
- Appellation: Monticello AVA
- Founded: 1976
- Key people: Gianni Zonin, founder Luca Paschina, head winemaker and CEO
- Parent company: Zonin
- Cases/yr: 35,000
- Known for: Octagon
- Varietals: Cabernet Franc, Cabernet Sauvignon, Merlot, Nebbiolo, Sangiovese, Barbera, Petit Verdot, Pinot noir, Chardonnay
- Tasting: Open to the Public, small fee required
- Website: www.BBVwine.com

Barboursville Vineyards is a winery located in the Piedmont region of the Commonwealth of Virginia in the unincorporated community of Barboursville, Virginia. It is located within both the Virginia and Monticello viticultural areas.

== History ==
The wine producing estate was founded in 1976 by Gianni Zonin, an Italian winemaker from the Veneto. Part of an affiliated group of wineries owned by Zonin based in Vicenza, Barboursville Vineyards is its only American venture.

The winery is built on the grounds of Barboursville, the home of the 19th Governor of the Commonwealth of Virginia, James Barbour, on an estate of 870 acres (350 ha) which is divided between Albemarle County and Orange County. The home was built from 1814 through 1822 and is based on an architectural design provided by Barbour's political ally and friend, Thomas Jefferson, since 1969 listed on the National Register of Historic Places. It draws approximately 80,000 visitors a year.

The estate is the first producer in the new era of Virginian wine history to plant Vitis vinifera since the failed attempts of Jefferson, initially through former vineyard manager Gabriele Rausse. Winery manager Luca Paschina first arrived as a consultant in 1990, now estimated among Virginia's leading winemakers, has a stated goal to work to achieve quality consistently over several vintages.

Considered one of the leading wineries in Virginia, Barboursville Vineyards wine was selected to be served to the Queen Elizabeth II on her 2007 visit to Virginia.

In March 2026, after a long period in which the winery was rumored to be for sale, it was announced that an undisclosed investor group had purchased the winery. Head winemaker Luca Paschina remains in his role as CEO.

== Production ==
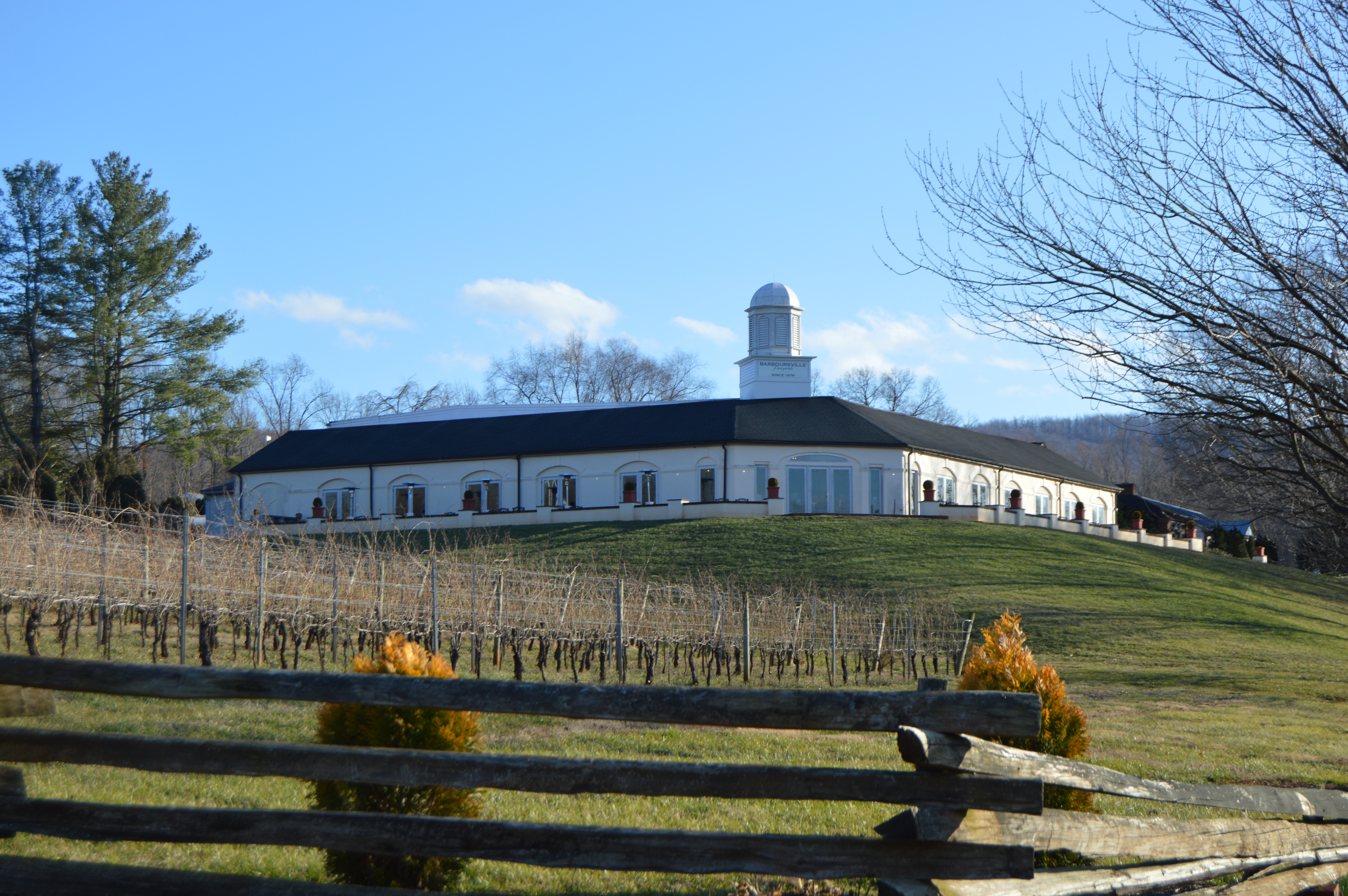
Offices and tasting room

The viticultural area extends 120 acres (49 ha). The vines are predominantly Bordeaux grape varieties for the red wines, and also including Nebbiolo, Sangiovese and Barbera, and among white varieties are Viognier, Chardonnay, Pinot grigio and Sauvignon blanc.

The Barboursville Vineyards flagship wine, Octagon, is a Bordeaux-style blend, mainly based on Merlot, with parts Cabernet Sauvignon, Cabernet Franc and Petit Verdot. Octagon was first produced in 1991, then again in 1995, but 1998 marks the vintage that began the run of consistency, with the exception of the 2003 vintage when no Octagon was produced.

Among a host of other wines produced, there is a Barbera Reserve, a Cabernet Franc Reserve, a Cabernet Sauvignon, a Merlot, a Nebbiolo Reserve, a Sangiovese Reserve and a Vintage Rosé. Among white wines there is a sparkling Barboursville Brut NV, a Chardonnay, Pinot grigio, Sauvignon blanc and a Viognier Reserve, and a late harvest dessert wine produced from Moscato Ottonel and Vidal grapes, the Malvaxia Passito whose character has been commended by British wine writer Hugh Johnson.

Barboursville Vineyards has a total production of 35,000 cases (3,100 hl; 83,000 US gal) of wine a year.
