= Somerset Christian Church =

Historic church in Virginia, United States

- U.S. National Register of Historic Places
- Virginia Landmarks Register
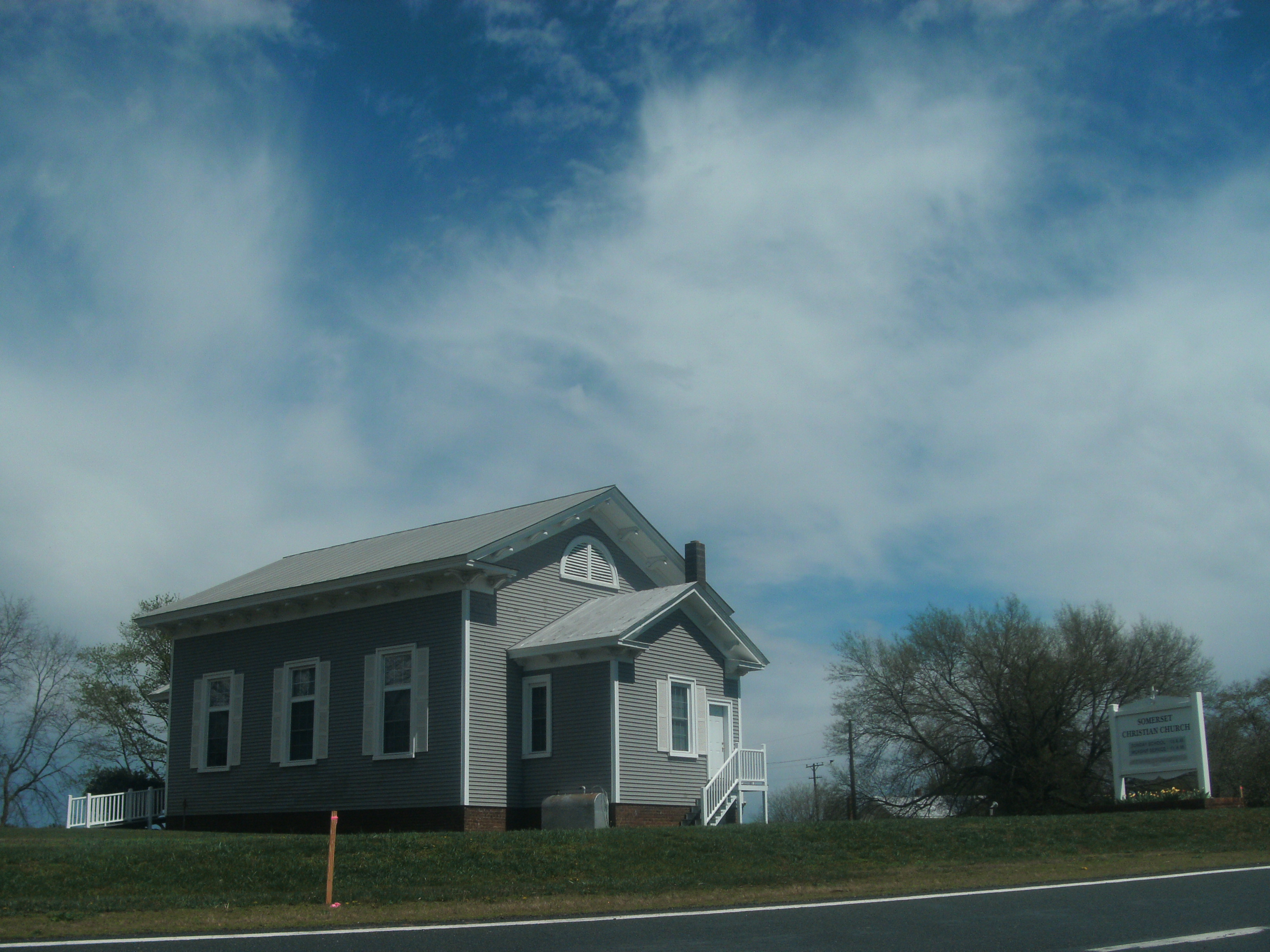
- Somerset Christian Church, April 2017

- Location within Virginia Location within the United States
- Location: VA 20, Old Somerset, Virginia
- Coordinates: 38°13′34″N 78°13′29″W
- Area: less than one acre
- Built: c. 1850
- Architectural style: Italianate Style
- NRHP reference No.: 79003061
- VLR No.: 068-0080

Significant dates
- Added to NRHP: February 28, 1979
- Designated VLR: September 19, 1978

Somerset Christian Church is a historic Christian church located near Old Somerset, Orange County, Virginia. It was built about 1850, and is an Italianate style, rectangular wood-frame building It features a one-story porch of four square Tuscan order columns supporting a pedimented roof. The interior consists of a single auditorium room with a gallery at the north end.

It was added to the National Register of Historic Places in 1979.
