= James J. Barbour =

American politician and lawyer (1869–1946)

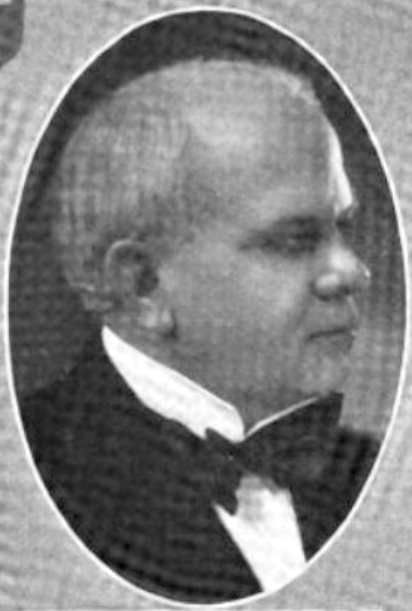

Member of the Illinois House of Representatives
- In office 1940–1944

Member of the Illinois Senate
- In office 1916–1938

Personal details
- Born: James Joseph Barbour; December 28, 1869 Hartford, Connecticut, US
- Died: March 29, 1946 (aged 76) Evanston, Illinois, US
- Party: Republican
- Occupation: Lawyer, politician
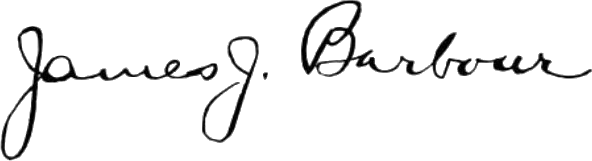
- Signature

James Joseph Barbour (December 28, 1869 – March 29, 1946) was an American politician and lawyer.

== Biography ==
Barbour was born in Hartford, Connecticut. He worked in the newspaper business and was involved in public speaking in Camden, New Jersey. He studied law in a law office in Chicago, Illinois and at Lake Forest University. Barbour was admitted to the Illinois bar in 1891. He practiced law in Evanston, Illinois. Barbour served in the Illinois Senate from 1917 to 1937 and was a Republican. Barbour then served in the Illinois House of Representatives from 1941 to 1943. Barbour died from heart disease in Evanston, Illinois.
