= Berry Hill (New York) =

Mountain in New York, United States

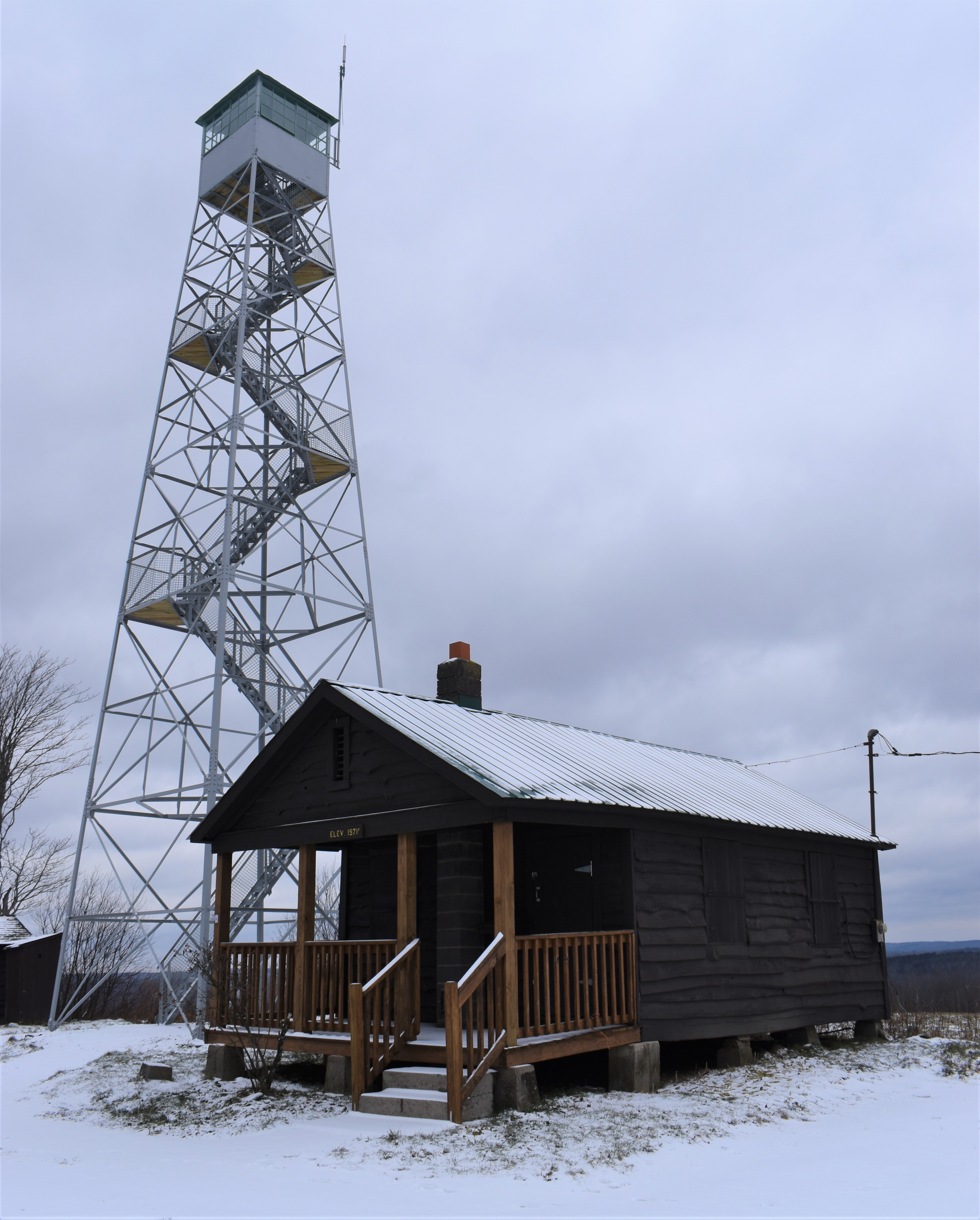
- Berry Hill fire tower and cabin in December 2021

Highest point
- Elevation: 1,962 feet (598 m)
- Coordinates: 42°32′59″N 75°41′25″W

Geography
- Location within New York Adirondack Park Location within the United States
- Location: Chenango County, New York, U.S.
- Topo map: USGS East Pharsalia

Berry Hill is a 1,962-foot-tall (598 m) mountain in the Central New York region of New York. It is located west-northwest of Norwich in Chenango County. The Berry Hill Fire Observation Station is located on top of the mountain. The fire tower was built by the Civilian Conservation Corps in 1934. The tower ceased operation in 1988 and was officially closed early in 1989. In 1993, the tower was placed on the National Historic Lookout Register. The tower was refurbished and opened to the public on September 13, 2021. The walk to the tower is a few hundred yards and 79 steps to the lookout platform on top.

== History ==
The structure on Berry Hill, a 59-foot-3-inch-tall (18.06 m) International Derrick tower, was provided to New York State by the United States Forest Service and built by the Civilian Conservation Corps in 1934. It was built to look over newly reforested state lands that were susceptible to fire, and was first staffed in 1935. The tower ceased operation in 1988 and was officially closed early in 1989. In 1993, the tower was placed on the National Historic Lookout Register.

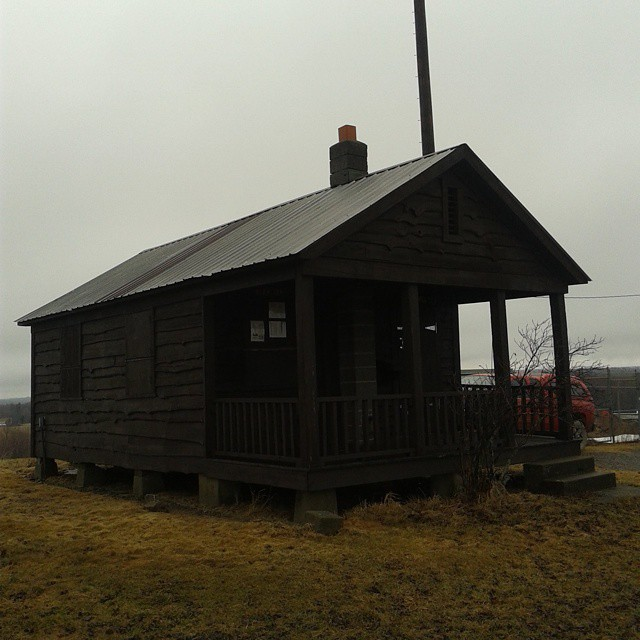
Ranger's cabin by tower in 2015

In September 2021, a $125,000 project was completed to rehabilitate the fire tower. All communication equipment was removed, then a new roof and new siding was placed on the observers cabin. Safety fencing was added to the stairwell, as well as new metal grate treads and wood landings. A new wood floor and entrance hatch, new map table, and new windows were installed in the cabin. The tower was officially opened to the public on September 13, 2021.
