= Rockwood (Montpelier Station, Virginia) =

Historic house in Virginia, United States

- U.S. National Register of Historic Places
- Virginia Landmarks Register
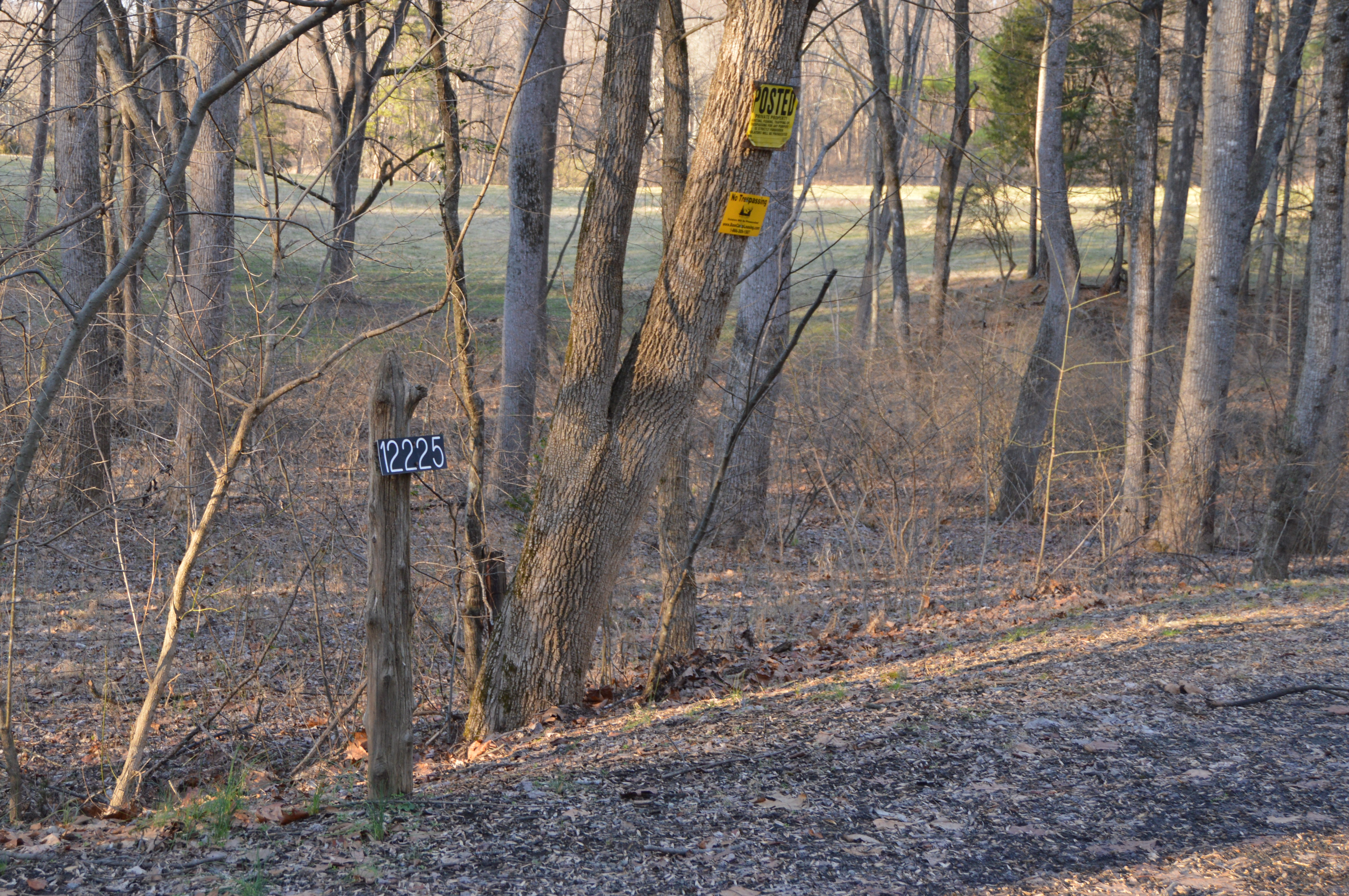
- Property entrance

- Location within Virginia Location within the United States
- Location: 12225 Chicken Mountain Rd., near Montpelier Station, Virginia
- Coordinates: 38°12′31″N 78°9′40″W
- Area: 296.5 acres (120.0 ha)
- Built: 1848
- Architectural style: Gothic Revival
- NRHP reference No.: 01000695
- VLR No.: 068-0051

Significant dates
- Added to NRHP: July 5, 2001
- Designated VLR: March 14, 2001

Rockwood is a historic house in the vicinity of Montpelier Station, Orange County, Virginia. It was built in 1848 and is a 2 1/2-story frame house which was designed in a blend of the Gothic Revival and Greek Revival styles. The house sits on a brick English basement and has an offset sharply pitched cross-gable roof.

It was added to the National Register of Historic Places on July 5, 2001.
