= James Barbour =

American politician (1775–1842)

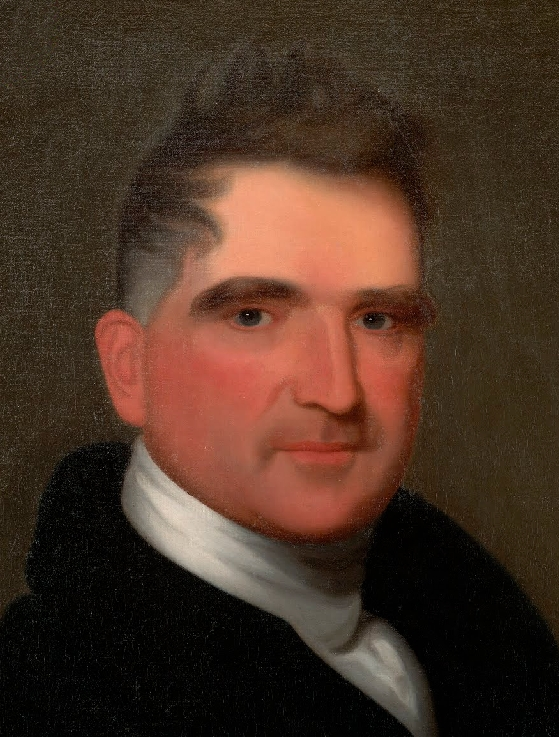
- Portrait by Chester Harding, c. 1822

11th United States Minister to the United Kingdom
- In office November 24, 1828 – October 1, 1829
- President: John Quincy Adams; Andrew Jackson
- Preceded by: William Beach Lawrence (acting)
- Succeeded by: Louis McLane

11th United States Secretary of War
- In office March 7, 1825 – May 23, 1828
- President: John Quincy Adams
- Preceded by: John C. Calhoun
- Succeeded by: Peter Buell Porter

President pro tempore of the United States Senate
- In office February 15, 1819 – December 26, 1819
- Preceded by: John Gaillard
- Succeeded by: John Gaillard

United States Senator from Virginia
- In office January 2, 1815 – March 7, 1825
- Preceded by: Richard Brent
- Succeeded by: John Randolph

18th Governor of Virginia
- In office January 3, 1812 – December 1, 1814
- Preceded by: Peyton Randolph (acting)
- Succeeded by: Wilson Cary Nicholas

Speaker of the Virginia House of Delegates
- In office December 1, 1809 – January 3, 1812
- Preceded by: Hugh Nelson
- Succeeded by: Andrew Stevenson

Member of the Virginia House of Delegates from Orange County
- In office 1807-1812
- In office 1804-1805
- In office 1798-1803

Personal details
- Born: June 10, 1775 Barboursville, Virginia, British America
- Died: June 7, 1842 (aged 66) Barboursville, Virginia, U.S.
- Party: Democratic-Republican (Before 1825); National Republican (1825–1834); Whig (1834–1842)
- Spouse: Lucy Johnson (m.1792)
- Children: 7

James C. Barbour (June 10, 1775 – June 7, 1842) was an American politician, planter, and lawyer. He served as a delegate from Orange County, Virginia, in the Virginia General Assembly and as speaker of the Virginia House of Delegates. He was the 18th governor of Virginia and the first Governor to reside in the current Virginia Governor's Mansion. After the War of 1812, Barbour became a U.S. Senator serving from 1815 to 1825 and the United States Secretary of War from 1825 to 1828.

== Early and family life ==
James C. Barbour was born in what became Barboursville in Orange County on June 10, 1775. Barbour was the son of Thomas Barbour (who held a seat in the Virginia House of Burgesses in 1769) and his wife, Mary Pendleton Thomas. His grandfather (also James Barbour, 1707–1775) had patented lands in Spotsylvania County in 1731 and 1733, and his uncle of the same name James Barbour also served in the Virginia House of Burgesses (1761–65, representing Spotsylvania County). Both sides of his family were among the First Families of Virginia and early settlers in Orange County and westward. By the time James was born, the Barbour family had owned over 2,000 acres (8 km^{2}) and enslaved several people. However, the family suffered financial reverses during the American Revolutionary War and its aftermath. Nonetheless, James finished his formal education with private tutors and an academy run by James Waddel at Gordonsville, Virginia. His brother, Philip P. Barbour, would later become Speaker of the United States House of Representatives and Associate Justice of the Supreme Court.

On October 29, 1792, Barbour married Lucy Johnson, the daughter of Benjamin Johnson, who had represented Orange County in the General Assembly in 1790. They had three daughters (one of whom, Frances, died as an infant in 1802); the second, Frances Cornelia, married William Collins of Baltimore. They also had four sons, including James Barbour and Benjamin Johnson Barbour (1821–1894, later rector of the University of Virginia).

== Career ==
=== Early years ===
Barbour served as deputy sheriff of Orange County beginning in 1792. In 1794, he was admitted to the Virginia Bar. With wedding gifts from his father, as well as by building his legal practice and running his plantation, Barbour was able to build up personal wealth. His friend and neighbor at Monticello plantation, Thomas Jefferson, helped design the mansion in which Barbour lived most of his adult life, called Barboursville. By 1798, Barbour owned several enslaved people and would expand that plantation over the years, as would his somewhat neighbor on the other side, President James Madison at Montpelier plantation.

=== House of Delegates ===
Orange County voters elected Barbour to the Virginia House of Delegates in 1796, and he became that body's youngest member. Reelected several times to that part-time position, he served until 1804 and again from 1807 to 1812. Barbour became known for eloquence, and served on various committees, rising to chairman of several, including the Committee of Privileges and Elections and the Finance Committee. Peers elected him as Speaker of the House of Delegates for many terms.

Barbour held strong Republican beliefs, similar to his neighbors Jefferson and Madison. He vigorously opposed the Alien and Sedition Acts of 1798 and used his rhetorical eloquence to support the Virginia Resolutions. Barbour believed the Acts and their supporters threatened the United States, stating, "to make an expected attack from abroad a pretext for attacking the principles of liberty at home has drawn aside the curtain and clearly illuminated for all who are willing to see." Barbour refused to support legislation increasing Executive powers, especially unchecked powers.

In the House of Delegates, Barbour took pride in writing the bill establishing the Literary Fund of Virginia, passed on February 2, 1810. This provided some funding for public education in each county in the Commonwealth. Barbour later requested that the only inscription on his tombstone be a reference to this Act, affirming his firm belief that society would progress only through education. However, he also believed intellectual abilities were connected with gender, race, and land ownership.

=== Governor of Virginia ===
In 1811, Barbour declared his candidacy for the governorship but lost to the incumbent, George William Smith. However, Smith died in office on December 26, 1811, during a fire at the Richmond Theatre. On January 3, the Legislature convened and elected Barbour governor. At the time, British raiders were impressing American sailors (including Virginians, especially near Hampton Roads and Norfolk). Barbour favored war with Britain, which he viewed as the only way to end British interference with U.S. sovereignty. Barbour's father had trained the Orange militia, so the new Governor knew their inadequacies. Governor Barbour sought funding for Virginia's militia on February 11, 1812, and personally toured the tidewater region most at risk.

On June 18, 1812, Congress declared war, so the War of 1812 began, and Barbour became "the war governor." Perhaps because of his wartime preparations (or willingness to risk his funds), Barbour faced no opposition and was reelected Governor in November 1812. However, by 1813, British ships had been raiding coastal Virginia. Some delegates opposed Barbour's support of President James Madison and national unity but nonetheless reelected him. In 1814, Barbour finally convinced the Legislature to approve raising 10,000 troops and placing that militia under Federal control. Washington D.C. was sacked before the Treaty of Ghent ended the war. Barbour also authorized exploration of the upper James River and received funding to improve Virginia roads. He was also the first Governor to inhabit the Virginia Governor's Mansion, designed by Alexander Parris. Virginians sent resolutions thanking the Governor for his strong and apt leadership during the war.

=== U.S. Senator ===
On December 1, 1814, Virginia's legislators elected Barbour (then 40) to succeed Richard Brent in the United States Senate. Although Barbour had previously opposed a national bank, President James Madison supported such, so Barbour became the Senate sponsor of a bill written by Secretary of the Treasury Alexander James Dallas, which authorized the National Bank with $50,000,000 in capital. It passed (although prior similar legislation failed).

Senator Barbour aligned with Senators John C. Calhoun and Henry Clay on internal improvements and slavery. Although his brother Philip P. Barbour served contemporaneously in the U.S. House, their stances and votes often differed. Senator Barbour proposed a committee on roads and canals, supported the Bonus Bill (authorizing spending the bonus from the national bank on internal improvements), and proposed a constitutional amendment to grant Congress the authority to appropriate money for internal improvements. Senator Barbour also opposed reducing the national army, supported a bill abolishing imprisonment for debts, and introduced the Navigation Act of 1818. That Act closed U.S. ports to any ships from British ports closed to U.S. ships. Barbour hoped this would encourage the British to open their ports. However, that effort failed. In 1823 a compromise led to the Elsewhere Act, which allowed for reciprocal trade.

Peers elected Barbour President pro tempore of the Senate in 1819. The 16th Congress, over which Barbour presided, adopted the Missouri Compromise on slavery. Barbour proposed combining the bill admitting Missouri (after he spoke in favor of allowing that state's voters to elect to support slavery) with the bill admitting Maine—both in an attempt to deny the Northern Senators an opportunity to gain four anti-slavery Senators. His speech may have foreshadowed the Southern position in the American Civil War after his death:

Sir, no portion of the Union has been more loyal than the South. Is this your reward for our loyalty? Sir, there is a point where resistance becomes a virtue and submission a crime. Our people are as brave as they are loyal. They can endure anything but insult. But the moment you pass that Rubicon, they will redeem their much abused character and throw back upon you your insolence and your aggression.

As Senator, Barbour sponsored a resolution giving an honorary sword to Colonel Richard Mentor Johnson of Kentucky for his efforts in the Battle of the Thames in 1813. Johnson and Barbour would become quick friends following Barbour's efforts. Later, Johnson promoted Barbour's appointment as Secretary of War under President John Quincy Adams. However, that association with Adams, whom the Senate narrowly elected over Andrew Jackson, would later devastate both Senator Clay's (and Barbour's) political careers.

Virginia legislators elected the Jacksonian Democrat John Randolph of Roanoke to succeed Senator Barbour in December 1825. Like Barbour, he would defend slavery, although a member of the American Colonization Society like Henry Clay. Unlike Barbour, he would later emancipate the people he enslaved upon his death. Randolph opposed the national bank and the Missouri Compromise of 1820 that Barbour had helped Clay pass.

=== Secretary of War ===
Following Adams' inauguration on March 4, 1825, fellow Senators confirmed Barbour as Secretary of War and Henry Clay as Secretary of State. The War Department's primary functions were managing the army and overseeing Indian affairs.

Barbour soon came into conflict with Governor George Troup of Georgia, who wanted to evict Creek Indians from 5 million acres (20,000 km^{2}) of land. Northern Creeks had supported Britain in the War of 1812, and Georgia planters had engaged in the Red Stick War to acquire Southern Creek lands. However, those Southern Creeks assimilated and supported the Americans during the war. Governor Troup's partially-Creek cousin William McIntosh had signed the Treaty of Indian Springs (1825), purporting to relinquish tribal lands in exchange for $200,000 for himself and installments totaling $200,000 for five other signatories. The U.S. Senate approved it by one vote on March 7, but tribal members protested vehemently, sentenced McIntosh to death, and killed him.

President Adams renegotiated the Treaty of Washington (1826) on slightly more favorable terms to the native peoples. Both treaties provided for removal west of the Mississippi (as President Jackson would later do the Cherokee Indians on the Trail of Tears). Governor Troup was upset that the second treaty allowed some Creek to remain in Georgia and began a survey to prepare to sell those remaining lands and threatened to call out the militia. At that point, the federal government ceased protecting the Indians. All Creeks' lands were seized, and all Creeks removed from Georgia by 1827.

=== Diplomat ===
By 1826, President Adams was deeply unpopular compared to his opponent in 1824 (and presumptive in 1828), Andrew Jackson, as was Secretary of State Clay. Although some advocated Barbour as a vice-presidential candidate in the upcoming 1828 elections, Barbour sought an appointment as Minister to Great Britain. Critics claimed Barbour sought a "harbor in the storm" from the upcoming election.

Nonetheless, European intellectuals accepted the new ambassador. During the 1820s, Barbour was a member of the Columbian Institute for the Promotion of Arts and Sciences, as were other prominent military and medical professionals. On July 1, 1828, Barbour received an honorary LL.D. from the University of Oxford.

=== Final years ===
After President Adams' electoral defeat in 1828, Barbour returned to Virginia, announcing his candidacy for the General Assembly. However, Barbour's association with Adams and nationalistic policies made him unfavorable to the Virginian Republicans. Although his opponent was illiterate, the election was extremely close. And although Barbour was declared the winner, the election was contested. Before the legal decision, Barbour retired on February 16, 1831, citing the hostility in the Assembly against him.

Barbour continued to remain active in national politics. In December 1831, he attended the first national convention of the National Republican Party in Baltimore and was elected its presiding officer. The convention nominated Henry Clay for president in 1832 and John Sergeant for vice president. Barbour also became chairman of the 1839 Whig Party convention in Harrisburg, Pennsylvania, which nominated Virginia-born William Henry Harrison for President (who won the election of 1840 to become the 9th President of the United States).

== Death and legacy ==
After retiring from the Assembly, Barbour appeared and gave speeches to support political friends. One observer declared: "Gov. Barbour presented an imposing appearance, with a striking face, long, shaggy eyebrows, and head covered with silvery flowing locks; with a majestic and sonorous voice, he filled one's conception of a Roman Senator in the last days of the Republic." However, Barbour's health declined, and he spent his final months at Barboursville. He died on June 7, 1842. Senator James Barbour was buried in the family cemetery on the estate, Barbour Cemetery.

The grave and ruin of his mansion, Barboursville, remain within the modern Barboursville Vineyards. The ruin is listed on the National Register of Historic Places, as well as included within the Madison-Barbour Rural Historic District. However, the tombstone is a modern replacement ordered in 1940.

In addition to Barboursville, Virginia, Barboursville, West Virginia is named in his honor, as are Barbour County, West Virginia and Barbour County, Alabama. However, Barbourville, Kentucky is probably named after his uncle James Barbour (burgess)(1734–1804). The Library of Virginia has his executive papers.

The Barbour family remained politically powerful in that area of Virginia for the rest of the century, despite no longer enslaving people after the American Civil War. His first cousin John S. Barbour (1790–1855) also served in the Virginia General Assembly and chaired the Democratic National Convention of 1852. J.S. Barbour's sons James Barbour and his elder brother John S. Barbour, Jr. served in the Virginia House of Delegates before the American Civil War, and James Barbour also served in the 1850 Virginia Constitutional Convention and the 1861 Secession Convention and in the Confederate States Army while his brother continued to run the Orange and Alexandria Railroad. After the war, John S. Barbour Jr. reorganized the state's Conservative Party as the Democratic Party and served in both the U.S. House and U.S. Senate.

Political offices
Preceded by Hugh Nelson	Speaker of the Virginia House of Delegates; 1809–1812	Succeeded by Andrew Stevenson
Preceded by Peyton Randolph; Acting	Governor of Virginia; 1812–1814	Succeeded by Wilson Cary Nicholas
Preceded by John Gaillard	President pro tempore of the United States Senate; 1819	Succeeded by John Gaillard
Preceded by John C. Calhoun	United States Secretary of War; 1825–1828	Succeeded by Peter Buell Porter
U.S. Senate
Preceded by Richard Brent	U.S. Senator (Class 1) from Virginia; 1815–1825; Served alongside: William B. Giles, Armistead Mason, John Eppes, James Pleasants, John Taylor, Littleton Tazewell	Succeeded by John Randolph
New office	Chair of the Senate Foreign Relations Committee; 1816–1818	Succeeded by Nathaniel Macon
Preceded by James Brown	Chair of the Senate Foreign Relations Committee; 1820–1821	Succeeded by Rufus King
Preceded by Rufus King	Chair of the Senate Foreign Relations Committee; 1822–1825	Succeeded by Nathaniel Macon
Diplomatic posts
Preceded by Albert Gallatin	United States Minister to the United Kingdom; 1828–1829	Succeeded by Louis McLane
