= Bloomsbury (Frederick, Maryland) =

Historic house in Maryland

- U.S. National Register of Historic Places
- Location within Maryland Location within the United States
- Location: 2602 Thurston Road, Frederick, Maryland
- Coordinates: 39°18′17″N 77°22′10″W
- Area: 131 acres (53 ha)
- Architectural style: Georgian, Federal
- NRHP reference No.: 00001053
- Added to NRHP: September 13, 2000

Bloomsbury, also known as the Roger Johnson House, is a sandstone house in southern Frederick County, Maryland. The house was occupied by Roger Johnson, brother of Maryland governor Thomas Johnson, who established Bloomsbury Forge nearby. The property includes the remains of log slave quarters and a rare example of an early log barn.

Bloomsbury was listed on the National Register of Historic Places in 2000.
