= James Barbour (burgess) =

American slave owner and Virginia legislator (1734–1804)

James Barbour Jr.

Member of the Virginia House of Burgesses
- In office November 3, 1761 – June 1, 1765 Serving with John Field
- Preceded by: Thomas Slaughter
- Succeeded by: Thomas Slaughter

Personal details
- Born: 1734 Culpeper County, Province of Virginia
- Died: 1804 (aged 69–70) Lancaster, Kentucky, US
- Citizenship: Kingdom of Great Britain; United States of America
- Spouse: Frances Throckmorton Barbour
- Relations: Thomas Barbour
- Children: Elizabeth Barbour, Gabriel Barbour, Philip Edwin Barbour, Lucy Reed Baylor
- Parent: James Barbour Sr.
- Occupation: Planter, militia officer, politician

James Barbour (1734–1804) was a prominent planter and member of the Virginia House of Burgesses representing Culpeper County (1761–1765).

== Early and family life ==
Born in 1734 to the former Sarah Todd and her husband James Barbour (1707–1775). His father had patented (claimed) land in Spotsylvania County, Virginia in 1731 and 1733, some of which would later be located in Orange County, Virginia and Culpeper County, Virginia after those counties were created. Another of his father's sons, Thomas Barbour represented Orange County, Virginia in the Virginia House of Burgesses in 1769 and was the father of James Barbour (18th Governor of Virginia and 11th United States Secretary of War) as well as of Philip P. Barbour (U.S. Congressman from Virginia and an Associate Justice of the United States Supreme Court).

== Career ==
This James Barbour Jr. served in the Virginia House of Burgesses, representing Culpeper County alongside John Field in the assembly of 1761–1765.

As an ensign in the Culpeper militia in 1756, under Col. Thomas Slaughter, James Barbour Jr. "marched on an expedition against the Indians above Winchester." In 1775 (the year of his father's death), James Barbour Jr. was county lieutenant of the Culpeper militia. He served as an officer (colonel) on the Virginia Continental Line for at least three years (all eight years by one account) of the American revolution, raising men and provisions.

In the 1787 Virginia tax census, Barbour owned 15 enslaved adults and 22 enslaved teenagers, as well as 16 horses and 53 cattle in Culpeper county. Beginning in 1782, Barbour began purchasing land across the Appalachian mountains in then-vast Lincoln County, which became part of the Commonwealth of Kentucky upon its creation in 1791. Based on his military service, Barbour received a land grant of more than 3500 acres in 1785 in what was then called Kentucky County. Barbour ultimately moved to Garrard County, Kentucky, where he moved before 1800.

== Personal life ==
He married Frances Throckmorton and had children, including Mordecai Barbour (1764–1844), who also served in the American Revolutionary War but ultimately moved to Alabama.

== Death and legacy ==
Barbour died in 1804 near Lancaster, the Garrard County seat.
