= Rebel Hall =

Historic house in Virginia, United States

- U.S. National Register of Historic Places
- Virginia Landmarks Register
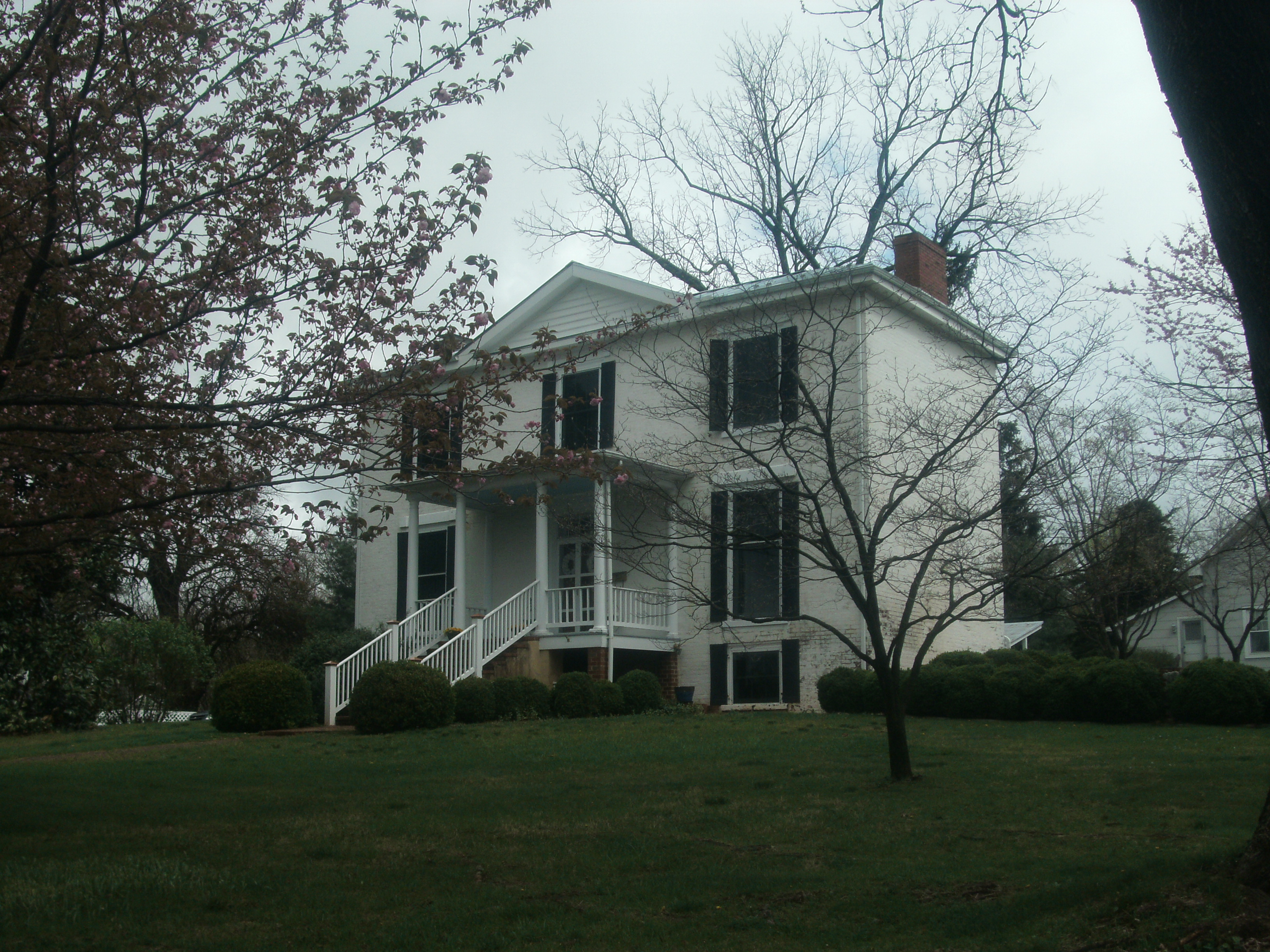
- Rebel Hall, April 2017

- Location within Virginia Location within the United States
- Location: 151 May-Fray Ave., Orange, Virginia
- Coordinates: 38°14′47″N 78°6′37″W
- Area: 0.8 acres (0.32 ha)
- Built: 1848-1849, c. 1900
- Architectural style: Greek Revival
- NRHP reference No.: 02000179
- VLR No.: 275-0010

Significant dates
- Added to NRHP: March 13, 2002
- Designated VLR: December 5, 2001

Rebel Hall is a historic plantation house located at Orange, Orange County, Virginia. It was built in 1848–1849, and is a two-story, three-bay, Greek Revival style brick dwelling. It sits on a raised brick basement and has a shallow-pitched, standing-seam metal roof. A rear wing was added about 1900.

It was listed on the National Register of Historic Places in 2002.
