= East Williston =

East Williston is the name of several places in the United States of America:

- East Williston, Florida
- East Williston, New York
