= Berry Hill (Orange, Virginia) =

Historic house in Virginia, United States

- U.S. National Register of Historic Places
- Virginia Landmarks Register
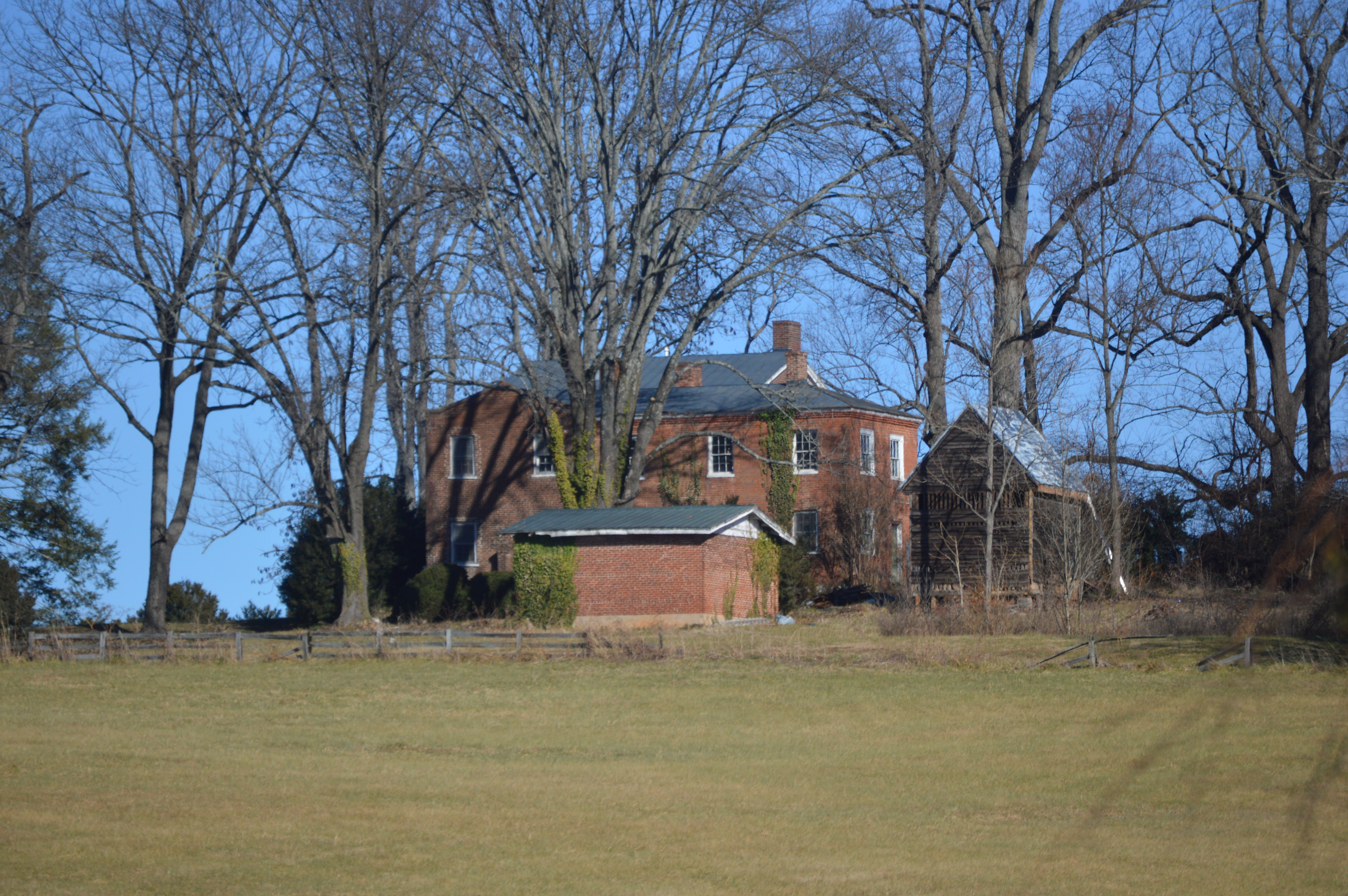
- Distant view from southwest

- Location within Virginia Location within the United States
- Location: S of Orange on VA 647, near Orange, Virginia
- Coordinates: 38°14′12″N 78°6′30″W
- Area: 48 acres (19 ha)
- Built: 1827
- Built by: William B. Philips
- Architectural style: Italianate, Jeffersonian
- NRHP reference No.: 80004208
- VLR No.: 068-0004

Significant dates
- Added to NRHP: May 7, 1980
- Designated VLR: February 19, 1980

Berry Hill is a historic home located near Orange, Orange County, Virginia. It was built in 1827, and is a 2 1/2-story, brick dwelling with a standing-seam metal gable roof. It consists of an arcaded pavilion in the main section with a west wing. It was built by William B. Philips a master mason employed by Thomas Jefferson during the construction of the University of Virginia.

It was listed on the National Register of Historic Places in 1980.
