= John Stephen Willison =

Sir John Stephen Willison
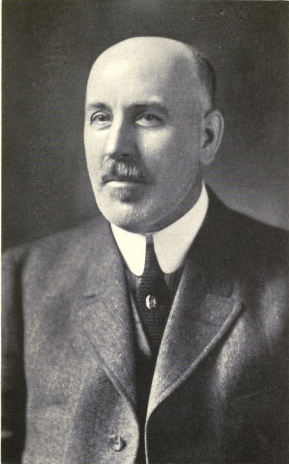
- Born: November 9, 1856; Near Hills Green, Huron County, Upper Canada
- Died: May 27, 1927 (aged 70); Toronto, Ontario, Canada
- Known for: Editor of The Globe

Sir John Stephen Willison, FRSC (November 9, 1856 – May 27, 1927) was a Canadian newspaperman, author, and businessman.

Born near Hills Green, Huron County, Canada West, the son of Stephen Willison, a blacksmith, and Jane Abram, Willison left school at the age of 15. After working as an assistant teacher and a clerk, he started working in journalism with the London Advertiser in 1881 and then with the Globe in 1883. In 1886, he reported from the Parliamentary Press Gallery in Ottawa, Ontario. While in Ottawa he became friends with future Prime Minister of Canada Wilfrid Laurier, whom he advised extensively on questions of provincial rights and language policy.

In 1890, Willison was appointed editor of the Globe. In 1900, he was elected president of the Canadian Press Association and became a Fellow of the Royal Society of Canada. In 1903, his book Sir Wilfrid Laurier and the Liberal party: a political history was published.

In 1902, he left the Globe and went to work at The Toronto Evening News. In 1908, he was appointed the Canadian correspondent of the British newspaper The Times. In 1919, his memoir Reminiscences, political and personal was published.

In 1913, he was made a Knight Bachelor.

He died in Toronto in 1927.
