= John Willison =

Church of Scotland minister (1680–1750)

Evangelical minister Church of Scotland

Personal details
- Born: 1680
- Died: May 3, 1750
- Occupation: Evangelical minister, Writer

John Willison (1680 – 3 May 1750) was an evangelical minister of the Church of Scotland and a writer of Christian literature.

== Life ==
His father was laird of a small property near Stirling, where John Willison was born. He was inducted to the parish of Brechin as minister in 1703. In 1718 he moved to a charge in Dundee.

His treatise on the sanctification of the Lord's day was in response to the policies of James VI and the Episcopal clergy. It provoked a reply from James Small, an Episcopalian, which was answered by Willison in his Letter from a Parochial Bishop to a Prelatical Gentleman. After this, he wrote a devotional work: A Sacramental Directory. Small replied to his earlier Letter, upon which Willison published An Apology for the Church of Scotland. He then moved on to political topics with A Letter to an English Member of Parliament.

After the ejection of Ebenezer Erskine and his fellow-ministers for opposition to patronage, Willison attacked their exclusion in a sermon to the Synod of Angus and Mearns in 1733 (published as "The Church's Danger"). He tried to win them back and a majority was gained in the General Assembly of 1734 as a healing measure. As a result, Willison was sent to London as part of a deputation to labour for the repeal of patronage, but they were only successful insofar as they gained some important concessions. Erskine and his colleagues were not satisfied and formed a separate presbytery in 1739 (see United Presbyterian Church of Scotland for Seceders history).

In 1737 he wrote one of his most famous and most reprinted works The Afflicted Man's Companion, and also an explanation of the Shorter Catechism called An Example of Plain Catechising. Other catechetical pieces published by Willison at different times were The Mother's Catechism (a famous and much used young children's catechism) and The Young Communicant's Catechism.

In 1742 he published another much printed work, The Balm of Gilead which includes twenty-four discourses, twelve of them relating to The Lord's Supper. In 1744 there followed his Fair and Impartial Testimony on the state of the Church of Scotland.

During the Jacobite rebellion of 1745, having published in the same year Popery Another Gospel, he was threatened by soldiers of the Highland army while conducting service in the church building and for a few weeks had to preach in private houses.

His last publication was Sacramental Meditations and Advices (1747).

== Selected writings ==
- Treatise Concerning the Sanctification of the Lord's-Day (1712 or 1713)
- A Letter from a Parochial Bishop to a Prelatical Gentleman in Scotland, concerning the Government of the Church(1714)
- A Sacramental Directory: or, a Treatise concerning the Sanctification of a Communion-Sabbath (1716)
- An apology for the Church of Scotland : against the accusations of prelatists and Jacobites, particularly the reflections of J.S. late incumbent at Forfar (1719)
- A letter to an English member of Parliament : from a gentleman in Scotland, concerning the slavish dependencies, which a great part of that nation is still kept under, by superiorities, wards, reliefs, and other remains of the feudal law, and by clanships and tithes (1721)
- The Church's danger, and the minister's duty declared, in a sermon preach'd at the opening of the Synod of Angus and Mearns (1733)
- The Afflicted Man's Companion (1737)
- An Example of plain Catechising upon the Assembly's Shorter Catechism (1737)
- The balm of Gilead, for healing a diseased land (1742)
- A fair and impartial testimony : essayed in name of a number of ministers, elders, and Christian people of the Church of Scotland, unto the laudable principles, wrestlings and attainments of that Church; and against the backslidings, corruptions, divisions, and prevailing evils, both of former and present times (1744)
- Sacramental meditations and advices for the use of communicants : in preparing their hearts, and exciting their affections, on sacramental occasions; and a Christian directory, consisting of forty scripture directions, proper for all those intending heaven (1747)

== Sources ==
- Biographical introduction to John Johnstone's reprint of "The Afflicted Man's Companion"
- COPAC
