= Williston (Orange, Virginia) =

Historic house in Virginia, United States

- U.S. National Register of Historic Places
- Virginia Landmarks Register
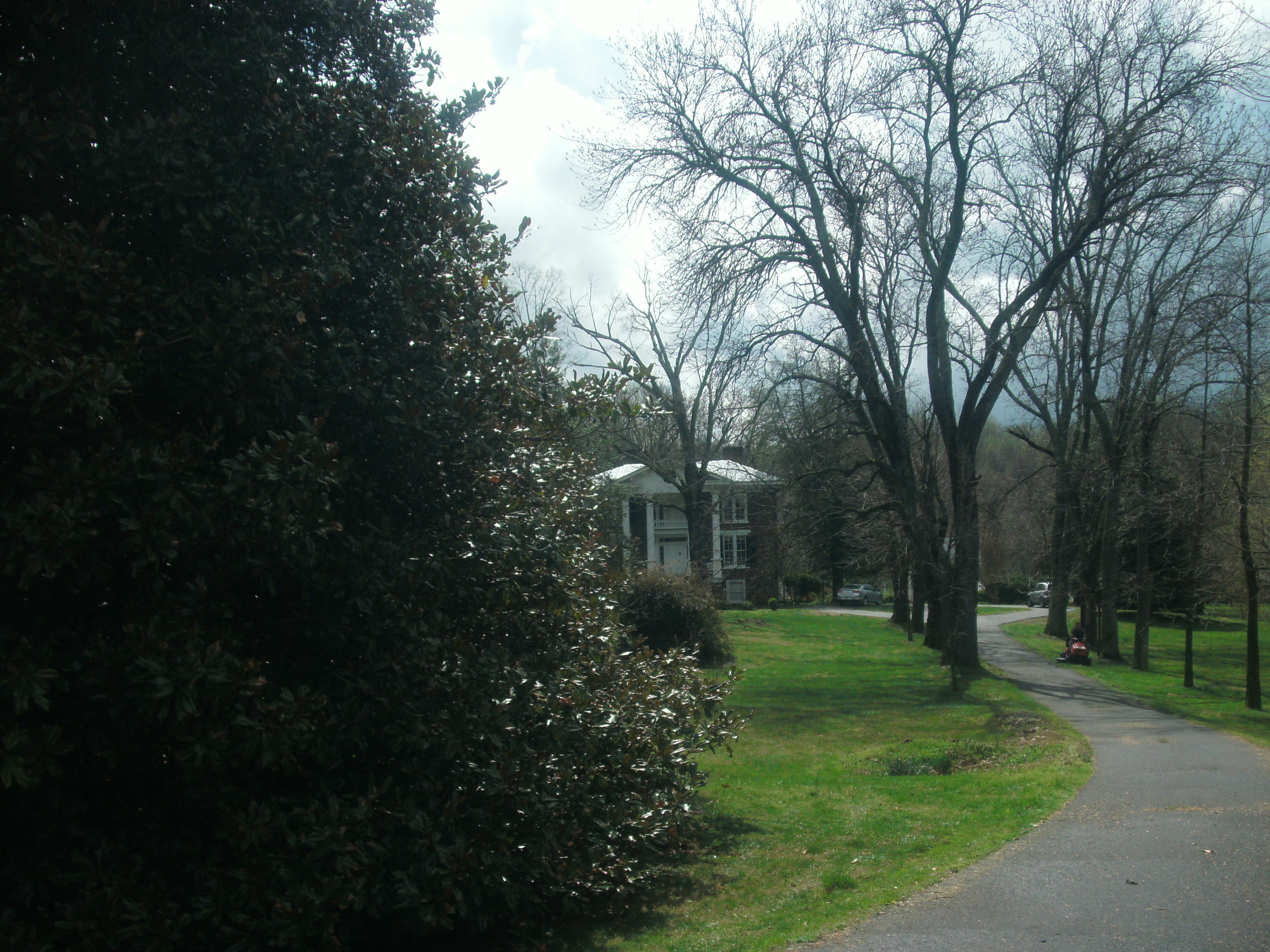
- View of Williston, April 2017

- Location within Virginia Location within the United States
- Location: 13430 Constitution Hwy., Orange, Virginia
- Coordinates: 38°14′23″N 78°08′07″W
- Area: 28.9 acres (11.7 ha)
- Built: 1867
- Architectural style: Italianate
- NRHP reference No.: 05001270
- VLR No.: 068-0065

Significant dates
- Added to NRHP: November 16, 2005
- Designated VLR: September 14, 2005

Williston is a historic home and farm complex located near Orange, Orange County, Virginia. It was built in 1867, and is a two-story, three-bay, Italianate style brick dwelling. The front facade features a tall portico with paired fluted polygonal columns set on pedestals. The interior features stenciled and painted murals on the dining room walls. Also on the property are the contributing smokehouse, hen house, servant's house, carriage house, granary and the foundation and lean-to of what was formerly a late-19th century barn.

It was listed on the National Register of Historic Places in 2005.
