= Orange County Courthouse (Virginia) =

- U.S. National Register of Historic Places
- U.S. Historic district – Contributing property
- Virginia Landmarks Register
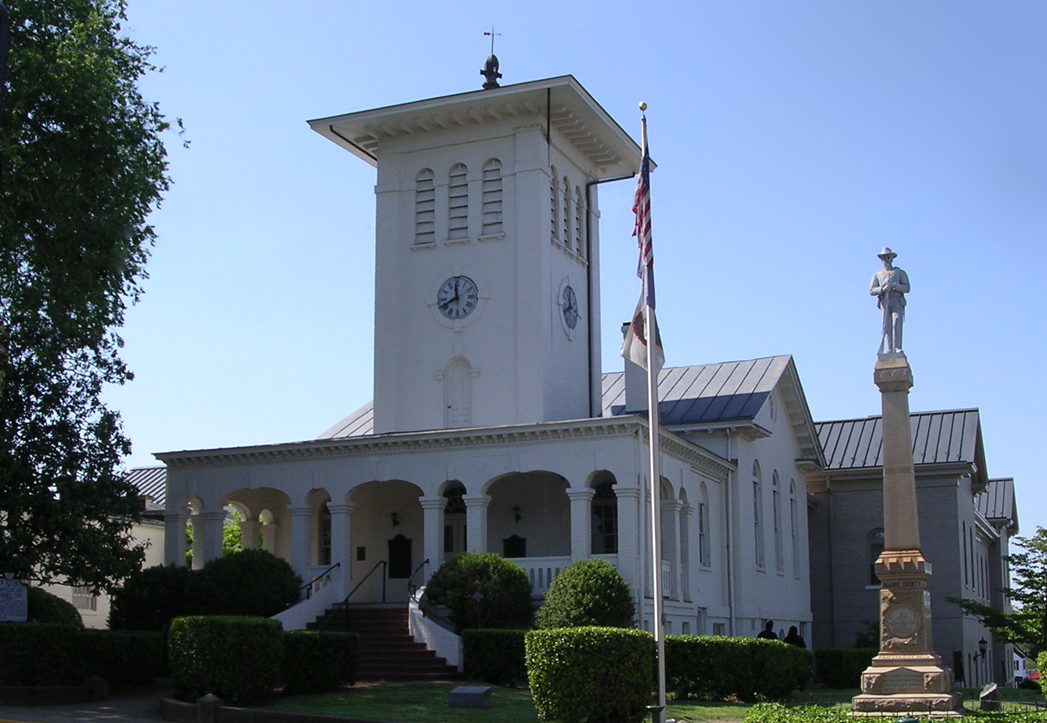
- Orange County Courthouse

- Location within Virginia Location within the United States
- Interactive map showing the location of Orange County Courthouse
- Location: Madison Rd. and N. Main St., Orange, Virginia
- Coordinates: 38°14′42″N 78°6′43″W
- Area: 0.1 acres (0.040 ha)
- Built: 1858-1859
- Architect: Haskins & Alexander
- Architectural style: Italian Villa
- NRHP reference No.: 79003062
- VLR No.: 275-0003

Significant dates
- Added to NRHP: December 28, 1979
- Designated VLR: September 18, 1979

Orange County Courthouse is a historic courthouse complex located at Orange, Orange County, Virginia. It was built in 1858–1859, and is a 1 1/2-story, Italian Villa style brick structure. The front facade features a three-part arcade consisting of a semi-elliptical arch flanked by small semicircular arches. Above the arcade is a three-stage tower consisting of the main entrance as the first stage; a clock, installed within existing round windows in 1949, as the second stage; and arched openings with louvres covered by a shallow hip roof and topped by a finial complete the tower. Associated with the courthouse are the contributing clerk's office (1894) and jail (1891).

It was listed on the National Register of Historic Places in 1979. It is located in the Orange Commercial Historic District.
