= Bloomsbury (Orange, Virginia) =

Historic house in Virginia, United States

- U.S. National Register of Historic Places
- Virginia Landmarks Register
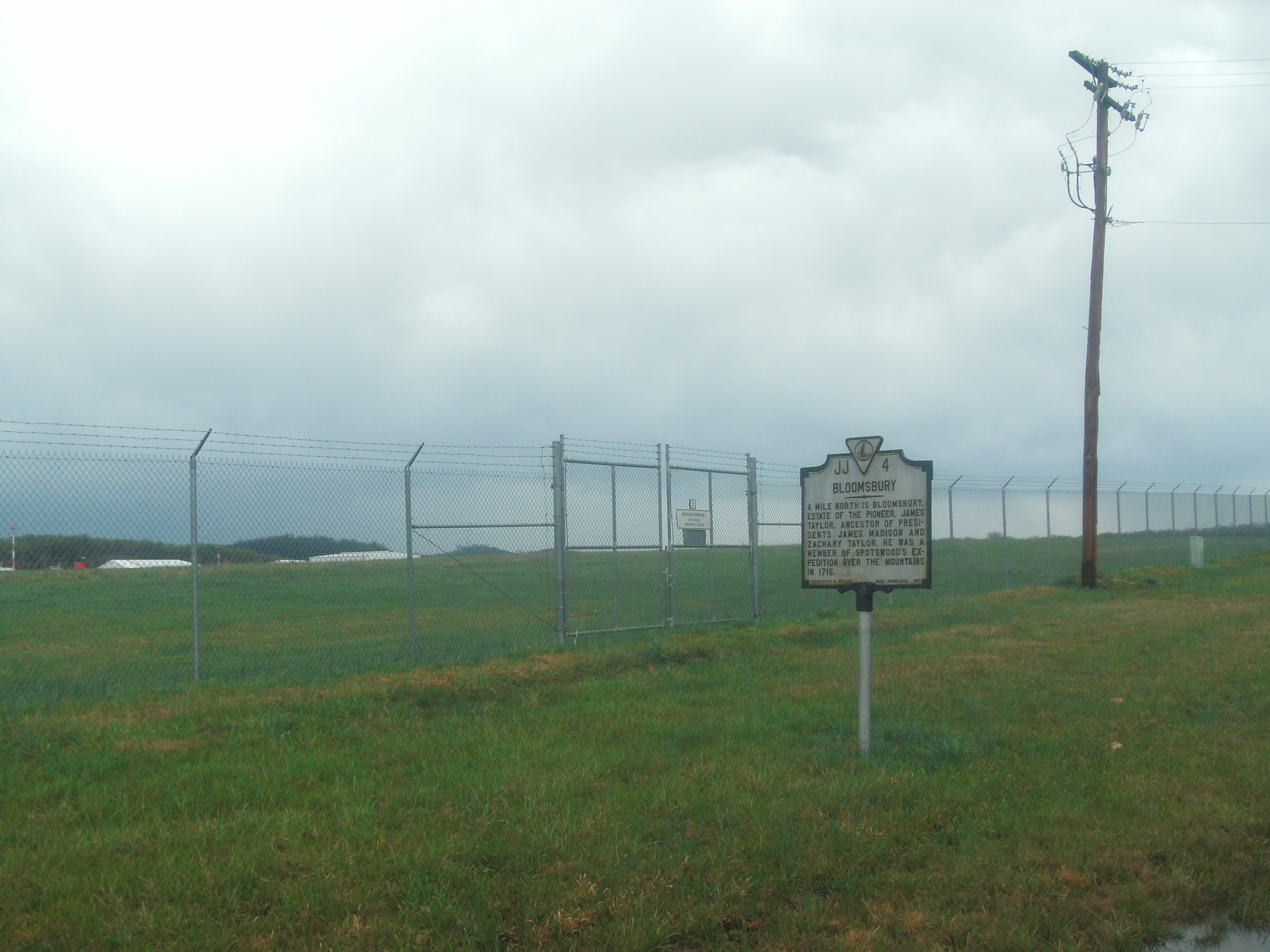
- Historic marker for Bloomsbury near Orange County Airport, April 2017

- Location within Virginia Location within the United States
- Location: Off VA 20 W of jct. with VA 600, near Orange, Virginia
- Coordinates: 38°15′23″N 78°3′33″W
- Area: 377 acres (153 ha)
- Built: c. 1720, c. 1797
- Architectural style: Colonial, Georgian, Southern Colonial
- NRHP reference No.: 92000044
- VLR No.: 068-0005

Significant dates
- Added to NRHP: February 27, 1992
- Designated VLR: June 19, 1990

Bloomsbury is a historic home located near Orange, Orange County, Virginia. The original section dates to the early- to mid-18th century, and is a 1 1/2-story, frame Colonial dwelling with a steep gable roof and "U"-plan stairway of a form unknown elsewhere in Virginia. It retains nearly all its original late-Georgian interior detailing. It was doubled in size about 1797, with a two-story Federal-period addition that stands at right angles to the original block and is flanked by early shed-roofed end wings. The house was restored in the 1960s. Also on the property are a contributing 19th-century smokehouse, a contributing 18th-century cemetery, and a contributing garden site.

It was listed on the National Register of Historic Places in 1992.
