= Barboursville (James Barbour) =

Historic ruins in Virginia, US

- Barboursville mansion
- U.S. National Register of Historic Places
- U.S. Historic district – Contributing property
- Virginia Landmarks Register
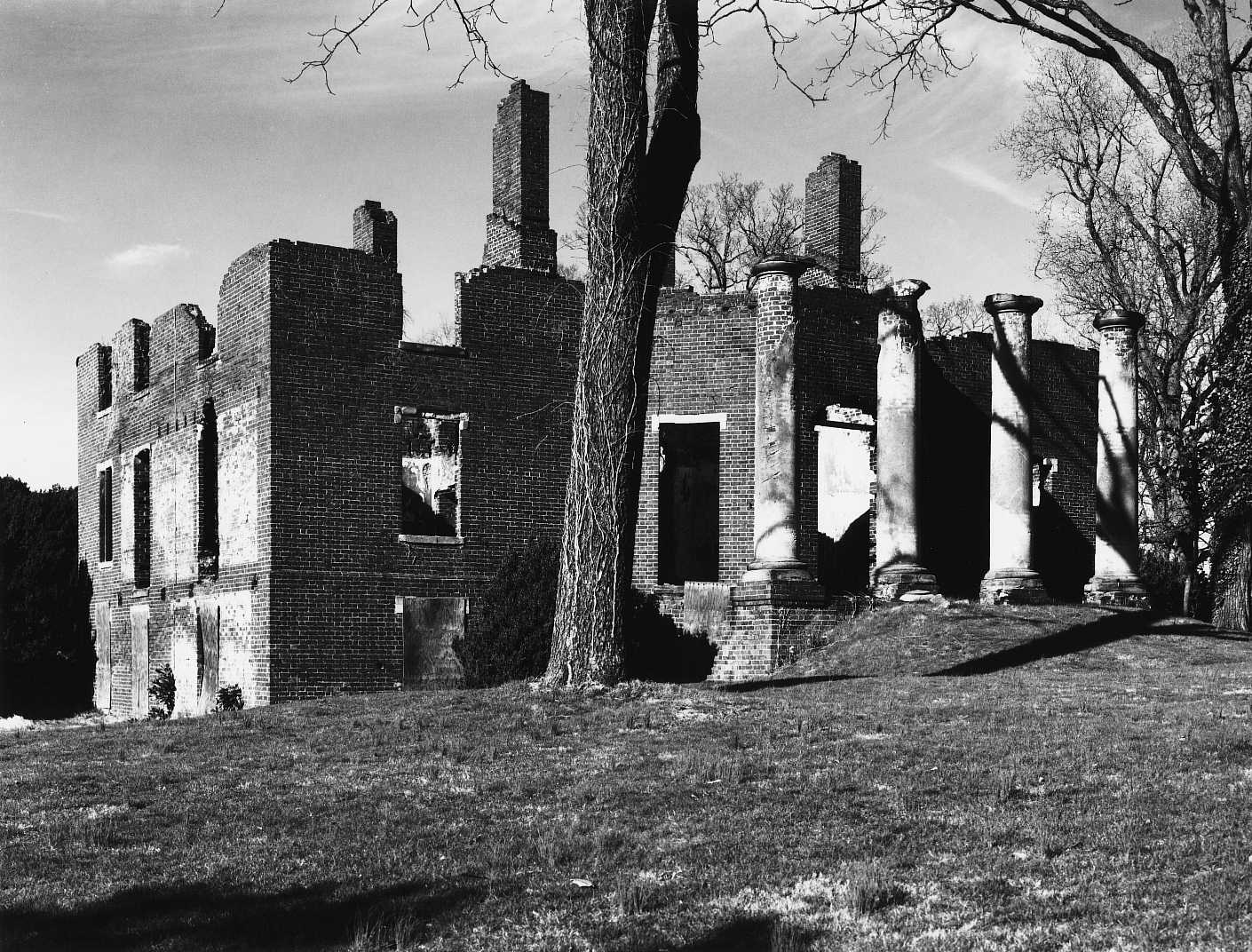
- Barboursville ruin

- Location within Virginia Location within the United States
- Location: S of jct. of Rtes. 777 and 678, Barboursville, Virginia
- Coordinates: 38°09′44.55″N 78°16′50.48″W
- Area: 0 acres (0 ha)
- Built: 1822
- Architect: Thomas Jefferson
- Architectural style: Neo-Palladian
- Demolished: (Burned) 1884
- NRHP reference No.: 69000267
- VLR No.: 068-0002

Significant dates
- Added to NRHP: November 12, 1969
- Designated VLR: September 9, 1969

Barboursville is the ruin of the mansion of James Barbour, located in Barboursville, Virginia. He was the former U.S. Senator, U.S. Secretary of War, and Virginia Governor. It is now within the property of Barboursville Vineyards. The house was designed by Thomas Jefferson, president of the United States and Barbour's friend and political ally. The ruin is listed on the National Register of Historic Places.

== Original Jeffersonian design ==
Until it burned on Christmas Day 1884, Barbour's house stood essentially as completed, c. 1822, from designs by Thomas Jefferson. Jefferson designed the house in the then fashionable Neo-Palladian style.

Only two one-story side porches appear to have been later additions. Though large in scale, the house contained only eight principal rooms, as the hall, drawing room, and dining room were two-story chambers. The entrance façade featured a projecting Roman Doric tetrastyle portico which covered the recessed front wall of the entrance hall. On the garden front, the walls of the octagonal drawing room projected into a similar portico, as at Monticello.

The octagonal dome which Jefferson proposed in his drawing was omitted during construction; it is uncertain whether the Chinese latticework railing which appeared in Jefferson's drawing around the base of the roof was ever installed. Although the dining room had no chamber over it, Jefferson indicated a faux window on the second floor level in order to keep the garden front symmetrical. This feature was omitted and consequently gave that side of the house an unbalanced appearance. There is little evidence as to the appearance of the original interior architectural trim.

== Destruction in fire ==
During the fire of 1884, everything except the exterior brick walls, the interior masonry partitions, and the columns of the porticoes were destroyed. The ruins have been stabilized and are maintained as a tourist attraction.

== Related buildings ==
To the north of the house are two service buildings which now serve as an inn for guests of Barboursville Vineyards. It is believed that these structures were built c. 1790 and were lived in by James Barbour until the main house was completed. As they are built on the slope of a hill, they appear as one story on the front with two-story columned galleries on the rear.

== Gardens ==
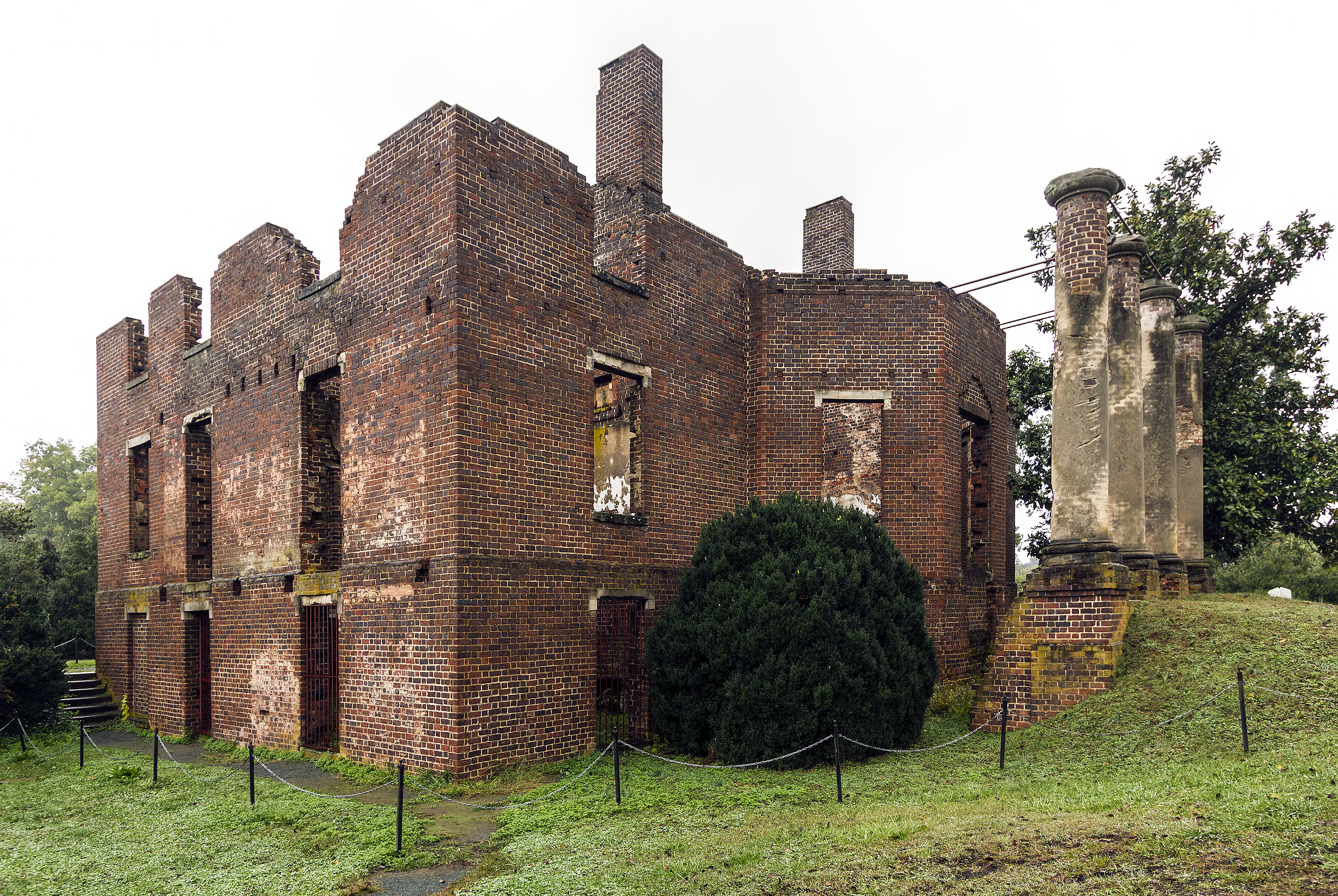
Ruins of Barboursville mansion as of 2013, Barboursville, Virginia, US

Barbour's estate has been known for its unusually large and fine boxwood, which flourish on the grounds immediately surrounding the main house. A portion of the gardens were once surrounded by a serpentine wall similar to those designed by Thomas Jefferson for the gardens at the University of Virginia.

== Listing on National Register of Historic Places ==
Barboursville was listed on the National Register of Historic Places on November 12, 1969. Thomas Jefferson's role as architect and the fineness of the design, still visible as a ruin, were the prime factors in the property's listing. It is included in the Madison-Barbour Rural Historic District.

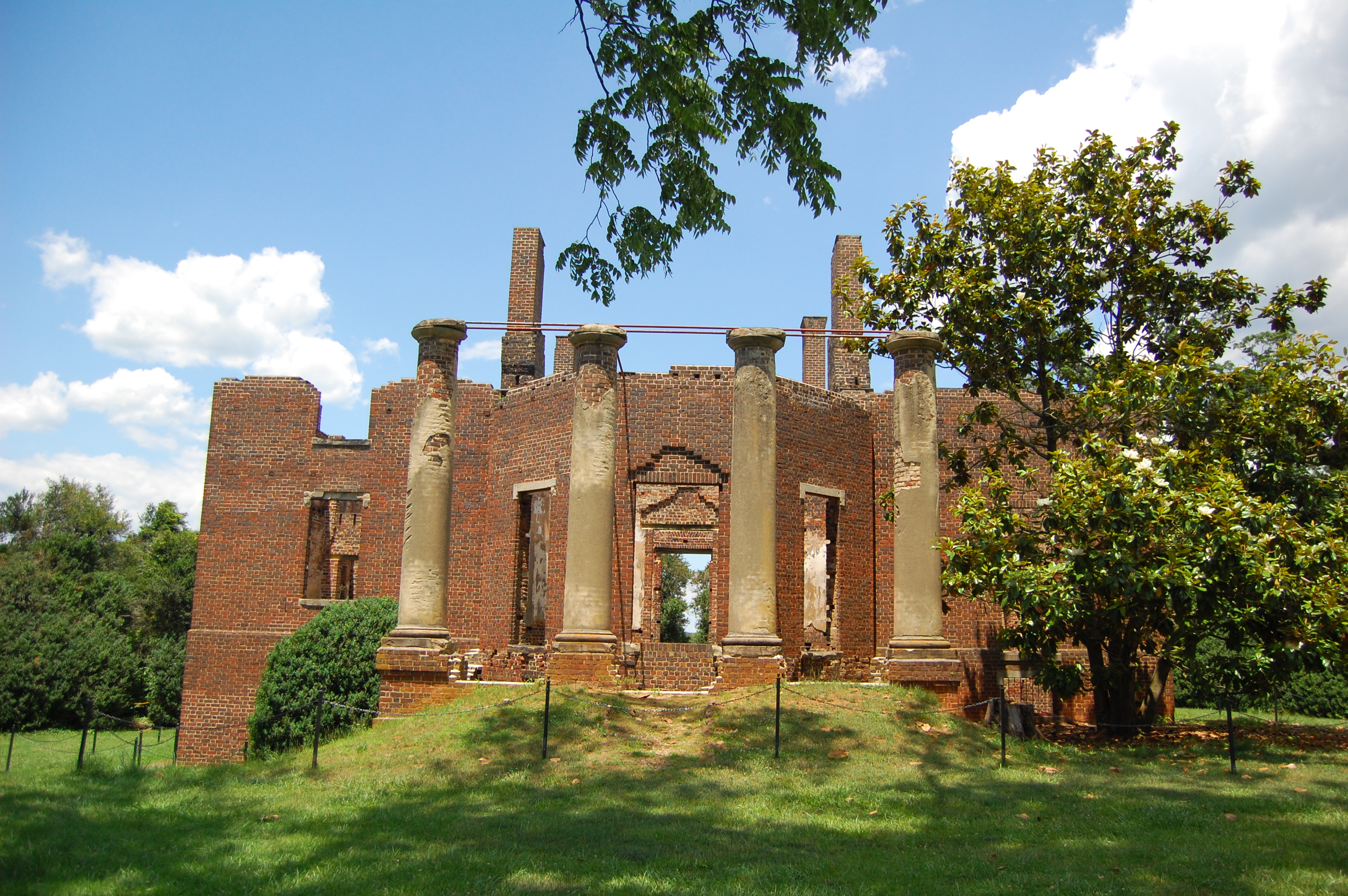
Barboursville mansion ruins, Barboursville, Virginia (2008, photo by Amy C Evans)

== Current use ==
The ruin is within the property owned by Barboursville Vineyards and can be viewed by visitors to the winery. On summer evenings, theatrical and musical productions are presented at the ruin.

== See also ==
- Jeffersonian architecture
