= Barboursville, Virginia =

Unincorporated community in Virginia, United States

- Census-designated place
- Location within Virginia Location within the United States
- Coordinates: 38°10′15″N 78°16′54″W
- Country: United States
- State: Virginia
- County: Orange

Area
  - Total: 2.25 sq mi (5.82 km^{2})
  - Land: 2.24 sq mi (5.80 km^{2})
  - Water: 0.0077 sq mi (0.02 km^{2})

Population (2020)
  - Total: 177
  - Density: 79.0/sq mi (30.5/km^{2})
- Time zone: UTC−5 (Eastern (EST))
  - Summer (DST): UTC−4 (EDT)
- GNIS feature ID: 1492511

Barboursville is an unincorporated community and census-designated place (CDP) in Orange County, Virginia, United States. It is the birthplace of renowned American military commander and president Zachary Taylor. It also contains Barboursville, the home of James Barbour, the 19th governor of the Commonwealth of Virginia, after whom the community is named. The ruins of his home are now on land owned by one of the Piedmont region's wineries, Barboursville Vineyards. It was first listed as a CDP in the 2020 census with a population of 177.

The community is located at the intersection of VA 20 and US 33. Rural areas outside the community which use the Barboursville ZIP code include portions of Albemarle and Greene counties.

In addition to Barboursville, the Madison-Barbour Rural Historic District, Hampstead Farm Archeological District, and Burlington are listed on the National Register of Historic Places.

== Mining in Barboursville ==
Residents of the Barboursville community (including an historic free town made up of descendants of former enslaved people of surrounding plantations) were threatened in 2001 by a mining operation proposed by General Shale Product Corporation. Also threatened were local businesses, including two wineries. The brick-making company wanted to mine 89 acres of a 139-acre plot in Barboursville. This move was crucial to the company's business due to the fact their site in Somerset would run out of shale at the end of the year. A group called Friends of Barboursville banded together to speak against the mining at two Planning Commission public hearings. The Friends of Barboursville, and others in the community, fought for over 3 years with the brick-making company, and with the county about how shale mining would be detrimental to the community's progress. A judge dismissed the case in 2003. The case was then taken to the Virginia Supreme Court who, in January 2005, decided in favor of the plaintiffs, the result being that no mining at the site in question was permitted to go forward.

== Barboursville ruins ==
On Christmas Day 1884, 62 years after it was built, the Barboursville mansion was consumed by fire. This building was known as the only building in Orange County to be designed by Thomas Jefferson. James Barbour was close friends with Jefferson and owned the building. Jefferson designed the building for Barbour with the former's own home in mind. The house originally had a race track in front of it, but now it is home to one of Virginia's first significant wineries. The ruins are now a tourist destination and a backdrop for Four County Players productions of "Shakespeare at the Ruins" in August.

== Barboursville Vineyards ==
The Barbour family used the landscape where Barboursville Vineyards is located for pastoral farmland from the mid-18th century and through the mid-20th century. The land was preserved by James Barbour most efficiently by rotating crops and having sheep graze the fields. The winery sees their practice as a way to preserve traditional values even through the new Age of Agriculture in Virginia.

Government officials, bankers, and landowners made a push to plant tobacco at the location of the Barboursville Vineyards. Despite their advice, Gianni Zonin, who had been an heir to his family's wine business in the Veneto, became the owner to the Barbour Plantation in 1976. He dreamed of creating a vineyard on this land despite the fact that Thomas Jefferson attempted the same goal at Monticello and failed for many years.

The winery celebrated its 30th anniversary in 2006. In 2007 the vineyard was labeled as one of the best new wine destinations. The region has over 200 wineries and much of their success can be attributed to Zonin for starting the business.

== Demographics ==
Barboursville first appeared as a census designated place in the 2020 U.S. census.

== Four County Players ==
Founded in 1973, Four County Players is Central Virginia's longest continuously operating community theater.

The group grew out of an idea shared by Lillian Morse and Bill Thomas: “Creative arts need to be a part of the area’s rural communities.” The theater group officially started in January 1973 when a group of ten people gathered at Morse's home. They pooled their money for start-up costs, and when the take was tallied, the founders had $70 to launch their new enterprise. The first thing they did was set up theater workshops for children at the Gordonsville Recreational Center. This effort produced many new members.

The TREE Program

In 1979, the Players wanted to take on projects that would have a positive and enriching effect in the community, and began the Theater Related Employment Experience Program, also known as the TREE Program. Funded by the Governor's Manpower Services Council, TREE enabled Four County Players to hire disadvantaged youths and teach them marketable jobs skills directly related to theater.

Launching the Scholarship Program

In 1980, Ralph and Marcelia Hall, two long-time patrons, wanted to recognize the contributions of the young thespians and technicians who came to share their numerous talents with the community. They started the Four County Players Scholarship program. Proceeds earned by selling refreshments in the Bistro are used to fund the program.

Shakespeare at the Ruins

In 1990, Sara Smith Bossong proposed the idea of staging Shakespeare plays outdoors. A partnership with Barboursville Vineyard was formed to use the ruins of a mansion on their property as a backdrop for plays. The red brick ruins are what remains of the home Thomas Jefferson designed for James Barbour, the Governor of Virginia from 1812 to 1814. The structure was destroyed by fire on Christmas Day, 1884. Located in the heart of the breathtaking Barboursville Vineyards, the stark ruins, the vineyards, and the high boxwood shrubs surrounding the house served as the backdrop for sixteen years of summer Shakespeare. Sadly, due to much-needed renovation and restoration to the continuously deteriorating ruins, the tradition ended in 2006. The final production in the ruins was, fittingly, All’s Well That Ends Well.

Season Productions

Every year, Four County Players presents four to five Mainstage shows. These productions include at least one musical, a straight play, and a family Christmas show.

== Notable people ==
- Zachary Taylor was born near Barboursville, Virginia, in 1784. He was a distinguished officer in multiple battles and was eventually elected as president of the United States in 1848. Taylor died in the White House two years later.
- James Barbour was born in Orange County, Virginia, in 1775. He studied law and was elected to the House of Delegates in 1798 and served until 1804. He was elected to the House of Delegates again from 1807 until 1812. Barbour also became Speaker of the House from 1809 until January 1812. He succeeded George William Smith for governor of Virginia in 1812.
- James Madison was born in Port Conway, Virginia. He worked with Thomas Jefferson to create Democratic-Republican Party and became president in 1808. Madison's estate Montpelier was located near Barboursville in Orange County, Virginia, where he died in 1836.
