= Madison–Barbour Rural Historic District =

Historic district in Virginia, United States

- U.S. National Register of Historic Places
- U.S. Historic district
- Virginia Landmarks Register
- Location within Virginia Location within the United States
- Location: Roughly bounded by US 15, the Rapidan R. and the Albemarle and Greene County lines, Barboursville, Virginia
- Coordinates: 38°11′56″N 78°13′37″W
- Area: 31,200 acres (126 km^{2})
- Architect: Jefferson, Thomas; Et al.
- Architectural style: Colonial Revival, Georgian, Federal
- NRHP reference No.: 90002115
- VLR No.: 068-0304

Significant dates
- Added to NRHP: January 17, 1991
- Designated VLR: July 21, 1987

Madison–Barbour Rural Historic District is a national historic district located near Barboursville, Orange County, Virginia. It encompasses 775 contributing buildings, 233 contributing sites, 111 contributing structures, and 1 contributing object. The district is best known for its large estates with imposing Federal and Georgian-style mansions, but also contains exemplary groupings of agricultural buildings, vernacular dwellings, and locally significant religious, commercial, and transportation-related structures. Located in the district are the separately listed Barboursville and Montpelier.

It was listed on the National Register of Historic Places in the year 1991.
