= Veterans Memorial Dam =

- Location within Virginia
- Official name: Veterans Memorial (Main) Dam (LOWA Dam No. 1)
- Country: United States
- Location: Lake of the Woods, Orange County, Virginia
- Coordinates: 38°20′59″N 77°45′17″W
- Status: Operational
- Opening date: 1968
- Owners: Lake of the Woods Association, Inc.

Dam and spillways
- Type of dam: Embankment, earth-fill
- Impounds: Flat Run
- Height: 60 ft (18 m)
- Length: 1,450 ft (442 m)
- Elevation at crest: 325.5 ft (99 m)
- Spillway capacity: 4,000 cu ft/s (113 m^{3}/s)

Reservoir
- Creates: Lake of the Woods
- Total capacity: 13,800 acre⋅ft (17,022,049 m^{3})
- Catchment area: 7.12 mi^{2} (18 km^{2})
- Surface area: 639 acres (259 ha)

The Veterans Memorial Dam (National ID # VA137001), also known as the Lake of the Woods Main Dam, is an earth-fill embankment dam on the Flat Run located 15.3 mi (25 km) west of Fredericksburg, Virginia.

The dam was constructed in 1968 with the primary purpose of recreation. Surrounding its reservoir is the resort community of Lake of the Woods. The Lake of the Woods Association owns the dam.
