= Black Meadow =

Historic house in Virginia, United States

- Black Meadow (Wolf Trap Farm, Gordonsville, VA)
- U.S. National Register of Historic Places
- Virginia Landmarks Register
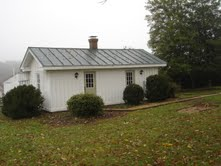
- Slave quarters at Black Meadow

- Location within Virginia Location within the United States
- Location: 17379 Wolf Trap Dr., near Gordonsville, Virginia
- Coordinates: 38°10′01″N 78°08′33″W
- Area: 584.1 acres (236.4 ha)
- Built: 1856
- Architectural style: Greek Revival, Colonial Revival
- NRHP reference No.: 05001262
- VLR No.: 068-0156

Significant dates
- Added to NRHP: November 16, 2005
- Designated VLR: September 14, 2005

Black Meadow (now known as "Wolftrap Farm") is a historic plantation house and farm complex located near Gordonsville, Orange County, Virginia. The house was built in 1856, and is a 1 1/2-story, three-bay, Greek Revival style dwelling with a front gable roof. It was renovated in 1916, with the addition of a two-story wood-frame ell and realignment of interior spaces. Also on the property are the contributing milk house (c. 1916), slave quarters (c. 1856), a dairy barn (c. 1943), a bent barn/stable (c. 1856), a multiuse barn/shed (c. 1856), and a tenant house (c. 1943).

Black Meadow was one of the outlying farms owned and cultivated by James and Dolley Madison, whose Montpelier home lies just a few miles northwest.

It was listed on the National Register of Historic Places in 2005.

The farm, known since the mid-1970s as Wolftrap Farm, is now operated as a wedding and events venue and seven homes on the farm are available as vacation rentals.
