= Gordonsville, Virginia =

- Town
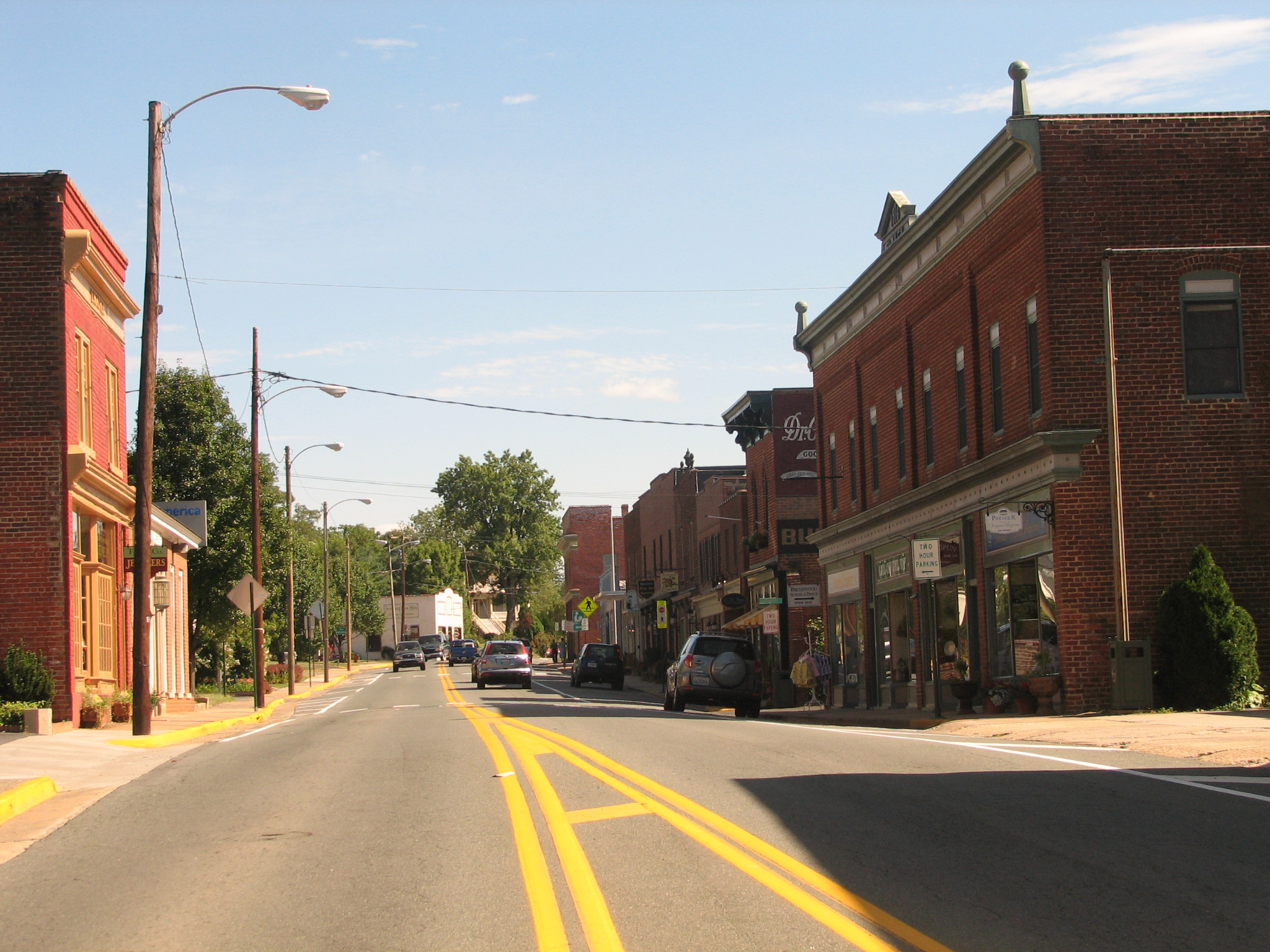
- Looking down S. Main St
- Nickname: "Fried Chicken Capital of the World"
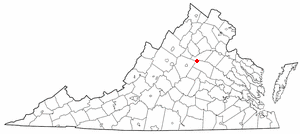
- Location of Gordonsville, Virginia
- Coordinates: 38°8′5″N 78°11′13″W
- Country: United States
- State: Virginia
- Counties: Orange
- Established: Jan 2005 1813 (Incorporated in 1870)

Government
  - Mayor: Ronald Brooks III

Area
  - Total: 0.95 sq mi (2.46 km^{2})
  - Land: 0.95 sq mi (2.46 km^{2})
  - Water: 0 sq mi (0.00 km^{2})
- Elevation: 499 ft (152 m)

Population (2020)
  - Total: 1,402
  - Density: 1,480/sq mi (571/km^{2})
- Time zone: UTC-5 (Eastern (EST))
  - Summer (DST): UTC-4 (EDT)
- ZIP code: 22942
- Area code: 540
- FIPS code: 51-31936
- GNIS feature ID: 1467264
- Website: Official website

Gordonsville is a town in Orange County in the Commonwealth of Virginia, United States. Located approximately 19 miles northeast of Charlottesville and 65 miles northwest of Richmond, the population was 1,402 at the 2020 census.

The town celebrated its bicentennial in 2013, two hundred years after local innkeeper Nathaniel Gordon was appointed the area's first postmaster, thus officially creating the area known as Gordonsville. It was strategically important during the Civil War, due to its location on the Virginia Central Railroad.

Gordonsville claims to have influenced the popularity of fried chicken in the United States; it bills itself as the "Fried Chicken Capital of the World."

== History ==
=== Pre-Civil War ===
In 1787, Nathaniel Gordon purchased 1,350 acres (5.46 square km) of land, then known as "Newville," from a cousin of President James Madison.

In 1794, or perhaps earlier, Gordon applied for and was granted a license to operate a tavern there, which, as was typical of the time, was used as a place to eat, lodge and discuss local matters. It sat at the intersection of two highways: "The Fredericksburgh Great Road," a stage route from Charlottesville, through Orange, to Fredericksburg; and "The Richmond Road," which led from the Virginia capital, through Louisa, west over the Blue Ridge Mountains into the Shenandoah Valley. President Thomas Jefferson described the tavern in 1802 as a "good house" when recommending the best route south to Charlottesville from the recently established national capital on the Potomac. The building was known as Gordon's Tavern, Gordon Tavern and later as Gordon Inn. The commemorative marker at the site lists prominent Americans as guests at the tavern: George Washington, Thomas Jefferson, James Monroe, James & Philip P. Barbour, James Waddel, William Wirt and Henry Clay. Another famous visitor was Major General the Marquis de Lafayette.

Gordon was named the first postmaster of the area in 1813, and the area became known as Gordonsville. At the time of Gordon's death in 1820, Gordonsville had, in addition to the tavern, a post office, several homes, a general mercantile store and a blacksmith shop. Nathaniel willed his land and tavern to his son, John, and near that same time Dr. Charles Beale (husband of Nathaniel's daughter, Mary) purchased adjoining land near what is currently Main Street. The later division and sale of lots from this property, and the construction of adjacent roads, would foster growth of the town up to and during the Civil War.

In 1839, the General Assembly authorized the extension of the Louisa Railroad (later the Virginia Central Railroad) from Louisa Courthouse to Gordonsville, which ushered in growth and prosperity for Gordonsville. It became a center of trade for the plantations and farms in the surrounding countryside. Two new roadways, the Blue Ridge Turnpike and the Rockingham Turnpike, were built to connect the town to New Market and Harrisonburg, respectively.

In 1854, the Orange & Alexandria Railroad completed its line into Gordonsville, connecting the area with northern portion of Virginia. Over the next few years, both railroad lines were extended, increasing Gordonsville's role as a transportation hub. The rail depots were constructed next to what is now S. Main Street.

Nathaniel Gordon's original tavern burned down in 1859. Richard F. Omohundro, who owned the land at the time, rebuilt what is now known as the Exchange Hotel. Following its completion in 1860, the hotel offered elegant lodging for rail passengers and other travelers. During the Civil War, it was used as a receiving hospital that saw more than 70,000 patients. It is now known as the Civil War Exchange Museum and is arguably the most historically and architecturally significant building in Gordonsville.

=== During the Civil War and after ===
Gordonsville and the railroads which intersected there were of vital importance to the Confederacy for troop mobility and supplies. Troops from Richmond on the way to the First Battle of Bull Run on July 21, 1861, came through town. During the war years, Robert E. Lee, James Longstreet, Stonewall Jackson, Richard S. Ewell and A. P. Hill spent time in Gordonsville. Major Gen. Philip Sheridan led a raid in the direction of Gordonsville and Charlottesville but was stopped by Wade Hampton's Confederate cavalry in the vicinity of Trevilian Station. Gordonsville was threatened many times but was always successfully defended by the Confederates. The Civil War ended in 1865 and with Gordonsville being largely unscathed, passenger rail service was quickly reestablished.

Gordonsville was officially incorporated into a town in 1870 by an act of the Virginia General Assembly. The population then was approximately 1,500. In the following years it was "a flourishing and fast improving town" and its prosperity gave rise to then-superior educational facilities and fine examples of period architecture, many of which are still standing on N. Main and W. Baker Streets. Gordonsville had the unique reputation as a fast-food emporium in the 1870s, with an active market of food vendors serving rail travelers as they stopped in the town. As alternative rail lines and roads were constructed bypassing Gordonsville, it morphed into a quiet, rural market town. Fires in 1916 and 1920 destroyed much of the downtown, with only a handful of buildings surviving to this day. Damage was repaired and buildings were rebuilt, largely shaping modern-day Gordonsville. The town has remained economically stable through current times, as has its population.

In the early 1970s, following the 100-year anniversary of the town's incorporation, a nonprofit organization named Historic Gordonsville Inc. was formed. As of August 2013, the company owned a large number of properties downtown, including the Exchange Hotel. Their renovation and preservation efforts have helped maintain the historic commercial core of Gordonsville. House Bill 847 was passed by the Virginia Assembly in 1996, which amended §10.1-2212 of the Virginia Code to add Historic Gordonsville, Inc. to the listing of historical societies eligible to receive appropriations from the Virginia Department of Historical Resources.

=== Places of historical significance ===
The Gordonsville Historic District, Black Meadow, Exchange Hotel, and Rocklands are listed on the National Register of Historic Places. The historic district and the Exchange Hotel are both within the town limits of Gordonsville; Black Meadow and Rocklands are nearby.

== Geography ==
Gordonsville is located at 38°8′5″N 78°11′13″W (38.134628, -78.187068).

According to the United States Census Bureau, the town has a total area of 0.9 square mile (2.4 km^{2}), all land.

== Demographics ==
Historical population
Census	Pop.	Note	%±
1880	919		—
1890	962		4.7%
1900	603		−37.3%
1910	564		−6.5%
1920	594		5.3%
1930	462		−22.2%
1940	508		10.0%
1950	1,118		120.1%
1960	1,109		−0.8%
1970	1,244		12.2%
1980	1,421		14.2%
1990	1,351		−4.9%
2000	1,498		10.9%
2010	1,496		−0.1%
2020	1,402		−6.3%
U.S. Decennial Census

As of the 2010 U.S. Census, there were 1,496 people, 632 households, and 388 families residing in the town. The population density was 1,646.1 people per square mile (635.6/km^{2}). There were 710 housing units, with an average density of 788.9 units per square mile (295.8/km^{2}). The racial makeup of the town was 70.7% White, 23.7% African American, 0.5% Asian, 2.5% from other races and 2.5% from two or more races. Hispanic or Latino of any race were 4.3% of the population.

Out of the 632 households, 26.3% had children under the age of 18 living with them, 38.0% were married couples living together, 18.7% had a female householder with no husband present, 4.7% had a male householder with no wife present and 38.6% were non-family households. Householders living alone accounted for 34.8% of the total households and 30.5% had a resident who was 65 years of age or older. The average household size was 2.37 and the average family size was 3.05.

The age distribution of Gordonsville's population was 24.4% under the age of 18, 8.1% from 18 to 24, 22.9% from 25 to 44, 28.9% from 45 to 64, and 15.6% who were 65 years of age or older. The median age was 40.8 years. For every 100 females, there were 84 males. For every 100 females age 18 and over, there were 80 males.

The median income for a household in the town was $41,845, and the median income for a family was $52,000. Males working full-time had a median income of $38,421 versus $33,250 for females. The per capita income for the town was $20,545. About 14.2% of families and 19.6% of the total population were below the poverty line.

Of the population of 1,427 persons age 16 and older, 55.9% were in the labor force, all of which worked in civilian occupations.

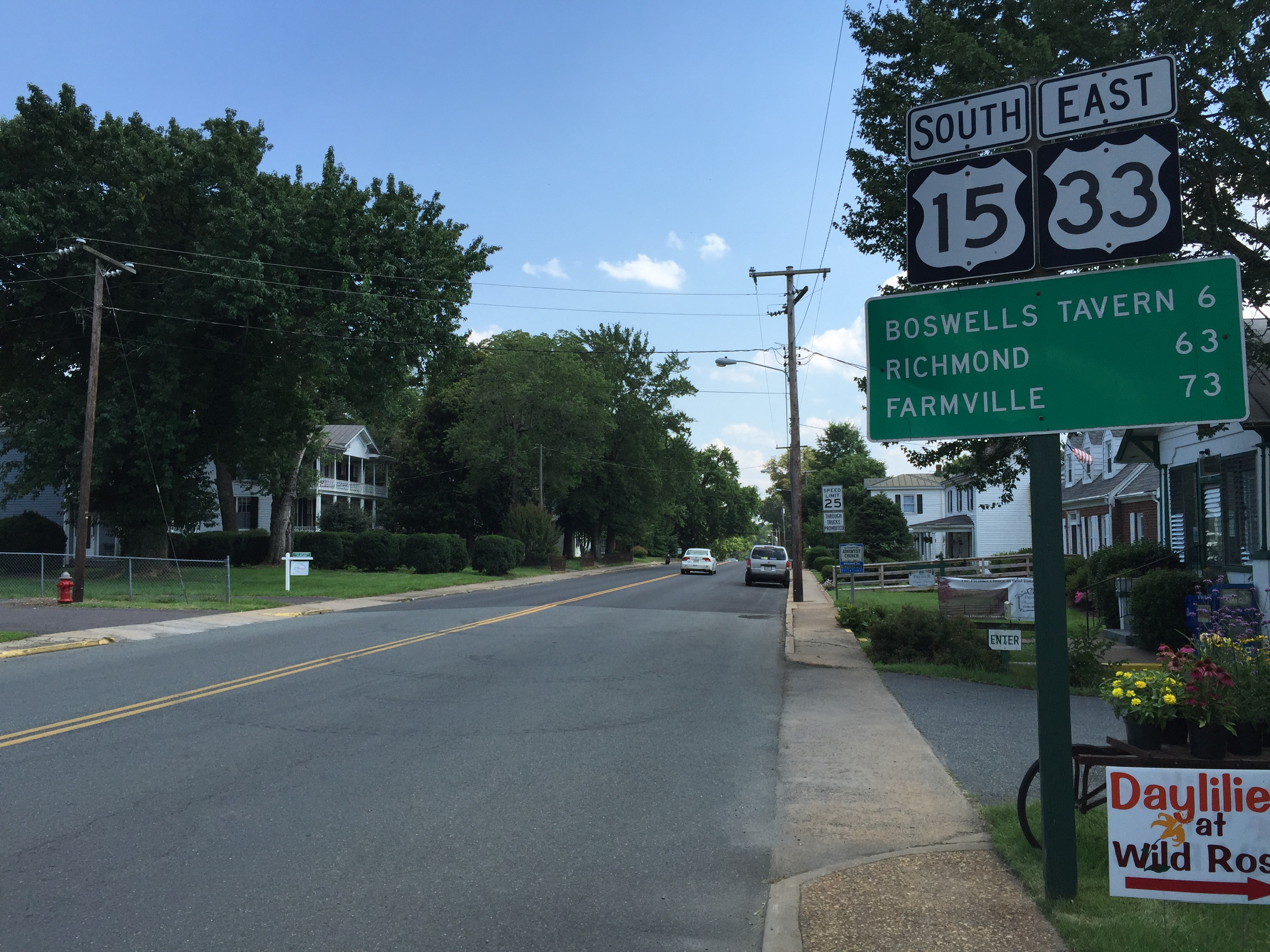
View south along US 15 and east along US 33 in Gordonsville

== Transportation ==
U.S. Route 15 and U.S. Route 33 are the main highways providing access to Gordonsville. US 15 extends north to Orange and south to connect with Interstate 64. US 33 extends west to Stanardsville and east to Louisa. Virginia State Route 231 also serves Gordonsville, extending north towards Madison and south towards Charlottesville.

== Notable people ==
- Philip P. Barbour- tenth speaker of the United States House of Representatives and later associate justice of the United States Supreme Court
- Ann Marie Calhoun, violinist
- Marv Goodwin, professional baseball player
- Charlie Waller, founder of the legendary blue grass band "The Country Gentlemen"

== Climate ==
The climate in this area is characterized by hot, humid summers and generally mild to cool winters. According to the Köppen Climate Classification system, Gordonsville has a humid subtropical climate, abbreviated "Cfa" on climate maps.
