= Lake of the Woods, Virginia =

Lake of the Woods
- CDP
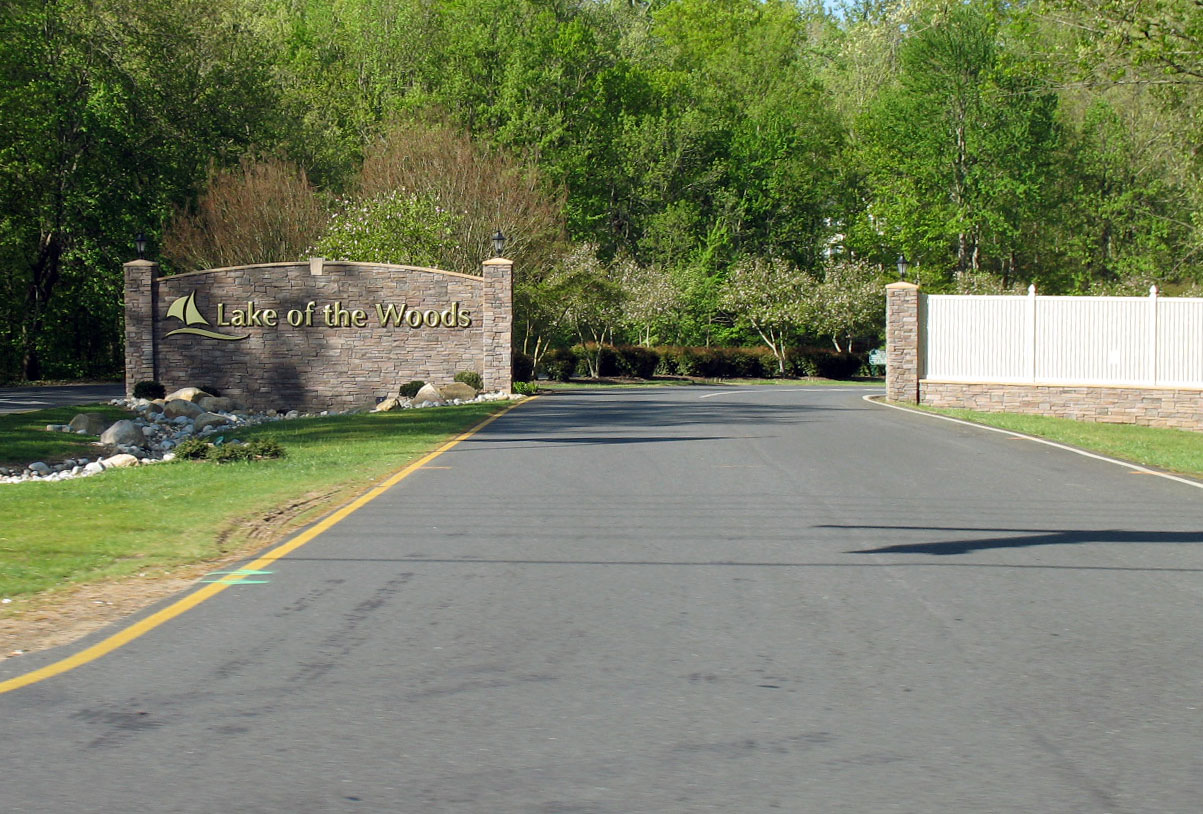
- Lake of the Woods, Locust Grove

- Location within the Commonwealth of Virginia Lake of the Woods (Virginia) Lake of the Woods (the United States)
- Coordinates: 38°20′12″N 77°45′21″W
- Country: United States
- State: Virginia
- County: Orange

Population (2010)
  - Total: 8,170
- Time zone: UTC−5 (Eastern (EST))
  - Summer (DST): UTC−4 (EDT)
- ZIP codes: 22508
- FIPS code: 51-43430
- GNIS feature ID: 2628836

Lake of the Woods is a census-designated place in Locust Grove, Orange County, Virginia, United States. It is a gated subdivision covering approximately 2,600 acres with 4,260 lots (850 with lake frontage) distributed among 16 sections (many named after well-known southern names and landmarks). It includes more than 41 miles of paved private roads, and since 2020 has been listed in the Washington–Baltimore combined statistical area.

Lake of the Woods has grown into a bedroom community for Fredericksburg, within the trade area of Spotsylvania County. As of the 2020 census, Lake of the Woods had a population of 8,081.

Founded as a resort community built around a man-made lake, it now includes two lakes: the Main Lake and Keaton's Lake. The Main Lake covers 500 acres and is fed by Flat Run and numerous springs. Veterans Memorial Dam, spanning 1,450 feet along the northwestern edge of the Main Lake, was built in 1968. The Main Lake ranges in depth from two feet at the upper southwestern end, where Flat Run feeds the lake, to 45 feet at the upper end near the dam. It has two marinas, seven lake access areas, and eight sand beaches. Keaton's Lake is a 35-acre impoundment approximately seven feet deep, at the northeastern corner of the community, close to Route 3; its dam spans 450 feet.

Lake of the Woods has its own Volunteer Fire and Rescue company.

Lake of the Woods was created in 1967 by Virginia Wildlife Clubs, a subsidiary of U.S. Land, Inc., and subsequently bought and developed into single family owner occupied housing by Boise Cascade Corporation. The Lake of the Woods Association, Inc. assumed ownership of the common areas and control in 1972.

Lake of the Woods, just outside of Spotsylvania County/Fredericksburg, is in the northern neck of Orange County where the cross-commuting interchange with the Washington Metropolitan Area is high enough to merit inclusion in the Metropolitan Area, although more farther south parts of Orange County are more rural and still cause the overall county-wide commuter interchange to fall below the threshold for inclusion in the Washington Metropolitan Area which is calculated by the county level. In 2020, Lake of the Woods began being listed on US Census data as part of Combined Statistical Area within Washington, DC-Baltimore, MD-Arlington, VA.

== Demographics ==
Historical population
Census	Pop.	Note	%±
2010	7,177		—
2020	8,081		12.6%
U.S. Decennial Census; 2010 2020

Lake of the Woods was first listed as a census designated place in the 2010 U.S. census.
