= Locust Grove, Orange County, Virginia =

Unincorporated community in Virginia, United States

Coordinates: 38°16′52.3″N 77°43′33.5″W

Locust Grove
- Unincorporated community
- Interactive map of Locust Grove
- Country: United States
- State: Virginia
- County: Orange County

Population
  - Total: 14,748
- Postal code: 22508
- Area code: 540

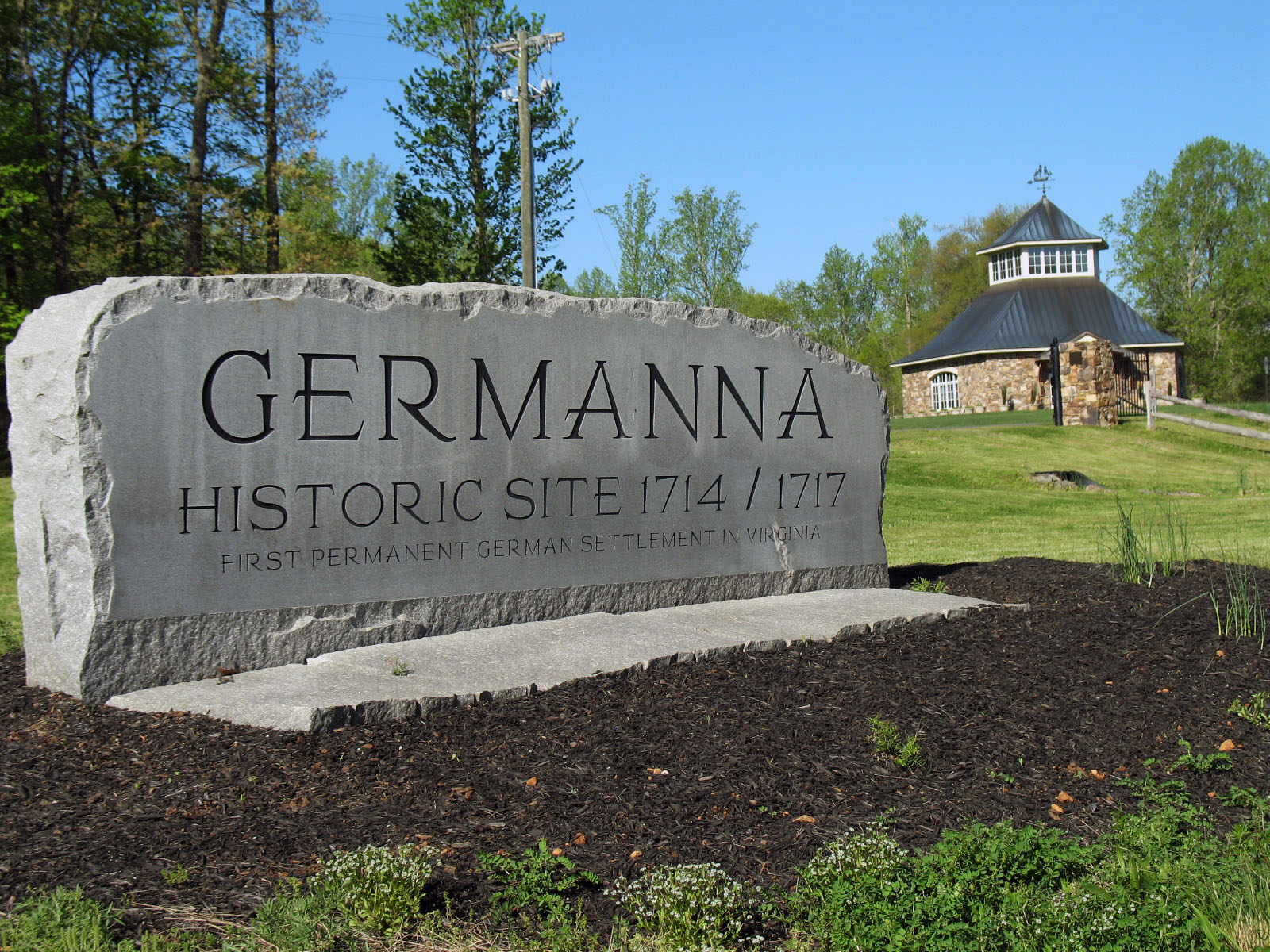
Germanna Visitor Center

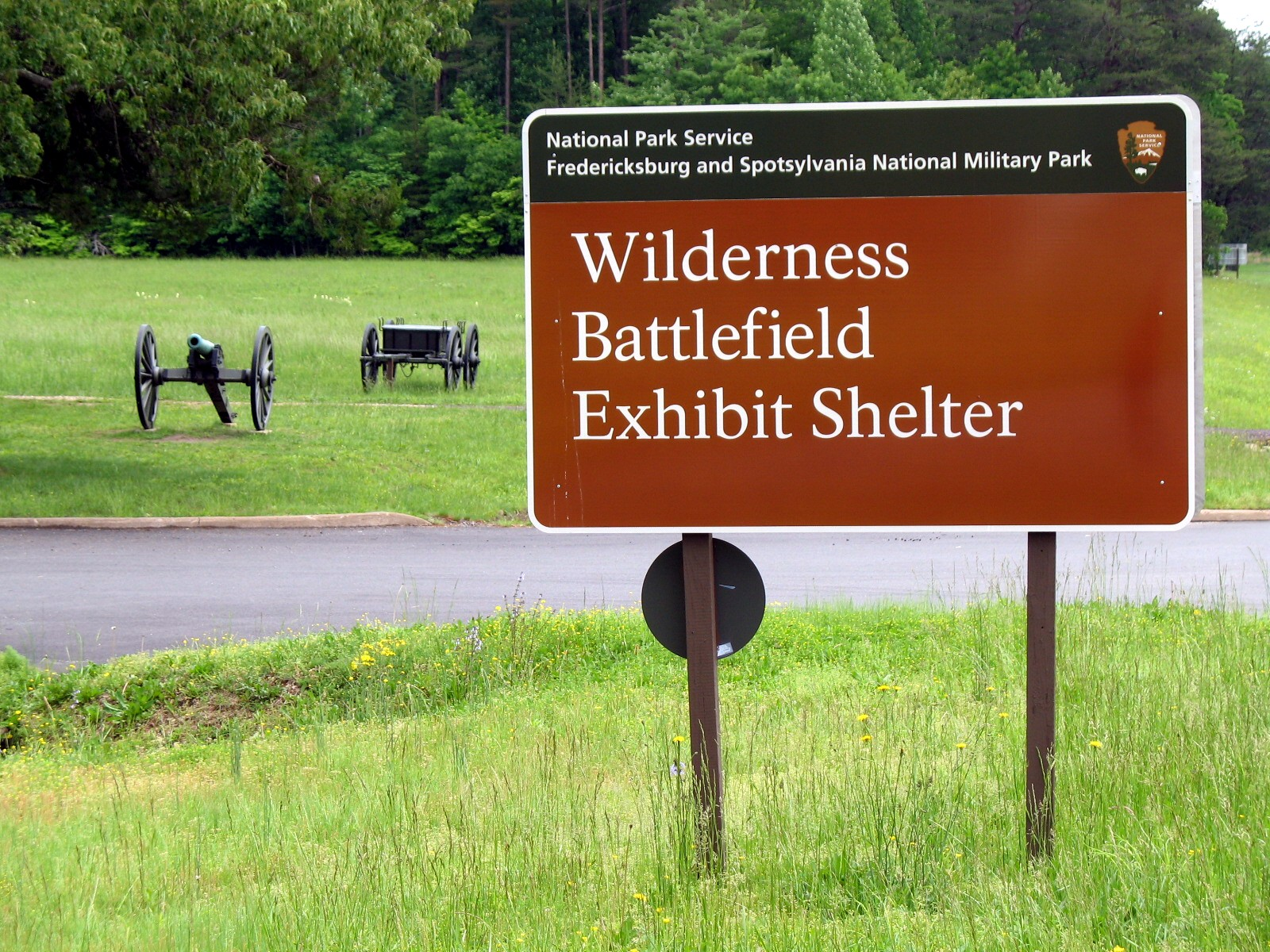
Wilderness Battlefield Exhibit

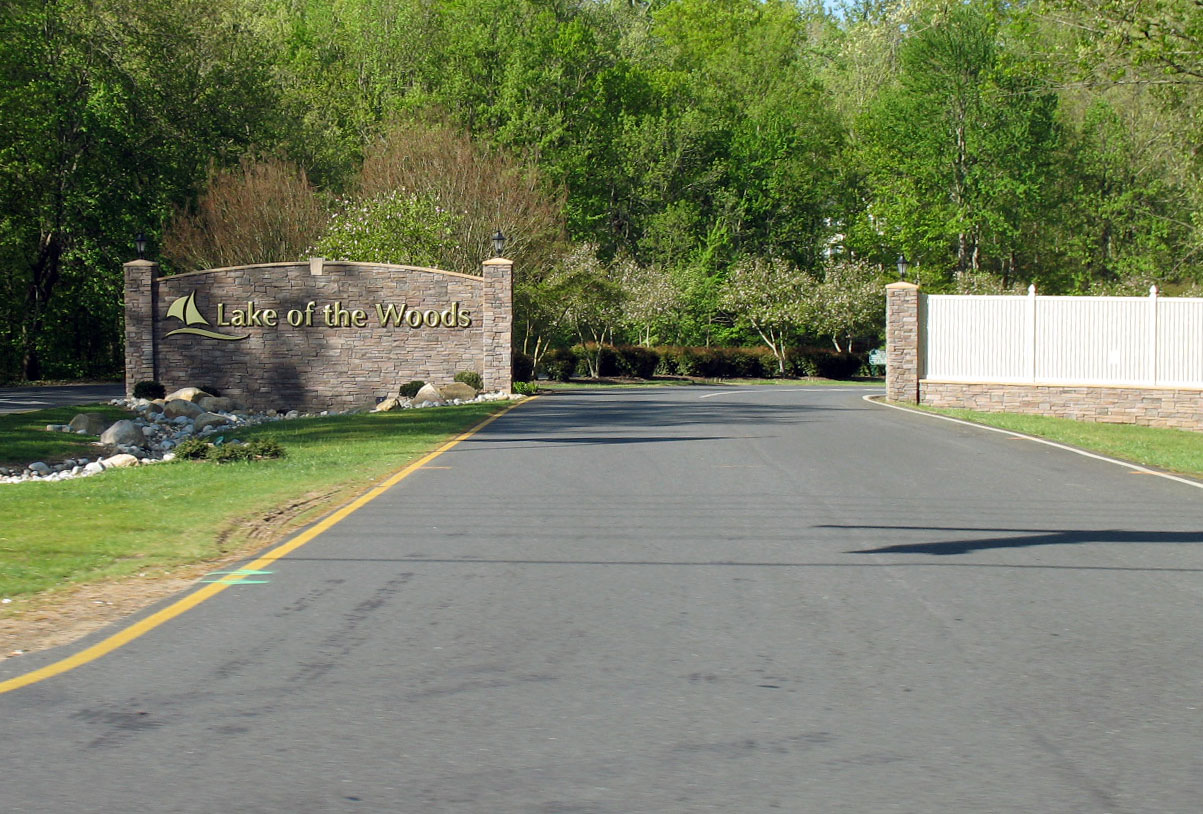
Flat Run/Lake of the Woods

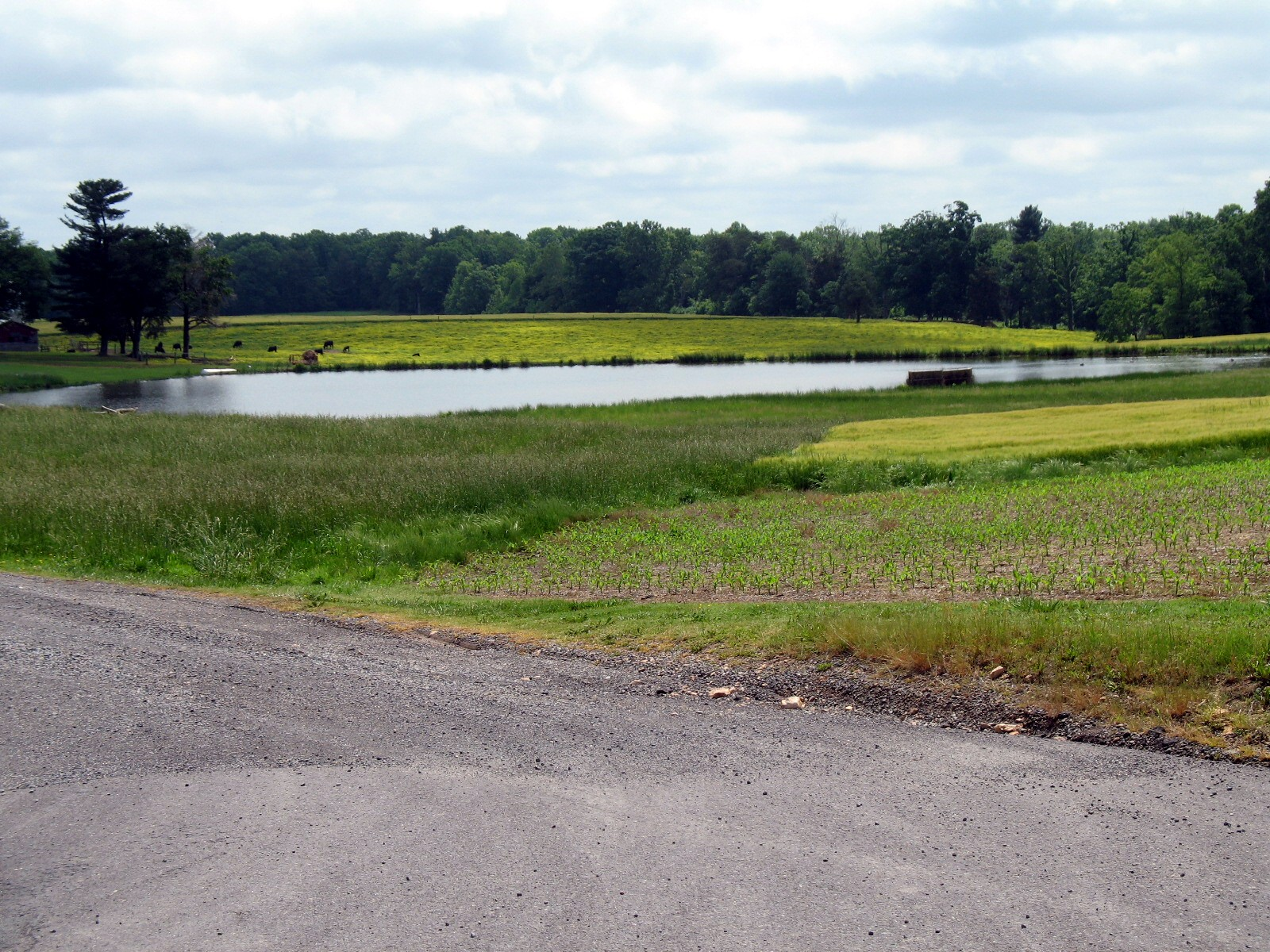
Gold Dale

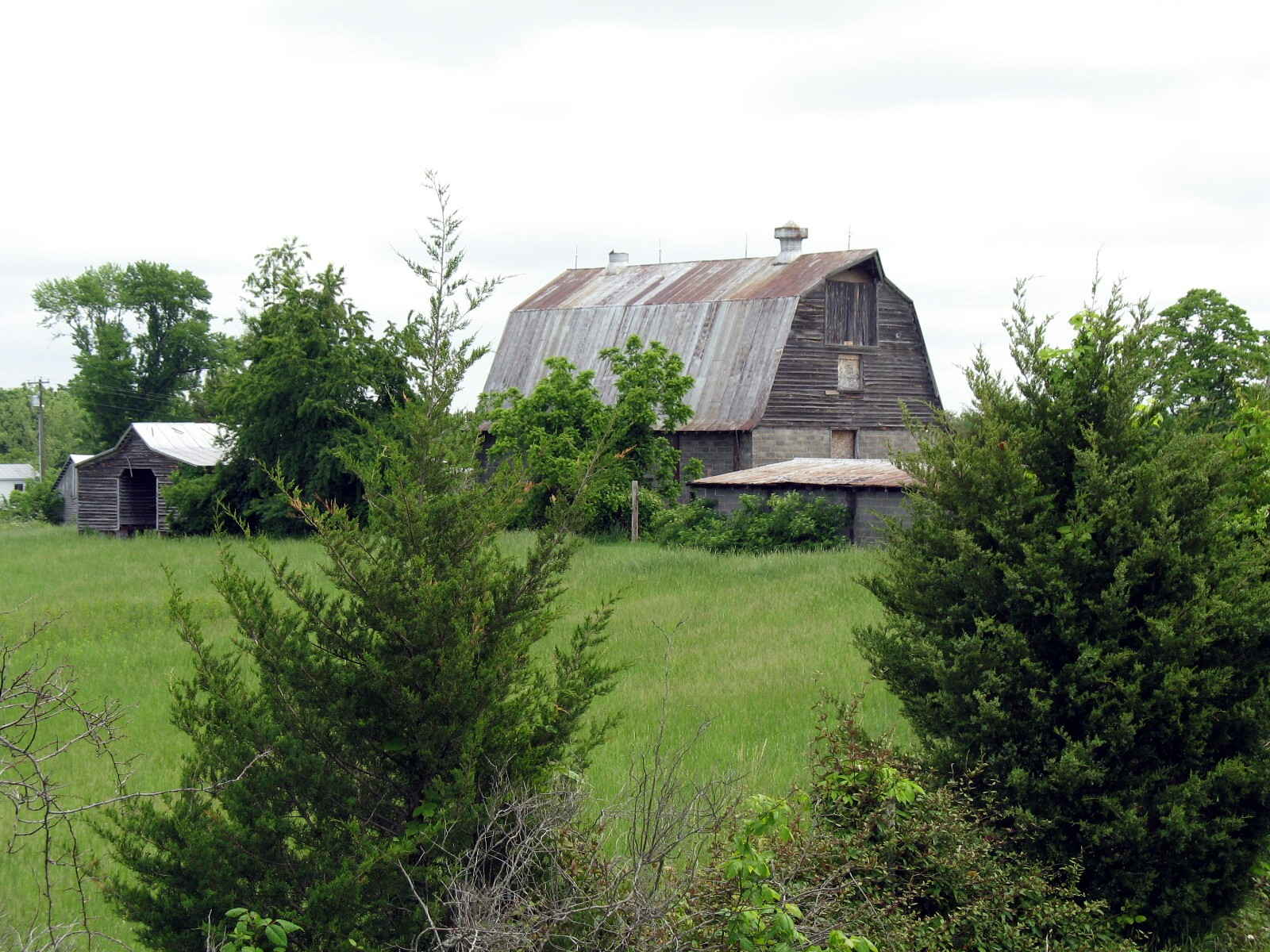
Indiantown

Locust Grove is an unincorporated community in eastern Orange County, Virginia, United States. Its ZIP code is 22508, the population of the ZIP Code Tabulation Area was 14,748 at the time of the 2020 census making it the largest population center within the county. While Locust Grove has historically been centered on the intersection of State Routes 20 and 611, most of the current population and commercial activity is located along the State Route 3 corridor, several miles to the east. It is named after the Black Locust trees common to the area.

== History ==
Established by Lieutenant Governor Alexander Spotswood in 1714 as a German settlement, the area was considered the westernmost frontier (the wilderness) of Virginia. Spotswood built a home on a portion of the Rapidan River he referred to as Porto Bella (Lovely Harbor). The home was later nicknamed in 1732 by the founder of the city of Richmond, William Byrd II, as Spotwood's "Enchanted Castle". Spotswood died in 1740 and shortly thereafter residents of the area burned the original structure to salvage building materials for their own homes.

During the American Civil War the Rapidan River served as a portion of the front line between the Confederacy and the Union. The Old Plank Road connected Fredericksburg with Culpeper and crossed the Rapidan River at a location referred to as Germanna Ford. This ford was used extensively by the Union leading up to the battles of Chancellorsville, Mine Run, the Wilderness, and Spotsylvania Court House. The Battle of the Wilderness occurred from May 5 to May 7, 1864 in portions of current-day Locust Grove. Union Army Commander Ulysses S. Grant's headquarters were located 5 miles southeast of Germanna Ford on a hill near the modern-day intersections of Route 3 and Route 20.

== Geography ==
There are five distinct hamlets comprising the town of Locust Grove.

- Germanna: Outlined by the Rapidan River the area is bordered by Flat Run and Culpeper County. This area includes Germanna Ford, the Germanna Visitor Center, the remains of Spotswood's Enchanted Castle, and the Locust Grove campus of the Germanna Community College. It is accessible along the Route 3 corridor between the river and Flat Run Road (Route 601).
- The Wilderness: Is home of Ellwood Manor, the burial place of General Thomas "Stonewall" Jackson's left arm, the remains of the Wilderness tavern, and the Wilderness Battlefield exhibit, it is bordered to the south by Spotsylvania County, and extends from the intersections of the Germanna Highway (Route 3) and the Constitution Highway (Route 20) westward to Zoar Road (Route 611).
- Flat Run: Lies between the Wilderness and Germanna areas along the Route 3 corridor. The Flat Run area consists of the Lake of the Woods, a housing tract surrounding a man-made body of water supplied by the Flat Run, and Meadows Farms Golf Course, home of the longest golf hole in the U.S (Par 6, 841 yds.).
- Gold Dale: Located to the west of Route 611, and south of Route 20, the area is primarily agricultural land. It is bordered by the town of Mine Run (to the west) and Spotsylvania County (to the south). It is the home of the Locust Grove Primary School, and the historic Orange/Old Plank Road (Route 621) that was used extensively in the Civil War.
- Indiantown: Comprises the greatest total area of Locust Grove but is largely undeveloped. It is bordered by the Rapidan River to the north, by Flat Run to the East, and Route 20 to the south. The area is primarily wooded and bisected by Indiantown Road (Route 603).

== Development ==
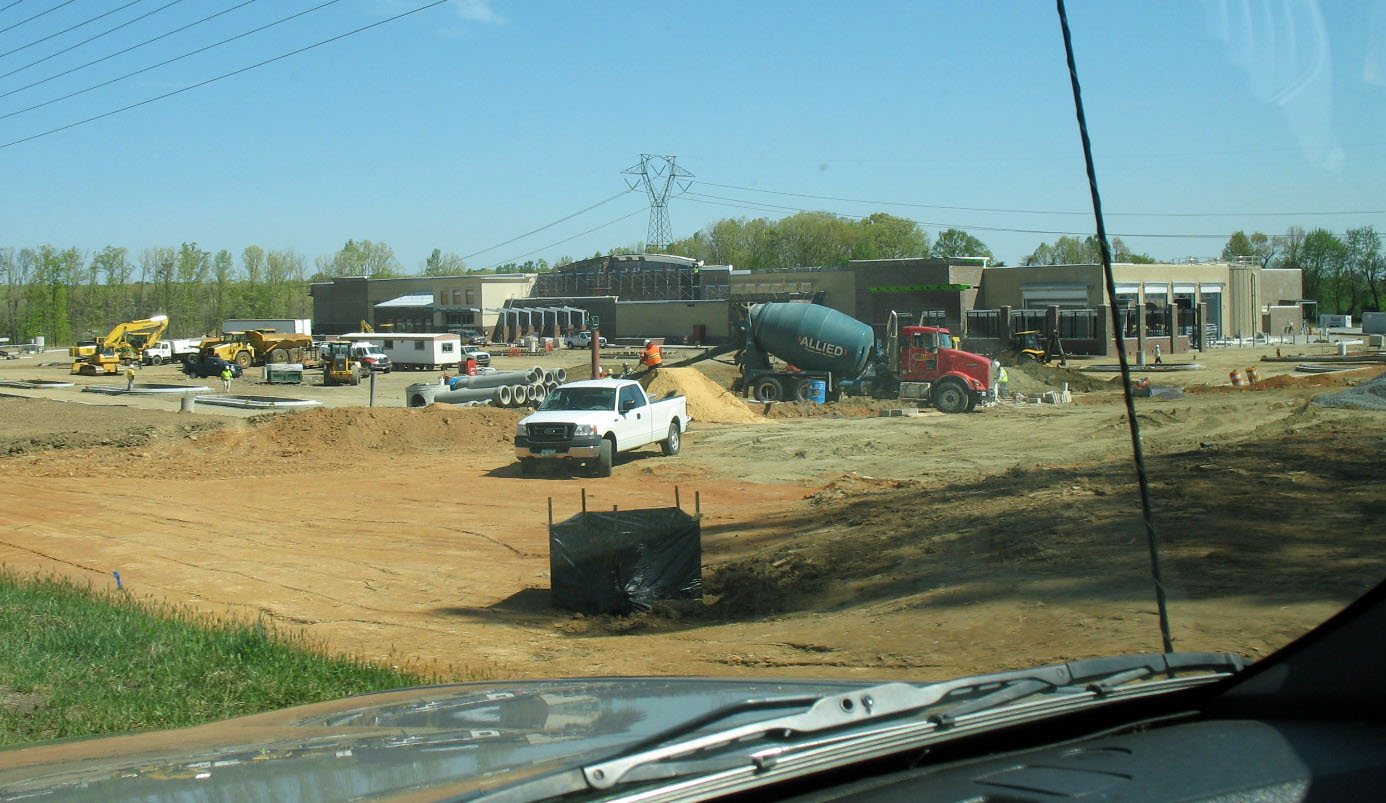
Germanna WalMart

Beginning in 2008, the community became the focus of well-publicized battles between preservationists and Orange County officials who had approved Wal-Mart Stores' plans to build a Walmart Supercenter along Route 3 on land near the Wilderness battlefield; Walmart chose a new location in the Germanna area, which opened for business on July 10, 2013.

Subsequent to the announcement of the new location, the county board of supervisors reduced the amount of tax revenue collected annually through the merchants capital tax by 15% (11% in 2010, 2% in 2011, and 2% in 2012); this tax is determined by the value of inventory carried by a local business. In 2011, the county lost $599,690 in revenue provided by the federal government, and rather than adjust the annual budget or restore the merchants capital tax, the board approved a 16% personal property tax increase to raise an additional $666,141 of revenue for the county.

The modification of the tax code has left many local residents disappointed with both the county and Walmart, which was initially sold to the public as a source of tax revenue.

On February 21, 2013, members of the Orange County planning commission voted to approve a re-zoning application in the Germanna area, and re-designate what had been an Agricultural zone to a commercial and high-density residential area. Despite 90% of the local residents in attendance request for denial, among ethical and conflict of interest issues, the application was passed by J.P. Tucker III (Owner of a construction company), Andy Hutchinson (Owner of a sod company), and Donald Brooks (political candidate for Sheriff).

In May 2013, the county board of supervisors passed a resolution to create the Route 3 Strategic Initiative; this resolution was based on a nine-year-old survey taken at the beginning of the 60% increase in population during the 2000s. Public comment was solicited in three half-hour sessions only after the board dinner break during three monthly board meetings. The initiative, which impacts Districts 4 and 5 is being spearheaded by District 2 supervisor Jim White, and may further the conflict between developers and local residents wishing to keep the area rural in character.

An October 2013 revision of the Orange County comprehensive plan generated much public derision when its goal to "Sustain the rural character of Orange County while enhancing and improving the quality of life for all its citizens" conflicted with its pro-development content. Despite the public outcry, the plan was passed by the Board of Supervisors on December 17, 2013, by a vote of 3–1.

On December 9, 2014, Orange County supervisors Lee Frame and James White, planning commission member P. Nigel Goodwin, and Economic Authority members William Hager and Winston Sides proposed a land use plan entitled the Germanna-Wilderness Area Plan (GWAP) after consulting with private sector developers, financial analysts, and engineers, without seeking input from local residents. The plan was created over 570 days, and residents had 24 days to comment on the plan.
