= Tibbstown, Virginia =

Unincorporated community in Virginia, United States

Tibbstown is an unincorporated community and historic settlement in Orange County, Virginia.

It is said to be named after the Reverend Frank Tibbs.

Tibbstown is considered to be one of eight documented "Freetowns" in Orange County, places where formerly enslaved Black people settled near the plantations on which they worked rather than migrating elsewhere. According to the website "No Tibbs in Tibbstown," residents, "built their own houses, cleared the land to farm it, went to church, started their own businesses, socialized with their friends, attended school. They built communities, families, friendships, and a trusted network to protect themselves from the world around them.

Another Freetown to the northwest of Tibbstown, just over the boundary in Greene County, is Lewiston, located on Albano Road south of Tom's Road. It is a mile and a half south of Scuffletown.
