= Gordonsville Historic District =

Historic district in Virginia, United States

- U.S. National Register of Historic Places
- U.S. Historic district
- Virginia Landmarks Register
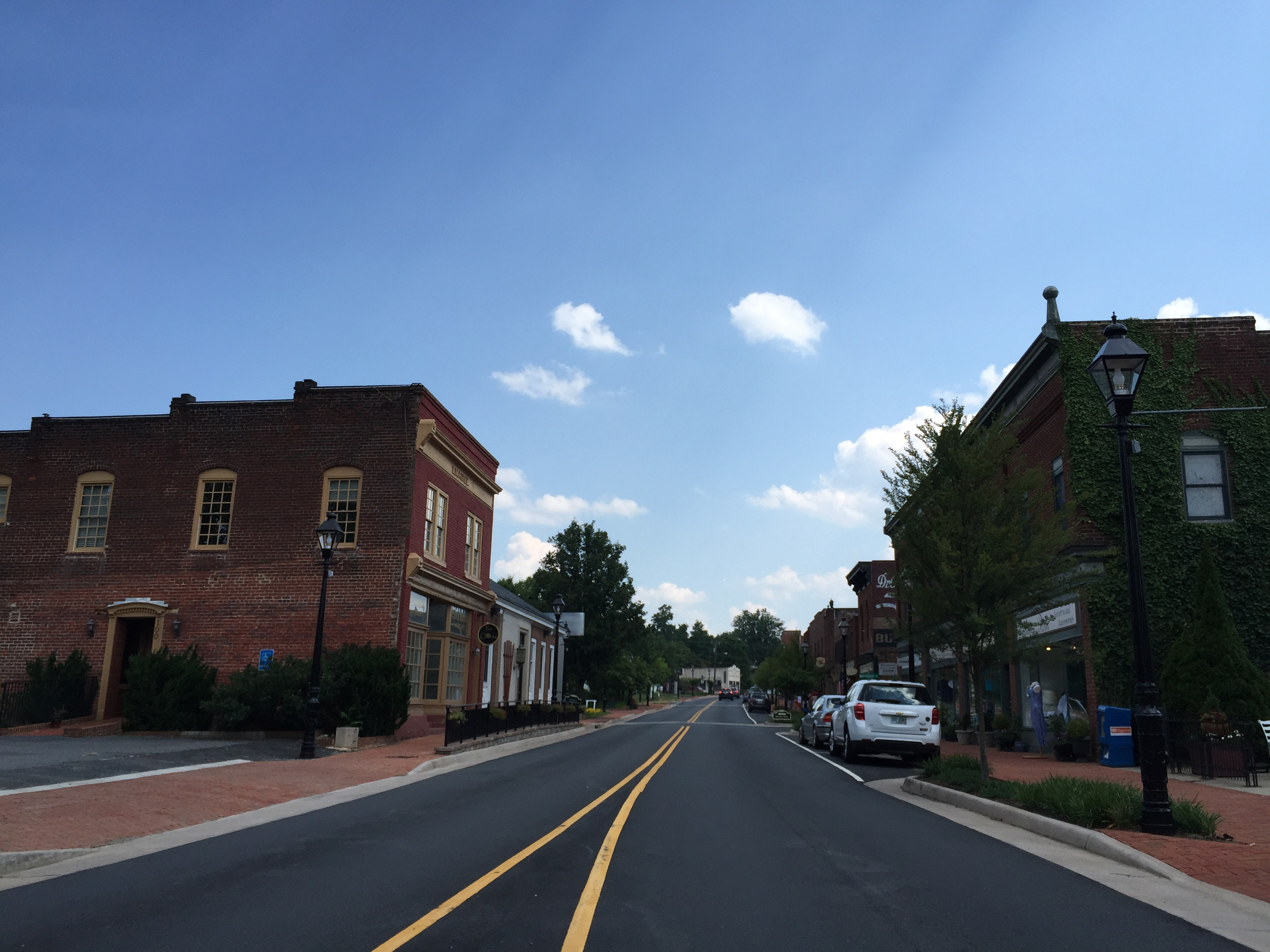
- Central Gordonsville in July 2016

- Location within Virginia Location within the United States
- Location: VA 15 and vicinity, Gordonsville, Virginia
- Coordinates: 38°8′14″N 78°11′16″W
- Area: 58 acres (23 ha)
- Architectural style: Colonial Revival, Greek Revival, Georgian Revival
- NRHP reference No.: 83004250
- VLR No.: 225-0030

Significant dates
- Added to NRHP: October 13, 1983
- Designated VLR: August 16, 1983

Gordonsville Historic District is a national historic district located at Gordonsville, Orange County, Virginia. It encompasses 85 contributing buildings and 2 contributing structures in the town of Gordonsville. They include 19th- and early 20th-century residential, commercial and institutional buildings in a variety of popular architectural styles including Colonial Revival, Greek Revival, and Georgian Revival styles. Notable buildings include the E.J. Faulconer House (c. 1856), Faulconer-Schlosser House (1868), Linney-Barbour Building (1870), Swan-Payne House (1901), Magnolia House (c. 1873), Gordonsville Christian Church (18523, c. 1920), Gordonsville Presbyterian Church (1855), Gordonsville Methodist Church (1873), St. Mark's Catholic (c. 1880), Christ Episcopal Church (c. 1875), Grammar School (1877-1878), Memorial Hall, Sneed's Store (c. 1855), Allman Building, Gordonsville Motor Car Company Building (c. 1922), The Old Oaken Bucket (c. 1920), and the Blakey Building (1916). Located in the district is the separately listed Exchange Hotel.

It was listed on the National Register of Historic Places in 1983.
