= Burr Hill, Virginia =

Unincorporated community in Virginia, United States

- Unincorporated community
- Location within Virginia Location within the United States
- Coordinates: 38°20′38″N 77°51′35″W
- Country: United States
- State: Virginia
- County: Orange
- Elevation: 276 ft (84 m)
- Time zone: UTC-5 (Eastern (EST))
  - Summer (DST): UTC-4 (EDT)
- ZIP Code: 22433
- Area code: 540
- GNIS feature ID: 1495339

Burr Hill is an unincorporated community in Orange County, Virginia, United States. The community is 11.5 miles (18.5 km) southeast of Culpeper.

Burr Hill has a post office with ZIP Code 22433. According to longtime postmaster Glenda Jarrell, the post office opened circa 1860 and briefly closed during the American Civil War; it currently occupies a single room in a former general store building.
