= Orange County, Virginia =

County in Virginia, United States

- County
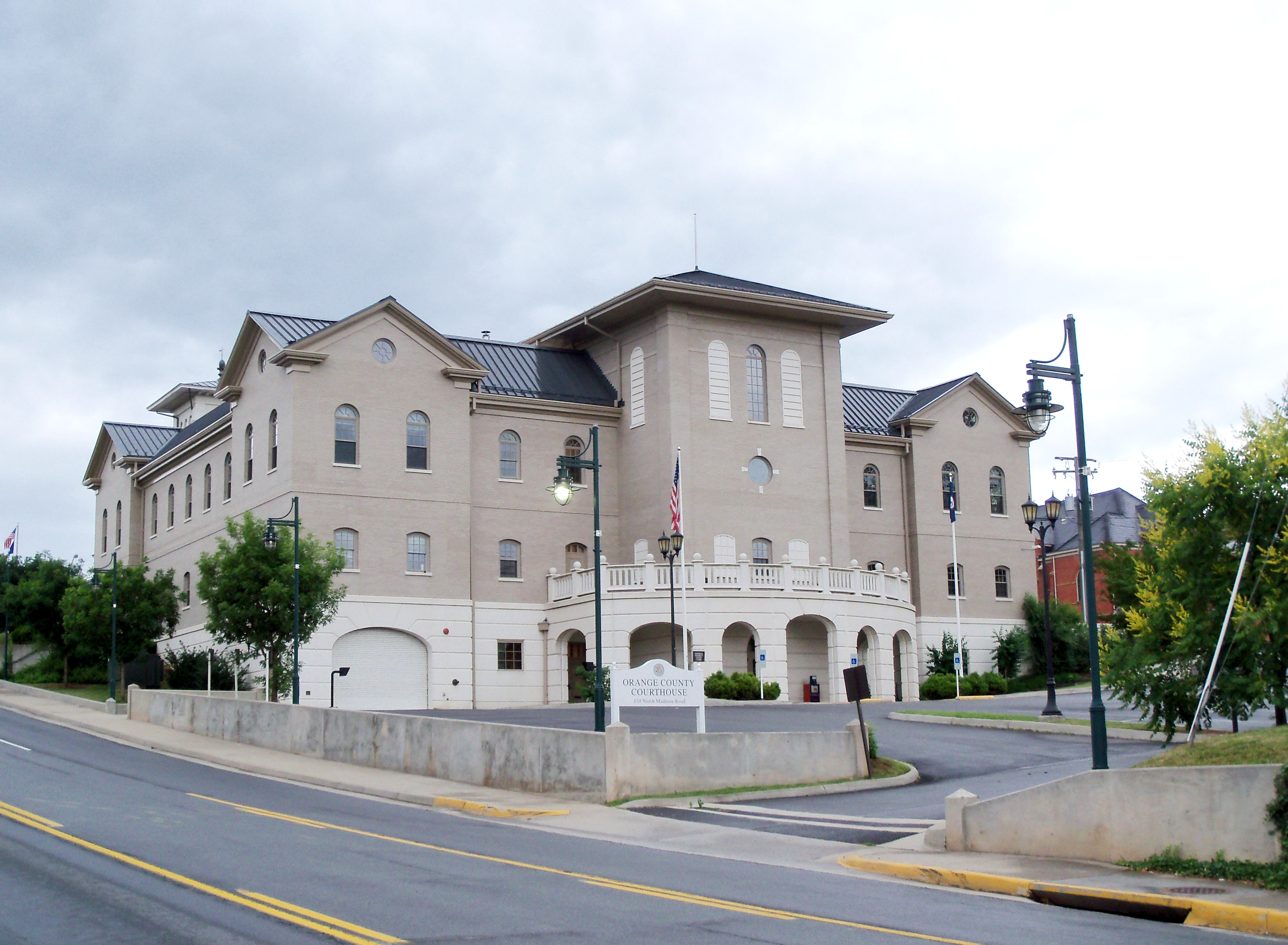
- Orange County Courthouse

- Seal

- Location within the U.S. state of Virginia
- Coordinates: 38°14′N 78°01′W
- Country: United States
- State: Virginia
- Founded: 1734
- Named for: William III of England
- Seat: Orange
- Largest town: Lake of the Woods

Area
  - Total: 343 sq mi (890 km^{2})
  - Land: 341 sq mi (880 km^{2})
  - Water: 2.5 sq mi (6.5 km^{2}) 0.7%

Population (2020)
  - Total: 36,254
  - Estimate (2025): 40,083 ▲
  - Density: 110/sq mi (42/km^{2})
- Time zone: UTC−5 (Eastern)
  - Summer (DST): UTC−4 (EDT)
- Congressional district: 7th
- Website: orangecountyva.gov

Orange County is located in the central Piedmont region of the Commonwealth of Virginia. At the 2020 census, the population was 36,254. Its county seat is Orange. Orange County includes Montpelier, the 2,700-acre (1,100 ha) estate of James Madison, the 4th president of the United States and often known as the "father of the Constitution". The county celebrated its 290th anniversary in 2024.

== History ==
The area was inhabited for thousands of years by various cultures of indigenous peoples. At the time of European encounter, the Ontponea, a sub-group of the Tutelo-speaking Manahoac, lived in this Piedmont area.

The first European settlement in what was to become Orange County was Germanna, formed when Governor Alexander Spotswood settled 12 immigrant families from Westphalia, Germany, there in 1714; a total of 42 people. Orange County, as a legal entity, was created in August 1734 when the Virginia House of Burgesses adopted An Act for Dividing Spotsylvania County. Unlike other counties whose boundaries had ended at the Blue Ridge Mountains, Orange was bounded on the west "by the utmost limits of Virginia" which, at that time, stretched to the Mississippi River and the Great Lakes. The Colony of Virginia claimed the land, but very little of it had yet been occupied by any English. For this reason, some contend that Orange County was at one time the largest county that ever existed. This situation lasted only four years; in 1738 most of the western tract was split off into Augusta County. The expansiveness of the county boundaries was to encourage settlement further westward as well as to contend against the French claim to the Ohio Valley region.

No battles of the American Revolution were fought in Orange County. However, two companies of 50 men each were recruited from Orange County to the Culpeper Minutemen. One was led by Col. Lawrence Taliaferro. In December 1775, this company fought in the Battle of Great Bridge. Orange County's Committee of Safety was also active in providing money, salt, horses, guns, beef, and other supplies to Continental forces.

Orange County prospered with the development of several railroad routes through Orange and Gordonsville in the 1840s and 1850s. They succeeded the plank road between Fredericksburg and Orange, which connected with two important roads: the Richmond Road between the state capital and the Shenandoah Valley (which passed through Louisa) and a stagecoach route to Charlottesville and points south. The Orange and Alexandria Railroad and Virginia Central Railroad helped foster a diversified agricultural economy in Orange County, bringing produce and timber to markets in Richmond, Washington D.C., and Norfolk as well as more industrial products. The final adjustment of the county's boundaries occurred in 1838 when Greene County was created from the western portion of Orange. The Town of Orange was legally established in 1834 (officially becoming a town in 1872) and had already served as the county seat for nearly a century; Gordonsville officially achieved town status in 1870.

During the Civil War, the towns of Orange and Gordonsville continued as important railroad hubs and hospital centers for the Confederacy. Confederate military companies recruited from the county included three companies of the 13th Virginia Infantry, the Gordonsville Grays, two artillery companies, one cavalry company (the Orange Rangers), and many soldiers in the 7th Virginia Infantry, Wise Artillery and 6th Virginia Cavalry. General Robert E. Lee often rode through the county and wintered the Army of Northern Virginia in Orange County during 1863–64, the Rapidan River becoming a defensive line. Cavalry raids against the railroad supply lines occurred, including several at Rapidan on the border with Culpeper County. Troops often crossed the Rapidan River at Germanna Ford near Locust Grove. After Fredericksburg fell to Union forces, Mosby's Rangers were formed and conducted some operations (as well as recovered from wounds) in Orange County; Mosby himself was once captured while waiting for a train in Beaverdam in Hanover County for travel through Orange County. The 1863 Battle of Mine Run and the 1864 Battle of the Wilderness both occurred in eastern Orange County, as Union troops drove toward the Confederacy's capital. The latter became a significant turning point in the war.

Following Virginia's readmission to the Union in 1870, the railroads were rebuilt (many being consolidated into the Chesapeake and Ohio Railroad after 1868). The county was also divided into Barbour, Madison, Taylor, and Gordon townships, named after important pre-war citizens. The agricultural economy resumed despite the loss of slave labor (6,111 slaves had lived in the county in 1860, valued at $1.5 million), with more livestock and dairy farming both because such required less physical labor and because the railroads could deliver those agricultural products to larger markets relatively quickly and cheaply. Virginia Governor James L. Kemper (1874-1878) moved from Madison County to near Orange as his term ended. Agriculture and manufacturing continued to expand into the twentieth century, with a peak of 1279 farms and 20 manufacturing companies located within the county as of 1929. A manufacturing survey taken during the Great Depression noted that Orange County's economy remained relatively healthy due to its accessibility. The county's population fluctuated following the Civil War up through the 1930s. From that point forward, the population continued to grow steadily, representing an almost 300% increase through the 2010 Census.

In 1991, the Virginia Landmarks Register designated approximately 31,200 acres (126 km^{2}) in the county's western portion as the Madison-Barbour Rural Historic District. The largest such district in the Commonwealth includes James Madison's Montpelier, James Barbour's Thomas Jefferson-designed Barboursville mansion (now in ruins), several plantations, portions of the Monticello Viticultural Area, as well as numerous individual sites listed on the National Register. The Gordonsville Historic District was added to the National Register of Historic Places in 1984, the Rapidan Historic District in 1987, and the Orange Commercial Historic District added to the NRHP in 1999.

== Geography ==

According to the U.S. Census Bureau, the county has a total area of 343 square miles (890 km^{2}), of which 341 square miles (880 km^{2}) is land and 2.5 square miles (6.5 km^{2}) (0.7%) is water. The terrain is characterized by rolling hills, generally increasing in altitude and slope as they continue westward toward the Blue Ridge Mountains. The highest point is Cowherd Mountain at 1,196 ft (365 m), approximately 2.5 miles (4.0 km) northwest of Gordonsville.

Orange County lies within the watersheds of both the Rappahannock River and the York River, both of which drain into the Chesapeake Bay.

=== Adjacent counties ===
- Madison County – northwest
- Culpeper County – north
- Spotsylvania County – east
- Louisa County – south
- Albemarle County – southwest
- Greene County – west

=== Water bodies ===
- The Rapidan River defines the northern boundary of the county.
- Lake Orange is a 124-acre public lake southeast of the Town of Orange.
- Lake of the Woods, Virginia includes the 500-acre Main Lake. The smaller Keaton's Lake is a 35-acre impoundment of Lake of the Woods.

=== Nationally protected areas ===
- The Wilderness Battlefield in the eastern portion of the county lies within the Fredericksburg & Spotsylvania National Military Park.

== Transportation ==
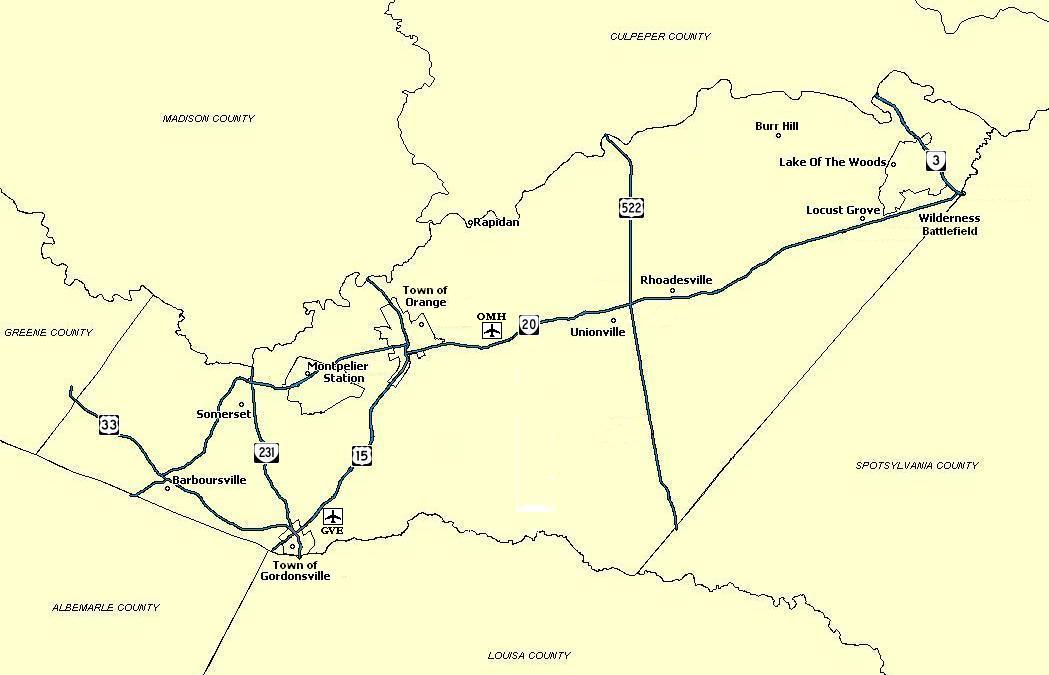
Map of Orange County

=== Major highways ===
- US 15
- US 33
- US 522
- SR 3
- SR 20
- SR 231

=== Airports ===
- Orange County Airport (OMH)
- Gordonsville Airport (GVE)

=== Public transportation ===
- The Town of Orange Transit (TOOT) provides bus service around and between the towns of Orange and Gordonsville.

== Demographics ==
Historical population
Census	Pop.	Note	%±
1790	9,921		—
1800	11,449		15.4%
1810	12,323		7.6%
1820	12,913		4.8%
1830	14,637		13.4%
1840	9,125		−37.7%
1850	10,067		10.3%
1860	10,851		7.8%
1870	10,396		−4.2%
1880	13,052		25.5%
1890	12,814		−1.8%
1900	12,571		−1.9%
1910	13,486		7.3%
1920	13,320		−1.2%
1930	12,070		−9.4%
1940	12,649		4.8%
1950	12,755		0.8%
1960	12,900		1.1%
1970	13,792		6.9%
1980	18,063		31.0%
1990	21,421		18.6%
2000	25,881		20.8%
2010	33,481		29.4%
2020	36,254		8.3%
2025 (est.)	40,083	▲	10.6%
U.S. Decennial Census; 1790-1960 1900-1990; 1990-2000 2010 2020

=== Racial and ethnic composition ===
Orange County, Virginia – Racial and ethnic composition Note: the US Census treats Hispanic/Latino as an ethnic category. This table excludes Latinos from the racial categories and assigns them to a separate category. Hispanics/Latinos may be of any race.
Race / Ethnicity (NH = Non-Hispanic)	Pop 1980	Pop 1990	Pop 2000	Pop 2010	Pop 2020	% 1980	% 1990	% 2000	% 2010	% 2020
White alone (NH)	14,716	18,138	21,629	27,033	27,389	81.47%	84.67%	83.57%	80.74%	75.55%
Black or African American alone (NH)	3,214	3,059	3,556	4,206	4,304	17.79%	14.28%	13.74%	12.56%	11.87%
Native American or Alaska Native alone (NH)	13	30	41	80	92	0.07%	0.14%	0.16%	0.24%	0.25%
Asian alone (NH)	28	43	81	240	311	0.16%	0.20%	0.31%	0.72%	0.86%
Native Hawaiian or Pacific Islander alone (NH)	x	x	4	15	18	x	x	0.02%	0.04%	0.05%
Other race alone (NH)	9	9	37	49	156	0.05%	0.04%	0.14%	0.15%	0.43%
Mixed race or Multiracial (NH)	x	x	203	719	1,813	x	x	0.78%	2.15%	5.00%
Hispanic or Latino (any race)	83	142	330	1,139	2,171	0.46%	0.66%	1.28%	3.40%	5.99%
Total	18,063	21,421	25,881	33,481	36,254	100.00%	100.00%	100.00%	100.00%	100.00%

=== 2020 census ===
As of the 2020 census, the county had a population of 36,254. The median age was 44.6 years. 21.1% of residents were under the age of 18 and 22.0% of residents were 65 years of age or older. For every 100 females there were 93.2 males, and for every 100 females age 18 and over there were 91.5 males age 18 and over.

The racial makeup of the county was 76.9% White, 12.0% Black or African American, 0.5% American Indian and Alaska Native, 0.9% Asian, 0.1% Native Hawaiian and Pacific Islander, 2.3% from some other race, and 7.3% from two or more races. Hispanic or Latino residents of any race comprised 6.0% of the population.

43.3% of residents lived in urban areas, while 56.7% lived in rural areas.

There were 14,190 households in the county, of which 28.4% had children under the age of 18 living with them and 25.3% had a female householder with no spouse or partner present. About 24.7% of all households were made up of individuals and 12.5% had someone living alone who was 65 years of age or older.

There were 15,671 housing units, of which 9.5% were vacant. Among occupied housing units, 78.1% were owner-occupied and 21.9% were renter-occupied. The homeowner vacancy rate was 1.5% and the rental vacancy rate was 6.5%.

=== 2010 Census ===
At the 2010 census there were 33,481 people, 12,895 households (14,616 total housing units) and 9,342 families residing in the county. The county experienced a population increase of 29%, or 7,600 people, since the 2000 census. This ties with Louisa County as the 11th fastest growing county in the commonwealth, and one of the fastest outside of Northern Virginia. The racial makeup of the county was 82.4% White, 12.7% Black or African American, 0.3% Native American, 0.7% Asian, 0.01% Pacific Islander, 1.4% from other races, and 2.4% from two or more races. 3.4% of the population were Hispanic or Latino of any race.

Of the 12,895 households, 27.8% had children under the age of 18 living with them, 56.8% were married couples living together, 10.9% had a female householder with no husband present, and 27.6% were non-families. Out of the total number of households, 32.6% housed someone who was 65 years of age or older. The average household size was 2.55 and the average family size was 2.97.

The age distribution of the population was 22.9% under the age of 18, 6.7% from 18 to 24, 10.7% from 25 to 44, 28.5% from 45 to 64, and 18.1% who were 65 years of age or older. The median age was 42.6 years. For every 100 females there were 96 males.

The median household income was $56,837 and the median family income was $65,195. The per capita income was $26,820 and approximately 11.5% of the population was below the poverty line. Orange County had the 9th longest mean travel time to work (37 minutes) out of 132 Virginia localities polled. The median home value was $238,500.

== Education ==
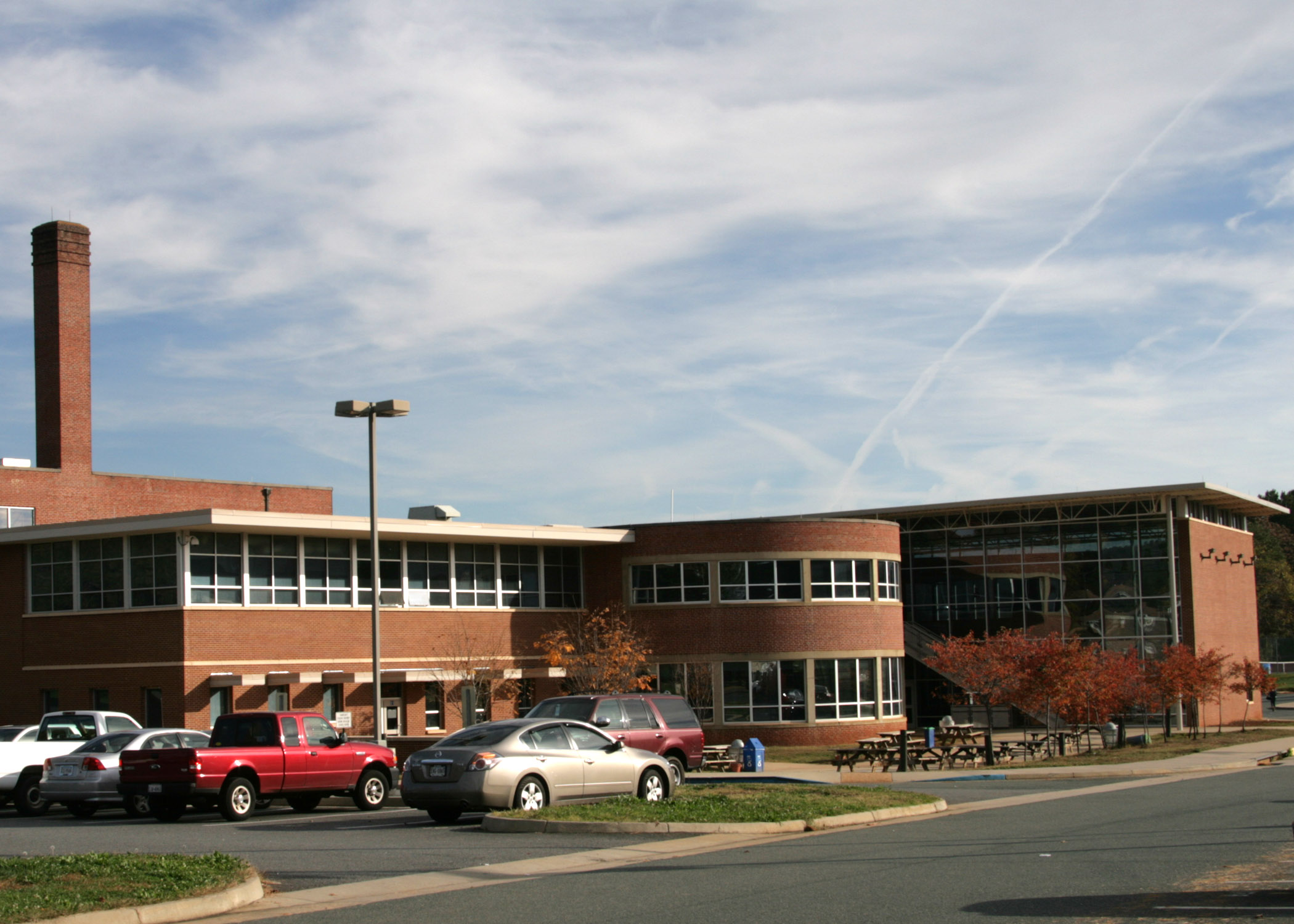
Orange County High School

Primary and secondary education is provided by Orange County Public Schools, whose current (as of August 2025) superintendent is Dr. Daniel Hornick. The school board is represented by five elected officials, one from each district, whose terms run for three years.

The following are the current school board members.

Position	Name	District	Year Elected
Chair	Darlene Dawson	Two	2023
Vice-Chair	Jack Rickett	Three	2023
Member	Rod Hawkins	One	2025
Member	Tina Whittington	Four	2025
Member	Sandy Harrington	Five	2023

=== Primary schools ===
- Gordon-Barbour Elementary
- Lightfoot Elementary
- Locust Grove Elementary
- Locust Grove Primary
- Orange Elementary
- Unionville Elementary

=== Secondary schools ===
- Locust Grove Middle
- Prospect Heights Middle
- Orange County High School

=== Post-secondary ===
Germanna Community College maintains a 65,000 ft^{2} (6,000 m^{2}) facility on a 100-acre campus in Locust Grove which houses the college's Nursing and Allied Health programs. The facility, as part of the Virginia Community College System, includes classrooms, laboratories, faculty offices, a wellness center, student lounge and bookstore, as well as trails throughout the surrounding woodlands. Due to the growing demand for nursing and health professionals, in August 2013, the college has planned for expansion of the campus.

=== Issues ===
In October 2014, 33% of the county-run schools failed to meet state accreditation levels, resulting in a warning being issued by the Virginia Department of Education. If the schools in question, Lightfoot, Unionville, and Prospect Heights, failed to meet accreditation levels for three consecutive years, their accreditation would be denied. County residents paid $51,564,565.00 in taxes for educational operating expenses in 2015, an increase of 11% ($5,684,921.00) in four years.

The former location of the Locust Grove Middle School was abandoned in 2011 after a new school was built less than two miles away. In 2013, plans were under way to return the students to the original location, due to what was referred to as "cohabitation issues" at the new school and a projected "boom" of approximately 20 third graders. This perceived increase was actually a return to prior attendance levels, due to an anomalous single-year decrease. The initial cost to taxpayers to reopen the school was estimated at over $611,000.

In May 2022, a school board member, Chelsea Quintern, introduced two resolutions: one which would ban critical race theory from being taught in the school system, and one which required parental notification of sexually explicit instructional materials, and would separately require schools to "notify parents of healthcare services and involvement in critical decisions affecting students' physical, mental and emotional well-being; including, but not limited to self-identification."

== Government ==
=== Federal ===
The county is part of Virginia's 7th congressional district, and is represented by Democratic Congressman Eugene Vindman.

=== State ===
The county is located fully within Senate District 28 in the State Senate and is split between two districts within the House of Delegates, with the western portion of the county falling in House District 62 and the eastern portion falling in House District 63.

=== State representation ===
Virginia House of Delegates
Office	Name	Party	District
Delegate	Karen Hamilton	Republican	62
Delegate	Phil Scott	Republican	63

Virginia State Senate
Office	Name	Party	District
Senator	Bryce Reeves	Republican	28

Since 1952, the county has leaned Republican in national elections. Republican congressmen have won every contest and averaged 67% of the vote. Republican presidential candidates have averaged 55% of the vote, and the last Democratic presidential nominee to carry Orange County was Harry S. Truman in 1948. Republican senatorial candidates typically garnered 56% of the county vote until the electorate swung in favor of Democratic candidates in 2008 and 2012 with an average of 57% of the vote, then back to Republican candidates in 2014 with 60% of the vote.

United States presidential election results for Orange County, Virginia
Year	Republican		Democratic		Third party(ies)	
Year	No.	%	No.	%	No.	%
1912	87	11.37%	619	80.92%	59	7.71%
1916	153	20.03%	608	79.58%	3	0.39%
1920	258	26.41%	718	73.49%	1	0.10%
1924	181	16.95%	834	78.09%	53	4.96%
1928	732	46.39%	846	53.61%	0	0.00%
1932	309	19.72%	1,253	79.96%	5	0.32%
1936	402	24.57%	1,227	75.00%	7	0.43%
1940	464	26.38%	1,283	72.94%	12	0.68%
1944	694	36.60%	1,199	63.24%	3	0.16%
1948	726	39.20%	856	46.22%	270	14.58%
1952	1,525	62.17%	916	37.34%	12	0.49%
1956	1,344	53.55%	794	31.63%	372	14.82%
1960	1,413	54.28%	1,108	42.57%	82	3.15%
1964	1,595	51.34%	1,508	48.54%	4	0.13%
1968	1,727	47.17%	879	24.01%	1,055	28.82%
1972	2,758	71.28%	1,032	26.67%	79	2.04%
1976	2,549	49.39%	2,309	44.74%	303	5.87%
1980	3,381	54.90%	2,420	39.30%	357	5.80%
1984	4,483	65.72%	2,285	33.50%	53	0.78%
1988	4,319	61.57%	2,592	36.95%	104	1.48%
1992	4,092	45.64%	3,348	37.34%	1,526	17.02%
1996	4,435	49.79%	3,590	40.30%	883	9.91%
2000	5,991	57.15%	4,126	39.36%	366	3.49%
2004	7,749	59.94%	5,015	38.79%	164	1.27%
2008	8,506	53.83%	7,107	44.98%	188	1.19%
2012	9,244	56.52%	6,870	42.01%	240	1.47%
2016	10,521	60.92%	5,957	34.49%	792	4.59%
2020	12,426	59.91%	7,995	38.54%	321	1.55%
2024	13,764	61.58%	8,274	37.02%	315	1.41%

=== Local ===
Locally, the county is represented by the five-person Orange County Board of Supervisors, each of whom is elected from their respective districts; there are no at-large members. Board members serve four-year staggered terms and appoint district representatives to the Planning Commission, Board of Zoning Appeals, and the Economic Development Authority, among others.

The following is the current list of supervisors and districts which they represent:

Position	Name	Affiliation	District
Chair	Bryan Nicol	Independent	Five
Vice-Chair	Ed Van Hoven	Republican	Two
Member	Jason Capelle	Independent	One
Member	Keith Marshall	Republican	Three
Member	Crystal Coleman	Independent	Four

The following is the current list of county wide constitutional officers:

Office	Name	Affiliation
Commonwealth's Attorney	Page Higginbotham III	Republican
Commissioner of the Revenue	Renee Lloyd Pope	Independent
Sheriff	Jason Smith	Independent
Treasurer	Dawn Herndon	Independent
Clerk of Circuit Court	Melissa Morris	Independent

Administratively, the county operates under a council-manager form of government. The board appoints the county administrator, who serves at its pleasure. Theodore (Ted) L. Voorhees served in this role from April 2020 to August 2025. Glenda Paul, the previous deputy county administrator, now serves in this role.

=== Taxation ===
The real estate tax rates as of Fiscal Year 2024 include 61 cents per $100 of assessed value for the General Fund and 14 cents per $100 of assessed value for the Fire and EMS Fund for a combined rate of 75 cents.

=== Crime ===
In November 2017, there was one registered sex offender living in Orange County.

On April 6, 2014, George Toombs, a 10-year-old boy, was shot and killed. The suspect in the case was scheduled to appear in court on murder charges on February 15, 2015. The boy's mother was also charged with felony child neglect.

While extremely rare in the county, a second fatal shooting occurred on June 29, 2014, in Gordonsville, resulting in the death of Clyde Johnson.

On April 12, 2012, 84-year-old James Weaver was bludgeoned to death in his home by a Louisa County man who used to do work around Weaver's home.

On September 10, 2010, 19-year-old Samantha Clarke disappeared from her Orange home. Her disappearance remains unsolved.

The Orange County Sheriff's Office maintained 36 sworn officers in 2012. The Town of Orange had 15 sworn officers and the Town of Gordonsville five.

In 2012, the incident rate for the county was 1.6%, for the town of Orange 6.1%, and the Town of Gordonsville 3.4%.

== Economy ==
Orange County businesses generated over $200 billion in taxable sales in 2012. The top five industries by taxable sales, as classified by the NAICS, were food and beverage stores, food services and drinking places, gasoline stations, general merchandise dealers, and motor vehicle and parts dealers. The top five industries by employment were local government, retail trade, manufacturing, accommodations and food services, and wholesale trade. In July, the top five private-sector employers were Dogwood Village, Macmillan Publishing Solutions, Battlefield Farms Inc., American Woodmark Corp. and Aerojet Rocketdyne. However, small businesses were the predominant employer type, with 65% of all Orange County businesses employing four or fewer workers.

Agriculture is an important part of the county's economy, of which nursery, greenhouse, floriculture and sod (NAICS category) represent the largest sector. Orange County is Virginia's top producer in this market sector. The equestrian and forestry industries are also large sectors within the agricultural economy of the county. In addition, tourism (particularly related to history, wine and agritourism) is a significant and growing portion of the economy.

Unemployment over the years has remained considerably below the United States average and slightly above that of Virginia. Recent studies show a 6% unemployment rate, which is the second highest rate in the region. The highest-paid industry in Orange County in 2012 was finance and insurance, followed by professional/scientific/technical services, educational services and transportation/warehousing. The highest-paid was accommodations/food services, followed by arts/entertainment/recreation, health care/social assistance and retail trade. The average weekly wage across all industries was $671.

=== Wine ===
Portions of Orange County lie within the Monticello Viticultural Area. Four wineries are located within the county: Barboursville Vineyards, Horton Vineyards, Chateau MerrillAnne and the Reynard Florence Vineyard. In 2012, Orange County contained 214 acres (868 short tons) worth of wine grape production, which was the third highest of all counties in the state. Tonnage of grapes produced and acreage devoted to production in the county has risen 60% and 72%, respectively, since 2004. This is representative of the growing wine industry in Virginia, which contributed a total of $747 billion to the state economy in 2010.

=== Development issues ===
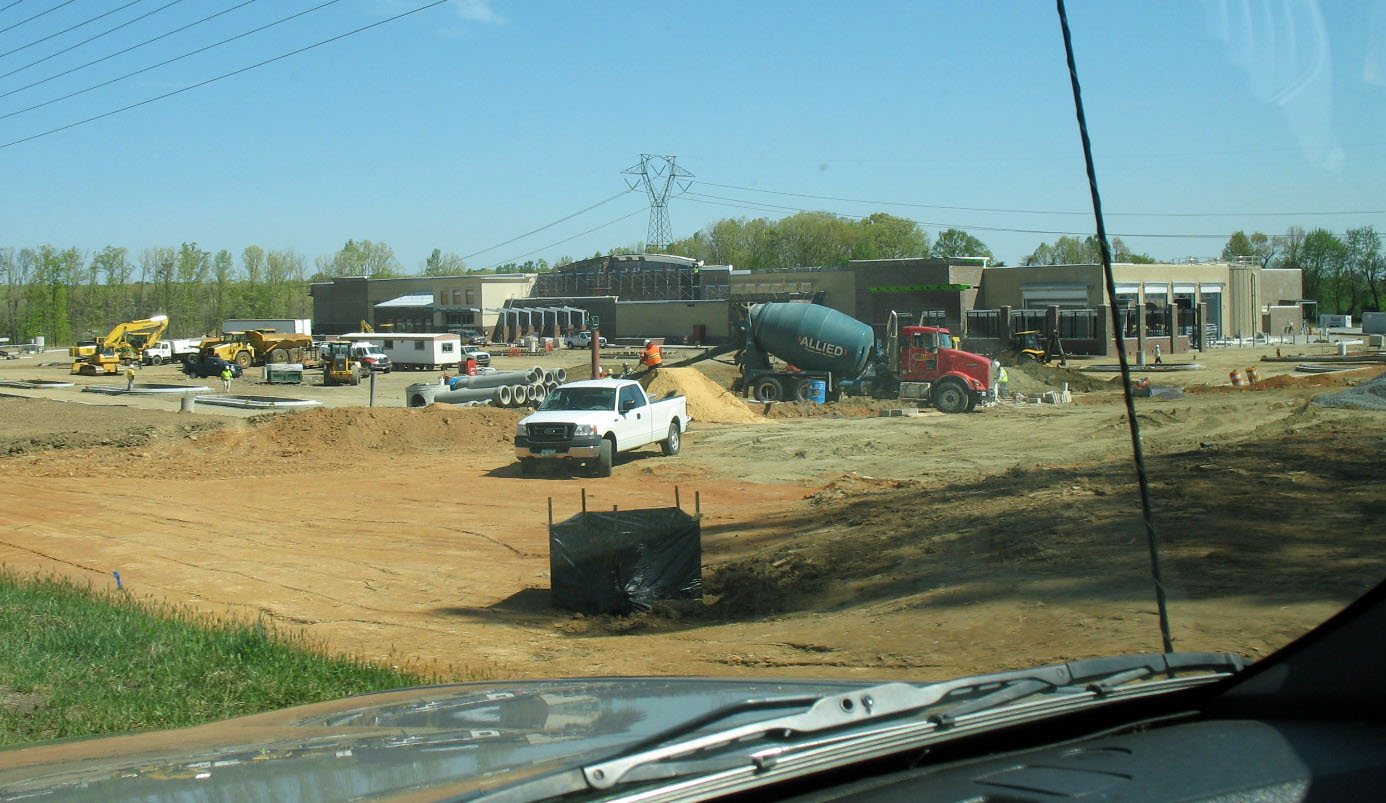
Locust Grove WalMart under construction

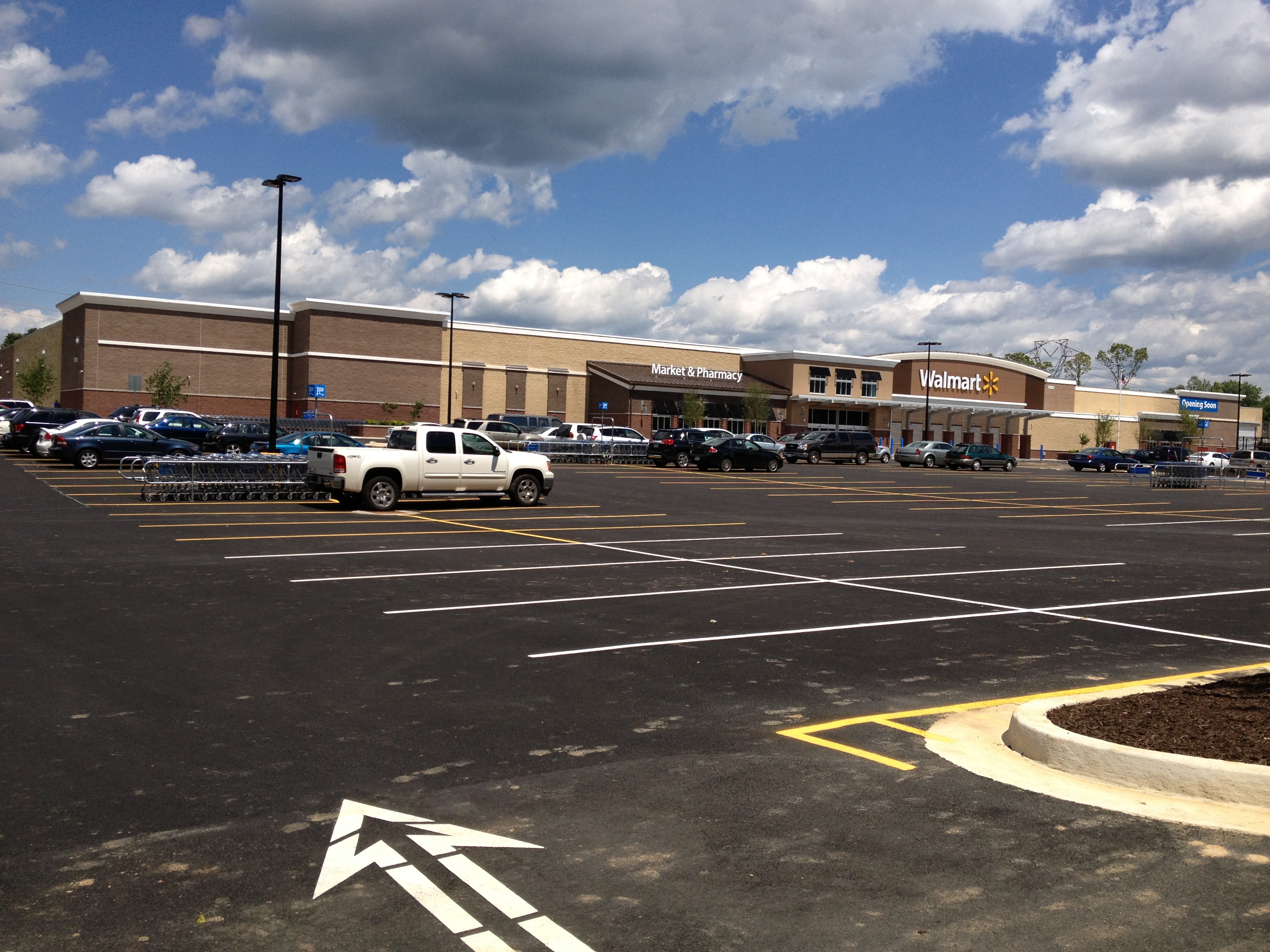
Locust Grove Walmart completed

In September 2008, Wal-Mart submitted an application for a special use permit to build a 141,000-square-foot (13,100 m^{2}) Supercenter store less than a quarter of a mile from the National Park Service boundary of the Wilderness Battlefield. It was to be situated on a 52-acre (210,000 m^{2}) tract just north of the Route 3/Route 20 intersection in eastern Orange County. The Orange County Board of Supervisors formally approved the application on August 25, 2009. On September 23, 2009, the National Trust for Historical Preservation, Friends of the Wilderness Battlefield and six nearby citizens filed suit against the Board of Supervisors claiming the store was likely to produce a significant increase in traffic and subsequent development, among other counts. The National Trust was dropped from the suit for lack of legal standing, and Wal-Mart, its chosen developer and the property owner were later named as additional defendants.

The lawsuit attracted national media attention, with the actor Robert Duvall and the filmmaker Ken Burns taking a formal stand against the project. On January 26, 2011, the morning before the trial was set to begin, Wal-Mart submitted a statement to the court abandoning its plans for the store. In that statement, the company also agreed to purchase the subject property without developing it, to reimburse Orange County for its legal and administrative expenses related to the lawsuit and to find another site elsewhere in the county. The lawsuit was formally dismissed on 12 May 2011.

Wal-Mart announced its selection on May 23, 2011, of a new site in the county, approximately 4 miles west of the original site, in the Germanna area of Locust Grove. Following approval of a new special use permit from the Board of Supervisors, the new store officially opened on July 10, 2013. The original plaintiffs in the lawsuit, along with other preservationist groups, expressed approval of Wal-Mart's new site and its decision to abandon the original plans. In August 2013, Wal-Mart dedicated 25 feet of right-of-way from the original site to the Commonwealth of Virginia and 70 feet of right-of-way to the county for future transportation improvements. In September 2013, Walmart deeded the remainder of the site (approximately 48 acres) to the Virginia Department of Historic Resources.

Subsequent to the selection of the new location, the county board of supervisors reduced the amount of tax revenue collected annually through the merchant's capital tax by 15% (11% in 2010, 2% in 2011 and 2% in 2012). This tax is determined by the value of inventory carried by a local business. In 2011, the county lost $599,690 in revenue provided by the federal government and, rather than adjust the annual budget or restore the merchants capital tax, the board approved a 16% personal property tax increase to raise an additional $666,141 of revenue for the county.

An October 2013 revision to the county's 2009 comprehensive plan was met with overwhelming opposition by local residents concerned that the plan's vision to "sustain the rural character of Orange County while enhancing and improving the quality of life for all its citizens" was not accurately reflected in the document's development-friendly wording. The plan was passed by the Board of Supervisors on December 17, 2013, by a vote of 3–1.

On February 21, 2013, members of the Orange County planning commission, voted to approve a re-zoning application in the Germanna area, and redesignate what had been an agricultural zone to a commercial and high-density residential area. Despite 90% of the local residents in attendance making a request for denial, the application was passed by J.P. Tucker III (owner of a construction company), Andy Hutchinson (owner of a sod company), and Donald Brooks (political candidate for sheriff).

In May 2013, the county board of supervisors passed a resolution to create the Route 3 Strategic Initiative; this resolution was based on a nine-year-old survey taken at the beginning of the 60% increase in population during the 2000s. Public comment was solicited in three half-hour sessions only after the board dinner break during three monthly board meetings. The initiative which affects Districts 4 and 5 was spearheaded by District 2 supervisor Jim White, and may further the conflict between developers and local residents wishing to keep the area rural in character.

On December 9, 2014, Orange County supervisors Lee Frame and James White, planning commission member P. Nigel Goodwin, and Economic Authority members William Hager and Winston Sides proposed a land use plan entitled the Germanna-Wilderness Area Plan (GWAP) after consulting with private sector developers, financial analysts, and engineers. This plan is a 50-year vision to develop a "place to live, work, and play with a higher standard of design and development which is a self-contained, complete community that is appealing to current and prospective residents." The document was adopted in 2015.

On July 9, 2018, the Orange County Board of Supervisors considered adding three new zoning districts to the Germanna-Wilderness Area Plan (GWAP). The vote was unanimous in approving these changes.

== Places of historical significance ==
In November 2013, Orange County had 34 sites listed on the National Register of Historic Places, including Barboursville, the Germanna Site, the Madison-Barbour Rural Historic District (the largest such district in Virginia) and the historic downtowns of both Orange and Gordonsville.

=== James Madison Museum ===
Part of the registered historic commercial district, the first museum in the United States to honor James Madison is housed in a late 1929 building formerly known as Powell Motor Company and Hilltop restaurant. The museum is dedicated to serving the community by collecting and preserving the artifacts and cultural heritage of 18th-, 19th-, and 20th-century rural Virginia, and promoting an awareness and appreciation of the lives and achievements of James Madison and others who made a unique contribution to the region. Exhibits include "presidential cousins" James Madison and Zachary Taylor, presidential artifacts, a Black History Room, pictorial gallery and a large Hall of Agriculture and Transportation.

The Wilderness Battlefield - Widow Tapp Field

=== Wilderness Battlefield ===
The Battle of the Wilderness was fought in Orange County on May 5–7, 1864. The battle was the first occasion that Generals Ulysses S. Grant and Robert E. Lee faced each other in the Civil War. The fighting at the Wilderness, while tactically inconclusive, was the first battle in Grant's Overland Campaign that ultimately led to the fall of Richmond and Lee's surrender at Appomattox.

Over 160,000 troops were engaged at the Wilderness in trench warfare and back-and-forth flanking attacks through the surrounding woodlands. When the guns fell silent on May 7, over 23,000 soldiers lay dead or wounded, with thousands more either captured or missing. Grant's Union army disengaged and continued southward to fight the Battle of Spotsylvania Court House and ultimately press on toward Richmond.

Today, the Battle of the Wilderness is a part of the Fredericksburg and Spotsylvania National Military Park, which has preserved 2,773 acres (11.22 km^{2}) of the original battlefield.

=== Ellwood Manor ===
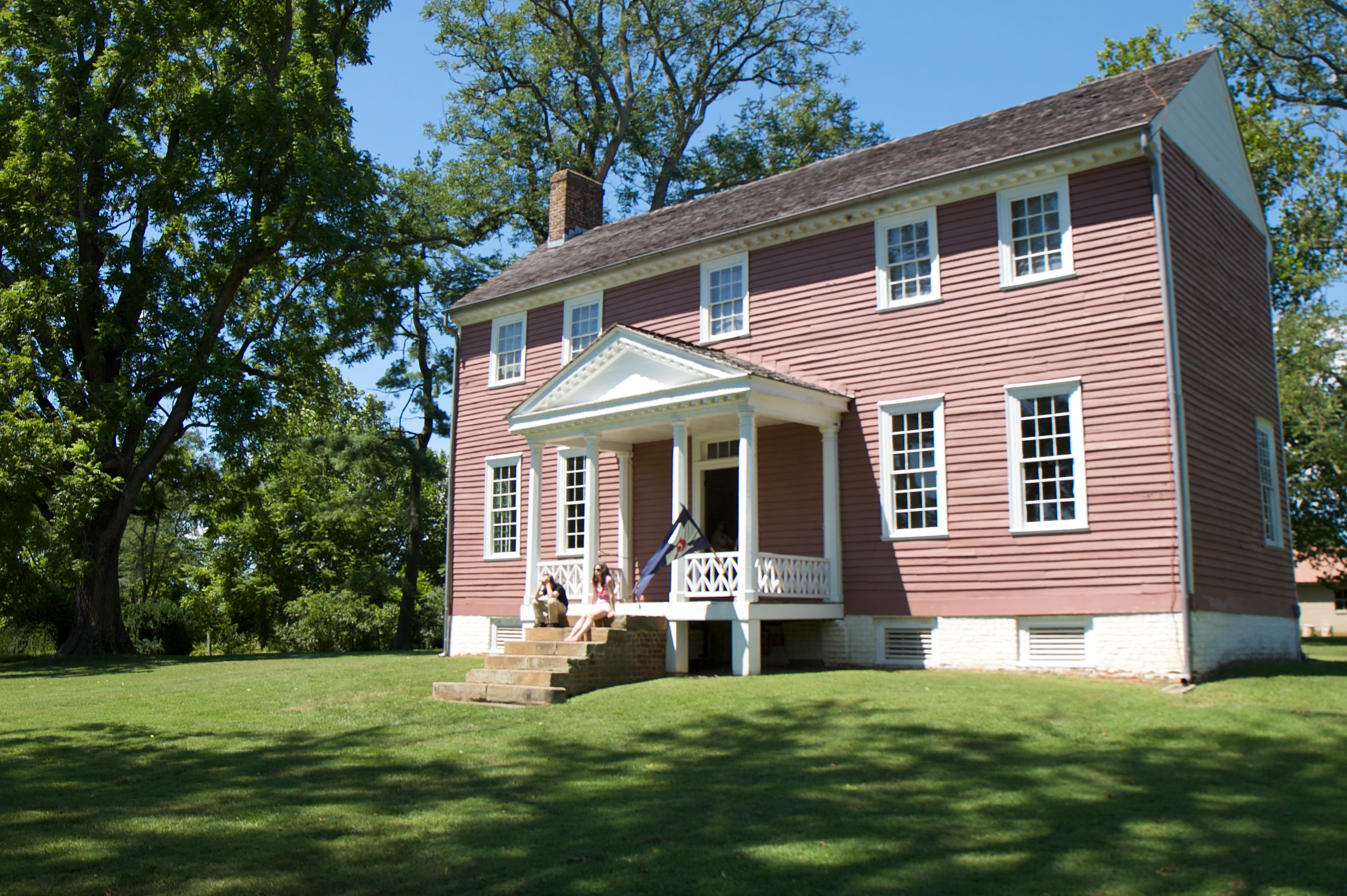
Ellwood Manor

Ellwood Manor is the only surviving house that was present at the time of the Battle of the Wilderness in May 1864. During the battle, Ellwood became a base of operations for the Union Army as Union General Grant made his headquarters nearby. Ellwood also played a role in the Battle of Chancellorsville in 1863 when Confederate General Stonewall Jackson, who was wounded during the battle, had his arm amputated and buried in the family cemetery at Ellwood. Following the battle at Chancellorsville, Ellwood was a Confederate hospital.

In 2008, Ellwood was named "Favorite Virginia Civil War Site" by the Rappahannock Electric Cooperative's Cooperative Living magazine.

=== Montpelier ===
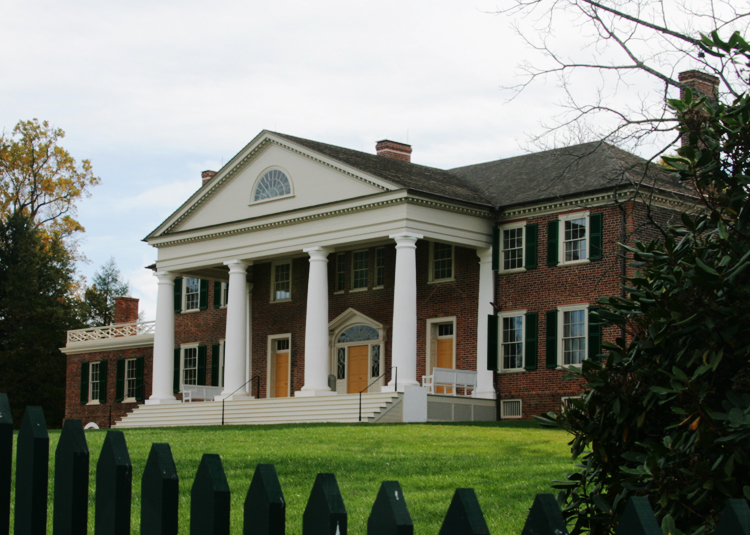
James Madison's Montpelier

Montpelier is the 2,700-acre plantation estate of James Madison, the 4th President of the United States and oft-hailed "Father of the Constitution." The original portion of the home was constructed around 1764 by Madison's father, James Madison Sr., with two major additions coming later in 1800 and 1812. The National Trust for Historic Preservation has owned the Montpelier estate since 1984. From 2003 to 2008 a $25 million renovation was performed on the property, returning both the home and grounds to their 1820 state as they were when occupied by James and his wife Dolley. Montpelier was designated a National Historic Landmark in 1960, and has been on the National Register of Historic Places since 1966. Both Madison and Dolley are buried in the family cemetery on the property.

=== The Exchange Hotel ===
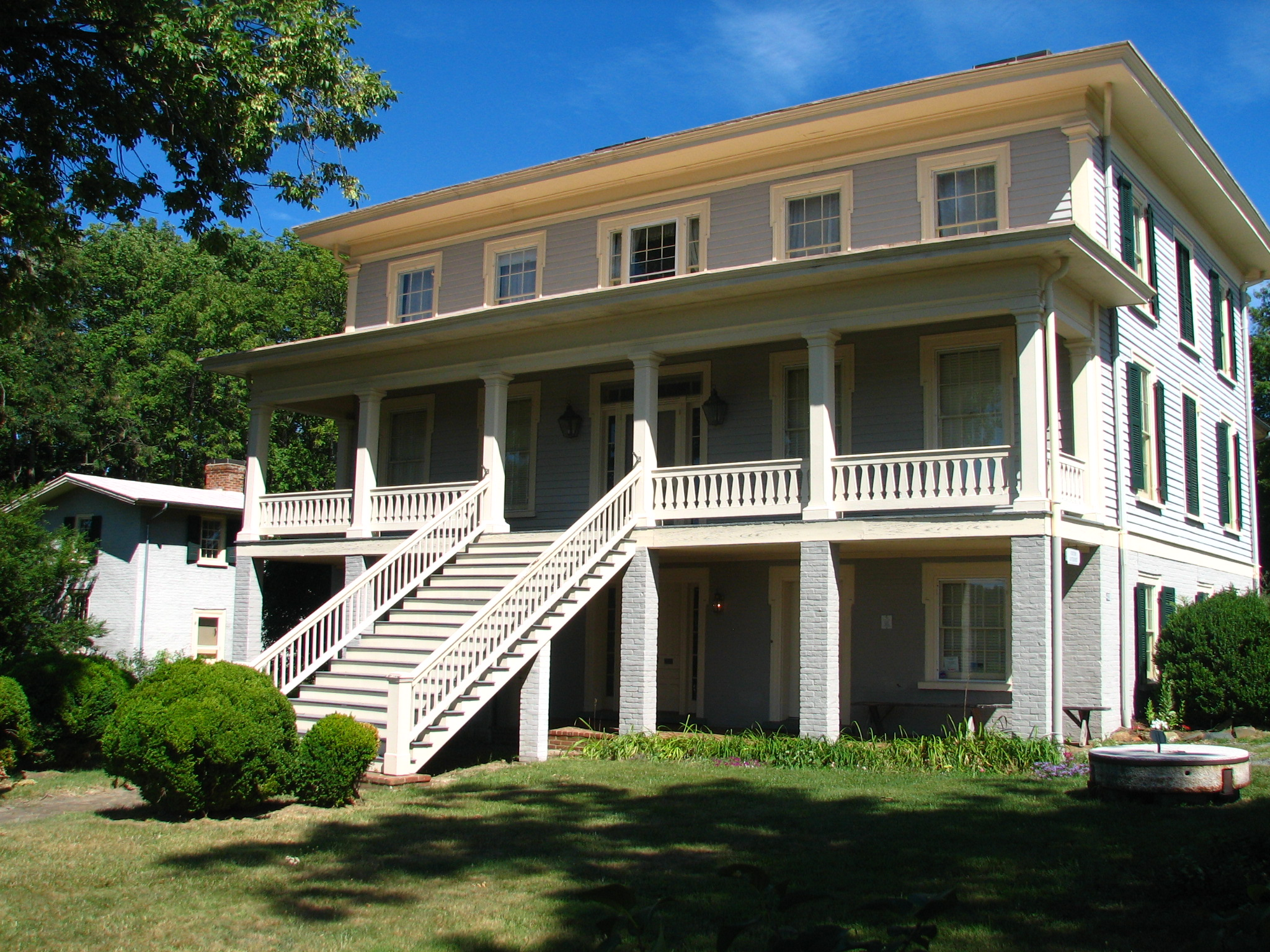
The Exchange Hotel

A well-preserved example of 19th-century Georgian architecture, the Exchange Hotel stands in the Town of Gordonsville as a living piece of Civil War history. Built in 1860 as a hotel on the Virginia Central Railroad, the building was soon transformed into the Gordonsville Receiving Hospital following the onset of the American Civil War. Because of its strategic location along a major railroad and proximity to nearby battlefields, the hospital treated over 70,000 wounded men by the end of the war. During Reconstruction, the hotel was known as the Freedman's Bureau Hospital which served newly freed slaves. The building eventually returned to its former use as a hotel, before being restored in 1971 and transformed into a museum. It is the only remaining Civil War era receiving hospital in Virginia.

Receiving hospitals during the Civil War functioned as triage centers, providing short-term medical care until doctors forwarded patients to other towns or medical facilities. These hospitals were normally located in large cities or on routes where patients were to change their mode of transportation and continue on to other destinations. Receiving hospitals, otherwise known as depot hospitals or clearing hospitals, were marked by short patient stays and a high turnover rate.

== Media ==
The county is served locally by the Orange County Review, a BH Media Group-owned weekly newspaper, and regionally by the Fredericksburg-based The Free Lance Star, Culpeper Star-Exponent and Charlottesville Daily Progress.

WVCV is licensed to Orange, and the county is also served by radio stations in the Fredericksburg and Charlottesville radio markets.

== Communities ==
=== Towns ===
- Gordonsville
- Orange

=== Census-designated place ===
- Barboursville
- Lake of the Woods

=== Unincorporated communities ===
- Burr Hill
- Eheart
- Lahore
- Locust Grove
- Montpelier Station
- Nasons
- Rapidan
- Rhoadesville
- Somerset
- Tibbstown
- Unionville

== Notable people ==
- James Barbour, 18th governor of Virginia, US senator, and United States Secretary of War
- Lewis R. Bradley, second governor of Nevada in the United States from 1871 to 1879; born in Orange County.
- Nannie Helen Burroughs, educator, orator, civil rights and religious leader, businesswoman
- Elijah Craig, Baptist minister who was arrested in Fredericksburg in the cause of religious freedom before the Revolution; later followed after brother Rev. Lewis Craig, leader of "The Travelling Church" to Kentucky in 1781
- Chris Haney, Major League Baseball pitcher
- Bradley Hanner, Major League Baseball pitcher
- Dwayne "The Rock" Johnson, actor and professional wrestler; maintains an estate in the county
- Patrick Kilpatrick, actor
- Edna Lewis, cookbook author and chef "whose cookbooks revived the nearly forgotten genre of refined Southern cooking"
- James Madison, 4th president of the United States and "father of the Constitution"
- Randolph Scott, western film actor
- James Taliaferro, former U.S. senator for Florida
- George Taylor, member of the Virginia House of Burgesses
- Zachary Taylor, 12th president of the United States

== See also ==
- National Register of Historic Places listings in Orange County, Virginia
- Orange Volunteer Fire Company
