= Exchange Hotel (Gordonsville, Virginia) =

- U.S. National Register of Historic Places
- U.S. Historic district – Contributing property
- Virginia Landmarks Register
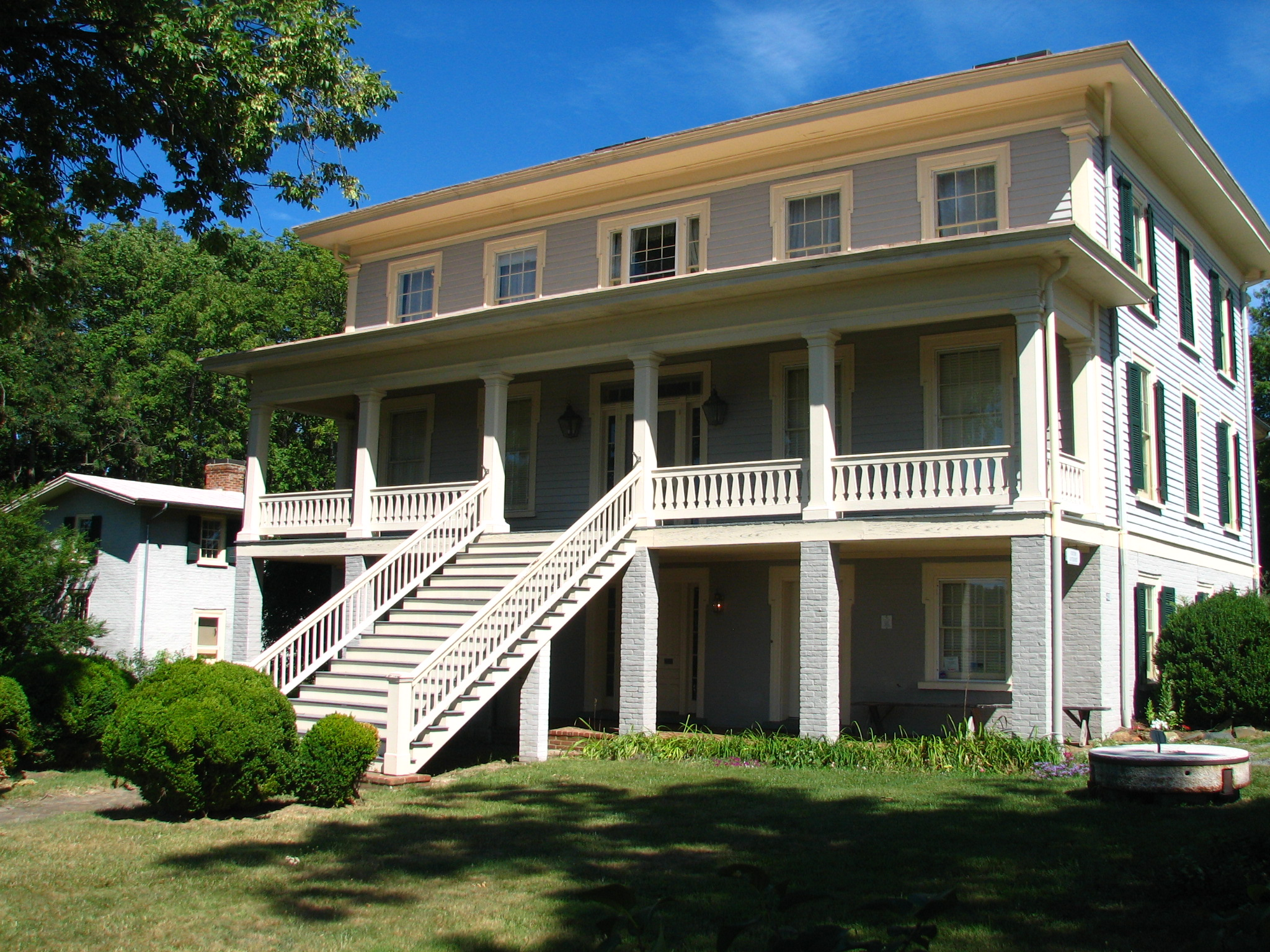
- Exchange Hotel, August 2008

- Location within Virginia Location within the United States
- Location: S. Main St., Gordonsville, Virginia
- Coordinates: 38°8′7″N 78°11′11″W
- Built: 1860
- Architect: Benjamin F. Faulconer
- Architectural style: Greek Revival
- NRHP reference No.: 73002046
- VLR No.: 225-0008

Significant dates
- Added to NRHP: August 14, 1973
- Designated VLR: July 17, 1973

The Exchange Hotel in Gordonsville, Virginia, was built in 1860 for Richard F. Omohundro next to an important railroad junction, when the Exchange Hotel offered a welcome stopping place for weary passengers on the Virginia Central Railroad.

== Civil War ==
In March 1862, because of its strategic location, the Exchange Hotel became part of the Gordonsville Receiving Hospital, admitting more than 23,000 sick and wounded in less than a year. The wounded and dying from nearby battlefields such as Cedar Mountain, Chancellorsville, Trevilian Station, Mine Run, Brandy Station, and the Wilderness were brought by the trainloads. Although this was primarily a Confederate facility, the hospital treated the wounded from both sides. Twenty-six Union soldiers died here. By war's end more than 70,000 men had been treated at the Gordonsville Receiving Hospital and just over 700 would be buried on its surrounding grounds. The scene of untold agony and death, the building survived the conflict.

== After the war ==
In the reconstruction period, this hospital served newly free people who were previously enslaved as a Freedman's Bureau Hospital. As the United States healed and the railroads boomed, this graceful building again became a hotel and enjoyed a fine reputation until the 1940s when it went into decline.

== Museum ==
Historic Gordonsville, Inc. acquired and restored the property in 1971. The museum contains many artifacts from the Civil War era, like medical artifacts, uniforms and firearms. The museum also houses a bookstore. It is located in the Gordonsville Historic District.
