= 1991 Virginia's 7th congressional district special election =

- November 5, 1991

Virginia's 7th congressional district
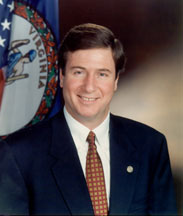

| Nominee | George Allen | Kay Slaughter |
| Party | Republican | Democratic |
| Popular vote | 106,745 | 59,655 |
| Percentage | 62.04% | 34.67% |
U.S. Representative before election
French Slaughter
Republican
Elected U.S. Representative
George Allen
Republican

The 1991 Virginia's 7th congressional district special election was held on November 5, 1991, to succeed Republican Congressman French Slaughter, who resigned from the House following ill health. State Delegate George Allen won the Republican nomination and faced Charlottesville City Councilwoman Kay Slaughter, the Congressman's first cousin and the Democratic nominee. Allen defeated Slaughter in a landslide, winning 62 percent of the vote to her 35 percent.

== Background ==
Congressman French Slaughter was first elected to Congress from Virginia's 7th congressional district in 1984, and won re-election in 1986, 1988, and 1990. On July 2, 1991, Slaughter announced that he would resign from Congress, effective November 5, 1991, following a series of strokes. Governor Douglas Wilder scheduled a special election for the date of Slaughter's resignation, and both political parties held conventions to select their nominees.

== Republican nomination ==
The Republican nominating convention was held in Charlottesville on August 25, 1991, at the Charlottesville Performing Arts Center.

Following Slaughter's announcement that he would resign, State Delegate George Allen and the Congressman's son, attorney French Slaughter III, announced that the would run in the Republican nominating convention. Slaughter endorsed his son as his successor, though Allen claimed that he had secured Slaughter's support for the seat in exchange for not running against him in 1984, which Slaughter denied. However, as the convention drew closer and Allen attracted more support from convention delegates, Slaughter dropped out of the race and endorsed Allen, allowing Allen to be nominated unanimously.

=== Nominated ===
- George Allen, member of the Virginia House of Delegates from the 58th district

=== Dropped out ===
- D. French Slaughter III, Charlottesville attorney, son of Congressman Slaughter

== Democratic nomination ==
The Democratic Party's nominating convention took place on September 7, 1991, at Culpeper County High School. In the lead-up to the convention, State Senator Edd Houck, whom Democrats considered their strongest candidate, opted not to run, and instead sought re-election to the legislature. Charlottesville City Councilwoman Kay Slaughter, the Congressman's first cousin, announced that she would run, and emerged as the frontrunner for the nomination when newspaper heiress Marie Ridder and David Smith, Slaughter's 1990 opponent, both declined to run.

At the nominating convention, Slaughter faced attorney Thomas Wilkinson Greene and public relations consultant T. Dean Reed, and won the nomination unopposed when Greene and Reed dropped out and moved to nominate Slaughter unanimously.

=== Nominated ===
- Kay Slaughter, Charlottesville City Councilwoman, first cousin of Congressman Slaughter

=== Dropped out ===
- Thomas Wilkinson Greene, Winchester attorney
- T. Dean Reed, public relations consultant

=== Declined ===
- Edd Houck, member of the Virginia Senate from the 17th district
- Marie Ridder, chairman of the Virginia Council on the Environment, Knight Ridder newspaper heiress
- David Smith, Winchester businessman and minister, 1990 Democratic nominee for Congress

== General election ==
=== Candidates ===
- George Allen (Republican)
- Kay Slaughter (Democratic)
- John A. Torrice, Jr. (independent)

=== Results ===
1991 Virginia's 7th congressional district special election
| Party | Candidate | Votes | % |
|---|---|---|---|
| Republican | George Allen | 106,745 | 62.04% |
| Democratic | Kay Slaughter | 59,655 | 34.67% |
| Independent | John A. Torrice, Jr. | 5,566 | 3.24% |
| Write-ins | | 89 | 0.05% |
| Total votes | | 172,055 | 100.00% |
| Republican hold | | | |
