= Rob Bell (Virginia politician) =

American politician (born 1967)

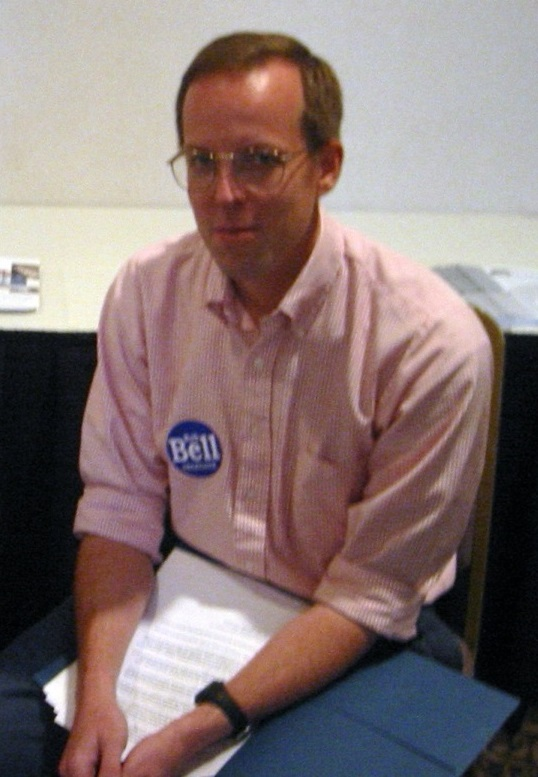

Member of the Virginia House of Delegates from the 58th district
- In office January 9, 2002 – September 18, 2023
- Preceded by: Paul Clinton Harris
- Succeeded by: Rodney Willett (redistricting)

Personal details
- Born: Robert Bernard Bell III; April 23, 1967 (age 59) Palo Alto, California, U.S.
- Party: Republican
- Spouse: Jessica Sweeney
- Education: University of Virginia (BA, JD)
- Website: Campaign website

Robert Bernard Bell III (born April 23, 1967) is an American politician. He was a Republican member of the Virginia House of Delegates from 2002 until 2023. In 2013, Bell ran unsuccessfully for the Republican nomination for Attorney General of Virginia. He resigned from his seat prior to his final term ending in 2023 to join Virginia Attorney General Jason Miyares's office.

== Early life and education ==
Bell was born in Palo Alto, California on April 23, 1967.

Bell worked as a convention volunteer and part-time intern for game company Iron Crown Enterprises (ICE) while attending classes at the University of Virginia, and began working for ICE full-time as an editor in 1988. Bell expanded and unified the Hero System from Hero Games, licensed by ICE. The fourth edition of the role-playing game Champions (1989) was mostly the work of Bell; aside from writing the book, he had also coordinated a volunteer effort involving dozens of gaming groups to provide input and feedback regarding the Hero System. Bell left ICE in 1990.

After attending the University of Virginia, Bell served as a state prosecutor in Orange County for five years. He later entered politics, occasionally continuing to take criminal defense matters.

== Virginia House of Delegates ==
=== Election ===
Bell was elected to the Virginia House of Delegates in November 2001, representing the 58th district in the Virginia Piedmont, including Greene County and parts of Albemarle, Fluvanna and Rockingham Counties. Bell's seat was previously held by Thomas Jefferson. On February 25, 2023 at the closing of the Virginia General Assembly Session, he announced that he would not seek re-election.

=== Abortion ===
In 2012, Bell voted in favor of a bill requiring all women to undergo a transvaginal ultrasound prior to having an abortion, except in cases of rape and incest, wherein police reports must be presented. While hundreds of people participated in a silent protest outside the Virginia state capitol, Bell, as the bill's patron, postponed a vote on the bill, which passed the next day. On March 1, 2012, Bell voted in favor of an amended version of the bill requiring women to undergo a transabdominal ultrasound prior to an abortion if written consent for a transvaginal ultrasound is not obtained, and no ultrasound at all if the physician deems it impossible to determine fetal age through the prescribed means. In 2020, Bell voted against the House Bill 552 on the definition of birth control "for the purposes of the regulation of medicine, as contraceptive methods that are approved by the U.S. Food and Drug Administration and provides that birth control shall not be considered abortion for the purposes of Title 18.2 (Crimes and Offenses Generally)."

=== Citizenship inquiries ===
During the 2012 legislative session, Bell was the primary sponsor of a bill requiring police to inquire into the citizenship of anyone arrested, regardless of criminal charges. The bill was widely criticized by civil rights organizations and failed to pass.

=== Education ===
In 2012 and 2013, Bell patroned the "Tebow Bill", named for Tim Tebow, which would allow homeschooled students meeting academic standards the opportunity to participate in public school sports teams and other extracurricular activities.

In 2020, Bell voted against HB-1355 which authorized the development of community schools where parents and children can receive aid from social services.

In 2021, Bell voted against HB-1980 that establishes scholarships and support for descendants of enslaved people to empower them out of the cycle of generational poverty.

=== Employment ===
In 2020, Bell voted against HB-984 that allows civil action against an employer that knowingly misclassified an employee often as an independent contractor to avoid properly paying for labor.

In 2020, Bell voted against HB-582 that authorizes local government employees to form unions and bargain collectively.

=== LGBT community ===
In 2020, Rob Bell voted against the HB-1663 which "prohibited discrimination; public accommodations, employment, credit, and housing: causes of action; sexual orientation and gender identity"

In 2020, Bell voted against HB-1041 that provided the opportunity for individuals to issue a new certificate to show a change of sex after their transition of their sex and verification from their healthcare provider to prove that the individual underwent the appropriate gender transition procedures.

In 2021, during a special session, Bell voted against HB-2132 which outlined that a person's sexual orientation and identity does not provide a proper defense to any charge of capital murder.

=== Public safety ===
As of 2013, Bell serves as the chairman of the Virginia State Crime Commission.

In 2006, Bell proposed legislation to bar violent sex offenders from school property, following public outrage over a convicted sex offender serving as a Santa Claus at an elementary school. In 2012, he proposed a bill expanding this ban to cover school buses and school-affiliated events.

In 2008, Bell proposed legislation to require school superintendents to screen job applicants for a history of child abuse convictions in Virginia and other states, as well as criminalize the misrepresentation of an applicant's offender status.

=== Property rights ===
Bell sponsored a legislatively referred constitutional amendment seeking to reform eminent domain in Virginia. The effort was initiated in part as a reaction to a 2005 US Supreme Court decision upholding the right of the government to seize property for economic development. The Virginia General Assembly approved the amendment in 2011, and then-Governor Bob McDonnell endorsed it. The proposed amendment was placed on the November 6, 2012, ballot as a statewide referendum, where it was approved.

== Attorney General campaigns ==
On December 6, 2011, Bell announced that he was a candidate for the 2013 Republican nomination for Attorney General of Virginia. State Senator Mark Obenshain won the nomination over Bell by a 55%–45% margin at a statewide convention in Richmond on May 18, 2013.

On December 3, 2015, Bell announced he would run again for the Republican nomination for Attorney General in the 2017 election, and vowed to oust incumbent Mark Herring, whom he cast as a liberal crusader with no regard for the law. However, on November 21, 2016, Bell abruptly announced that he was ending his campaign because his children, one of whom has special needs, were facing "new challenges" and stated, "Despite my best efforts, it has become clear to me that I can’t possibly fulfill my responsibilities as a father while making a statewide run." He announced that he would return donations made to his attorney general campaign, and would run for re-election to his House seat.

== Electoral history ==
Date	Election	Candidate	Party	Votes	%
Virginia House of Delegates, 58th district
Nov 6, 2001	General	Robert B. Bell III	Republican	13,627	59.95
Nov 6, 2001	General	Charles S. Martin	Democratic	9,088	39.98
Nov 6, 2001	General	Write Ins		17	0.07
Nov 6, 2001	General	Paul Clinton Harris retired; seat stayed Republican			
Nov 4, 2003	General	Robert B. Bell III	Republican	13,267	98.64
Nov 4, 2003	General	Write Ins		183	1.36
Nov 8, 2005	General	Robert B. Bell III	Republican	15,831	62.04
Nov 8, 2005	General	Stephen H. Koleszar	Democratic	9,676	37.92
Nov 8, 2005	General	Write Ins		11	0.04
Nov 6, 2007	General	Robert B. Bell III	Republican	16,220	98.30
Nov 6, 2007	General	Write Ins		280	1.69
Nov 3, 2009	General	Robert B. Bell III	Republican	18,402	67.24
Nov 3, 2009	General	Cynthia Neff	Democratic	8,948	32.69
Nov 3, 2009	General	Write Ins		16	0.05
Nov 8, 2011	General	Robert B. Bell III	Republican	17,227	98.20
Nov 8, 2011	General	Write Ins		315	1.79
Nov 5, 2013	General	Robert B. Bell III	Republican	20,191	95.78
Nov 5, 2013	General	Write Ins		890	4.22
Nov 3, 2015	General	Robert B. Bell III	Republican	13,926	96.44
Nov 3, 2015	General	Write Ins		514	3.56
Nov 7, 2017	General	Robert B. Bell III	Republican	18,652	61.20
Nov 7, 2017	General	Kellen Squire	Democratic	11,797	38.71
Nov 7, 2017	General	Write-Ins		27	0.08
Nov 7, 2019	General	Robert B. Bell III	Republican	18,217	62.47
Nov 7, 2019	General	Elizabeth A. Alcorn	Democratic	10,922	37.45
Nov 7, 2019	General	Write-Ins		22	0.08
Nov 2, 2021	General	Robert B. Bell III	Republican	25,835	63.21
Nov 2, 2021	General	Sara H. Ratcliffe	Democratic	14,999	36.70
Nov 2, 2021	General	Write-Ins		36	0.09
