= George Allen (American politician) =

American politician (born 1952)

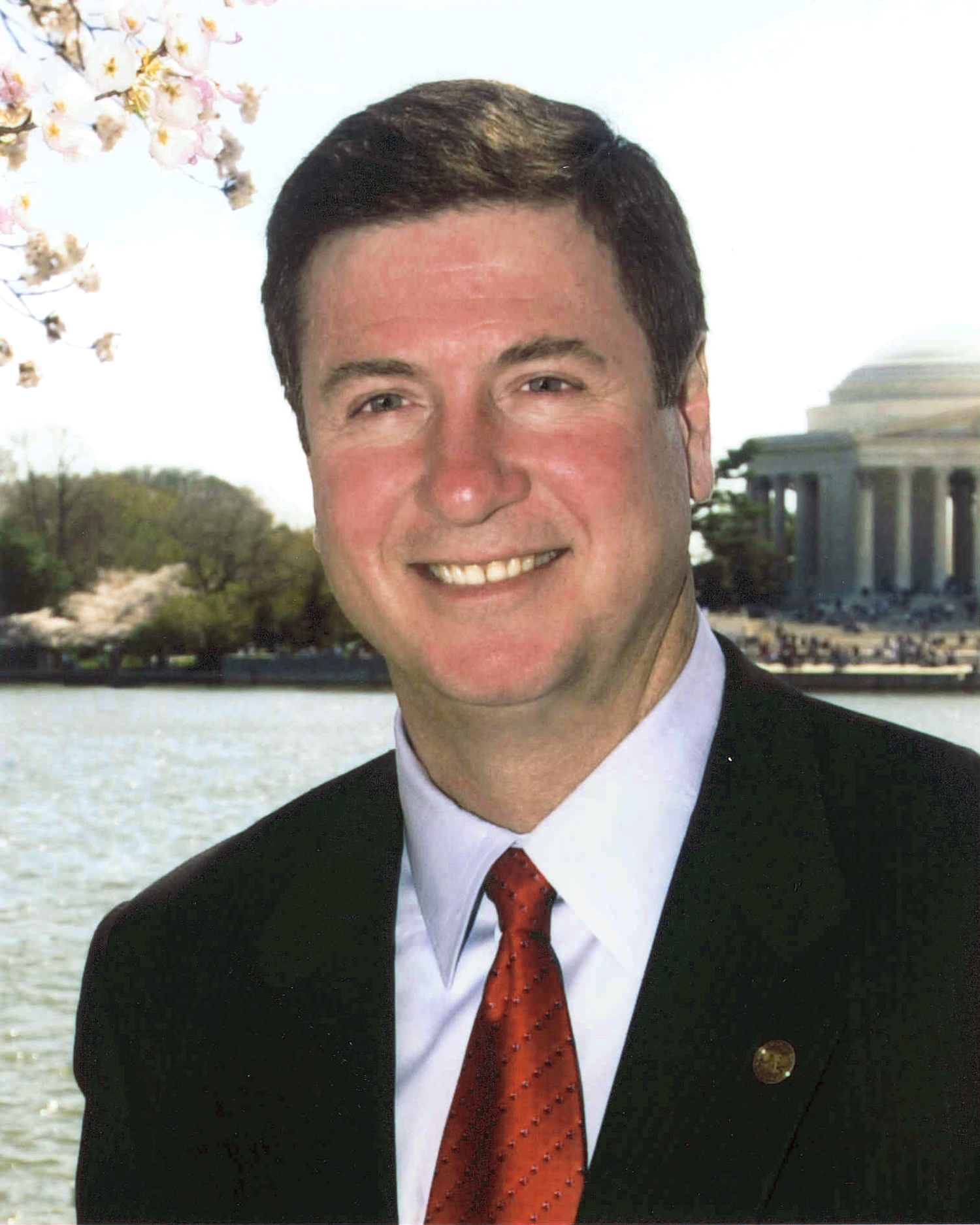
- Official portrait, c. 2002

United States Senator from Virginia
- In office January 3, 2001 – January 3, 2007
- Preceded by: Chuck Robb
- Succeeded by: Jim Webb

67th Governor of Virginia
- In office January 15, 1994 – January 17, 1998
- Lieutenant: Don Beyer
- Preceded by: Douglas Wilder
- Succeeded by: Jim Gilmore

Member of the U.S. House of Representatives from Virginia's 7th district
- In office November 5, 1991 – January 3, 1993 (Note: Allen's official service begins on the date of the special election, while he was not sworn in until November 12, 1991.)
- Preceded by: French Slaughter
- Succeeded by: Thomas Bliley

Member of the Virginia House of Delegates from the 58th district
- In office January 12, 1983 – November 5, 1991
- Preceded by: Constituency established
- Succeeded by: Peter T. Way

Personal details
- Born: George Felix Allen; March 8, 1952 (age 74) Whittier, California, U.S.
- Party: Republican
- Spouses: Anne Rubel (m. 1979; div. 1983); Susan Brown (m. 1986)
- Children: 3
- Education: University of California, Los Angeles (attended); University of Virginia (BA, JD)
- Allen's voice Allen supporting John Roberts's confirmation for Chief Justice of the United States. Recorded September 28, 2005

George Felix Allen (born March 8, 1952) is an American politician and lawyer who served as a United States senator from Virginia from 2001 to 2007. A member of the Republican Party, he previously served as the 67th governor of Virginia from 1994 to 1998.

The son of National Football League head coach George Allen, he served in the Virginia House of Delegates from 1983 to 1991, resigning after he won a special election for Virginia's 7th congressional district in November 1991. After his district was eliminated during redistricting, he declined to run for a full term in 1992, instead running for Governor of Virginia in the 1993 election. He defeated Democratic Attorney General of Virginia Mary Sue Terry by 58.3% against 40.9%.

Barred by term limits from seeking reelection to a second term in 1997, he worked in the private sector until the 2000 election in which he ran for the United States Senate, defeating two-term Democratic incumbent Chuck Robb. Allen ran for reelection in the 2006 election, but after a close and controversial race, he was defeated by Democratic former U.S. Secretary of the Navy Jim Webb. When Webb decided to retire, Allen ran for his old seat again in the 2012 election but was defeated again, this time by fellow former governor Tim Kaine. Allen now serves on the Reagan Ranch Board of Governors of Young America's Foundation, where he is a Reagan Ranch Presidential Scholar.

== Early life, education and early career (1952–1982) ==
Allen was born in Whittier, California on March 8, 1952. Allen's father, George Herbert Allen, was a National Football League (NFL) coach who was inducted into the Pro Football Hall of Fame in 2002. During the 2006 senatorial campaign, it was revealed that Allen's mother, Henrietta Lumbroso, was born to Sephardic Jewish parents in Tunisia. In a 2006 debate, Allen referred to his mother as being "French-Italian, with a little Spanish blood in her." He has a younger sister, Jennifer, an author and correspondent for NFL Network, and two brothers, including Bruce Allen, a former NFL team executive. He and his family lived there until 1957. They moved to the suburbs of Chicago after George Sr. was hired with the Chicago Bears. Then, the family moved back to Palos Verdes in Southern California after Allen's father was named head coach of the Los Angeles Rams in 1966.

Allen graduated in 1970 from Palos Verdes High School, where he was a member of the falconry club and the car club. He was also quarterback of the varsity football team. He then attended the University of California, Los Angeles, for a year. His father had in the meantime taken over the head coaching duties with the Washington Redskins in 1970 and the younger Allen transferred to the University of Virginia, in 1971, where he received a B.A. degree with distinction in history in 1974. He was class president in his fourth year at UVA, and played on the UVA football and rugby teams.

After graduating, Allen completed a Juris Doctor degree from the University of Virginia School of Law in 1977. In 1976, he was the chairman of the "Young Virginians for Ronald Reagan". Out of law school, he served as a law clerk for Judge Glen Morgan Williams of the United States District Court for the Western District of Virginia.

== Virginia House of Delegates (1982–1991) ==
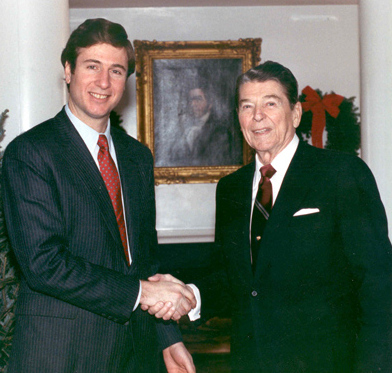
George Allen and President Ronald Reagan in the 1980s

=== Elections ===
Allen's first race for the Virginia House of Delegates was in 1979, two years after he graduated from law school. He ran in the 26th House District which was then composed of two seats. He placed third in a field of four candidates.

He ran again in 1982 for the House in the 58th House District and won the election, defeating incumbent Democrat James B. Murray, whose previous 24th House District was eliminated after redistricting, by 25 votes out of nearly 14,000 cast. He faced Murray again in a 1983 rematch, defeating him 53%–47%. He ran unopposed in 1985, 1987, and 1989. The seat he held was the same one held by Thomas Jefferson.

=== Tenure ===
He was a delegate from 1983 to 1991, representing parts of Albemarle and Nelson counties near Charlottesville.

Allen was a strong advocate for the death penalty, and actively supported expanding it in Virginia. For several years in a row, Allen introduced a bill that would add murder in commission of an attempted robbery to the list of capital crimes. Each year, the bill died in the House Courts of Justice Committee. Allen would continue to collect newspaper clippings for his file and followed every murder in the state.

Allen supported a statewide referendum on whether or not to create a state lottery system. In 1986, he proposed a referendum that would allow assets of illegal drug dealers to go to law enforcement.

=== Committee assignments ===
- House Courts of Justice Committee
- House General Laws Committee
- House Health Welfare and Institutions Committee
- House Militia and Police Committee
- House Mining and Mineral Resources Committee

=== Caucus memberships ===
- Regional Party Whip
- House Legislative Caucus

== U.S. House of Representatives (1991–1993) ==
=== Elections ===
==== 1991 ====
Incumbent Republican U.S. Representative French Slaughter, who represented the 7th congressional district, decided to resign because of a series of strokes. Allen faced Slaughter's cousin, Kay Slaughter, who was also a Charlottesville City Councilor. Allen defeated her 62% to 35%.

==== 1992 ====
In the 1990s round of redistricting, Allen's district, which stretched from the fringes of the Washington suburbs through the outer portions of the Shenandoah Valley to Charlottesville, was eliminated, even though Virginia gained an 11th district as a result of the 1990 U.S. census. The Justice Department had mandated Virginia create a new black-majority district in accordance with the Voting Rights Act. The Democratic-controlled legislature decided to dismantle the 7th and split it between three neighboring districts.

Allen's home in Earlysville, near Charlottesville, was placed in the 5th district, represented by Lewis F. Payne Jr. However, the largest slice of his old district was placed in the newly redrawn 10th district, represented by fellow Republican Frank Wolf. Allen moved to Mount Vernon and prepared to challenge Wolf in a primary. However, state Republican leaders had let it be known that he could not expect any support for his planned run for the governorship in 1993 if he made such a challenge. Allen decided not to run in either district. After Democratic U.S. Representative James Olin of the 6th district decided to retire, there was speculation Allen could run there. He decided not to move his family and run in the 6th district either.

=== Committee assignments ===
- United States House Committee on Small Business
- United States House Committee on Science
- United States House Committee on the Judiciary

== Governor of Virginia (1994–1998) ==
=== Elections ===
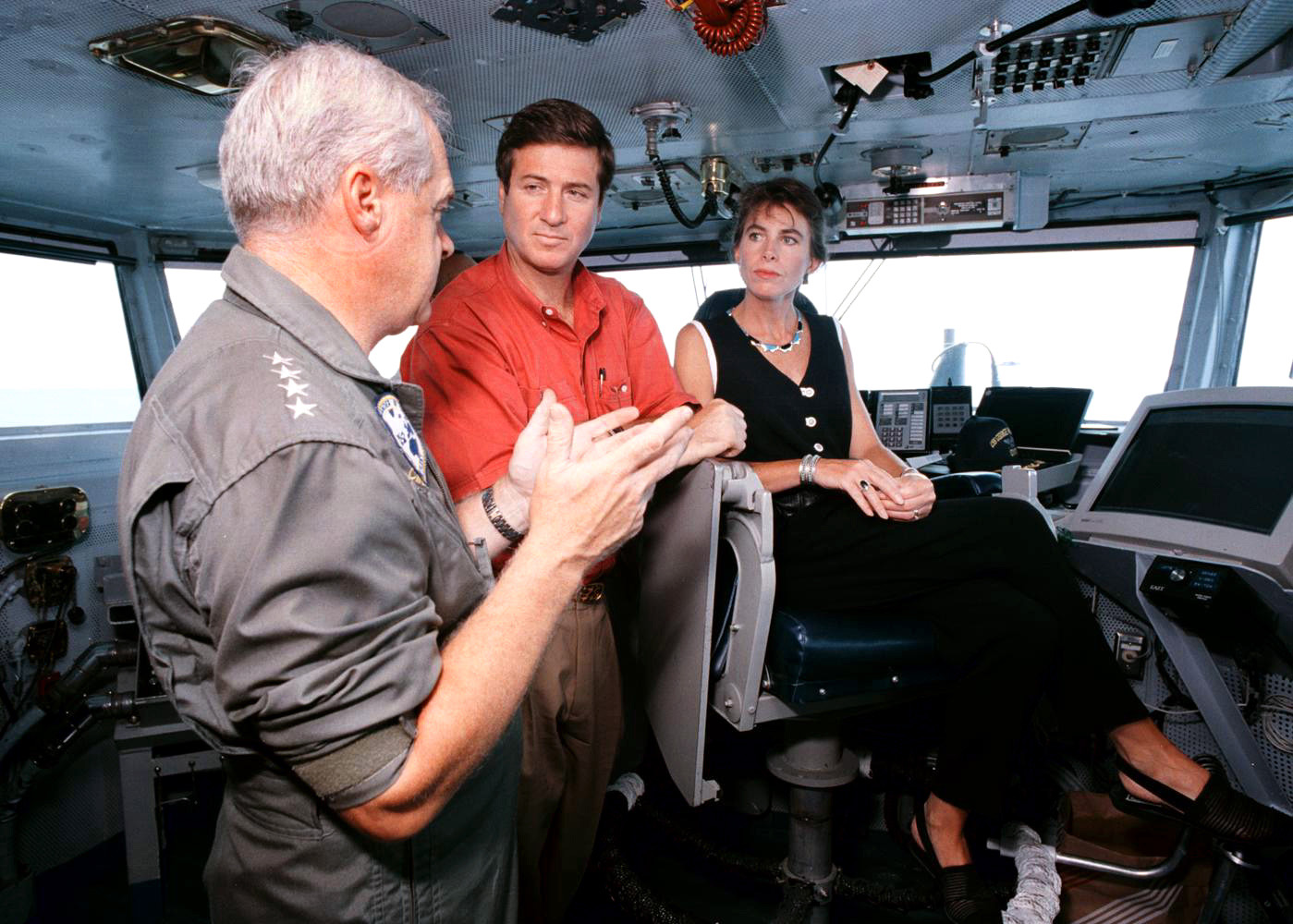
Governor Allen visiting the USS George Washington in July 1996.

In 1993, Allen was elected the 67th Governor of Virginia, serving from 1994 to 1998. His opponent in the 1993 election, Attorney General Mary Sue Terry, had an early 29-point lead in public opinion polls and a million-dollar fundraising advantage; his other opponent was Independent Nancy B. Spannaus. However, Allen's campaign proposal to abolish parole may have resonated during a surge of crime in the state. More importantly, he was running at the start of what would become the 1994 Republican Revolution. Allen overcame the deficit and won with 58.3% of the vote, the largest margin (+17.4 points) since Albertis S. Harrison Jr. defeated H. Clyde Pearson with a margin of +27.7 points in 1961.

Allen could not run for re-election because Virginia's constitution does not allow a governor to succeed himself; Virginia is the only state that has such a provision.

=== Welfare reform ===
During his 1993 campaign for governor, Allen vowed to reform Virginia's welfare system, stating that "Our obligation as a society is to provide a hand up to those in need, rather than a handout ... Welfare is not to be a permanent status for anyone in life." At the time welfare caseloads climbed 36 percent from 1988 while one out of twelve Virginians were receiving food stamps. In March 1995, after an overwhelmingly bipartisan vote of support, Allen signed his welfare reform bill propelling Virginia ahead of the national welfare reform effort, Among the key provisions outlined in the bill, the Virginia Initiative for Employment Not Welfare (VIEW) limited Temporary Assistance to Needy Families (TANF) benefits for welfare recipients to two years while recipients are required to work within ninety days of receiving benefits. Following VIEW's implementation, welfare caseloads decreased 33 percent, from 73,926 families in March 1995 to 49,609 families in July 1997. In areas where VIEW existed for twelve months, 74 percent were employed versus only 31 percent nationally,. According to the Virginia Department of Health and Human Resource's 1996 annual report, VIEW saved taxpayers 24 million dollar in its first year of existence; with an addition to federal welfare money, the savings total over the following two years comes to just over $70 million

The Allen Administration's welfare reform law also addressed concerns over single-parent recipients of welfare requiring mothers to name the child's father and provide three additional pieces of information to help locate the non-custodial parent or face loss of all TANF benefits. Since 1995, Virginia has achieved a 98.5 percent rate of paternity identification, the highest in the country. By removing the incentive to break up families, the Allen welfare reform allowed two parent households the same time to receive benefits as single parents. Because this law reversed the incentive of being a single parent TANF cases represented by two parent households increased by over 180 percent.

=== Truth-in-sentencing ===
In November 1993, Allen's campaign promise to abolish parole for those convicted of a felony helped drive him to a landslide victory after trailing from a 33 percent point deficit in the polls to Democrat Mary Sue Terry,

Truth-in-sentencing (TIS) and abolition of parole were ultimately passed in a Special Session of the General Assembly with the House voting 89–7 and the Senate voting 34–4 in favor of the measure. On January 1, 1995, Allen's central campaign promise became a reality when TIS and abolition of parole went into effect. According to the law, prison sentences increased for offenders without prior convictions for violent crimes by 125 percent, 300 percent for those with a prior felony conviction that originally had a maximum penalty of less than 40 years, and 500 percent for those with a felony conviction of a violent crime that originally had a minimum penalty of more than 40 years. Between 1994 and 1995, statistics show on average that first-degree murderers with violent records went from serving 15 years to 46 years.

In 1993, nearly half of all offenders released from prison were re-arrested for a new crime within 3 years. TIS ensured that inmates serve a minimum of 85 percent of their sentence. As a result of TIS, first degree murderers went from serving 29 percent of imposed sentence to 91 percent,. While parole was eliminated for those convicted of a felony after January 1, 1995, parole remained in effect for individuals incarcerated prior to TIS reform resulting in a rapid decline in the parole grant rate from 46 percent in 1991 to 5 percent in 1998.

=== Standards of learning ===
In June 1995, the Virginia Board of Education adopted Governor Allen's Commission on Champion Schools recommendation for statewide standardized tests for academic accountability. The Board of Education voted in favor of implementing the Standards of Learning (SOLs) which measures student achievements and ensures accountability for schools in the core subjects of English, mathematics, history, economics, and science. The commission also recommended the creation of an annual 'report card' to grade each public school's performance stating that: "If Virginia's youngsters can't make the grade, then neither should their schools" (2)(9). Experts suggested that in order to improve the quality of learning, a school should emphasize academic goals and effective leadership. By using measurement through tests, the state, teachers, and parents can monitor the effectiveness of schools teaching the basic fundamental subjects (1). Allen's legislation used public data of SOLs test scores along with school attendance and drop-out rates to ensure that unsatisfactory schools are accountable by the threat of state takeover through court action.

Initially, Allen succeeded in keeping Virginia's educational reform independent from federal funding by using a line-item veto in the state's budget, a power granted to Virginia governors. Allen argued that federal funding would force the Commonwealth to adhere to federal regulation, therefore, restricting the freedom of Virginia to craft its own high academic standards education plan. Despite Allen's efforts to keep Virginia independent from federal education funds, the Virginia Board of Education applied for federal funds through the program Goals 2000.

During Allen's tenure as governor, the American Federation of Teachers rated the SOLs "exemplary" in the four core subjects.

=== Virginia water toxin cover-up ===
In 1994, Allen's administration eliminated Virginia's water toxins monitoring program. The Virginia Toxics Database, which was maintained by the program and contained important baseline toxicity levels for Virginia waters, was locked away in a safe during Allen's term as governor. Scientists and government agencies were denied access to the data by Allen's Department of Environment Quality. Reporting by The Roanoke Times spurred Virginia legislators to call for an investigation by the Joint Legislative Audit and Review Commission. The 1999 investigation found that documents from the database were destroyed and that the concealed data included information on high levels of PCBs in Virginia waterways, including the Rappahannock River. A report by the Chesapeake Bay Foundation found that the DEQ had withheld knowledge of high mercury concentrations in the Shenandoah River.

=== "Disney's America" Controversy ===
In 1993, The Walt Disney Company announced their plans to build a U.S. history-inspired theme park called "Disney's America" in Prince William County, Virginia. Allen was a vocal supporter of the park, citing all the new jobs that would be created if the park was constructed. The announcement of the park, however, sparked backlash from both historians and the public. Many also worried the nearby Manassas National Battlefield Park—the site of two major Civil War battles (First Battle of Bull Run and the Second Battle of Bull Run)—would be negatively impacted by the park's creation. Allen went on CNN to debate critics of the project and spoke at a Congressional hearing over the park's creation. In the end, however, plans for the park's creation were scrapped by Disney.

== Return to the private sector (1998–2001) ==
=== McGuireWoods ===
In February 1998, Allen became a Richmond-based partner at the law firm McGuire Woods Battle & Boothe (now McGuireWoods LLP), as head of its business expansion and relocation team. At the time, Allen said "I think it's healthy to get out of government. If you stay in too long, you lose track of reality and the real world." According to a disclosure form Allen filed on May 12, 2000, he was paid $450,000 by the firm between January 1999 and April 2000.

=== Xybernaut ===
While out of office, Allen became a director at two Virginia high-tech companies and advised a third, all government contractors that he had assisted while governor.

In mid-1998, Allen joined the board of Xybernaut, a company selling mobile, flip-screen computers. The firm never made a profit – it posted 33 consecutive quarterly losses after it went public in 1996. In September 1999, Allen and the rest of the company's board dismissed the company's accounting firm, PricewaterhouseCoopers, which had issued a report with a "going concern" paragraph that questioned the company's financial health.

Allen made almost no money from the stock, according to his communications director, John Reid. According to the Associated Press, Allen steered compensation from his board service, other than stock options, to his law firm. He was granted options worth $1.5 million at their peak. Allen listed them on his disclosure forms for 2002 and 2003, but never exercised them.

=== Commonwealth Biotechnologies ===
Allen joined Commonwealth's board of directors about two months after leaving the governor's office in January 1998. "I learned a lot on their board and enjoyed working with 'em, and they seem to be doing all right, I guess," Allen said in October 2006.

Commonwealth granted Allen options on 15,000 shares of stock at $7.50 a share in May 1999. Allen steered other compensation from his board service to his law firm, McGuire Woods. As of late 2006, Allen had not cashed in any options; the stock price as of that date was well under $5 per share, making the options worthless. Commonwealth reported its first full year of profitability in 2005.

=== Com-Net Ericsson ===
Allen became a member of the advisory board of Com-Net Ericsson in February 2000. The advisory board's responsibility was to meet at least twice a year and provide advice and service. Allen terminated his service on the board before the end of 2000. He was paid approximately $300,000 for his services.

== U.S. Senate (2001–2007) ==
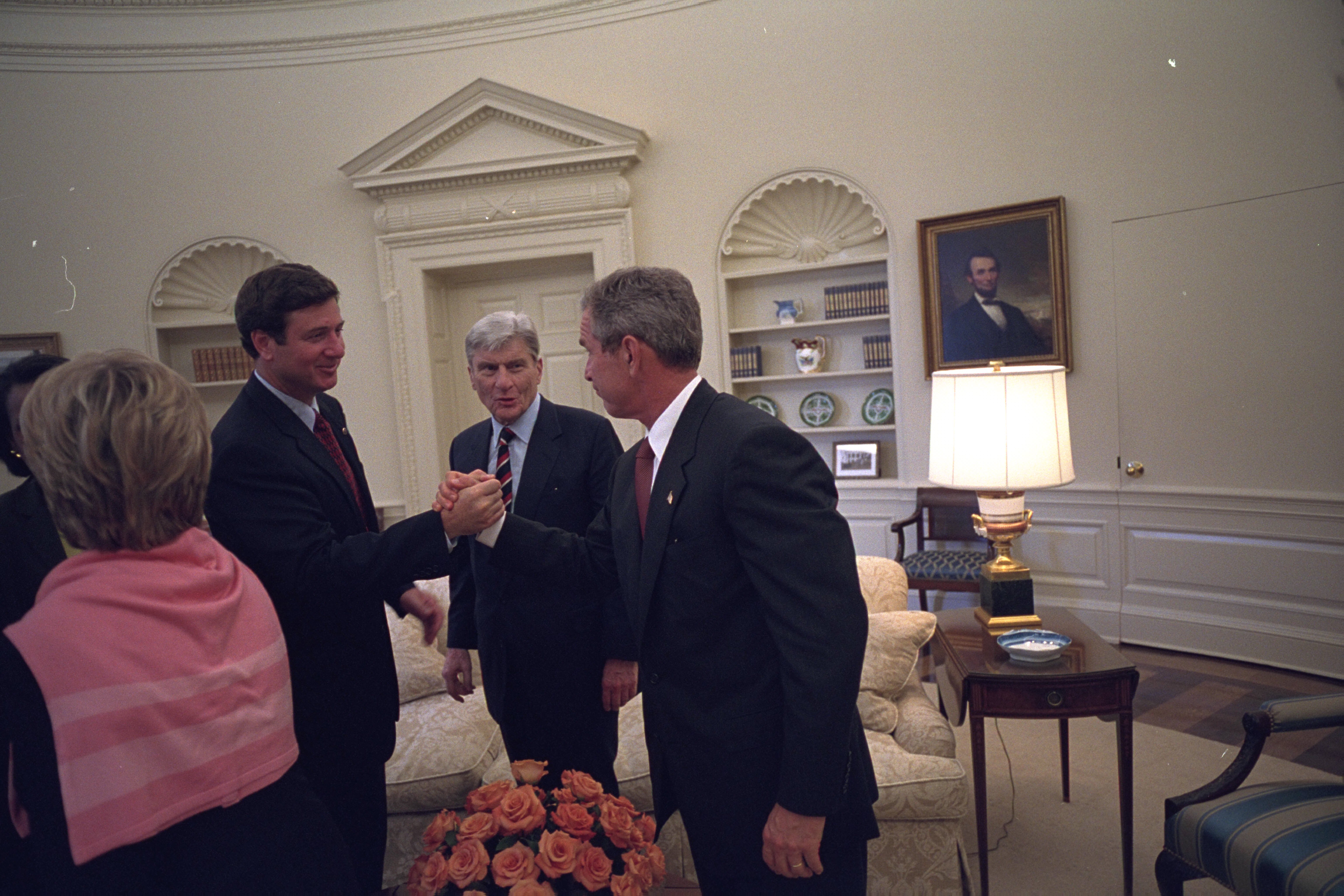
Allen shakes hands with President George W. Bush in the Oval Office, September 2001

=== Elections ===
==== 2000 ====
Allen ran for the U.S. Senate and defeated Democratic incumbent Senator Chuck Robb 52% to 48%. He was the only Republican to unseat a Democratic incumbent that year.

==== 2006 ====
Allen sought re-election in 2006, winning the Republican nomination on August 11, 2006. The general election featured three candidates: Allen; the Democratic Party nominee, former Secretary of the Navy James H. Webb; and Gail Parker, a retired Air Force officer and retired civilian Pentagon budget analyst who ran on the Independent Green Party ballot line. Allen ran a campaign that appealed to cultural, hard right-wing conservatives. During the campaign the Marshall-Newman Amendment was also on the ballot.

On August 11, 2006, at a campaign stop in Breaks, Virginia, near the Kentucky border, Allen twice used the racist slur "macaca" (meaning 'monkey') to refer to the dark-complexioned S. R. Sidarth, who was filming the event as a "tracker" for the opposing Jim Webb campaign. In what was dubbed as his "Macaca moment", Allen said:

"This fellow here over here with the yellow shirt, Macaca, or whatever his name is. He's with my opponent... Let's give a welcome to Macaca, here. Welcome to America and the real world of Virginia."

Sidarth, who is of Indian ancestry, was born and raised in Fairfax County, Virginia. The remarks quickly went viral and became a major news item on all of the network and cable television news shows.

Webb won by approximately a third of a percent – 9,329 votes. Two days after the election, on November 9, 2006, Allen held a press conference announcing that he had conceded the race to Webb and would not seek a recount. His defeat was widely attributed to the remarks made by him on the trail.

=== Tenure ===
The bills that Allen introduced or authored in the Senate include:

- Introduced a constitutional amendment to balance the budget
- Introduced a constitutional amendment to establish a line item veto
- Introduced paycheck penalty legislation, which withholds salaries from Congress until a budget is passed by beginning of the fiscal year
- Introduced the National Innovation Act, to promote growth of American science and engineering by grants, scholarships and training
- Introduced the Long-Term Care Act, which would allow people to use their 401(k) accounts to pay for long-term care insurance
- Introduced the Flexibility for Champion Schools Act, which would allow states with higher education standards to lower their standards to match federal standards
- Co-authored the Internet Tax Nondiscrimination Act, which extends the ban on various Internet taxes until 2007

21st century Nanotechnology Research & Development Act

In 2002, Allen co-sponsored, together with Senators Ron Wyden and Joe Lieberman, bipartisan legislation that promoted nanotechnology research and development in the United States. The 21st century Nanotechnology Research & Development Act was signed into law by President Bush on December 3, 2003.

The Act launched the National Nanotechnology Program to establish goals, priorities, and metrics for evaluation of federal nanotechnology research and development, investment in federal nanotech research and development programs, and provide for interagency coordination of federal nanotechnology activities. The National Nanotechnology Program, the single largest federally funded, multi-agency scientific research initiative since the space program in the 1960s, received $3.63 billion of funding over four years.

Allen was the founding Chair of the Congressional Nanotechnology Caucus. In 2009, he joined the board of the company Nano Risk Assessment, Inc.

=== Committee assignments ===
Allen was a member of the Commerce, Science, and Transportation Committee, the Small Business and Entrepreneurship Committee, the Foreign Relations Committee and the Energy and Natural Resources Committee.

Allen was appointed in the last Congress to serve as the chairman of the High Tech Task Force. Allen was elected as a member of the Senate Republican leadership as Chairman of the National Republican Senatorial Committee in 2002; he oversaw a net gain of four seats for the Republicans in the 2004 Senate elections. His successor as NRSC chair was Senator Elizabeth Dole. Dole was chairman of the NRSC in 2006, when Allen was defeated for re-election by Jim Webb.

== Post-Senate career (2007–present) ==
=== Political ambitions ===
==== 2008 presidential election ====
Prior to his loss to Webb in the November 2006 senatorial election, Allen had traveled a number of times to Iowa (the first state with a presidential caucus) and New Hampshire (the first state with a presidential primary). He had been widely assumed to be preparing a run for president.

In a survey of 175 Washington insiders by National Journal, released in April 2005, Allen was the frontrunner for the Republican nomination for the 2008 presidential election. In an insider survey by National Journal a year later, in May 2006, Allen had dropped to second place, and John McCain held a 3-to-1 lead over Allen.

After the November 2006 election, it was widely assumed that Allen was no longer a viable candidate for the Republican nomination, principally because of the damage caused by the incidents that caused his double-digit lead in the polls to turn to a narrow defeat that contributed to the Republicans' loss of control of the Senate.

On December 10, 2006, Allen gave an interview in which he stated that he would not seek the 2008 nomination.

In October 2007, the campaign of GOP presidential candidate Fred Thompson announced that Allen was one of three national co-chairs for the 2008 presidential campaign. That month, Allen declined to speculate on his political future.

==== 2009 gubernatorial election ====
Commenting on the 2009 governor's race in Virginia, Allen not only said that he had made no decisions but that "Susan and I have listened to a lot of people encouraging us to do that." On January 8, 2008, Allen said that he would not run for governor in 2009, but later left open the possibility of challenging Democratic senator Webb in 2012.

=== Political activism ===
In March 2007, Allen became a Reagan Scholar with Young America's Foundation. He is also the President of George Allen Strategies, a lobbying and consulting firm based in Alexandria, Virginia, a position he had held since July 2007. Between January 2010 and August 2011, he was paid $347,000 by the firm.

In 2009, Allen started the American Energy Freedom Center, a non-profit conservative think tank that is a project of the Institute for Energy Research. He was paid $20,000 to be the center's chairman in 2010; he ceased his affiliation with the organization in December of that year.

In May 2010, Regnery Press published Allen's first book, What Washington Can Learn From the World of Sports, in which he drew parallels and contrasts between two of the nation's favorite passions. Allen suggested that government needed to look no further than the football field, baseball diamond, or basketball court to solve today's pressing problems because, in sports, teamwork is essential, cheating is frowned upon, and the rules do not change.

In September 2024, Allen was one of several former governors to sign an open letter to all 50 current governors urging them to certify their states’ votes after the upcoming November election.

=== 2012 U.S. Senate election ===
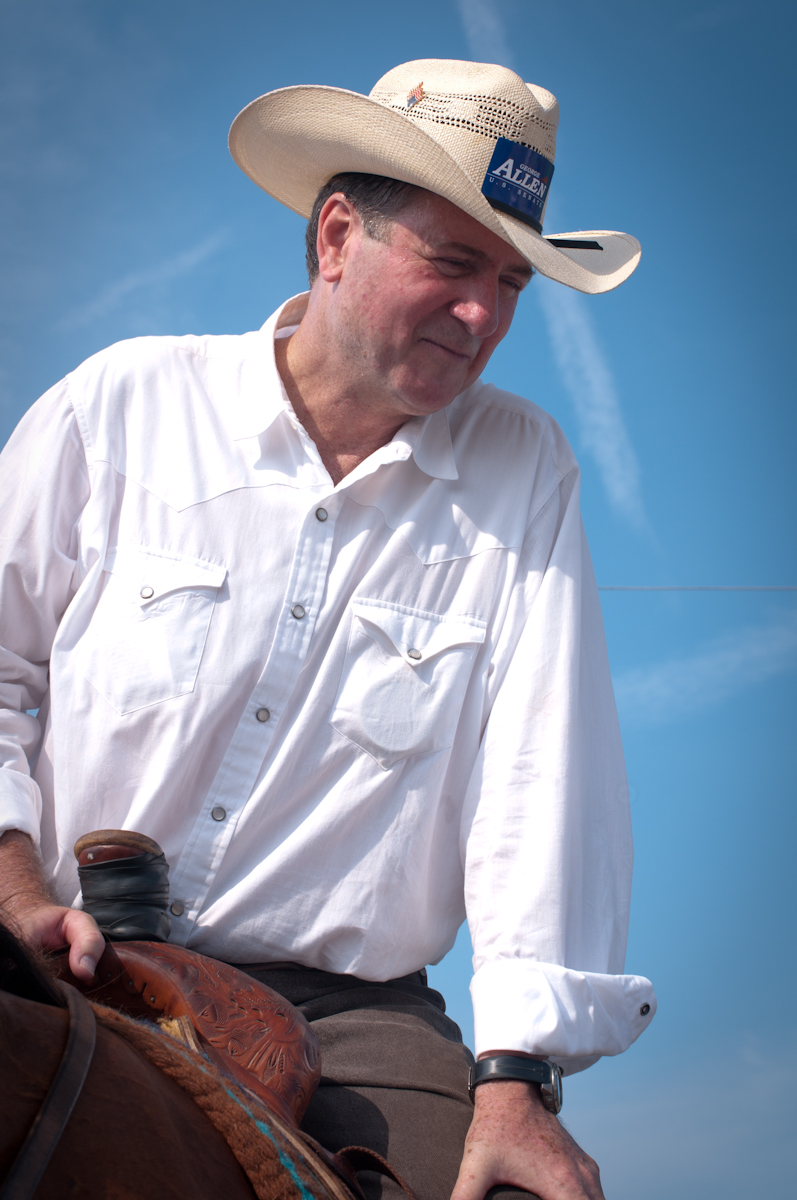
Allen campaigning at the July 4, 2011, parade in Crozet, Virginia

On January 24, 2011, Allen announced, through a video on his campaign website, that he was running for the Republican nomination for the U.S. Senate, to reclaim the seat he lost to Senator Jim Webb in 2006. In the June Republican primary, Allen secured the nomination with more than 65% of the vote, defeating Jamie Radtke (23%), Robert G. Marshall (7%) and E.W. Jackson (5%).

In February 2011, Webb announced he would not seek reelection. Allen faced former Virginia governor Tim Kaine in the November 2012 general election for the seat, and lost 53% to 47%.

== Electoral history ==
U.S. Senate election, 2012
Party	Candidate	Votes	%
Democratic	Tim Kaine	2,010,067	52.87
Republican	George Allen	1,785,542	46.96
Write-in		6,587	0.17

U.S. Senate Republican primary, 2012
Party	Candidate	Votes	%
Republican	George Allen	167,452	65.45
Republican	Jamie Radtke	58,980	23.05
Republican	Bob Marshall	17,308	6.76
Republican	E.W. Jackson	12,086	4.72

U.S. Senate election, 2006
Party	Candidate	Votes	%
Democratic	Jim Webb	1,175,606	49.59
Republican	George Allen (incumbent)	1,166,277	49.2
Independent Greens	Gail Parker	26,102	1.1
Write-in		2,460	0.1
Total votes		2,370,445	100

U.S. Senate election, 2000
Party	Candidate	Votes	%
Republican	George Allen	1,420,460	52.26
Democratic	Chuck Robb (incumbent)	1,296,093	47.68
Write-in		1,748	0.06
Total votes		2,718,301	100

Virginia gubernatorial election, 1993
Party	Candidate	Votes	%
Republican	George Allen	1,045,319	58.27
Democratic	Mary Sue Terry	733,527	40.89
Independent	Nancy B. Spannaus	14,398	0.8
Write-in		672	0.04
Total votes		1,793,916	100

Virginia's 7th congressional district special election, 1991
Party	Candidate	Votes	%
Republican	George Allen	106,745	63.93
Democratic	Kay Slaughter	59,655	35.73
Independent	John Torrice	566	0.34
Total votes		166,966	100

Virginia House of Delegates 58th District election, 1989
Party	Candidate	Votes	%
Republican	George Allen	14,560	99.02
Write-in		144	0.98
Total votes		14,704	100

Virginia House of Delegates 58th District election, 1987
Party	Candidate	Votes	%
Republican	George Allen	12,503	99.86
Write-in		18	0.14
Total votes		12,521	100

Virginia House of Delegates 58th District election, 1985
Party	Candidate	Votes	%
Republican	George Allen	9,698	99.81
Write-in		18	0.19
Total votes		9,716	100

Virginia House of Delegates 58th District election, 1983
Party	Candidate	Votes	%
Republican	George Allen	8,353	53.36
Democratic	James B. Murray	7,298	46.62
Write-in		2	0.02
Total votes		15,653	100

Virginia House of Delegates 58th District election, 1982
Party	Candidate	Votes	%
Republican	George Allen	6,897	50.08
Democratic	James B. Murray	6,872	49.90
Write-in		2	0.02
Total votes		13,771	100

Virginia House of Delegates 26th District election, 1979 (Two seats represented the 26th District)
Party	Candidate	Votes	%
Democratic	Thomas J. Michie Jr.	12,461	29.51
Democratic	James B. Murray	11,403	27.01
Republican	George Allen	9,527	22.56
Republican	Virginia Hahn	8,828	20.91
Total votes		42,219	100

== Personal life ==
Allen married Anne Patrice Rubel in June 1979. They divorced in 1983. In 1986, Allen married Susan Brown. The couple has three children. The Allens are residents of Virginia Beach, Virginia.

Allen is a member of the Presbyterian Church. He is fond of using football metaphors, a tendency that has been remarked upon by journalists and political commentators.

== See also ==
- List of governors of Virginia

U.S. House of Representatives
Preceded by French Slaughter	Member of the U.S. House of Representatives from Virginia's 7th congressional district 1991–1993	Succeeded by Thomas Bliley
Party political offices
Preceded by Marshall Coleman	Republican nominee for Governor of Virginia; 1993	Succeeded by Jim Gilmore
Preceded by Bill Frist	Chair of the National Republican Senatorial Committee; 2003–2005	Succeeded by Elizabeth Dole
Preceded by Oliver North	Republican nominee for U.S. Senator from Virginia (Class 1); 2000, 2006, 2012	Succeeded by Corey Stewart
Political offices
Preceded by Douglas Wilder	Governor of Virginia; 1994–1998	Succeeded by Jim Gilmore
U.S. Senate
Preceded by Chuck Robb	United States Senator (Class 1) from Virginia; 2001–2007; Served alongside: John Warner	Succeeded by Jim Webb
U.S. order of precedence (ceremonial)
Preceded by Paul Trible as Former U.S. Senator	Order of precedence of the United States	Succeeded by Jim Webb as Former U.S. Senator
