= Holladay House =

Historic building in Virginia, US

Coordinates: 38.244633°N 78.113550°W

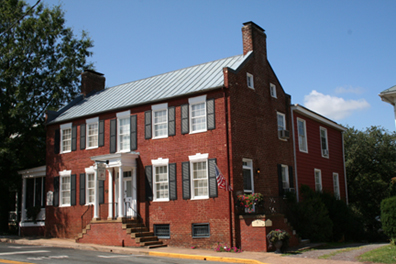

Formerly called the Doctor Holladay House, the Holladay House in Orange, Virginia (c.a. 1830) is on the nationally recognized Journey Through Hallowed Ground. Named for Dr. Lewis Holladay, a prominent Virginia physician, the Holladay House has witnessed almost two centuries of American history. The building is historically significant because it is one of only a few antebellum structures still standing in Orange, Virginia.

Since approximately 1830, the Holladay House has served as a mercantile store, a residence, a doctor’s office, and a Virginia bed and breakfast inn. In the early 20th century, a private schoolhouse for local children was also on the property. Only a handful of proprietors have owned the home, and the Holladay family was its steward for over 100 years. The Holladay House still boasts much of its original woodwork, including floors, mantels, doors and period antiques from the Holladay family.

The Holladay House is one of the two oldest standing structures in historic downtown Orange, and is a contributing property to the Orange Commercial Historic District, listed on the National Register of Historic Places. It has been a landmark on Main Street for generations.

== Architectural features ==
The Holladay House is a brick structure built in the classic Federal architectural style, with Greek Revival and Victorian-era upgrades to both the interior and the exterior. The brick is laid in Flemish bond, although the pattern is inconsistent in some places. The property contains two historical links to Montpelier, President James Madison's plantation home: the main entrance, and the English Oak tree in the backyard. This is not surprising because one of the early owners of the Holladay House was John Madison Chapman, a grand-nephew of President James Madison. The door at the main entrance on the front of the Holladay House is a duplicate of the front door of Montpelier. According to the staff at Montpelier, this doorway was designed by Thomas Jefferson. In addition, local legend holds that the large English Oak tree behind the Holladay House came from the Montpelier grounds.

== Antebellum history ==
In 1821, Samuel Dinkle purchased a lot from Paul Verdier in Orange, Virginia on behalf of the Lynchburg-based mercantile firm, Dinkle & Rumbough. By the early 1830s, Dinkle & Rumbough had built a brick structure on the property, which would later be expanded to become the Holladay House. Their store sold dry goods, groceries, hardware, and hats.

In 1837, John Madison Chapman (1810-1879), a local lawyer, acquired the property. Chapman lived in the house until his death. During his lengthy ownership, Chapman completed numerous Greek Revival and Victorian-era upgrades, including new moulding, chair rails, wooden mantels, door frames, and a black and gold Port D'Oro (also called Portor or Portoro) Italian marble mantel.

== The Holladay family ==
The McDonald family acquired the property in 1883, and lived there until 1899. Then Dr. Lewis Holladay (1868-1946) purchased the home. At that time, only the brick portion of the house existed, and the Holladays made several additions to the building while they lived there—the two most notable in 1910 and 1917, when the frame structure on the rear of the house was completed. The home remained in the Holladay family for 101 years, which is why the house bears their name.

Dr. Holladay served the citizens of Orange County, Virginia as their physician for nearly five decades. Prominently located at the crossroads in the Town of Orange, The Doctor Holladay House (as it was then called) was a familiar landmark in town. Educated at Hampden-Sydney College and the University of Virginia, Dr. Holladay was Dean of Physicians for Orange County throughout his medical career. In 1911, he was appointed a member of the State Board of Medical Examiners, where he served until his death. He was the Orange County Coroner, and the company surgeon for the Chesapeake and Ohio Railway. In addition to his medical career, Dr. Holladay served the town as Director of the National Bank of Orange, and as the ruling elder of Orange Presbyterian Church.

In the 1920s, the Holladays also constructed two new houses and a small schoolhouse on the property. The house on the west side still stands, but the house on the east side was torn down in the 1950s and a new house was built. The schoolhouse is no longer extant.
