= Orange, Virginia =

- Town
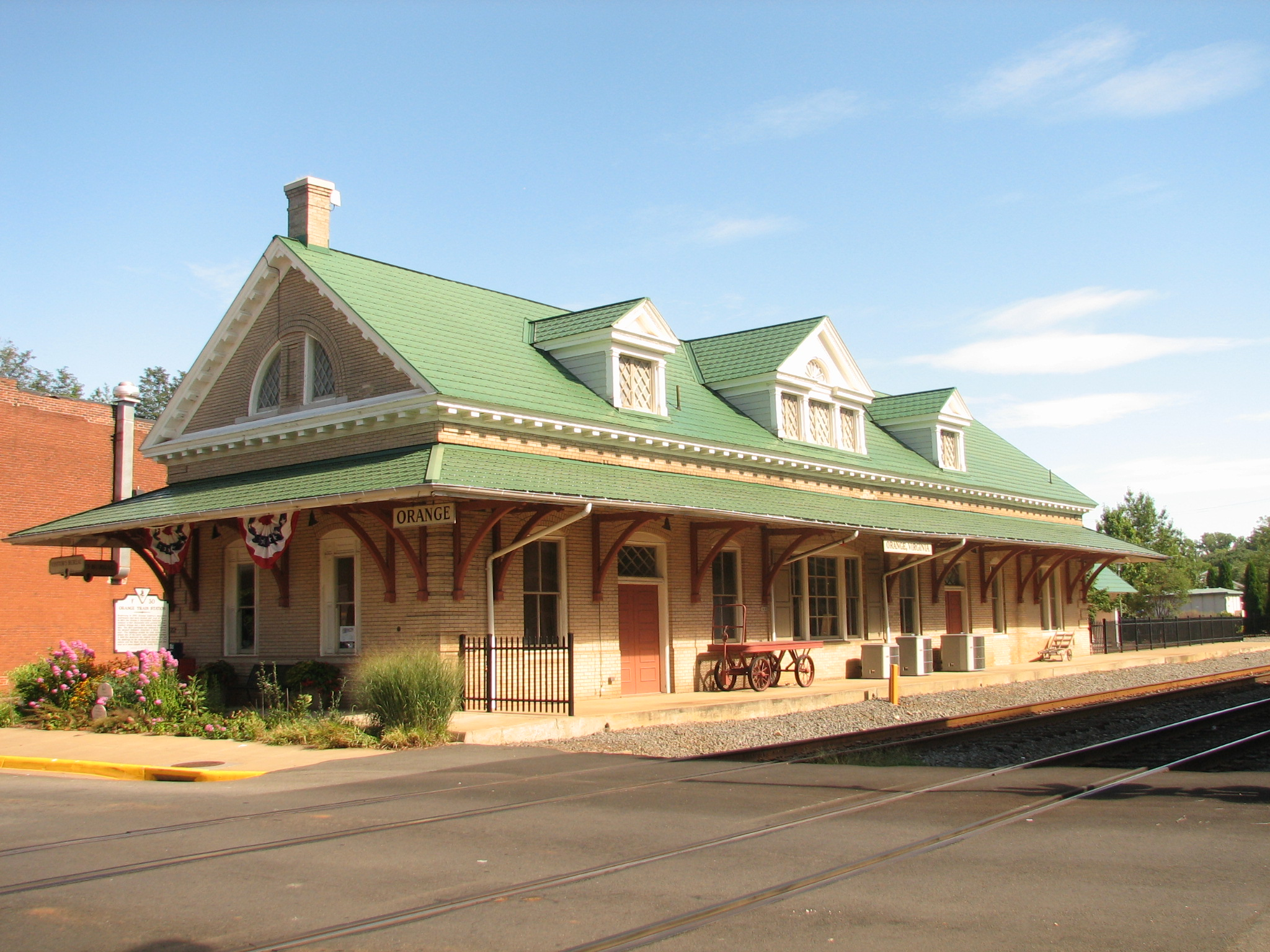
- Restored train depot in Orange, now used as a visitors' center

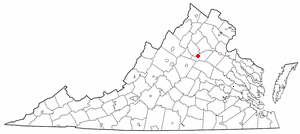
- Location of Orange, Virginia
- Coordinates: 38°14′45″N 78°6′35″W
- Country: United States
- State: Virginia
- County: Orange
- Incorporated: 1834; Officially in 1872

Area
  - Total: 3.38 sq mi (8.75 km^{2})
  - Land: 3.36 sq mi (8.71 km^{2})
  - Water: 0.015 sq mi (0.04 km^{2})
- Elevation: 522 ft (159 m)

Population (2020)
  - Total: 4,880
  - Density: 1,516.1/sq mi (585.36/km^{2})
- Time zone: UTC−5 (Eastern (EST))
  - Summer (DST): UTC−4 (EDT)
- ZIP code: 22960
- Area code: 540
- FIPS code: 51-59496
- GNIS feature ID: 1498525
- Website: Town of Orange official website

Orange is a town and the county seat of Orange County, Virginia, United States. The population was 4,880 at the 2020 census, representing a 3.4% increase since the 2010 census. Orange is 28 miles (45 km) northeast of Charlottesville, 88 miles (142 km) southwest of Washington, D.C., and 4 miles (6 km) east of Founding Father and fourth U.S. president James Madison's plantation of Montpelier.

== History ==
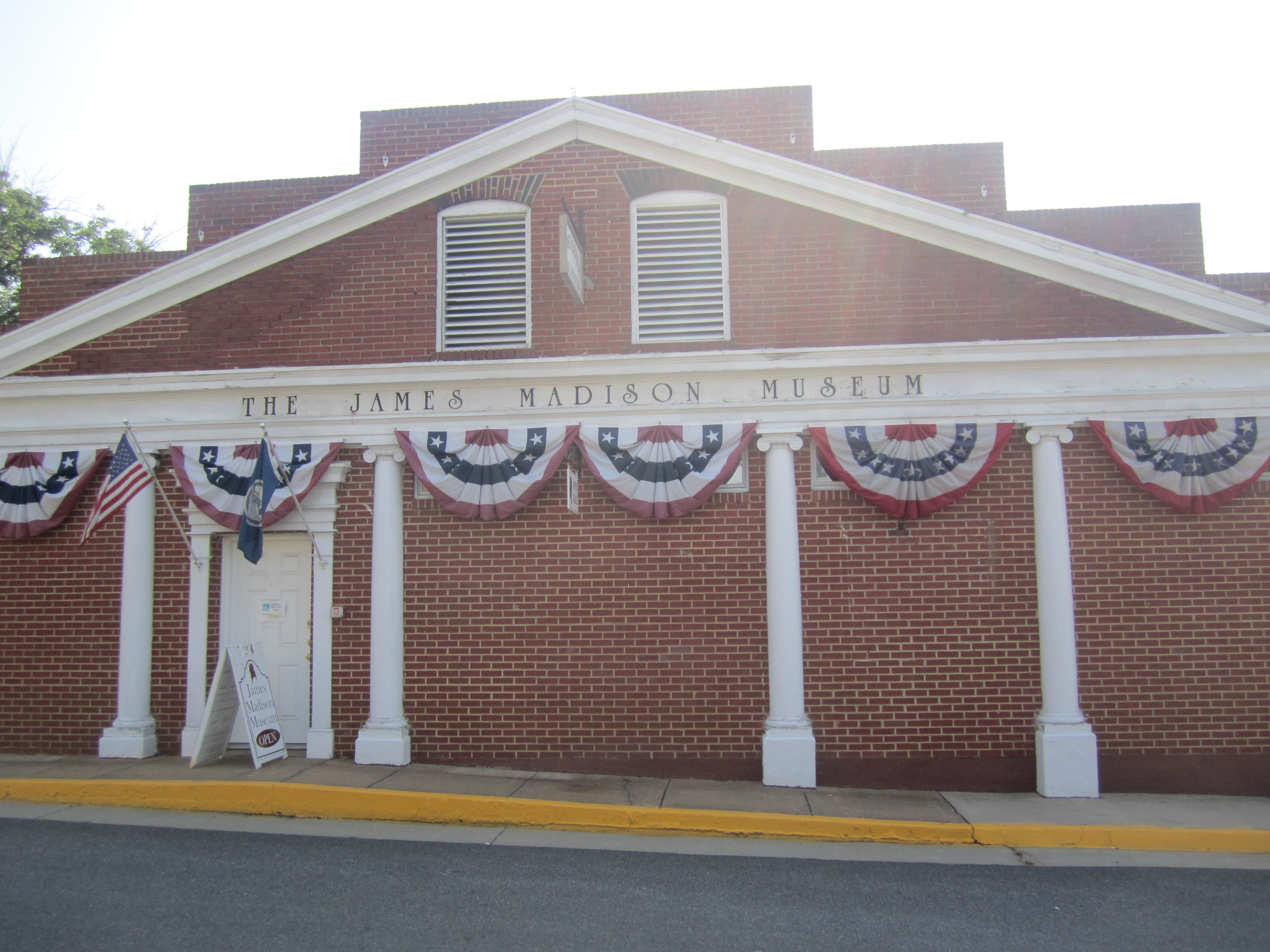
James Madison Museum

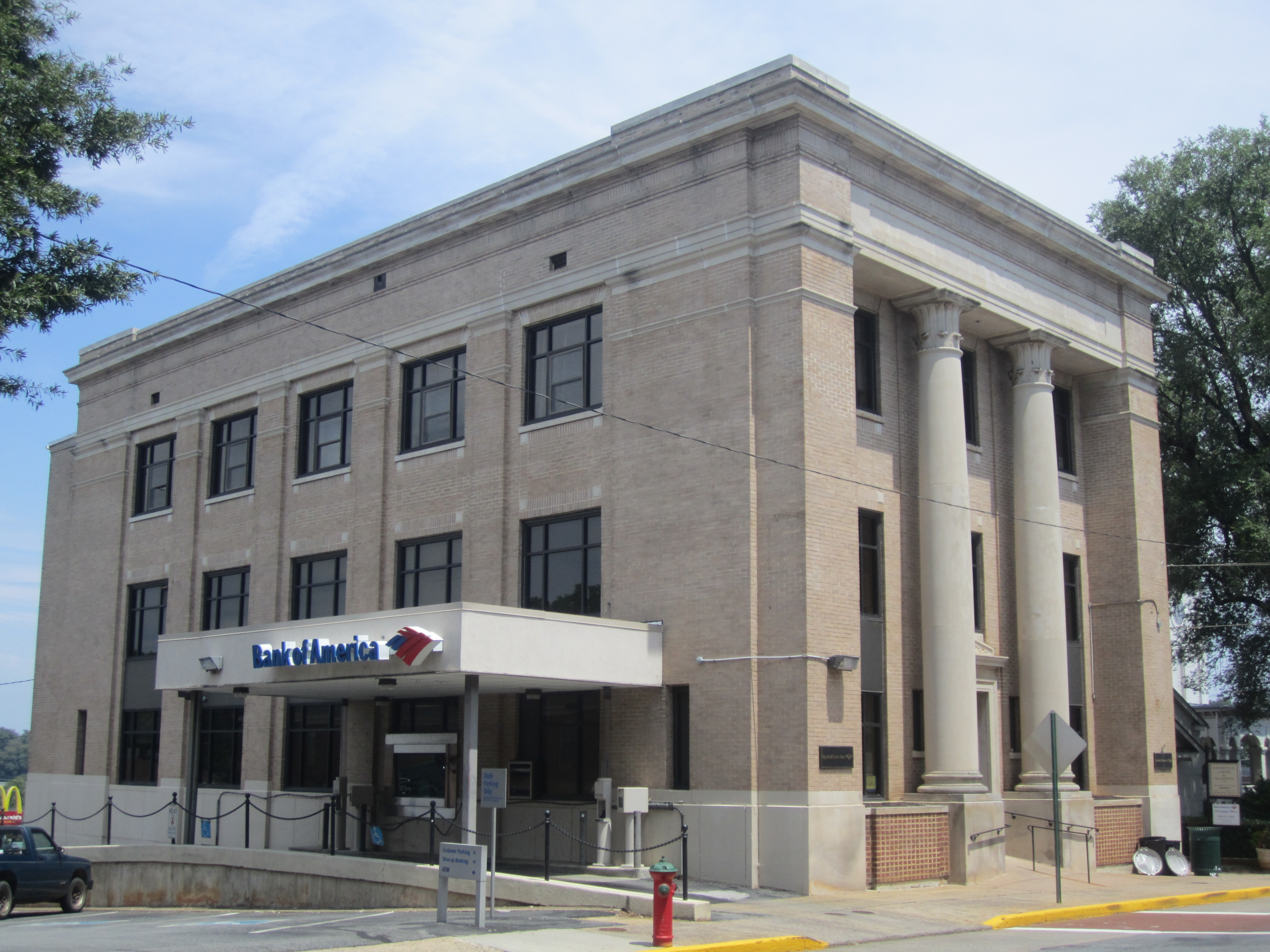
Bank of America in Orange

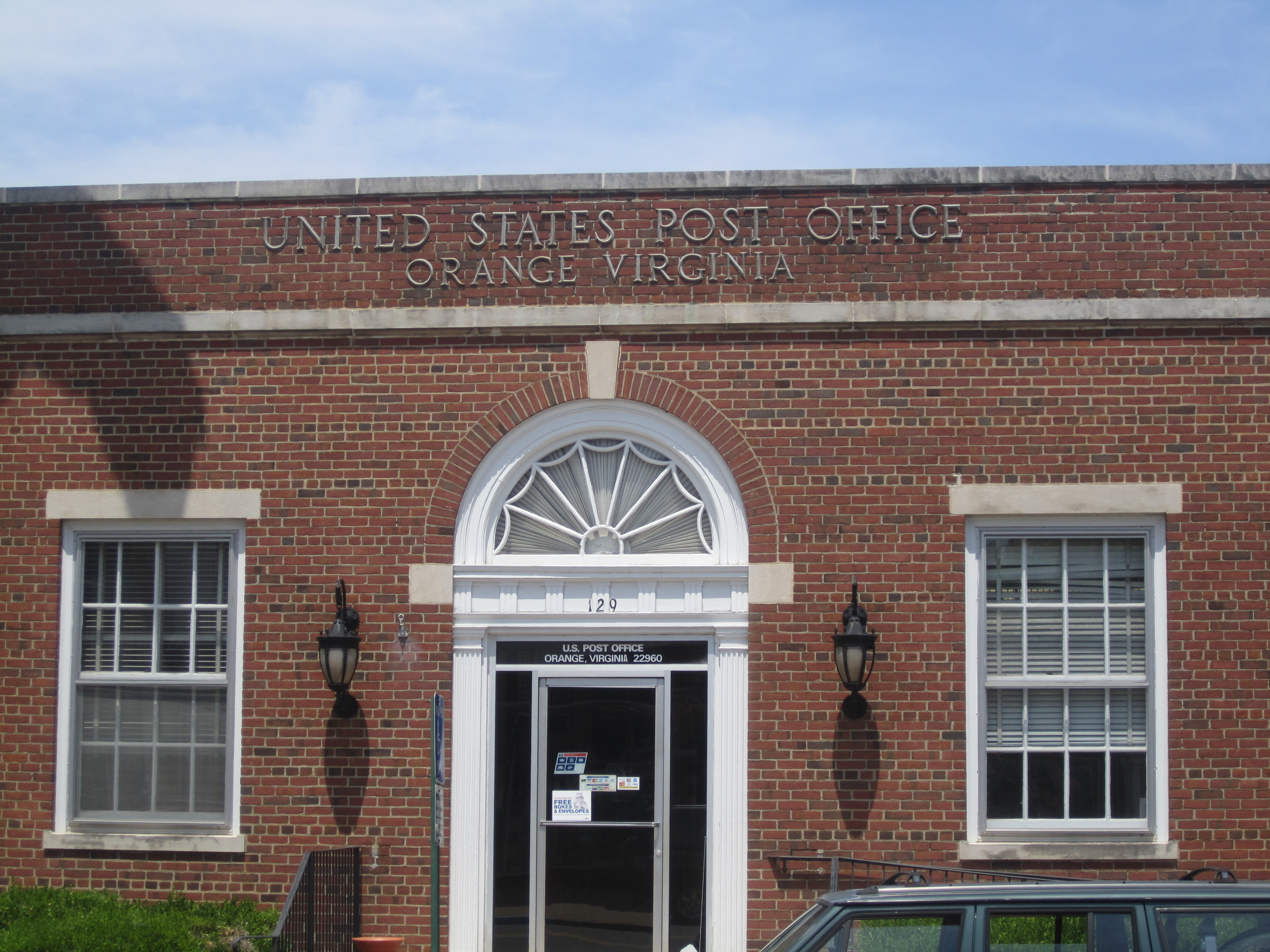
Post Office

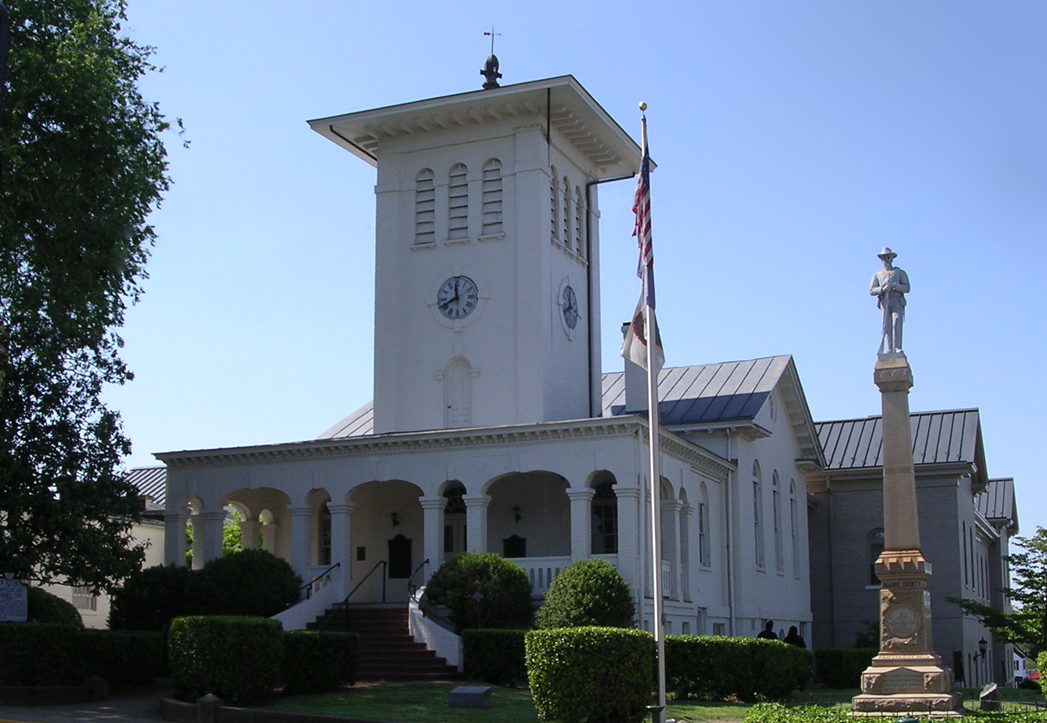
County Courthouse and Confederate monument

This area of the Piedmont was occupied by Siouan-speaking peoples at the time of European encounter. Tribes located in coastal areas generally spoke Algonquian languages.

=== Pre-Civil War ===
The present-day Town of Orange was known as the Town of Orange Court House prior to the late 19th century. Following the establishment of Culpeper County from a part of Orange County in 1749, the courthouse was relocated to Orange Court House from elsewhere in the county. The court convened in the house of a man named Timothy Crosthwait until 1752; after Crosthwait deeded the two acres to the county, a new courthouse was constructed on the property. The town at that time consisted of the courthouse and its related public buildings, a few houses and stores, a tavern and little else. The first U.S. Post Office was constructed in the town in 1796. From 1801 to 1804, the courthouse was replaced with a new building, clerk's office and, later, a new jail.

In 1799, Paul Verdier purchased the property of William Bell, an 18th-century farm that included much of the modern-day Town of Orange adjacent to Main Street, near present-day Bellevue and Peliso avenues. Verdier divided the land into lots, which helped shape the town's pattern of development. His house, which he named Montpeliso, still stands on the land. Growth continued into the 19th century as new roadways were constructed through the town. Along with expanding agricultural markets, the roads helped transform Orange Court House into a regional center. In 1834, the Virginia General Assembly passed an act allowing the incorporation of the Town of Orange Court House, but the act did not have implementing legislation.

Orange Court House continued growing, with several significant downtown buildings being constructed from this point up to the Civil War, including the Sparks Building (1829) the Holladay House (1830), and the St. Thomas Episcopal Church (1833). These buildings still stand as part of the Orange Commercial Historic District. In 1847, the Orange and Alexandria Railroad chose to route their new railway from Alexandria to Gordonsville through Orange. The county court granted the railroad right-of-way through the courthouse property, which required the courthouse to be moved to another location.

The fourth and current courthouse was completed in 1859 in the Italian Villa architectural style and stands today on the corner of Madison Road and Main Street. It was added to the National Register of Historic Places in 1979. The General Assembly passed an act in 1855 which officially incorporated the Town of Orange Court House, but it did not take effect until a majority of citizens qualified to vote consented, which did not occur until after the Civil War.

Orange was a strategically important location during the American Civil War. Just north of town, the Rapidan River was effectively the northern border of the Confederacy from March 1862 to May 1864. Consequently, the area witnessed countless troop movements, patrols, skirmishes, and encampments. In addition, the Town of Orange served as General Robert E. Lee's headquarters during that time. General Lee worshipped at the St. Thomas Episcopal Church. This church is also significant as it served as a hospital for Confederate wounded after the Battle of Chancellorsville and the Battle of the Wilderness. Lee passed by this church many times during his stay in Orange. Mort Künstler, an artist of American historical subjects, immortalized this scene in his painting Soldier of Faith. County records dating back to its founding in 1734 were protected by a clerk of court removing them to "a place of safety" as Federal troops were moving through Orange and towards Richmond.

=== Post-Civil War ===
Numerous buildings constructed soon after the Civil War stand in the downtown historic district. Following Virginia's readmission to the Union in 1870, Orange Court House officially became a town in 1872 when the petition (required by the 1855 General Assembly act) for an election of town trustees was filed in the court. The first town council meeting was held on June 28, 1872. In 1890, the village changed its name officially to the current-day Town of Orange.

The economy and population continued to grow up until the time of a fire in 1909, which destroyed most of the eastern portion of town. Like nearby Gordonsville, Orange's importance as a railroad hub began declining in the early 20th century. Because of its location at the confluence of two major roadways and the establishment of the Orange Automobile Club in 1910, the town became a regional center for automobile sales and services. Its accessibility allowed it to maintain a relatively healthy economy through the Great Depression.

A notable company in Orange during that period was American Silk Mills, Inc., which was established in 1929 and processed raw silk into a finished material. During World War II, the mill was awarded a presidential citation for its production of parachutes for Allied troops. Although much of the mid-20th-century industry moved to other locations, the population of Orange has grown steadily up through the 2010 census.

As of September 2013, Orange County contained 33 places listed on the National Register of Historic Places, seven of which are within the Town of Orange.

== Geography ==
Orange is located at 38°14′45″N 78°6′35″W (38.245894, −78.109786).

According to the United States Census Bureau, the town has a total area of 3.32 square miles (8.60 km^{2}), of which 3.31 square miles (8.56 km^{2}) is land and 0.02 square miles (0.04 km^{2}), or 0.49%, is water.

=== Climate ===
Climate data for Orange, Virginia (Piedmont Research Station) 1991–2020 normals, extremes 1946–present
Month	Jan	Feb	Mar	Apr	May	Jun	Jul	Aug	Sep	Oct	Nov	Dec	Year
Record high °F (°C)	81 (27)	81 (27)	88 (31)	94 (34)	95 (35)	102 (39)	106 (41)	103 (39)	106 (41)	98 (37)	86 (30)	79 (26)	106 (41)
Mean daily maximum °F (°C)	44.4 (6.9)	47.8 (8.8)	55.6 (13.1)	66.8 (19.3)	74.3 (23.5)	82.6 (28.1)	86.5 (30.3)	84.8 (29.3)	78.6 (25.9)	68.2 (20.1)	57.3 (14.1)	47.9 (8.8)	66.2 (19.0)
Daily mean °F (°C)	34.9 (1.6)	37.7 (3.2)	44.9 (7.2)	55.5 (13.1)	64.1 (17.8)	72.5 (22.5)	76.7 (24.8)	75.1 (23.9)	68.7 (20.4)	57.3 (14.1)	46.9 (8.3)	38.6 (3.7)	56.1 (13.4)
Mean daily minimum °F (°C)	25.3 (−3.7)	27.6 (−2.4)	34.3 (1.3)	44.2 (6.8)	53.8 (12.1)	62.5 (16.9)	66.9 (19.4)	65.4 (18.6)	58.7 (14.8)	46.3 (7.9)	36.5 (2.5)	29.2 (−1.6)	45.9 (7.7)
Record low °F (°C)	−9 (−23)	−11 (−24)	4 (−16)	18 (−8)	28 (−2)	41 (5)	47 (8)	44 (7)	33 (1)	22 (−6)	9 (−13)	−4 (−20)	−11 (−24)
Average precipitation inches (mm)	2.90 (74)	2.61 (66)	3.56 (90)	3.38 (86)	4.14 (105)	4.79 (122)	4.29 (109)	3.38 (86)	4.27 (108)	3.62 (92)	3.39 (86)	3.41 (87)	43.74 (1,111)
Average snowfall inches (cm)	4.6 (12)	5.6 (14)	2.7 (6.9)	0.1 (0.25)	0.0 (0.0)	0.0 (0.0)	0.0 (0.0)	0.0 (0.0)	0.0 (0.0)	0.0 (0.0)	0.2 (0.51)	3.2 (8.1)	16.4 (42)
Average precipitation days (≥ 0.01 in)	8.9	7.8	9.5	10.5	11.9	10.6	11.2	8.9	8.4	7.3	7.9	8.3	111.2
Average snowy days (≥ 0.1 in)	2.8	2.7	1.5	0.0	0.0	0.0	0.0	0.0	0.0	0.0	0.2	1.8	9.0
Source: NOAA

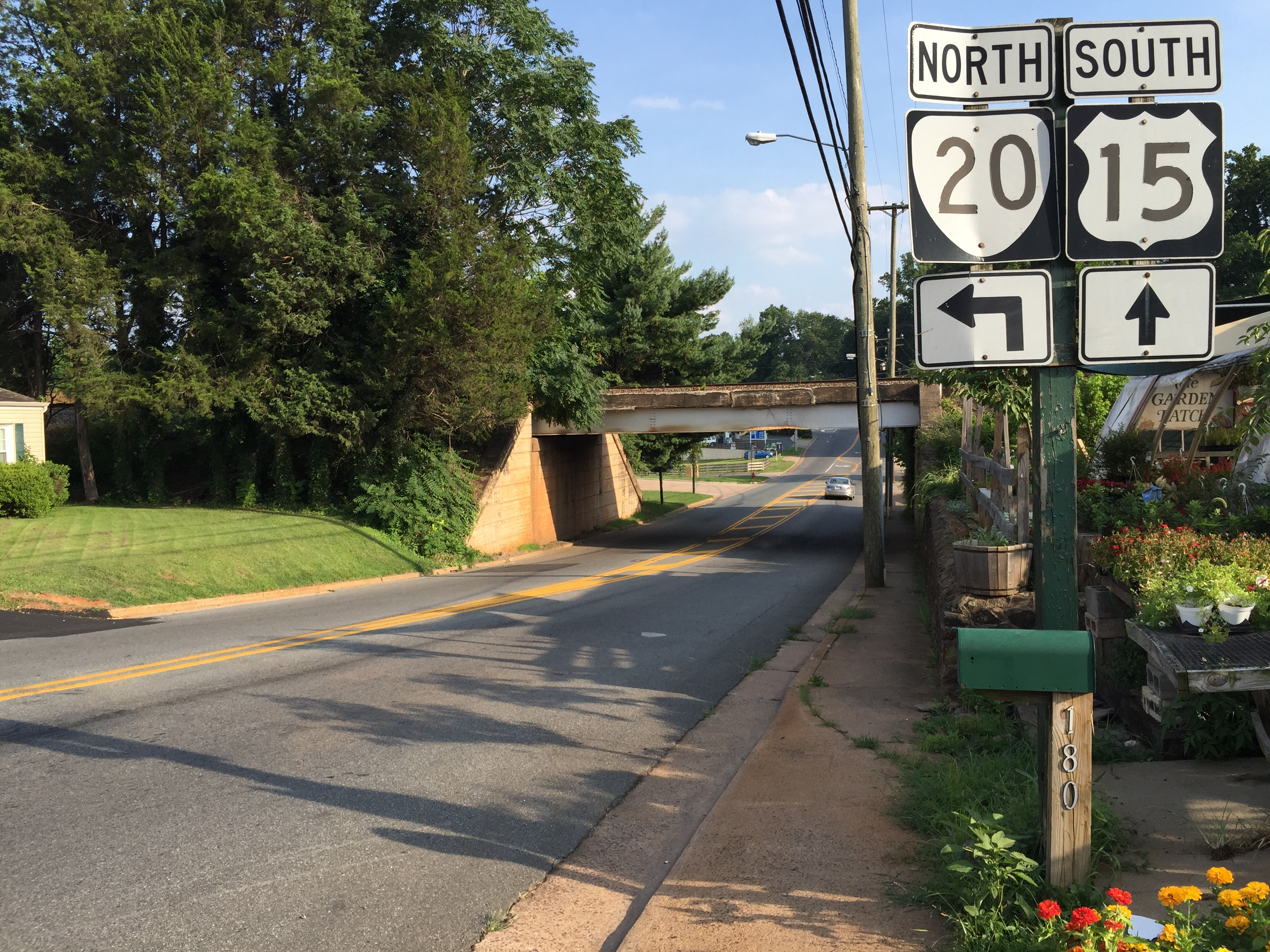
US 15 and SR 20 in Orange

== Transportation ==
The primary roadways serving Orange are U.S. Route 15 and Virginia State Route 20. U.S. 15 extends north and south, connecting Orange to Culpeper to the north and Gordonsville to the south. SR 20 extends more east and west (though is also signed north–south), connecting to Charlottesville to the west and heading towards Fredericksburg in the east. Virginia Regional Transit operates the Town of Orange Transit (TOOT), as well as a connecting service to Culpeper.

== Demographics ==
Historical population
Census	Pop.	Note	%±
1870	731		—
1880	547		−25.2%
1890	571		4.4%
1900	536		−6.1%
1910	674		25.7%
1920	1,078		59.9%
1930	1,381		28.1%
1940	1,980		43.4%
1950	2,571		29.8%
1960	2,955		14.9%
1970	2,768		−6.3%
1980	2,631		−4.9%
1990	2,582		−1.9%
2000	4,123		59.7%
2010	4,721		14.5%
2020	4,880		3.4%
U.S. Decennial Census

=== 2020 census ===
As of the 2020 census, Orange had a population of 4,880. The median age was 39.4 years. 23.8% of residents were under the age of 18 and 19.7% of residents were 65 years of age or older. For every 100 females, there were 83.1 males, and for every 100 females age 18 and over there were 78.6 males age 18 and over.

97.6% of residents lived in urban areas, while 2.4% lived in rural areas.

There were 1,943 households in Orange, of which 31.1% had children under the age of 18 living in them. Of all households, 33.5% were married-couple households, 17.7% were households with a male householder and no spouse or partner present, and 41.8% were households with a female householder and no spouse or partner present. About 35.8% of all households were made up of individuals and 16.5% had someone living alone who was 65 years of age or older.

There were 2,172 housing units, of which 10.5% were vacant. The homeowner vacancy rate was 3.7% and the rental vacancy rate was 9.6%.

Racial composition as of the 2020 census
Race	Number	Percent
White	3,116	63.9%
Black or African American	1,088	22.3%
American Indian and Alaska Native	23	0.5%
Asian	35	0.7%
Native Hawaiian and Other Pacific Islander	4	0.1%
Some other race	196	4.0%
Two or more races	418	8.6%
Hispanic or Latino (of any race)	353	7.2%

=== 2010 census ===
As of the census of 2010, there were 4,721 people, 1,779 households, and 1,058 families residing in the town. The population density was 1,423 people per square mile (549/km^{2}). There were 1,991 housing units at an average density of 600 per square mile (231.5/km^{2}). The racial makeup of the town was 72.1% White, 22.9% African American, 0.4% Native American, 0.3% Asian, 1.5% from other races, and 2.7% from two or more races. Hispanic or Latino of any race were 3.5% of the population.

Out of the 1,779 households, 27.5% had children under the age of 18 living with them, 36.0% were married couples living together, 18.2% had a female householder with no husband present, 5.3% had a male householder with no wife present, and 40.15 were non-families. Householders living alone accounted for 34.2% of the total households and 30.4% had a resident who was 65 years of age or older. The average household size was 2.32 and the average family size was 2.93.

The age distribution of Orange's population was 21.1% under the age of 18, 8.0% from 18 to 24, 27.4% from 25 to 44, 25.1% from 45 to 64, and 18.4% who were 65 years of age or older. The median age was 40.3 years. For every 100 females, there were 97 males. For every 100 females aged 18 and over, there were 96 males.

=== Income and poverty ===
The median income for a household in the town was $37,191, and the median income for a family was $49,524. Males working full-time had a median income of $38,247 versus $30,012 for females. The per capita income for the town was $19,151. Approximately 12.7% of families and 21.2% of the population were below the poverty line, including 29.4% of those under age 18 and 24.6% of those age 65 or over.

=== Employment ===
Of the population of 3,761 persons aged 16 and older, 57.2% were in the labor force; all worked in civilian occupations.

== Government ==
The Town of Orange has a council-manager form of government, with five elected at-large council members. They collectively appoint a town manager to administer the town's daily operations. The town manager hires staff to run the Community Development, Finance, Police, Public Works, Town Attorney and Town Clerk offices.

Orange operated on a budget of $8,034,744 for the 2013/2014 fiscal year, with revenue being composed of approximately 72% water/sewer utility payments, 8% real estate and personal property taxes, 8% (on top of state sales tax) taxes on prepared foods (a "meals" tax), and the remaining 7% from various other sources.

== Orange County School System ==
- Orange County High School
- Prospect Heights Middle School
- Locust Grove Middle School
- Locust Grove Elementary School
- Orange Elementary School
- Unionville Elementary School
- Gordon-Barbour Elementary School
- Lightfoot Elementary School (grades 3–5)
- Locust Grove Primary School
- Taylor Educational Administration Complex (school administrative offices)

== Notable people ==
- Norman C. Bailey (1890–1969), mayor of Orange, state delegate
- Cathy Baker, co-star of Hee Haw
- Nannie Helen Burroughs, black American educator, orator, religious leader and businesswoman
- Chris Haney, Major League Baseball (MLB) pitcher
- Larry Haney, MLB catcher and coach
- Patrick Kilpatrick, actor
- Randolph Scott, western film actor
- James Taliaferro, U.S. senator for Florida
- Jeanette Walls, journalist and author of The Glass Castle, Half Broke Horses, and The Silver Star

== Media ==
The Orange County Review is a weekly newspaper based in Orange and owned by Berkshire Hathaway Inc. The newspaper focuses on local community news. Public notices from Orange County commissioners also appear in the newspaper.
