= 1993 Virginia gubernatorial election =

- November 2, 1993
- Turnout: 61.1% (voting eligible)
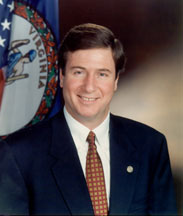

Nominee	George Allen	Mary Sue Terry
Party	Republican	Democratic
Popular vote	1,045,319	733,527
Percentage	58.27%	40.89%
- Allen: 50–60% 60–70% 70–80% 80–90% Terry: 50–60% 60–70%
Governor before election
L. Douglas Wilder
Democratic
Elected Governor
George Allen
Republican

The 1993 Virginia gubernatorial election was held on November 2, 1993. Barred from seeking a second term due to term limits restricting consecutive terms for Virginia governor, incumbent Democratic governor L. Douglas Wilder was replaced by Republican nominee and former U.S. representative George Allen. Allen, who had defeated Clinton Miller for the Republican nomination, defeated former attorney general of Virginia Mary Sue Terry, the Democratic nominee, by 58.27% to 40.89%, which ended 12 consecutive years of Democratic control of the governor's mansion.

Prior to 2025, this was the only time a woman had been a major party nominee in Virginia's gubernatorial election, and it is the last occasion the independent cities of Franklin, Fredericksburg, Hampton and Lexington voted Republican for Governor.

== Republican nomination ==
=== Candidates ===
- George Allen, former U.S. representative from Chesterfield County
- Clinton Miller, State Delegate from Shenandoah County

== General election ==
=== Candidates ===
- George Allen, former U.S. representative from Chesterfield County (Republican)
- Nancy B. Spannaus, LaRouchist activist (independent)
- Mary Sue Terry, Attorney General of Virginia (Democratic)

=== Results ===
1993 Virginia gubernatorial election
Party	Candidate	Votes	%	±%
Republican	George Allen	1,045,319	58.27%	+8.51%
Democratic	Mary Sue Terry	733,527	40.89%	−9.24%
Independent	Nancy B. Spannaus	14,398	0.80%	
Write-ins		672	0.04%	
Majority		311,792	17.38%	+17.00%
Turnout		1,793,916		
Republican gain from Democratic		Swing		

=== Results by county and city ===
County	Allen	Votes	Terry	Votes	Spannaus	Votes	Others	Votes
Accomack	62.2%	5,710	36.7%	3,371	1.2%	106	0.0%	0
Albemarle	59.7%	14,882	39.7%	9,889	0.6%	141	0.1%	22
Alexandria	37.3%	11,359	62.1%	18,895	0.5%	140	0.1%	23
Alleghany	65.7%	2,885	33.1%	1,451	1.2%	52	0.0%	0
Amelia	62.3%	2,365	36.7%	1,393	1.1%	41	0.0%	0
Amherst	62.9%	5,375	36.5%	3,122	0.6%	48	0.0%	1
Appomattox	61.5%	2,624	37.8%	1,613	0.6%	27	0.0%	0
Arlington	36.2%	18,719	63.3%	32,736	0.4%	218	0.1%	34
Augusta	81.0%	14,029	18.1%	3,126	0.9%	156	0.0%	2
Bath	65.6%	1,132	33.0%	570	1.3%	22	0.1%	1
Bedford	55.9%	1,033	43.1%	797	0.9%	17	0.1%	1
Bedford County	68.1%	10,637	31.2%	4,874	0.7%	112	0.0%	1
Bland	78.9%	1,607	20.1%	410	0.9%	19	0.0%	0
Botetourt	65.1%	6,375	34.1%	3,336	0.8%	83	0.0%	3
Bristol	70.7%	3,208	28.3%	1,283	1.0%	45	0.0%	0
Brunswick	47.7%	2,313	51.7%	2,504	0.6%	27	0.0%	1
Buchanan	57.9%	3,869	37.4%	2,503	4.7%	315	0.0%	0
Buckingham	59.6%	2,382	39.5%	1,577	0.9%	36	0.0%	0
Buena Vista	57.4%	1,000	42.1%	734	0.5%	8	0.0%	0
Campbell	67.9%	9,940	31.4%	4,599	0.7%	99	0.0%	2
Caroline	54.4%	3,019	44.7%	2,483	0.9%	49	0.0%	1
Carroll	67.4%	5,424	32.0%	2,577	0.6%	49	0.0%	1
Charles City	34.2%	759	64.5%	1,431	1.3%	29	0.0%	0
Charlotte	63.1%	2,570	36.2%	1,474	0.7%	29	0.0%	0
Charlottesville	45.3%	4,748	54.0%	5,660	0.5%	53	0.2%	22
Chesapeake	59.1%	24,733	40.0%	16,769	0.9%	362	0.0%	13
Chesterfield	70.8%	51,317	28.4%	20,602	0.7%	496	0.1%	39
Clarke	62.7%	2,046	36.9%	1,204	0.4%	14	0.0%	1
Clifton Forge	52.5%	755	46.6%	671	0.8%	12	0.1%	1
Colonial Heights	76.9%	5,007	22.4%	1,459	0.7%	46	0.0%	0
Covington	52.3%	1,227	47.0%	1,103	0.8%	18	0.0%	0
Craig	66.1%	1,268	32.9%	631	0.9%	18	0.0%	0
Culpeper	73.1%	5,750	26.2%	2,063	0.6%	50	0.0%	1
Cumberland	63.6%	1,677	35.4%	932	1.0%	26	0.0%	0
Danville	60.4%	8,844	38.9%	5,694	0.7%	103	0.0%	2
Dickenson	59.2%	2,935	37.5%	1,861	3.2%	161	0.0%	2
Dinwiddie	58.8%	3,798	40.0%	2,587	1.2%	78	0.0%	0
Emporia	58.9%	1,079	40.1%	734	1.0%	18	0.0%	0
Essex	59.3%	1,716	40.0%	1,158	0.7%	21	0.0%	1
Fairfax	53.5%	3,390	46.1%	2,920	0.4%	23	0.1%	5
Fairfax County	51.5%	124,270	48.0%	115,800	0.4%	882	0.1%	190
Falls Church	39.3%	1,613	60.3%	2,472	0.3%	13	0.0%	2
Fauquier	68.3%	9,923	31.3%	4,545	0.4%	62	0.0%	1
Floyd	62.8%	2,710	36.7%	1,584	0.5%	23	0.0%	1
Fluvanna	67.7%	3,289	31.5%	1,533	0.8%	38	0.0%	0
Franklin	52.0%	1,418	46.7%	1,273	1.3%	35	0.0%	0
Franklin County	58.4%	7,555	40.7%	5,267	0.8%	102	0.0%	4
Frederick	74.8%	9,510	24.7%	3,139	0.5%	66	0.0%	0
Fredericksburg	50.7%	2,488	48.2%	2,367	0.9%	45	0.1%	7
Galax	60.1%	1,021	39.3%	667	0.6%	10	0.0%	0
Giles	64.3%	3,579	34.7%	1,928	1.0%	56	0.0%	1
Gloucester	65.5%	6,480	33.3%	3,299	1.2%	115	0.0%	3
Goochland	65.7%	4,063	33.7%	2,088	0.6%	35	0.0%	1
Grayson	65.3%	3,323	34.0%	1,733	0.7%	35	0.0%	0
Greene	76.3%	2,592	22.9%	779	0.8%	28	0.0%	0
Greensville	47.0%	1,297	51.8%	1,429	1.3%	35	0.0%	0
Halifax	61.6%	5,024	37.4%	3,052	1.0%	84	0.0%	1
Hampton	50.4%	17,780	48.4%	17,055	1.2%	413	0.0%	6
Hanover	74.2%	19,817	25.2%	6,728	0.6%	153	0.0%	7
Harrisonburg	68.3%	4,715	31.0%	2,141	0.6%	42	0.1%	5
Henrico	64.4%	51,550	34.8%	27,808	0.8%	601	0.1%	45
Henry	50.5%	9,048	48.5%	8,702	1.0%	176	0.0%	1
Highland	69.0%	795	29.9%	345	1.0%	11	0.1%	1
Hopewell	64.5%	4,104	34.3%	2,181	1.2%	77	0.0%	3
Isle of Wight	59.1%	5,158	40.1%	3,499	0.8%	70	0.0%	0
James City	58.7%	8,032	40.6%	5,560	0.7%	91	0.0%	3
King and Queen	52.9%	1,151	46.3%	1,007	0.9%	19	0.0%	0
King George	65.6%	2,573	33.8%	1,328	0.6%	24	0.0%	0
King William	64.5%	2,512	34.8%	1,355	0.7%	26	0.0%	0
Lancaster	65.8%	2,877	33.1%	1,446	1.1%	47	0.0%	2
Lee	59.5%	4,471	39.1%	2,935	1.4%	104	0.0%	0
Lexington	50.1%	853	49.1%	835	0.8%	13	0.0%	0
Loudoun	58.6%	16,088	40.3%	11,057	1.1%	298	0.0%	9
Louisa	62.7%	4,290	36.3%	2,484	0.9%	63	0.0%	3
Lunenburg	59.3%	2,330	39.5%	1,553	1.1%	45	0.0%	0
Lynchburg	57.9%	11,067	41.6%	7,938	0.5%	99	0.0%	0
Madison	71.0%	2,763	28.2%	1,098	0.8%	30	0.0%	0
Manassas	64.2%	4,250	35.3%	2,341	0.5%	31	0.0%	2
Manassas Park	65.3%	584	33.4%	299	1.2%	11	0.0%	0
Martinsville	41.5%	2,244	57.8%	3,124	0.7%	38	0.0%	1
Mathews	65.7%	2,392	33.0%	1,201	1.3%	49	0.0%	0
Mecklenburg	65.9%	5,695	33.0%	2,856	1.1%	93	0.0%	0
Middlesex	62.1%	2,233	36.9%	1,326	0.9%	34	0.0%	0
Montgomery	56.2%	11,110	43.0%	8,505	0.8%	164	0.0%	6
Nelson	59.1%	2,715	40.2%	1,846	0.7%	34	0.0%	0
New Kent	66.3%	2,903	32.6%	1,428	1.0%	42	0.1%	4
Newport News	53.9%	22,242	45.1%	18,596	1.0%	417	0.0%	5
Norfolk	42.4%	20,499	56.3%	27,242	1.3%	618	0.1%	29
Northampton	50.6%	2,032	48.4%	1,943	0.9%	38	0.0%	1
Northumberland	64.3%	2,731	34.7%	1,475	1.0%	43	0.0%	0
Norton	57.0%	554	41.8%	406	1.2%	12	0.0%	0
Nottoway	60.9%	2,851	38.4%	1,799	0.7%	31	0.0%	0
Orange	66.8%	4,409	32.3%	2,133	0.9%	59	0.0%	2
Page	75.5%	4,690	23.9%	1,485	0.5%	32	0.0%	1
Patrick	53.4%	3,120	45.9%	2,681	0.8%	44	0.0%	0
Petersburg	34.0%	2,939	64.6%	5,585	1.4%	119	0.0%	0
Pittsylvania	66.5%	11,172	32.4%	5,439	1.0%	176	0.0%	2
Poquoson	71.2%	2,931	28.1%	1,158	0.7%	28	0.0%	1
Portsmouth	43.8%	11,593	55.2%	14,626	1.0%	271	0.0%	5
Powhatan	71.9%	3,904	27.4%	1,485	0.7%	38	0.0%	0
Prince Edward	58.8%	2,984	40.1%	2,035	1.0%	53	0.0%	0
Prince George	67.7%	4,671	31.6%	2,179	0.8%	53	0.0%	1
Prince William	62.6%	28,606	36.8%	16,823	0.5%	233	0.0%	8
Pulaski	64.0%	6,804	35.2%	3,747	0.8%	82	0.0%	3
Radford	54.2%	1,942	45.0%	1,610	0.7%	25	0.1%	3
Rappahannock	63.9%	1,527	35.3%	842	0.7%	16	0.1%	3
Richmond	39.8%	21,935	59.1%	32,610	1.1%	602	0.0%	23
Richmond County	68.8%	1,615	30.5%	715	0.7%	16	0.0%	0
Roanoke	48.1%	12,378	51.0%	13,106	0.9%	230	0.0%	9
Roanoke County	61.2%	19,612	38.1%	12,216	0.6%	191	0.0%	9
Rockbridge	63.6%	3,825	35.4%	2,126	0.9%	54	0.1%	5
Rockingham	79.0%	13,555	20.3%	3,485	0.7%	118	0.0%	4
Russell	59.5%	4,190	37.5%	2,644	3.0%	209	0.0%	0
South Boston	61.3%	1,240	38.3%	776	0.4%	8	0.0%	0
Salem	59.4%	5,062	39.7%	3,384	0.9%	80	0.0%	2
Scott	69.9%	5,421	28.8%	2,234	1.3%	97	0.0%	0
Shenandoah	76.1%	8,046	23.3%	2,463	0.6%	59	0.0%	2
Smyth	71.6%	6,782	27.1%	2,566	1.4%	130	0.0%	0
Southampton	56.7%	2,999	42.5%	2,250	0.8%	44	0.0%	0
Spotsylvania	67.9%	11,543	31.6%	5,368	0.5%	91	0.0%	2
Stafford	67.9%	11,631	31.4%	5,382	0.7%	125	0.0%	3
Staunton	72.5%	5,263	26.6%	1,932	0.8%	57	0.0%	3
Suffolk	55.4%	8,551	43.6%	6,728	0.9%	144	0.0%	1
Surry	47.0%	1,138	52.1%	1,263	0.9%	22	0.0%	0
Sussex	47.5%	1,536	51.6%	1,671	0.9%	28	0.0%	1
Tazewell	70.1%	7,214	28.1%	2,894	1.7%	180	0.0%	2
Virginia Beach	59.9%	53,700	39.1%	35,088	0.9%	829	0.0%	38
Warren	69.5%	4,767	30.0%	2,059	0.5%	31	0.0%	0
Washington	70.2%	9,579	28.6%	3,904	1.2%	164	0.0%	3
Waynesboro	70.7%	3,777	28.2%	1,505	1.1%	57	0.1%	3
Westmoreland	59.0%	2,504	40.0%	1,698	0.9%	39	0.0%	0
Williamsburg	43.9%	1,168	55.2%	1,469	0.9%	23	0.1%	3
Winchester	66.9%	3,708	32.4%	1,798	0.6%	35	0.0%	0
Wise	61.5%	5,829	36.3%	3,438	2.3%	217	0.0%	0
Wythe	69.2%	5,606	29.7%	2,410	1.0%	85	0.0%	3
York	62.8%	9,183	36.4%	5,324	0.8%	116	0.0%	3

Counties and independent cities that flipped from Democratic to Republican

- Buchanan
- Caroline
- Buena Vista (independent city)
- Clifton Forge (independent city)
- Covington (independent city)
- Chesapeake (independent city)
- Dickenson
- Fairfax
- Fairfax (independent city)
- Fredericksburg (independent city)
- Franklin
- Giles
- King and Queen
- Loudoun
- Lee
- Montgomery
- Albemarle
- Nelson
- Prince Edward
- Hampton (independent city)
- Newsport News (independent city)
- Norton (independent city)
- Rockbridge
- Northampton
- Russell
- Southampton
- Suffolk (independent city)
- Wise

Counties and independent cities that flipped from Republican to Democratic

- Martinsville (independent city)
