= D. French Slaughter Jr. =

American politician

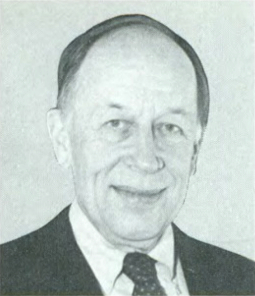

Member of the U.S. House of Representatives from Virginia's 7th district
- In office January 3, 1985 – November 5, 1991
- Preceded by: J. Kenneth Robinson
- Succeeded by: George Allen

Member of the Virginia House of Delegates
- In office January 8, 1958 – January 11, 1978
- Preceded by: Norman C. Bailey
- Succeeded by: George P. Beard Jr.
- Constituency: Madison, Culpeper, and Orange (1958–1962); 45th district (1962–1964); 44th district (1964–1972); 25th district (1972–1978)

Personal details
- Born: Daniel French Slaughter Jr. May 20, 1925 Culpeper, Virginia, U.S.
- Died: October 2, 1998 (aged 73) Charlottesville, Virginia, U.S.
- Party: Republican (1984–1998); Independent (1974–1984); Democratic (before 1974)
- Education: University of Virginia (BA, LLB)

Military service
- Allegiance: United States
- Branch/service: United States Army
- Years of service: 1943–1947
- Battles/wars: World War II

Daniel French Slaughter Jr. (May 20, 1925 – October 2, 1998) was an American politician and member of the United States House of Representatives from January 3, 1985, until his resignation on November 5, 1991.

== Early life and education ==
Daniel Slaughter Jr. was born in Culpeper, Virginia, and attended public schools in Culpeper County. He attended Virginia Military Institute and graduated in 1953 with a B.A. and LL.B. from the University of Virginia, where he was a member of the Raven Society and of St. Anthony Hall.

== Early career ==
Slaughter served in the United States Army in combat infantry from 1943 to 1947 and was awarded the Purple Heart. He was admitted to the bar and practiced law in Culpeper.

He served in the Virginia House of Delegates from 1958 to 1978, serving as a Democrat until 1974, when he became an independent. In the early 1960s, he supported "massive resistance" to court-ordered school integration. He was a member of the board of visitors of the University of Virginia from 1978 to 1982, where he also served as rector from 1980 to 1982. From 1981 to 1984 he served as aide to John Otho Marsh Jr., the Secretary of the Army.

== Congressional career ==
Slaughter was elected from the 7th congressional district of Virginia in 1984 as a Republican. He was reelected three more times. However, he resigned on November 5, 1991, due to a series of strokes. He died in Charlottesville, Virginia, on October 2, 1998.

=== Electoral history ===
- 1984; Slaughter was elected to the U.S. House of Representatives with 56.5% of the vote, defeating Democrat Lewis M. Costello and Independent R.E. Frazier.
- 1986; Slaughter was re-elected unopposed.
- 1988; Slaughter was re-elected unopposed.
- 1990; Slaughter was re-elected with 58.19% of the vote, defeating Democrat David M. Smith.

Virginia House of Delegates
Preceded by Norman C. Bailey	Member of the Virginia House of Delegates for Madison, Culpeper, and Orange; January 8, 1958–January 10, 1962	Succeeded by None (districts numbered)
Preceded by None (district created)	Member of the Virginia House of Delegates from the 45th district January 10, 1962–January 8, 1964	Succeeded by C. William Cleaton
Preceded by	Member of the Virginia House of Delegates from the 44th district January 8, 1964–January 12, 1972	Succeeded by Thomas R. Glass
Preceded by Calvin W. Fowler	Member of the Virginia House of Delegates from the 25th district January 12, 1972–January 11, 1978	Succeeded by George P. Beard Jr.
U.S. House of Representatives
Preceded by J. Kenneth Robinson	Member of the U.S. House of Representatives from Virginia's 7th congressional district January 3, 1985–November 5, 1991	Succeeded by George Allen
