= Paul Clinton Harris =

American politician (born 1964)

Member of the Virginia House of Delegates from the 58th district
- In office January 14, 1998 – January 9, 2002
- Preceded by: Peter T. Way
- Succeeded by: Rob Bell

Personal details
- Born: Paul Clinton Harris; March 31, 1964 (age 62) Charlottesville, Virginia, U.S.
- Party: Republican
- Education: Hampton University; George Washington University

Military service
- Allegiance: United States
- Branch/service: United States Army
- Years of service: 1986–1990
- Rank: First lieutenant
- Unit: Military Intelligence Corps

Paul Clinton Harris (born March 31, 1964) is a former Delegate of Albemarle County, Virginia, in the Virginia House of Delegates.

He graduated from Hampton University in 1986 with a B.A. in political science. Harris served as a 1st lieutenant in military intelligence from 1986 to 1990. He graduated from George Washington University in 1995 with a J.D.

== Political career ==
He became the first African American Republican elected to the House of Delegates since Reconstruction in the 1997 legislative elections. He won re-election in 1999. In 2001, he began working for the United States Department of Justice.

Virginia Republican party leaders floated Harris as a possible successor to Republican Party Chairman Jeff Frederick in March 2009.
