= Peter T. Way =

American clergyman and politician (1937–2018)

Member of the Virginia House of Delegates from the 58th district
- In office January 8, 1992 – January 14, 1998
- Preceded by: George Allen
- Succeeded by: Paul C. Harris

Personal details
- Born: Peter Trosdal Way; August 15, 1937 Jacksonville, Florida, U.S.
- Died: October 6, 2018 (aged 81) Charlottesville, Virginia, U.S.
- Party: Republican
- Spouse: Elizabeth Crockett (m. 1964)

Peter Trosdal Way (August 15, 1937 – October 6, 2018) was an American clergyman and politician who was a member of the Virginia House of Delegates from 1992 until 1997.
