= Virginia's 58th House of Delegates district =

Virginia legislative district

District map from the 2023 election

Virginia's 58th House of Delegates district elects one of 100 seats in the Virginia House of Delegates, the lower house of the state's bicameral legislature. District 58 represents part of western Henrico County. The seat is currently head by Rodney Willett. Prior to 2021, District 58 represented Greene County as well as parts of Albemarle, Fluvanna, and Rockingham counties. Prior to the 2021 redistricting, the seat was held by Republican Robert B. Bell, who resigned in September 2023.

== District officeholders ==
- George Allen (R): January 12, 1983 – November 5, 1991
- Peter T. Way (R): 1992 – 1997
- Paul C. Harris (R): January 14, 1998 – January 9, 2002
- Rob Bell (R): January 9, 2002 – September 18, 2023
- Rodney Willett (D): (2024–present)

== Population and geography ==
The district's boundaries changed on April 29, 2011 to adjust for population changes measured by the 2010 U.S. Census of Population, so that each district would have about 80,000 residents. The changes reduced the size of the part of the district east of Charlottesville and just around the city, and expanded it toward the northwest.
