= Norman C. Bailey =

American politician (1890–1969)

Member of the Virginia House of Delegates
- In office 1944–1957

Personal details
- Born: Norman Calvin Bailey; June 22, 1890 Madison County, Virginia, U.S.
- Died: July 23, 1969 (aged 79) Charlottesville, Virginia, U.S.
- Resting place: Graham Cemetery
- Party: Democratic
- Spouse: Martha Florence Garrett
- Children: 7
- Occupation: Politician; bank director; grocer

Norman Calvin Bailey (June 22, 1890 – July 23, 1969) was an American politician from Virginia. He served in the Virginia House of Delegates from 1944 to 1957.

== Early life ==
Norman Calvin Bailey was born on June 22, 1890, in Madison County, Virginia, to Mary Belle (née Battaille) and John S. Bailey. He attended a private school in Madison County.

== Career ==
Bailey was a Democrat. He represented Madison and Orange counties in the Virginia House of Delegates from 1944 to 1957. He was mayor of Orange for 22 years and also served on the town council.

Bailey was a member of the board of directors of the Orange County Chamber of Commerce. During World War II, Bailey was a home service chairman of the Orange County chapter of the American Red Cross. Bailey was a member of the board of directors of Virginia National Bank in Charlottesville and Orange County. He was a manager of Merchants – Peoples Company of Orange and a member of the board of directors of Merchants Grocery Company of Culpeper. He also worked as a wholesale grocer.

== Personal life ==
Bailey married Martha Florence Garrett. They had two sons and five daughters, Norman C. Jr., Roger C., Margaret, Dorothy, Martha, Jean and Mrs. Bruce Radney. He was chairman of the board of Trinity United Methodist Church.

Bailey died on July 23, 1969, at Charlottesville Hospital. He was buried in Graham Cemetery.
